= 1st Armored Brigade Combat Team, 34th Infantry Division =

Subdivision of Minnesota National Guard, U.S.

- 34th Infantry Division's shoulder sleeve insignia
- Active: 1861 – present
- Country: United States
- Branch: United States Army National Guard
- Type: Armor
- Size: Brigade
- Garrison/HQ: Rosemount, Minnesota
- Mottos: "Attack, Attack, Attack!"
- March: "March of the Red Bull Legions"
- Anniversaries: Organized: 29 April 1861
- Engagements: Civil War; Bull Run; Peninsula; Valley; Antietam; Fredericksburg; Gettysburg; Petersburg; Virginia; War with Spain; Manila; Philippine Insurrection; Luzon; San Isidro; First World War; Second World War; Tunisia; Naples-Foggia; Anxio; Rome-Arno; North Apennines; Po Valley; War on terror; Iraq War
- Decorations: French Croix de Guerre with Palm

Commanders
- Current commander: LTC Michael Klaphake
- Notable commanders: COL Jon A. Jensen, COL Richard C. Nash

Insignia
- Distinctive unit insignia

The 1st Armored Brigade Combat Team, 34th Infantry Division is an Armored Brigade Combat Team of the Minnesota Army National Guard. It is part of the 34th Infantry Division.

== Early history ==
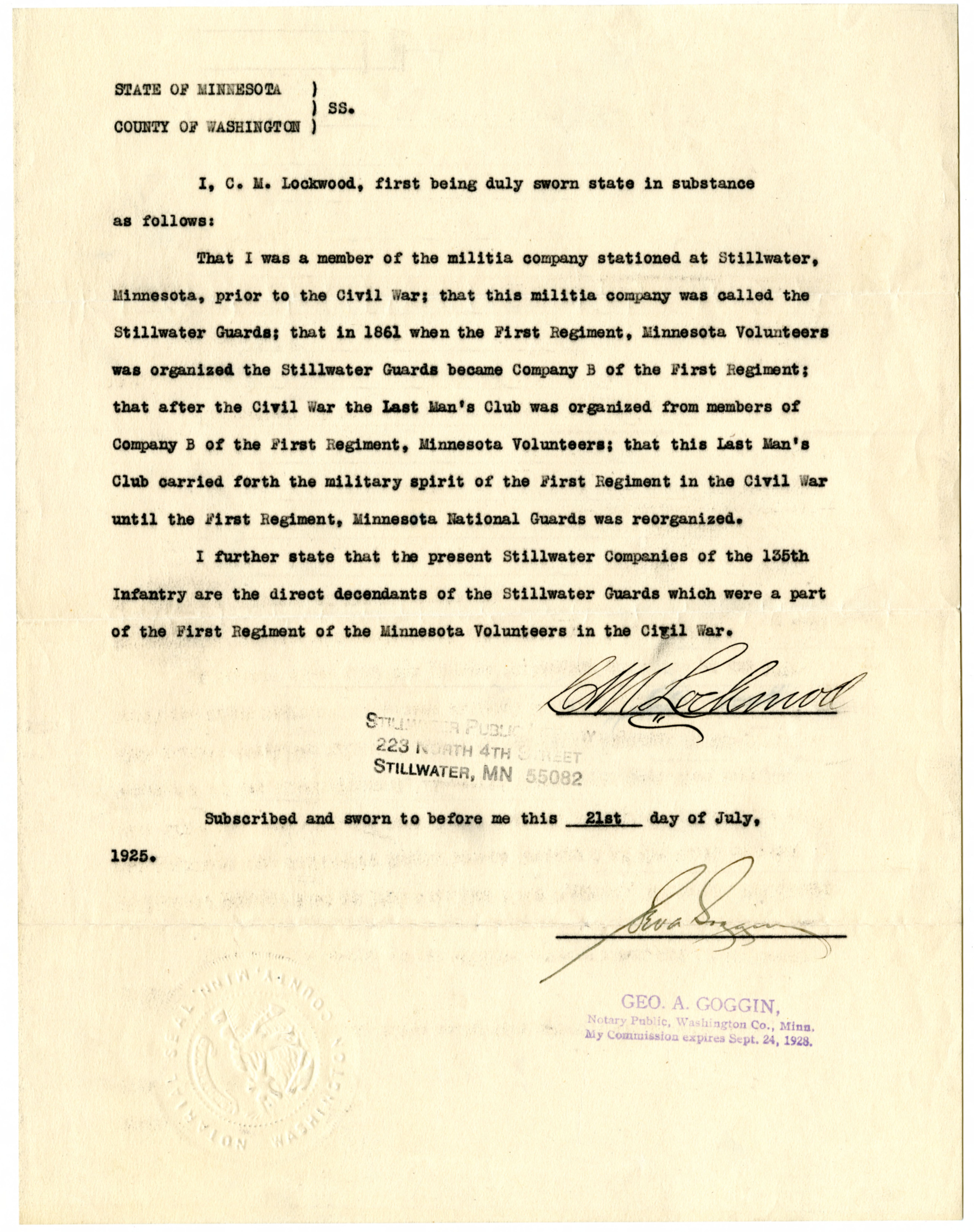
Affidavit of C.M. Lockwood describing the history of Company B, 1st Minnesota Volunteers and the Stillwater Guards.

The lineage of Headquarters, 1st ABCT, dates back to the American Civil War. A volunteer militia unit, the Stillwater Guards, had been enrolled into Minnesota's organized militia, and in 1861 was called to federal service as Company B, 1st Minnesota Volunteer Infantry Regiment. The 1st Minnesota Regiment was reorganized as 1st Battalion, Minnesota Volunteer Infantry in 1864. In February 1865, the battalion was again reformed as the 1st Minnesota Infantry Regiment. The regiment was mustered out in July 1865, following the end of the war.

== Spanish–American War ==
In 1883, the Minnesota National Guard organized a new Stillwater unit, Company K, 1st Infantry Regiment. This unit served in the Philippines during the Spanish–American War when the regiment was federalized as the 13th Minnesota Volunteer Infantry.

In 1912, Company K, 1st Infantry Regiment was re-designated Company K, 3rd Infantry Regiment. The unit was called to federal service in 1916 during the Pancho Villa Expedition.

== World War I ==
Company K was called to federal service and reorganized in 1917 as Battery F, 125th Field Artillery. The 125th Field Artillery deployed to France and participated in World War I by providing individual replacements to other units. The regiment was demobilized at Camp Dodge, Iowa in 1919. In 1921 a post-World War I reorganization of the National Guard caused Battery F to be reconfigured as Headquarters, 1st Battalion, 135th Infantry Regiment and Howitzer Company, 135th Infantry.

== World War II ==
The 1st Battalion Headquarters was re-designated in 1925 as Company A, 135th Infantry, and in 1939 Howitzer Company was reorganized as Company D, 135th Infantry. Companies A and D were activated for World War II and served in the European Theater from February, 1941 to November, 1945.

== Korean War ==
In 1946, the 135th Infantry was moved from the 35th Infantry Division to the 47th, and Companies A and D were reorganized as Headquarters Company, 1st Battalion, 135th Infantry and Antitank Company, 135th Infantry.

In 1948, Antitank Company was re-designated Heavy Mortar Company, 135th Infantry. In 1951 Headquarters Company, 1st Battalion and Heavy Mortar Company were called to federal service with the 135th Infantry, which was organized with the 45th Infantry Division during the Korean War. They were released from federal service in 1954.

== Late 20th century ==
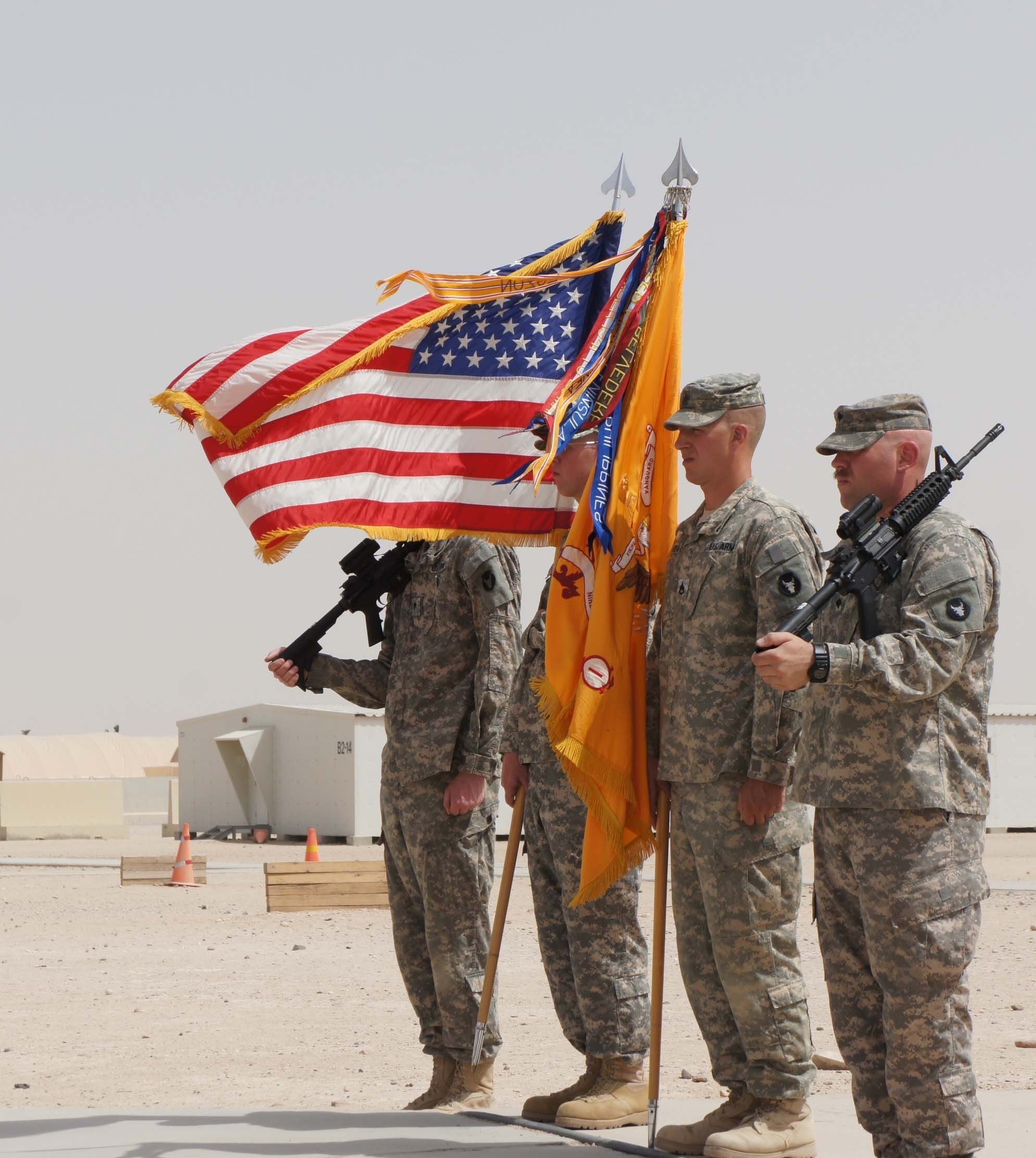
Soldiers and leaders of the 1-94th Cavalry Regiment, a squadron of the 1st Brigade Combat Team, 34th Infantry Division, gathered at Camp Buehring, Kuwait, April 3, to case their colors as the 1/34th BCT prepares to leave country and go back to Minnesota.

In 1959, the 1st Battalion Headquarters and Heavy Mortar Company were consolidated as Headquarters Company, 1st Battle Group, 135th Infantry Regiment, 47th Infantry Division. The 1st Battle Group Headquarters was reconfigured in 1963 as Headquarters Company, 1st Battalion, 135th Infantry. In 1968, the 1st Battalion Headquarters was re-designated Headquarters, 1st Brigade, 47th Infantry Division.

In 1991, the 47th Division was reflagged as the 34th Division, and the 1st Brigade, including its Headquarters, was reallocated to the 34th Infantry Division.

== 21st century ==
Since the September 11, 2001 terrorist attacks, units and individuals of 1st Brigade, 34th Division have participated in operations including homeland defense missions, the war in Iraq and the War in Afghanistan.

In 2005, the Army's conversion to modular brigades led to 1st Brigade's reorganization as 1st Armored Brigade Combat Team. The Brigade deployed to Iraq for Operation Iraq Freedom from March 2006 to July 2007. The BCT completed six months of training before deploying to Iraq from September 2005 to March 2006 at Camp Shelby, MS, this was the longest continuous deployment of any US military unit during OIF.

From 2009 to 2012 the 1st ABCT deployed to Southwest Asia and conducted security operations in Kuwait and Iraq as part of Operation New Dawn.

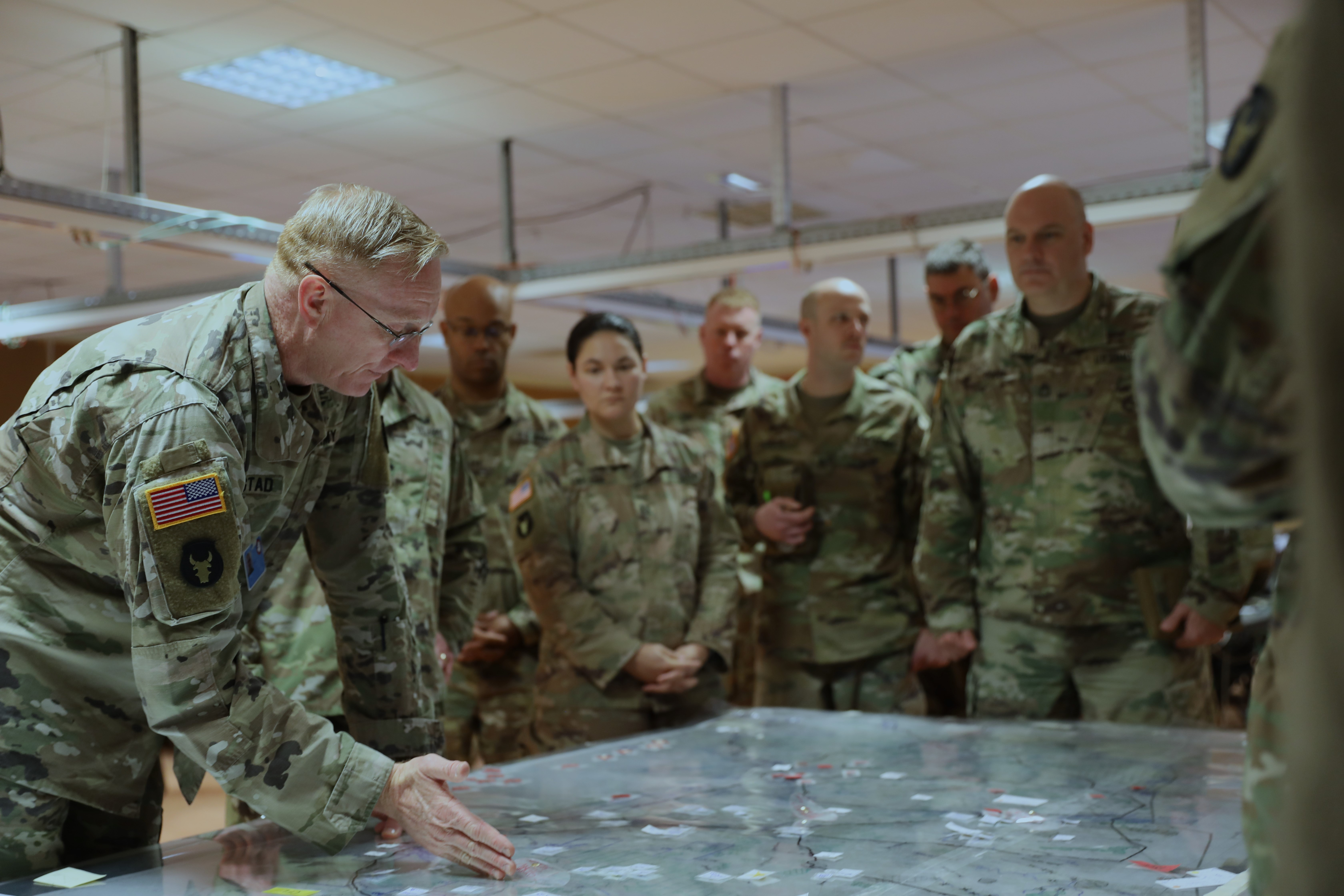
2023, in France, Exercice Orion 23

In 2017, 1/34th ABCT was planned to be in the Ready state for deployment, having spent two years preparing for its National Training Center rotation 16–07.

As of 2020, 1/34 ABCT was once again sent to the National Training Center in Ft. Irwin, CA to become certified for deployment. This was an extra challenge due to the 2020 COVID-19 global outbreak but the brigade still excelled in their training.

== Leaders ==
Commanders
- LTC Michael Klaphake, 2024 – present
- LTC Charles "Chip" Rankin, 2021 – 2023
- COL Timothy T. Kemp, 2018 – 2020
- COL Charles G. Kemper IV, 2016 – 2018
- COL Robert W. Intress, 2014 – 2016
- COL Jon A. Jensen, 2012 – 2014
- COL Eric D. Kerska, 2009 – 2012
- COL Kevin G. Gutknecht, 2008 – 2009
- COL David J. Elicerio, 2004 – 2007
- COL Joseph P. Kelly, 2003 – 2004
- COL Bert Whittington, Jr., 2002 – 2003
- COL Nicholas Ostapenko, 1999 – 2002
- COL Richard C. Nash, 1997 – 1999
- COL Terry Dorenbush, 1994 – 1997
- COL Larry W. Shellito, 1992 – 1994
- COL Jack Schlukebier, 1990 – 1992
- COL Ron L. Hein, 1987 – 1990
- COL Clayton A. Hovda, 1985 – 1987
- COL Gerald W. Forslund, 1983 – 1985
- COL John Larson, 1981 – 1983
- COL Joseph A. Forberg, 1979 – 1981
- COL Allan R. Meixner, 1978 – 1979
- COL Edward W. Waldon, 1975 – 1978
- COL James G. Sieben, 1973 – 1975
- COL Robert G. Walker, 1972 – 1973
- COL Arnold C. Anderson, 1970 – 1972
- COL Russel Williams, 1968 – 1970

Command Sergeants Major

- CSM Jim Perez, 2025 – present
- CSM Benjamin Schieber, 2023 – 2024
- CSM Rian Hofstad, 2021 – 2022
- CSM Matt Erickson, 2020
- CSM Marcus L. Erickson, 2018 – 2019
- CSM Joseph J. Hjelmstad, 2015 – 2018
- CSM John M. Lepowski, 2012 – 2015
- CSM Paul E. Herr, 2007 – 2012
- CSM Douglas L. Julin, 2002 – 2007
- CSM Steven D. Rannenberg, 1998 – 2002
- CSM Robert Boone

== Campaign participation credit ==
- Civil War – Bull Run, Peninsula, Valley, Antietam, Fredericksburg, Gettysburg, Petersburg, Virginia in 1861, Virginia in 1862, Virginia in 1863, Virginia in 1864, Virginia in 1865
- War With Spain – Manila
- Philippine Insurrection – Luzon, San Isidoro
- World War I
- World War II – Tunisia, Naples-Foggia, Anzio, Rome-Arno, North Apennines, Po Valley

== Decorations ==
- Streamer without inscription (World War I)
- French Croix de Guerre with Palm (World War II)
- Streamer embroidered BELVEDERE (World War II)

== Organization 2025 ==
- 1st Armored Brigade Combat Team, 34th Infantry Division, in Rosemount
  - Headquarters and Headquarters Company, 1st Armored Brigade Combat Team, 34th Infantry Division, in Rosemount
  - 1st Squadron, 94th Cavalry Regiment, in Duluth
    - Headquarters and Headquarters Troop, 1st Squadron, 94th Cavalry Regiment, in Duluth
    - Troop A, 1st Squadron, 94th Cavalry Regiment, in Hibbing
    - Troop B, 1st Squadron, 94th Cavalry Regiment, in Pine City
    - Troop C, 1st Squadron, 94th Cavalry Regiment, in Cloquet
    - Troop D (Tank), 1st Squadron, 94th Cavalry Regiment, in Grand Rapids
  - 1st Battalion, 145th Armored Regiment, Stow (OH) (Ohio Army National Guard)
    - Headquarters and Headquarters Company, 1st Battalion, 145th Armored Regiment, in Stow (OH)
      - Detachment 1, Headquarters and Headquarters Battery, 1st Battalion, 125th Field Artillery Regiment, in Stow (OH)
    - Company A (Tank), 1st Battalion, 145th Armored Regiment, at Camp James A. Garfield (OH)
    - Company B (Tank), 1st Battalion, 145th Armored Regiment, in North Canton (OH)
    - Company C (Mechanized Infantry), 1st Battalion, 145th Armored Regiment, in Alliance (OH)
  - 1st Battalion, 194th Armor Regiment, in Brainerd
    - Headquarters and Headquarters Company, 1st Battalion, 194th Armor Regiment, in Brainerd
    - Company A (Tank), 1st Battalion, 194th Armor Regiment, in Sauk Centre
    - Company B (Tank), 1st Battalion, 194th Armor Regiment, in St. Cloud
    - Company C (Mechanized Infantry), 1st Battalion, 194th Armor Regiment, in East Saint Paul
  - 2nd Battalion, 136th Infantry Regiment, in Moorhead
    - Headquarters and Headquarters Company, 2nd Battalion, 136th Infantry Regiment, in Moorhead
      - Detachment 1, Headquarters and Headquarters Company, 2nd Battalion, 136th Infantry Regiment, in Fergus Falls
    - Company A (Mechanized Infantry), 2nd Battalion, 136th Infantry Regiment, in Bemidji
      - Detachment 1, Company A (Mechanized Infantry), 2nd Battalion, 136th Infantry Regiment, in Detroit Lakes
    - Company B (Mechanized Infantry), 2nd Battalion, 136th Infantry Regiment, in Crookston
      - Detachment 1, Company B (Mechanized Infantry), 2nd Battalion, 136th Infantry Regiment, in Thief River Falls
    - Company C (Tank), 2nd Battalion, 136th Infantry Regiment, in Wadena
  - 1st Battalion, 125th Field Artillery Regiment, in New Ulm
    - Headquarters and Headquarters Battery, 1st Battalion, 125th Field Artillery Regiment, in New Ulm
      - Detachment 1, Headquarters and Headquarters Battery, 1st Battalion, 125th Field Artillery Regiment, in Anoka
      - Detachment 2, Headquarters and Headquarters Battery, 1st Battalion, 125th Field Artillery Regiment, in Stow (OH) — (Ohio Army National Guard)
    - Battery A, 1st Battalion, 125th Field Artillery Regiment, in Pipestone
      - Detachment 1, Battery A, 1st Battalion, 125th Field Artillery Regiment, in Luverne
    - Battery B, 1st Battalion, 125th Field Artillery Regiment, in Jackson
    - Battery C, 1st Battalion, 125th Field Artillery Regiment, in Fairmont
  - 334th Brigade Engineer Battalion, in Stillwater
    - Headquarters and Headquarters Company, 334th Brigade Engineer Battalion, in Stillwater
    - Company A (Combat Engineer), 334th Brigade Engineer Battalion, in Hutchinson
    - Company B (Engineer Support), 334th Brigade Engineer Battalion, in Litchfield
    - Company C (Signal), 334th Brigade Engineer Battalion, in Rosemount
    - Company D (Military Intelligence), 334th Brigade Engineer Battalion, in Stillwater
  - 134th Brigade Support Battalion, at Camp Ripley
    - Headquarters and Headquarters Company, 134th Brigade Support Battalion, at Camp Ripley
    - Company A (Distribution), 134th Brigade Support Battalion, in Brooklyn Park
    - Company B (Maintenance), 134th Brigade Support Battalion, at Camp Ripley
    - Company C (Medical), 134th Brigade Support Battalion, in Cottage Grove
    - Company D (Forward Support), 134th Brigade Support Battalion, in Duluth — attached to 1st Squadron, 94th Cavalry Regiment
    - Company E (Forward Support), 134th Brigade Support Battalion, in Inver Grove Heights — attached to 334th Brigade Engineer Battalion
    - Company F (Forward Support), 134th Brigade Support Battalion, in St. Peter — attached to 1st Battalion, 125th Field Artillery Regiment
      - Detachment 1, Company F (Forward Support), 134th Brigade Support Battalion, in St. James
    - Company G (Forward Support), 134th Brigade Support Battalion, at Camp Ripley — attached to 1st Battalion, 194th Armor Regiment
    - Company H (Forward Support), 134th Brigade Support Battalion, in Stow (OH) — attached to 1st Battalion, 145th Armor Regiment (Ohio Army National Guard)
    - Company I (Forward Support), 134th Brigade Support Battalion, at Camp Ripley — attached to 2nd Battalion, 136th Infantry Regiment

== External resources ==
- 1st Armored Brigade Combat Team at Minnesota National Guard
