= 94th Cavalry Regiment =

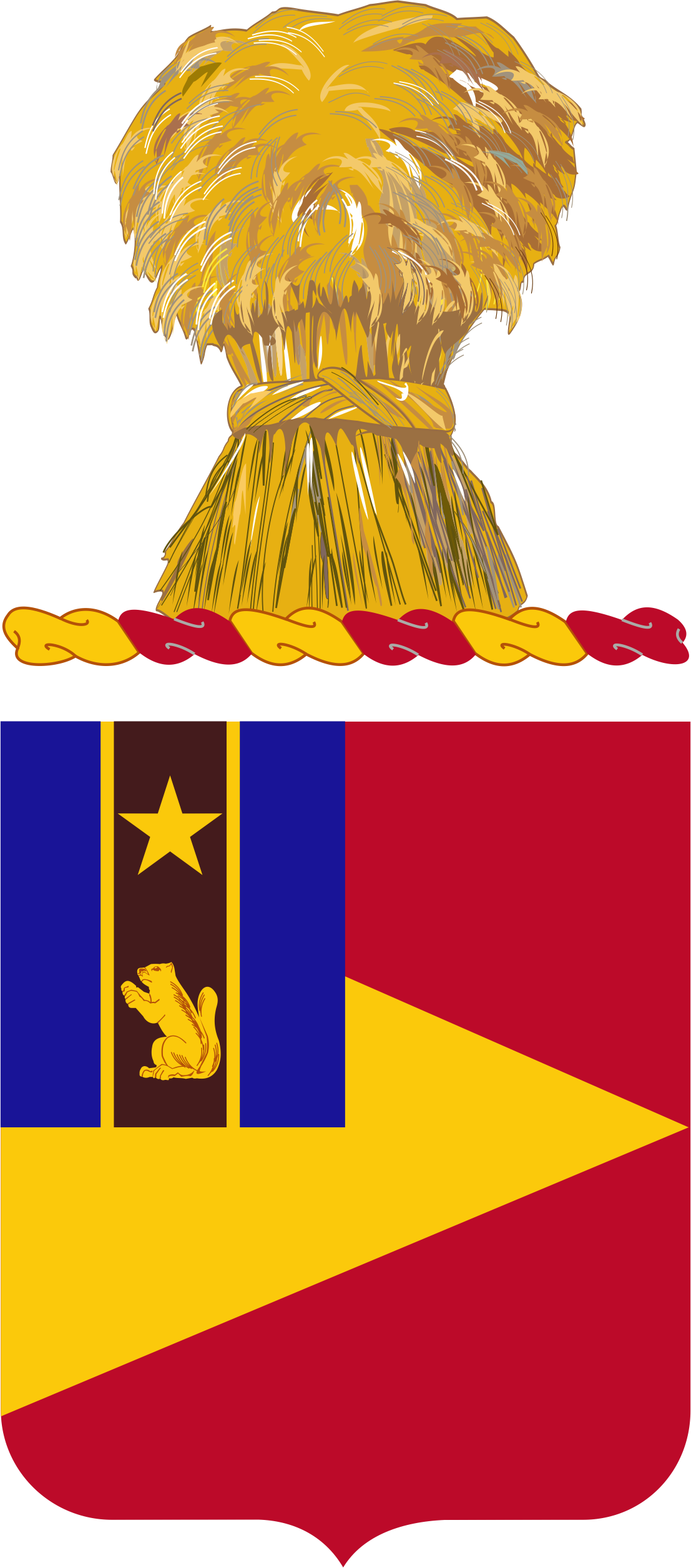
- Coat of Arms of the 94th Cavalry
- Active: 1963–present
- Country: United States
- Branch: United States Army
- Type: Reconnaissance (Parent regiment under United States Army Regimental System)
- Part of: 1st Armored Brigade Combat Team, 34th Infantry Division (1st Squadron)
- Garrison/HQ: Duluth (1st Squadron)
- Motto: "Viking Vanguard"
- Engagements: Iraq War

Commanders
- Current commander: LTC Craig Isaacson (1st Squadron)
- Notable commanders: Colonel Michael Klaphake, Lieutenant Colonel Justin Rodgers, Colonel Timothy Kemp, Colonel Rick Schute, Colonel Eddie Frizell, Major General Michael Wickman, Brandon Joseph Crotteau

Insignia
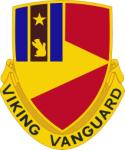
- Distinctive Unit Insignia

The 94th Cavalry Regiment is a United States Army cavalry regiment, represented in the Minnesota Army National Guard by 1st Squadron, 94th Cavalry, part of the 1st Armored Brigade Combat Team, 34th Infantry Division, stationed at Duluth.

The squadron traces its descent from the 2nd Battalion, 136th Infantry, a unit that fought in World War II. Postwar, it became part of the 194th Armor before becoming the 1st Battalion of the 94th Armor in 1972. The battalion was designated 2nd Battalion of the 194th Armor in 2002. It was deployed to Bosnia and became the 1st Squadron, 94th Cavalry, in 2005. The squadron deployed to Iraq in 2011–2012.

== History ==
=== Coast Artillery lineage ===
The 1st Squadron traces its heritage back to the organization of Company L, 5th Infantry of the Minnesota National Guard on 17 January 1919 at Redwood Falls. On 1 December 1923, the regiment became the 205th Infantry. On 1 July 1940, when the regiment was converted into the 215th Coast Artillery (Antiaircraft), Company L became Headquarters Battery of the 215th's 1st Battalion. The headquarters of the 205th's 3rd Battalion became headquarters of the 215th's 1st Battalion. The headquarters and the headquarters battery were inducted into Federal service at home stations on 6 January 1941. On 19 January it was moved to Camp Haan, California, where it conducted training.

With the regiment, the 1st Battalion's headquarters and headquarters battery staged through Camp Murray, Washington, from 7 August, and departed the Seattle Port of Embarkation on 29 August. On 3 September, it arrived at Fort Greely, Alaska, where it spent most of World War II. As the Japanese threat to Alaska lessened, the regiment returned to Seattle on 29 February 1944 and arrived at Fort Bliss on 22 March 1944, where the 215th was disbanded. On 1 July 1944, it was reorganized and redesignated as headquarters and headquarters battery (HHB) of the 598th Antiaircraft Artillery Gun Battalion, and was inactivated on 29 October at Camp Maxey.

On 1 October 1946, the 598th was reorganized and Federally recognized at Duluth. The remainder of the battalion was organized anew. It was broken up on 22 February 1959 and most of its components became transport units. HHB became Headquarters and Headquarters Detachment (HHD) of the 109th Transportation Battalion (Tactical Carrier), Battery A became the 114th Transportation Company (Tactical Carrier), Battery B became part of the 125th Artillery's 1st Howitzer Battalion, Battery C became the 224th Transportation Company (Tactical Carrier), and Battery D became the 535th Transportation Company (Tactical Carrier).

=== Infantry and armor lineage ===
The other unit in the 94th Cavalry's lineage, the 2nd Battalion, 136th Infantry, was organized on 1 April 1942 at Camp Forrest, part of the 33rd Infantry Division. The battalion fought in the New Guinea campaign and in the Battle of Luzon, and was awarded the Philippine Presidential Unit Citation for the period between 17 October 1944 and 4 July 1945. With the division, the battalion participated in the Occupation of Japan before its inactivation on 5 February 1946 at Ōtsu. At the same time, the 136th Infantry was relieved from the 33rd Division and assigned to the 47th Infantry Division on 10 June 1946. The battalion was allocated to the Minnesota National Guard on 21 July and was reorganized and Federally recognized on 29 January 1947 with its headquarters at Hibbing. On 16 January 1951, the battalion was ordered into active Federal service at Hibbing during the Korean War, but remained stateside. To take the battalion's place at home stations, a battalion with the same designation was activated in the National Guard of the United States (NGUS) at Hibbing on 16 January 1953. On 2 December 1954, the 2nd Battalion was released from active duty and Federal recognition was simultaneously withdrawn from the NGUS unit. On 22 February 1959, the battalion was converted and redesignated as the 2nd Reconnaissance Squadron of the 194th Armor, part of the 47th Division. It became the 194th Armor's 2nd Battalion on 1 April 1963. The 194th Armor was reorganized as a parent regiment under the Combat Arms Regimental System (CARS) on 1 February 1968, consisting of the 2nd Battalion, still part of the 47th Division.

=== 94th Cavalry and 94th Armor ===
On 1 April 1963, the 109th Transportation Battalion HHD, the 114th, 224th, and 535th Transportation Companies, and Batteries A and B of the 125th Artillery's 1st Battalion, were converted, reorganized, and redesignated as the 94th Cavalry, a parent regiment under CARS. The 94th included the 1st Squadron, part of the 47th Infantry Division. While part of the 47th's 3rd Brigade, the 1st Squadron conducted annual summer training in June 1964 at Camp Ripley. In October 1965, the 1st Squadron was designated as part of the National Guard "select force", receiving extra training. On 8 January 1972, the 2nd Battalion, 194th Armor was reorganized and redesignated as the 1st Battalion, 94th Armor, part of the 47th Division. The new unit also absorbed the 1st Squadron, 94th Cavalry. On 1 June 1989, the unit was withdrawn from CARS and reorganized under the United States Army Regimental System with headquarters at Duluth. On 1 September 1991, the 47th Infantry Division was "reflagged" as the 34th Infantry Division and thus the battalion came under the 34th Division. On 1 September 1992, it was reorganized, redesignated, and consolidated to consist of the 1st Battalion, part of the 34th Division.

On 1 June 2002, the battalion was reorganized and redesignated as the 2nd Battalion, 194th Armor. It was ordered into active Federal service on 19 July 2003 for deployment to Bosnia as part of Stabilization Force, along with elements of the 34th. It relieved units of the 35th Infantry Division at Camp McGovern in September. After returning from Bosnia, the battalion was released from Federal service on 13 April 2004 and reverted to state control. On 1 September 2005, it was reorganized as the 94th Cavalry, consisting of the 1st Squadron, which was part of the 1st Armored Brigade Combat Team. On 1 October 2005, the 94th Cavalry became the 94th Cavalry Regiment.

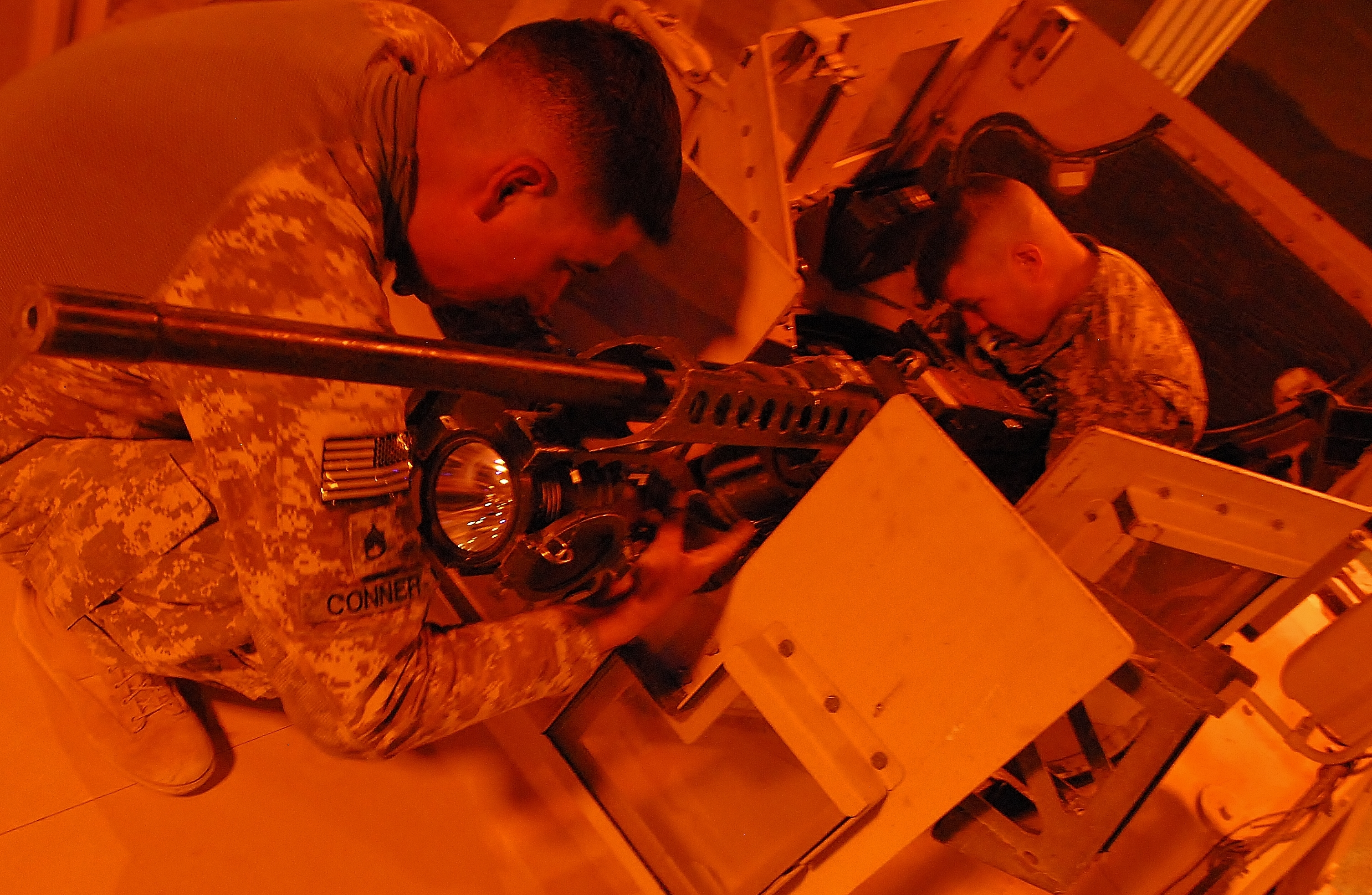
1-94 CAV soldiers at the Kuwait-Iraq border crossing, October 2011

On 24 May 2011, the 1st Squadron was ordered into active Federal service. Under the command of Lt. Col Eddie Frizell, the squadron deployed to Kuwait to provide base management, regional security and security for convoys moving between Kuwait and Iraq in support of Operation New Dawn, the United States withdrawal from Iraq. On 3 April 2012, the 1st Squadron cased its colors at Camp Buehring as it prepared to leave Kuwait to return to the United States after the completion of Operation New Dawn. It was released from active Federal service after return to Minnesota on 26 June 2012. In 2015, the squadron participated in the eXportable Combat Training Capabilities (XCTC) exercise, which included live-fire drills at the platoon level. At the time, the 1st Squadron was commanded by Lieutenant Colonel Timothy Kemp; 1st Squadron's headquarters and headquarters troop were based in Duluth, A Troop in Hibbing, B Troop in Pine City, and C Troop in Cloquet.

=== Leaders ===
Since 1 October 2005 reflagging as the 94th Cavalry Regiment.

Commanders

- LTC Craig D. Isaacson, May 2026 – present
- LTC Peter B. Rampaart, – May 2026
- LTC Michael Klaphake, 2020
- LTC Timothy T. Kemp, 2014 –
- LTC Richard T. Schute, 2012 – 2014
- LTC Eddie M. Frizell, 2012 – 2012
- LTC Eddie M. Frizell, 2009 – 2011
- LTC Michael D. Wickman, 2008 – 2009 (FWD)

Command Sergeants Major

- CSM Derek Daniels
- CSM Teshan Harrington
- CSM Kenneth Tschida, April 2022 –
- CSM Thomas J. Roach, 2020
- CSM Rodney G. Vredenburg, 2017 – 2020
- CSM Robert L. Klinkner, 2015 – 2017
- CSM Brian C. Newcomer, 2014 – 2015
- CSM Brian G. Soper, 2012 – 2014
- CSM Daniel M. Essig, 2009 – 2012
- CSM Brian G. Soper, 2005 – 2009
