= Cole Memorial Building =

- A.L. Cole Memorial Building
- U.S. National Register of Historic Places
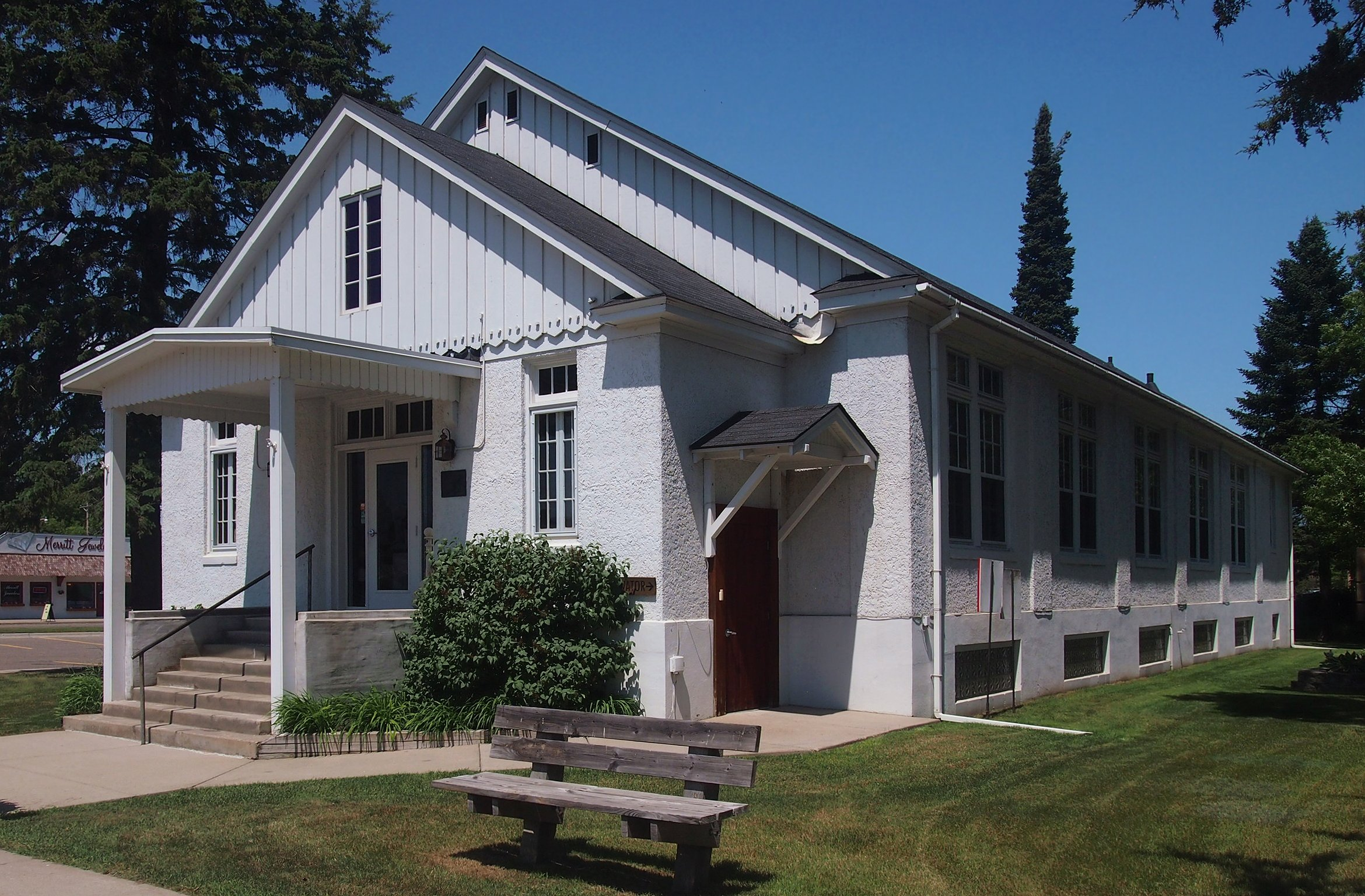
- The A.L. Cole Memorial Building from the southeast

- Location within Minnesota Location within the United States
- Location: 4285 Tower Square, Pequot Lakes, Minnesota
- Coordinates: 46°36′13″N 94°18′51″W
- Area: Less than one acre
- Built: 1937
- Architect: P. C. Bettenburg
- MPS: Federal Relief Construction in Minnesota, 1933–1941
- NRHP reference No.: 04000530
- Designated: May 26, 2004

The Cole Memorial Building is a historic municipal event hall in Pequot Lakes, Minnesota, United States. It was built in 1937 with New Deal funding, generating jobs and revenue for a community suffering the effects of the Great Depression. With an auditorium large enough to seat 400 people, the Cole Memorial Building served as a key venue for numerous local events. From 1941 to 1967 it was converted into a municipally-run cinema, the Lakes Theater, whose profits were channeled back into community improvements. The building was listed on the National Register of Historic Places in 2004 as the A.L. Cole Memorial Building for having local significance in the themes of entertainment/recreation, politics/government, and social history. It was nominated for illustrating the long-lived benefits and substantial return on investment achieved with New Deal funding.

The Cole Memorial Building now houses a senior center and a museum operated by the Pequot Lakes Historical Society.

== Description ==
The Cole Memorial Building measures 40 by 90 feet (12.2 by 27.4 m) and has a full basement, a ground floor, and two small half-story attic spaces at the north and south ends. The walls are reinforced concrete with a stucco finish, though the gables are framed with vertical wood siding.

The south end of the building has a projecting gabled vestibule with a porch over the centered entrance. There is a pair of three-pane transom windows over the front door, and four tiny windows near the apex of the main gable which light the attic space. Perched atop the porch roof for most of the building's history but no longer extant was a small room serving as the projection booth.

The east and west walls are divided into six bays, most of which have pairs of six-over-six sash windows topped by three-pane fixed windows on the main floor, and glass block windows for the basement level.

Inside, the vestibule provides a staircase to the basement, a coatroom on the left, and an office on the right. A small storage room next to the office contained a ladder up to the projection booth. Beyond the vestibule the main floor was mostly open space serving as the auditorium, with a 23-by-25-foot (7.0 by 7.6 m) stage flanked by stairways and dressing rooms. The stage, with its proscenium arch, was lost in the building's 1967 conversion into a senior center. The basement originally had a hallway with doors leading to a dining room, a kitchen, a furnace room, and boys' and girls' locker rooms with toilets and showers.

Immediately behind the building is a small pump house, which is included in the property's National Register nomination.

== Construction ==
The park in which Pequot Lakes' Cole Memorial Building stands was donated by Fay Cole Andrus in December 1935 to be used as a public space in memory of her father, A. L. Cole, one of the town's founders and early merchants. Three months later the Pequot Commercial Club suggested that the village council take advantage of federal work relief funding to construct a recreation hall on the site. Minneapolis-based architect P. C. Bettenburg agreed to the project in advance and submitted plans to the Works Progress Administration (WPA).

The WPA was among several programs created by the Franklin D. Roosevelt administration to combat unemployment during the Great Depression by funding labor-intensive infrastructure and service projects of public benefit. As was typical, the WPA paid the workers—mostly unemployed local men plus a few key skilled workers—while the local government covered the cost of materials. These supplies and equipment were acquired from local merchants, further benefiting the area's economy.

Construction began on April 3, 1937, employing 24 full-time equivalent workers for three months. The completed Cole Memorial Building was dedicated in a ceremony on July 1. The following year the village applied for additional WPA funds to landscape the park grounds further.

== Use ==
The Cole Memorial Building initially provided much-needed space for a wide variety of activities. The auditorium could seat up to 400 people, nearly the entire population of the village. The school used it for plays, speech contests, and graduation ceremonies. The village council and Sibley Township board met there, as did local Boy Scout, 4-H, American Legion, and Grange clubs. Traveling performers and lecturers took to the stage, while community celebrations and fairs were held on the grounds outside. By February 1939 the village had hired a recreation director to manage activities at the hall, which included craft and game nights, an archery club, and a community forum where citizens could discuss issues of the day.

Rental fees, mostly levied on the traveling performers, were not generating enough revenue for the building's maintenance costs, however. The Pequot Commercial Club proposed converting the Cole Memorial Building into a movie theater, which would provide a steadier income. The club assumed full management in November 1939 and launched free movie screenings the following year. In 1941 the hall was modified into a first-rate cinema, with new projection equipment and cushioned chairs arranged in sloped auditorium seating. The debut movie in the refitted hall was One Foot in Heaven on December 9, 1941, followed the next week by The Maltese Falcon. Over the years the latest Hollywood movies would screen in Pequot Lakes just as they did in major cities around the nation.

Although tickets cost 12¢ or less for children and 35¢ or less for adults, the cinema proved to be a significant money-maker, bolstered by the growing numbers of summer tourists. The Commercial Club was able to self-fund maintenance and upgrades for the building while proceeds were channeled into community improvements. By mid-1953 the theater had generated $25,000 in profits that went toward a new medical clinic, street paving, the fire department, and local schools. Community groups continued to meet in the hall, and no longer had to pay any kind of rental fee.

== Later history ==
The widespread adoption of television finally caused movie attendance to drop, and new local venues such as a high school auditorium reduced the Cole Memorial Building's importance as an event space. The hall's final film screening took place in August 1967. The year before a seniors club had been organized in the building, and they took the opportunity to repurpose it into a senior center. The sloping auditorium floor was removed and the stage area was converted into a kitchen and restrooms.

The basement remained largely disused for decades, but in 1997 the Pequot Lakes Historical Society organized and developed the lower level into a local history museum. Exhibits are specialized on the 1930s and 1940s, with displays on military service as well as period recreations of a local classroom, kitchen, bedroom, and general store. A display on the building's history as a movie theater includes original projection equipment and seating.

The park surrounding the building was originally much larger, with a baseball diamond to the north, but that parcel was sold off in 1983. In 2007 the historical society and the city government received a grant from the Minnesota Historical Society that allowed them to renovate the building's main floor. The hardwood floors were restored, new windows installed, interior walls painted, the kitchen improved, and an elevator installed. The building continues to be available for events.

== See also ==
- National Register of Historic Places listings in Crow Wing County, Minnesota
