= White Bear Lake Armory =

- U.S. National Register of Historic Places
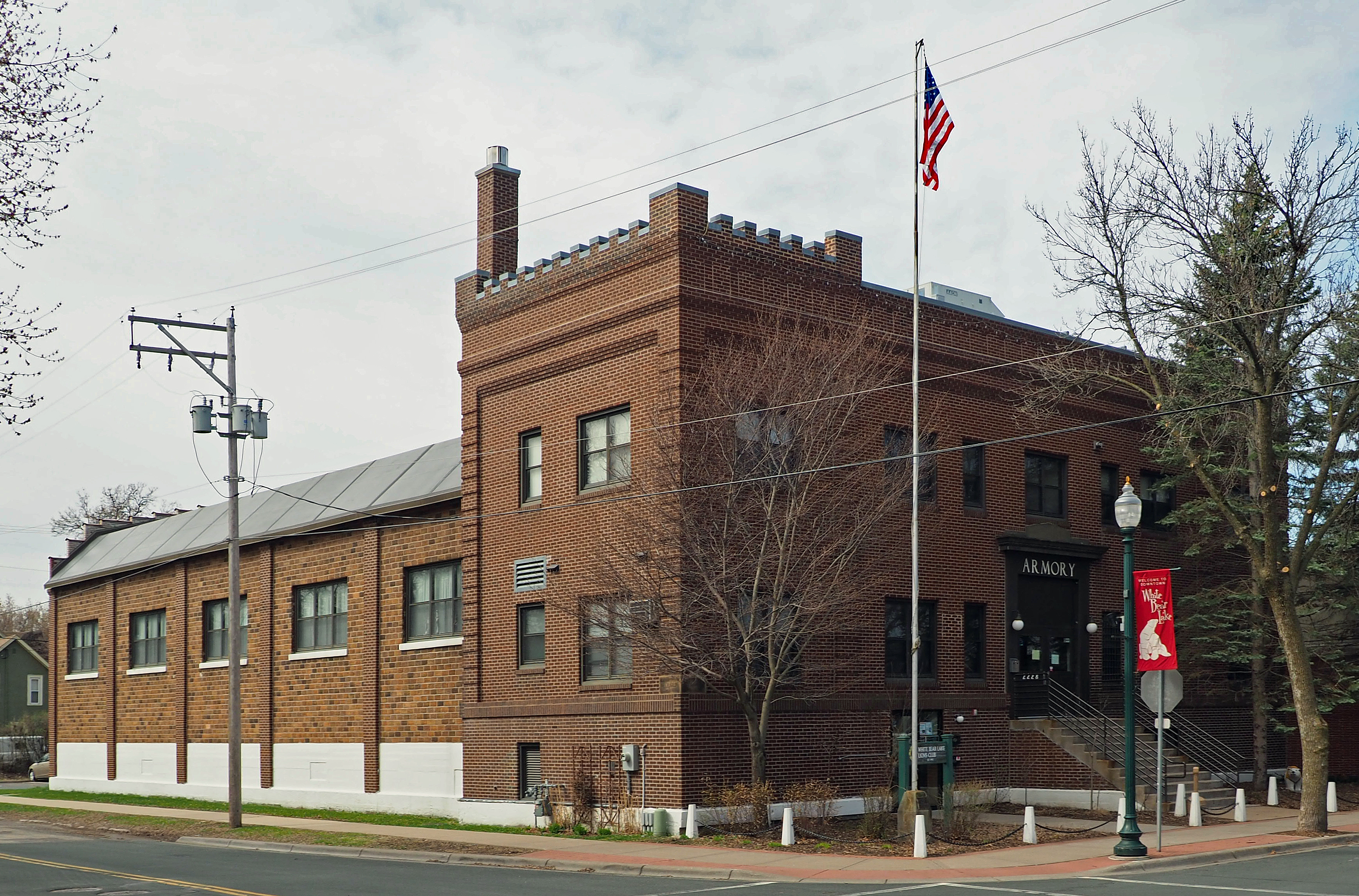

- Location within Minnesota
- Location: 2228 4th St., White Bear Lake, Minnesota
- Coordinates: 45°05′06″N 93°00′23″W
- Area: 0.28 acres (0.11 ha)
- NRHP reference No.: 100003532
- Added to NRHP: March 25, 2019

White Bear Lake Armory in White Bear Lake, Minnesota was constructed in 1922–1923 as part of an expansion effort by the National Guard after the National Defense Act of 1920. The armory building's architecture reflects traditional castellated designs but also indicates a transition to more restrained designs. It was designed by P. C. Bettenburg and was listed on the National Register of Historic Places in 2019. The building now houses the White Bear Lake Area Historical Society.

The building has two sections: a two-story, flat-roofed, rectangular block used for administration, and a one-story, bowstring-roofed drill hall. The administration section is clad in brick and has crenellations on portions of the roofline, as well as brick quoining, pilasters, and a combination of a cornice, frieze, and architrave. The interior of the drill hall is one large open space and is marked as a basketball court. The drill hall also has a basement, which once contained a shooting range. The administration section has a catering kitchen, rooms for storage, and two offices on the second floor used by the White Bear Lake Area Historical Society.

Besides National Guard functions, the armory was also used for community functions such as dances, roller skating, concerts, appearances by Santa Claus, carnivals, and sporting events. The building was hit by a devastating fire on December 7, 1928, which destroyed most of the front of the building. The administration section of the building was renovated and revised somewhat from its original appearance. From 1930 until the start of World War II, the armory still hosted events, but was not regarded as a community center.

In September 1941, the building was hit by a tornado, damaging the roof of the drill hall. More repairs were made, and some strengthening was done. Some remodeling was done in the 1960s with three classrooms being built, along with updates to the building's mechanical systems. It was an older building at this point, though, and in the early 1970s, White Bear Lake was slated to receive a new armory building. This got a lukewarm response because there would be a cost to the city and because there were other options for a community facility, so a new armory was not built.

In 1992, The Pentagon directed the National Guard to reduce its forces, and the state of Minnesota sought cost savings by closing older armories. The White Bear Lake Armory was selected to be closed because it had insufficient space for monthly training, it needed repairs, and it lacked accessibility. The building was turned over to the City of White Bear Lake that fall. In 1995, major renovations were accomplished such as replacing the front stairway, adding an elevator and new restrooms, adding a small kitchen in the administration block, and more updates to the building's mechanical systems. The drill hall is currently used for community events and is available for rental, while the administration section is used by the White Bear Lake Area Historical Society and the local Lions Club.
