= 125th Field Artillery Regiment =

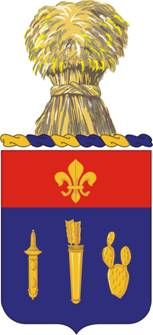
- Coat of arms
- Country: United States
- Branch: United States Army
- Type: Field artillery
- Role: USARS parent regiment
- Size: Regiment
- Engagements: World War I World War II

The 125th Field Artillery Regiment is a field artillery regiment of the Minnesota Army National Guard. The regiment's 1st Battalion is the 155 mm, self-propelled cannon battalion assigned to the 1st Armored Brigade Combat Team, 34th Infantry Division.

== History ==
Section under development

1st Battalion operates M109 Artillery pieces.

== Lineage and honors ==
=== Lineage ===
- Organized 15 April 1887 in the Minnesota Reserve National Guard as the 3rd Infantry Regiment with headquarters at St. Paul
- Recognized in 1889 in the National Guard of Minnesota
- Reorganized and redesignated 4 May 1898 as the 14th Minnesota Volunteer Infantry
- Mustered into Federal service 8 May 1898 at St. Paul; mustered out of Federal service 18 November 1898 at Fort Snelling, Minnesota
- Reorganized in 1900 in the Minnesota National Guard as the 3d Infantry with headquarters at Duluth
- Mustered into Federal service 30 June 1916 at Fort Snelling, Minnesota; mustered out of Federal service 19 December 1916 at Fort Snelling, Minnesota
- Mustered into Federal service 24 July 1917; drafted into Federal service 5 August 1917
- Converted and redesignated 1 October 1917 as the 125th Field artillery and assigned to the 34th Division
- Demobilized 22 January 1919 at Camp Dodge, Iowa
- Reorganized 1921–1926 in the Minnesota National Guard as the 125th Field Artillery and assigned to the 34th Division; Headquarters Federally recognized 24 July 1924 at Duluth
- Inducted into Federal service 10 February 1941 at home stations
- Headquarters, 125th Field Artillery, disbanded 1 February 1942; 1st Battalion concurrently reorganized and redesignated as the 125th Field Artillery Battalion, an element of the 34th Infantry Division (remainder of regiment—hereafter separate lineages)
- 125th Field artillery Battalion inactivated 3 November 1945 at Camp Patrick Henry, Virginia
- Relieved 10 June 1946 from assignment to the 34th infantry Division
- Consolidated 20 February 1947 with Headquarters, 125th Field Artillery (reconstituted 5 August 1945 in the Minnesota National Guard), and consolidated unit reorganized and Federally recognized as the 125th Field Artillery Battalion, with headquarters at Anoka, and assigned to the 47th Infantry Division
- Ordered into active Federal service 16 January 1951 at home stations

(125th Field artillery Battalion [NGUS] organized and Federally recognized 16 January 1953 with headquarters at Anoka.)

- Released 2 December 1954 from active Federal service and reverted to state control; Federal recognition concurrently withdrawn from the 125th Field Artillery Battalion (NGUS)
- Consolidated 22 February 1959 with the 257th Antiaircraft Artillery Battalion (see ANNEX) to form the 125th Artillery, a parent regiment under the Combat Arms Regimental System, to consist of the 1st, 2d, and 3d Howitzer Battalions, elements of the 47th Infantry Division
- Reorganized 1 April 1963 to consist of the 2d and 3d Battalions, elements of the 47th Infantry Division
- Reorganized 1 February 1968 to consist of the 1st Battalion and the 2d Battalion, an element of the 47th Infantry Division
- Redesignated 1 May 1972 as the 125th Field Artillery
- Reorganized 1 April 1977 to consist of the 1st Battalion
- Withdrawn 30 November 1988 from the Combat Arms Regimental System and reorganized under the United States Army Regimental System
- Reorganized 1 September 1992 to consist of the 1st Battalion, an element of the 34th Infantry Division

ANNEX

- Constituted 28 June 1946 in the Minnesota National Guard as the 257th Antiaircraft Artillery Automatic Weapons Battalion
- Organized and Federally recognized 22 October 1946 with headquarters at Cloquet
- Reorganized and redesignated 16 July 1951 as the 257th Antiaircraft Artillery Gun Battalion. redesignated 1 October 1953 as the 257th Antiaircraft Artillery Battalion

=== Campaign participation credit ===
- World War I: Streamer without inscription
- World War II: Tunisia; Naples-Foggia; Anzio; Rome-Arno; North Apennines; Po Valley

Battery B (Jackson) and Battery C (St. James), 1st Battalion, each additionally entitled to:
- World War II: Rhineland; Central Europe

=== Decorations ===
- French Croix de Guerre with Palm, World War ii, Streamer embroidered BELVEDERE (125th Field Artillery Battalion cited; DA GO 43, 1950

== Heraldry ==
=== Coat of arms ===
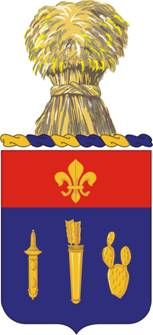

- Shield: Azure, between a sheathed Roman sword, point to base, and a prickly pear cactus, an Indian quiver holding two arrows or; on a chief gules a fleur‑de‑lis of the second.
- Crest: that for the regiments and separate battalions of the Minnesota Army National Guard: On a wreath of the colors, or and azure, a sheaf of wheat proper.
- Motto: Faithful.
- Symbolism: The shield is blue for infantry, and the organization's service as infantry is indicated by the sheathed Roman sword, taken from the service medal of the War with Spain, for service in that war; the Indian quiver with arrows is symbolic of the Leach Lake Indian uprising, and the prickly pear cactus for service on the Mexican border. the chief is red for artillery and with the fleur‑de‑lis commemorates the organization's service as field artillery in France during World War I.

== See also ==
- 34th Infantry Division
