= Philip C. Bettenburg =

American architect, engineer, military officer (1900–1968)

- Born: Philip Charles Christian Bettenburg; September 23, 1900; Minnesota, United States
- Died: March 20, 1968 (aged 67); Saint Paul, Minnesota, United States
- Other name: Philip Charles Bettenburg
- Education: University of St. Thomas; University of Minnesota
- Military career
- Branch: United States Army; National Guard
- Rank: Major General
- Nickname: "P.C."
- Commands: 47th Infantry Division
- Conflicts: World War II
- Other work: Architect, engineer

Philip Charles Bettenburg (September 23, 1900 – March 20, 1968) was an American architect, engineer, and military officer. He was a career officer in the U.S. Army and National Guard. His architecture firm's office was in St. Paul, Minnesota, and his work includes many armory buildings; several buildings he designed are listed on the National Register of Historic Places (NRHP). His architecture firm was Bettenburg, Townsend, Stolte, and Comb.

== Life and career ==
Philip Charles Bettenburg was born on September 23, 1900, in Minnesota. Bettendburg attended Saint Thomas Academy, the private military high school in Mendota Heights. During the summer time in high school, he worked for the Great Northern Railroad.

He graduated with a degree in civil engineering from the University of St. Thomas in St. Paul, and the University of Minnesota's School of Architecture.

Bettenburg served during World War II in the U.S. Army as an infantry regimental commander and lieutenant colonel in North Africa and Europe. He became commander of Minnesota's 47th Infantry Division of the National Guard in 1954. Bettenburg was a major in the Minneapolis National Guard, until he retired in 1958.

He worked for architect Max Otto Buelow, before establishing his own firm, Bettenburg, Townsend, Stolte, & Comb.

He was president of the St. Paul Chapter of the American Institute of Architects, and the Society of American Military Engineers.

Bettenburg lived at 200 North Mississippi River Blvd. in St. Paul with his wife and son.

== Death and legacy ==
Bettenburg died on March 20, 1968, in St. Joseph's Hospital in St. Paul.

The P. C. Bettenburg collection can be found in the libraries of the University of Minnesota.

== List of works ==
=== Works on the National Register of Historic Places ===
- White Bear Lake Armory (1922–1923), White Bear Lake, Minnesota; NRHP listed
- Minneapolis Armory (1935), Minneapolis, Minnesota; NRHP listed
- A.L. Cole Memorial Building (1937), Pequot Lakes, Minnesota; NRHP listed
- Tracy Municipal Building and Armory (1938), Tracy, Minnesota; NRHP listed
- Duluth Armory (1941 addition), Duluth, Minnesota; NRHP listed

=== Other works ===
- Brainerd Armory (1936), Brainerd, Minnesota
- Anoka City Hall (1954), Anoka, Minnesota
- Northwestern Hospital (c. 1958, now Sanford Thief River Falls Medical Center), Thief River Falls, Minnesota
- Sheridan School (1960), St. Paul, Minnesota
- Edgewater Baptist Church (1961), Minneapolis, Minnesota

Military offices
Preceded by Norman E. Hendrickson	Commanding General of the 47th Infantry Division; January 25, 1954 – January 31, 1958	Succeeded by Richard Cook
