= 205th Infantry Regiment (United States) =

Former United States infantry unit

5th Infantry, Minnesota National Guard 205th Infantry Regiment 215th Coastal Artillery Regiment
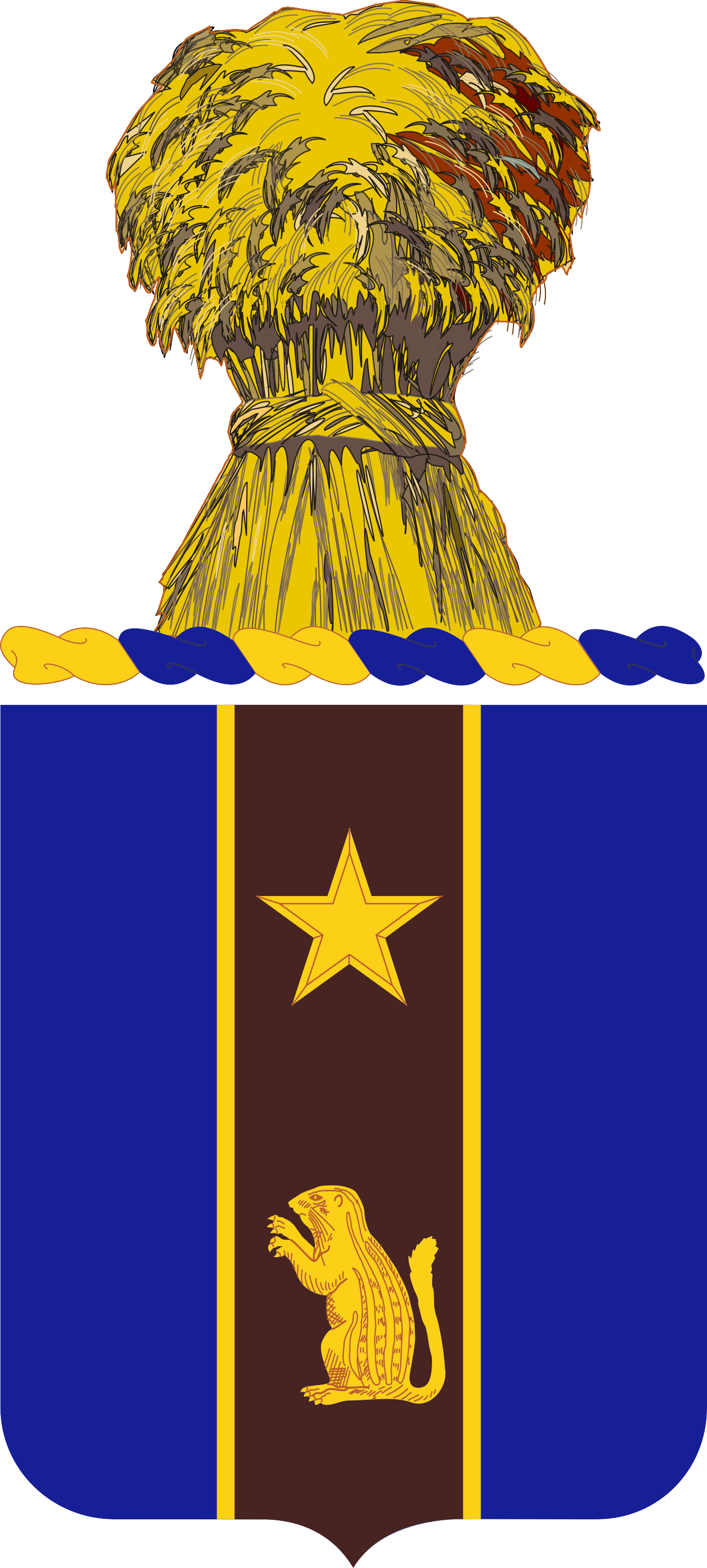
- Coat of arms of the 205th Infantry Regiment
- Active: 1919–1940
- Country: United States
- Allegiance: Minnesota
- Branch: Minnesota National Guard (1919–1940)
- Type: Infantry
- Size: Regiment
- Motto: "Pour La Patrie" (For the Fatherland)
- Engagements: Interwar Period; Minneapolis General Strike of 1934; World War II; Aleutian Islands Campaign (as 215th Coast Artillery)

Commanders
- Notable commanders: Colonel Walter S. Fulton; Colonel Maurice Dundan Welty; Colonel Ivan Bowen

The 205th Infantry Regiment was an infantry regiment of the Minnesota Army National Guard. Officially established on January 17, 1919, during the interwar period, the unit was primarily used as riot control in 1921, 1922, 1933, and 1934, especially during the Minneapolis general strike of 1934. Remnants of the regiment were later converted and reorganized in July 1940 as the 215th Coast Artillery anti-aircraft battery and served during World War II in the Aleutian Islands campaign.

== History ==
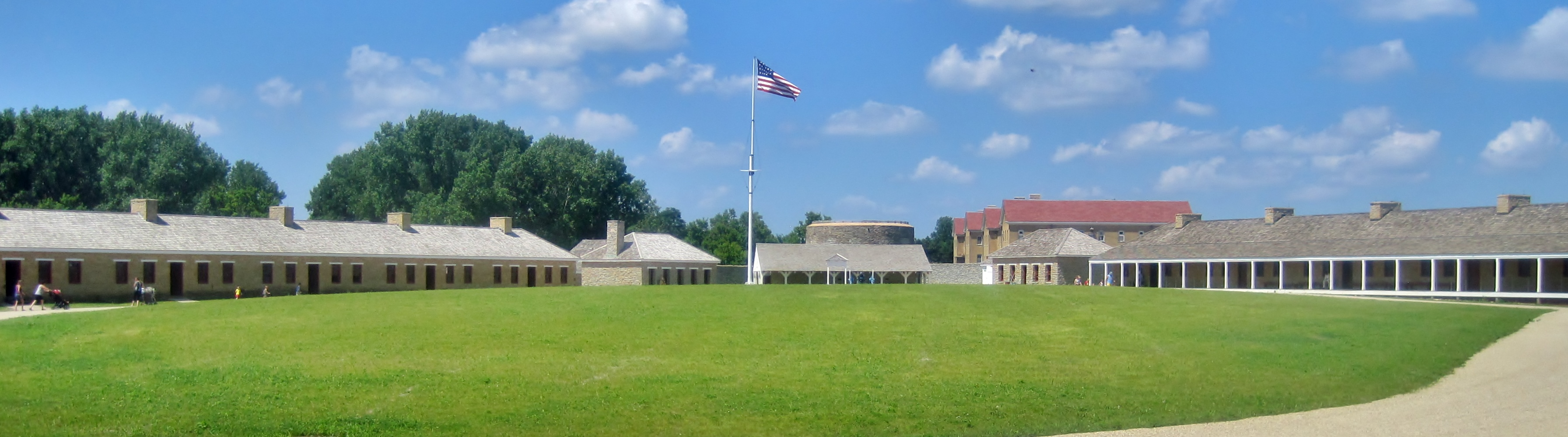
Fort Snelling near Saint Paul, Minnesota where the 205th Infantry Regiment often drilled.

=== Establishment ===
In 1903 the Militia Act was passed, the act laid out the circumstances in which the National Guard could be federalized and organized the Guard like the regular United States Army. The regiment was organized on January 17, 1919 as the 5th Infantry of the Minnesota National Guard and was headquartered in Mankato, Minnesota. The regiment was originally commanded by Colonel Walter S. Fulton from September 24, 1920, to July 31, 1924. Other commanders of the regiment include Colonel Maurice Dundan Welty (August 3, 1924 – September 4, 1928) and Colonel Ivan Bowen (September 4, 1928 – July 1, 1940).

=== Interwar era ===
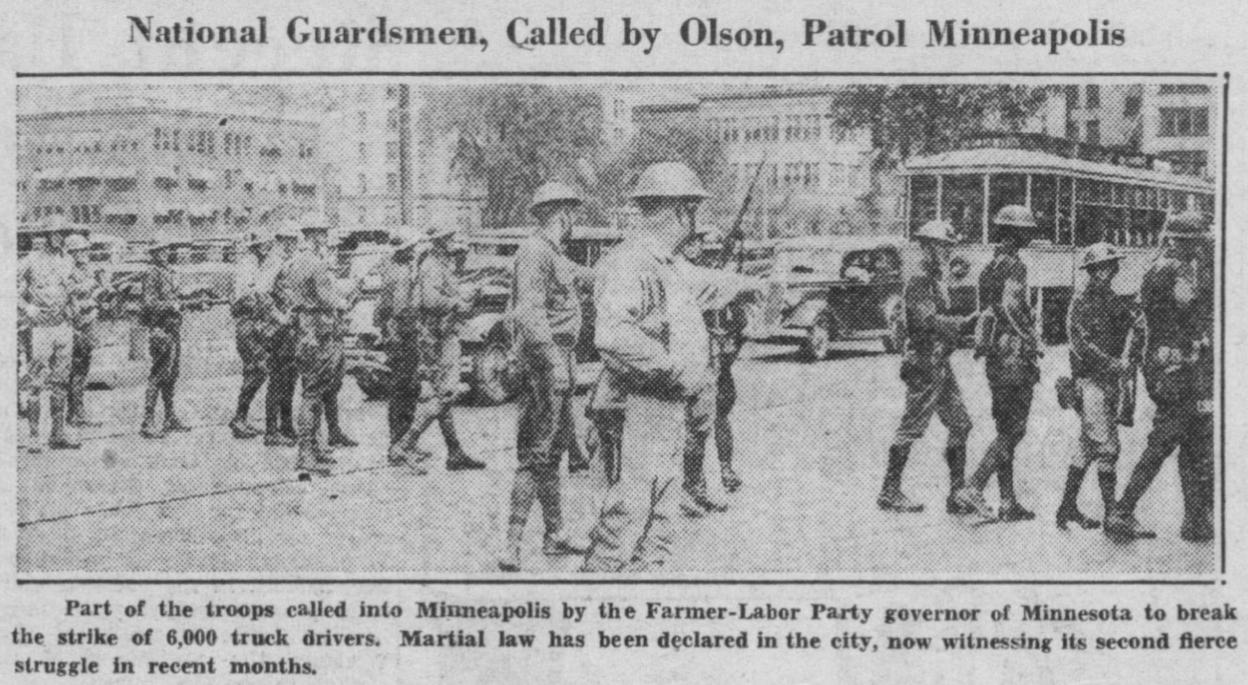
National Guardsmen of the 205th and 206th Infantry Regiments, called by Governor of Minnesota Floyd B. Olson, patrol the streets of Minneapolis during the Minneapolis general strike of 1934. Courtesy of the Daily Worker, July 30, 1934.

On December 1, 1923, the 5th Infantry of the Minnesota National Guard was redesignated as the 205th Infantry Regiment and assigned to the 92nd Infantry Brigade on 22 April 1927. Various companies of the regiment were spread throughout the state, for example, Company D of the 205th Infantry Regiment were stationed at the St. Peter Armory in St. Peter, Minnesota, Company K were stationed in Rochester, Minnesota, Company L came from Redwood Falls, Minnesota, and the Regimental Band came from New Ulm, Minnesota. The regiment was used heavily as riot control during the 1920's and 1930's in Minnesota, especially during the Minneapolis general strike of 1934. According to MNopedia "In the years between the World Wars the Minnesota National Guard was called to duty more than thirty times".

The regiment, or elements thereof, were called up to perform the following state duties:

- Entire regiment for riot control during a workers' strike at the Swift and Armour meat packing plants in Saint Paul, Minnesota, December 6, 1921 – February 11, 1922.
- Entire regiment for riot control during a commercial transit workers’ strike, at Minneapolis in May 1934 and July 17 – August 23, 1934.
- Conducted annual summer training at Lake City, Minnesota; Fort Snelling; and Camp Ripley. For at least two years, in 1938 and 1940, the regiment also trained some 48 company-grade officers of the 88th Infantry Division at Camp Ripley.
- Regiment converted, reorganized and redesignated July 1, 1940, as the 215th Coastal Artillery and assigned to the 101st Coastal Artillery Brigade.

=== World War II ===
In 1940 elements of the 205th Infantry Regiment were federalized, constituted, and redesignated as the 215th Coast Artillery, headquartered in Mankato, Minnesota. The unit was organized on July 1, 1940, and consisted of the 1st and 2nd battalions of both the 205th Infantry Regiment and the 206th Infantry Regiment of the Minnesota Army National Guard. The regiment was inducted into federal service on January 6, 1941, at Mankato and subsequently moved to Camp Haan on January 19, 1941. In August 1941 the unit was moved to Camp Murray and on August 7, 1941 was staged for deployment to Alaska during the Aleutian Islands campaign. The unit departed the Seattle port of entry on August 29, 1941, and arrived at Fort Greely, Alaska, southeast of Fairbanks, Alaska, on September 3, 1941. The 3rd Battalion, 215th Coast Artillery (Anti-Aircraft) Regiment was constituted May 27, 1942, and activated at Fort Greely August 1, 1942. The regiment was posted at Fort Greely until February 26, 1944, when it returned to the contiguous United States, arriving at the Seattle port of entry February 29, 1944, and moved to Fort Bliss, Texas, where the regiment was inactivated and its headquarters and headquarters battery disbanded March 25, 1944. The 1st Battalion was redesignated the 598th Anti-Aircraft Artillery (Gun) Battalion; the 2nd Battalion was redesignated the 599th Anti-Aircraft Artillery (Automatic Weapons) Battalion; and the 3rd Battalion was redesignated the 347th Anti-Aircraft Artillery (Searchlight) Battalion. The unit was disbanded in March 1944 at Fort Bliss. On July 1, 1944, it was reorganized and redesignated as headquarters and headquarters battery (HHB) of the 598th Anti-Aircraft Artillery Gun Battalion, and was inactivated on October 29 at Camp Maxey.

== Legacy units ==
Sister units of the 205th Infantry Regiment live on today currently as the 94th Cavalry Regiment of the Minnesota Army National Guard.

== Insignia ==
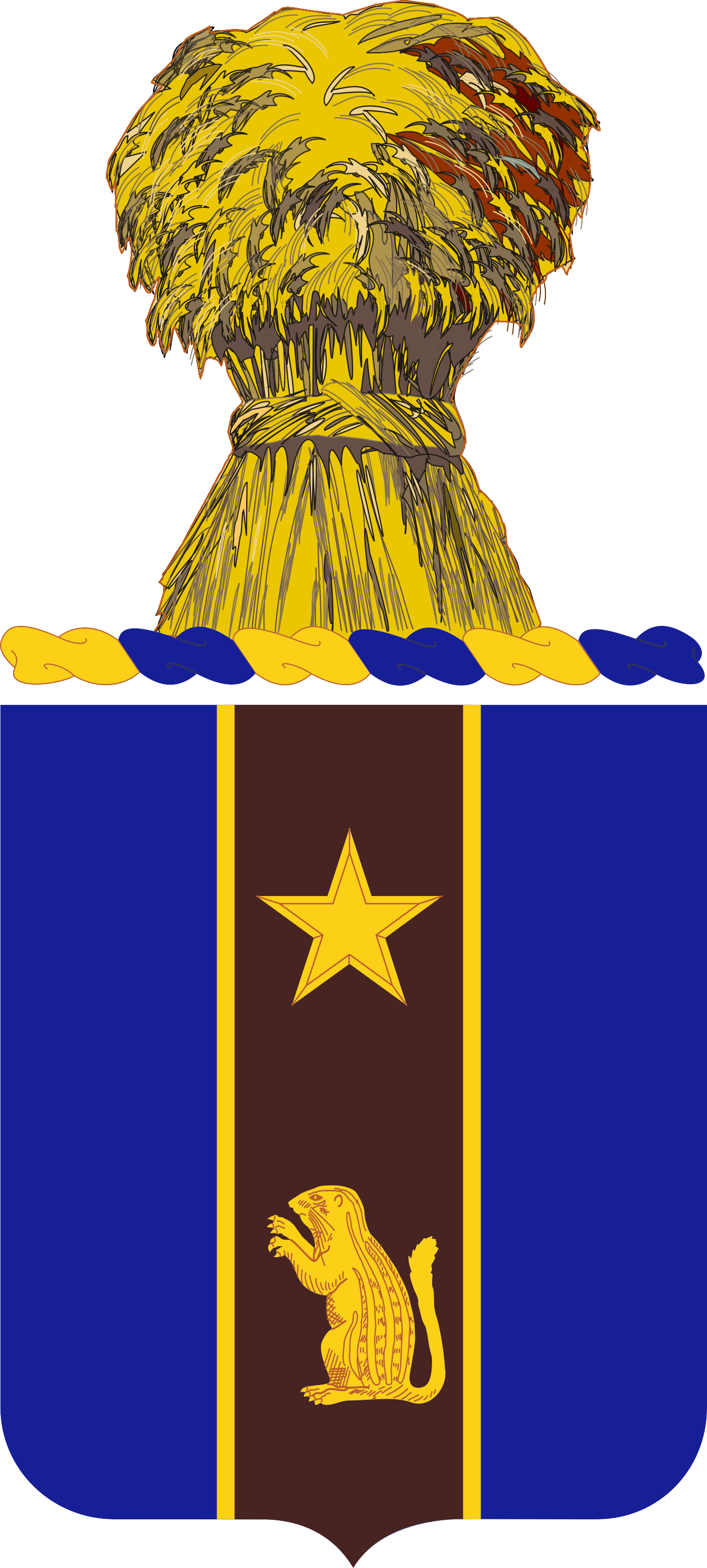
Regiment Coat of Arms of the 205th Infantry Regiment

The United States Army Institute of Heraldry describes the 205th Infantry Regiment's shield in the coat of arms as "Azure, on an augmented pale Sanguine fimbriated Orange in chief a mullet and in base a gopher (Thirteen-lined ground squirrel) sejant both of the last (Orange) crest - The basic color of the shield is blue for Infantry. The pale is maroon edged in gold, the State colors, and on this is charged "L'Étoile du Nord" and the gopher emblem of the State of Minnesota". At the top of the crest is a stook of wheat, representative of the state of Minnesota as part of the grain belt on a torse of the colors Orange and Azure. The coat of arms was approved on 14 October 1925. It was rescinded on 2 October 1958.

The 205th Infantry Regiment's motto is Pour la Patrie, which is French for "For the Fatherland" or "For the Homeland".
