= 136th Infantry Regiment (United States) =

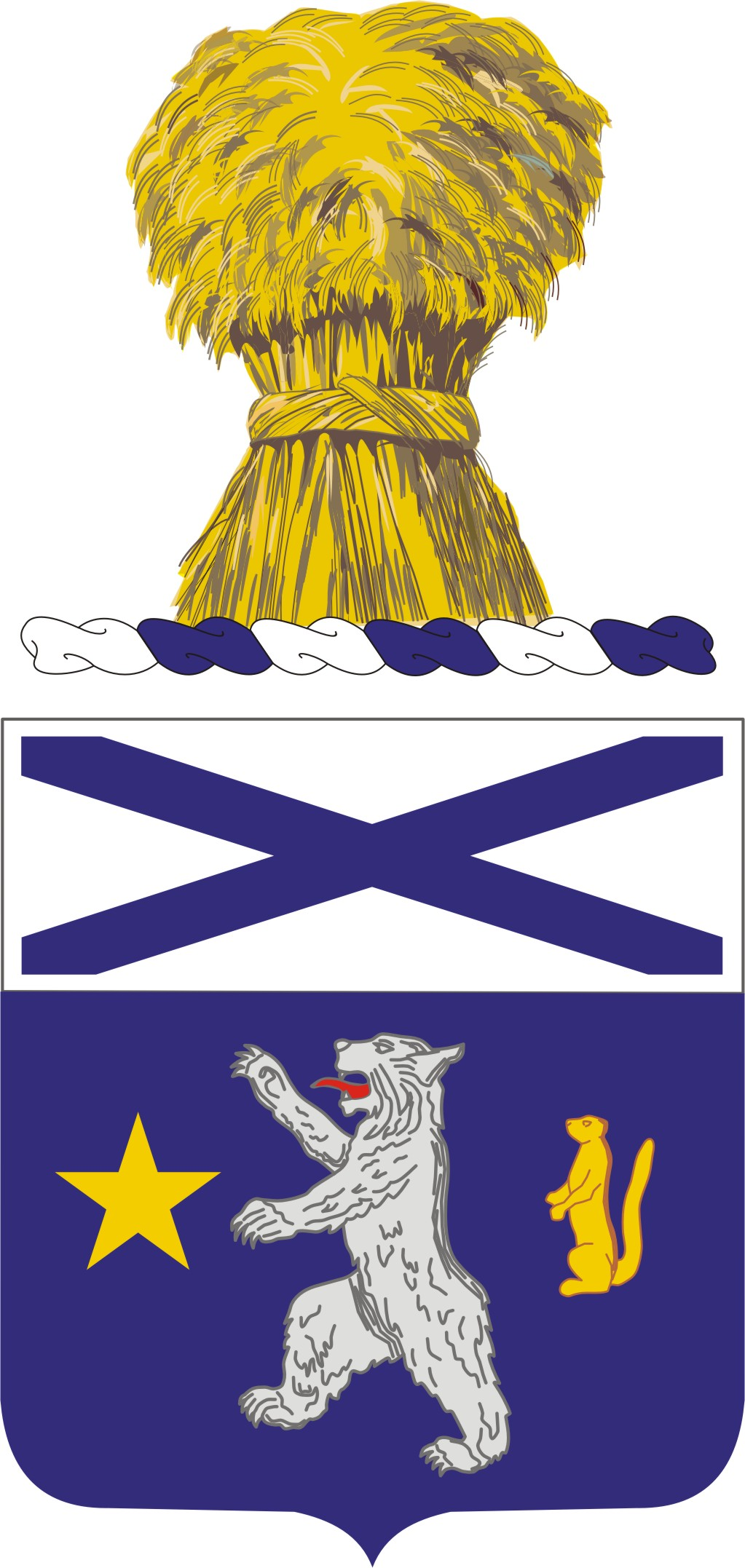
- Coat of arms
- Active: 1861-1919; 1942-1946; 1946-present
- Country: United States
- Branch: Minnesota Army National Guard
- Type: Infantry
- Size: Regiment
- Nickname: Bearcats
- Motto: Rex Montis (King of the Hill)
- Mascot: Bearcats

Commanders
- Current commander: LTC Eric Athman
- Command Sergeant Major: CSM Kyle Jensen

Insignia
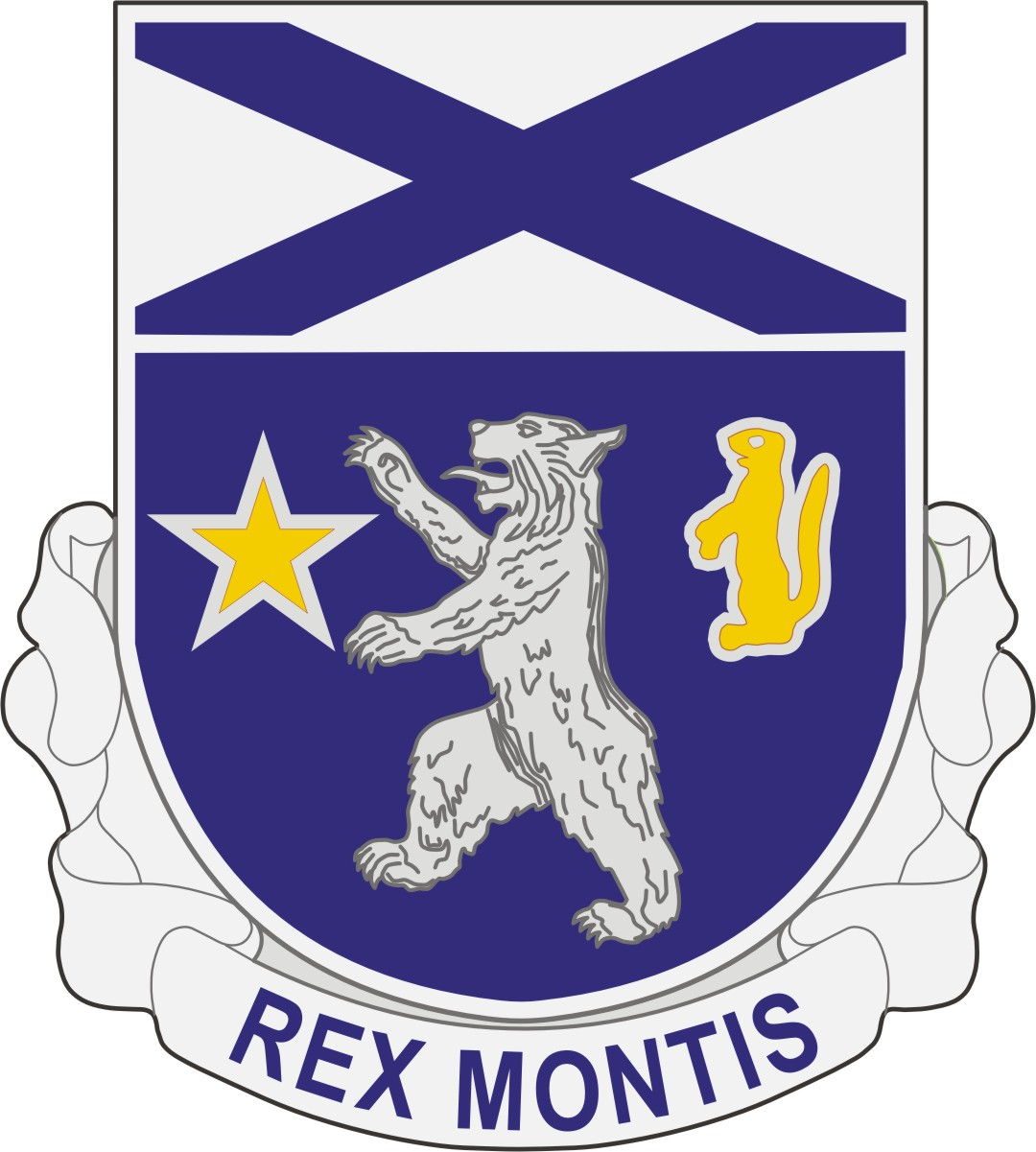
- Distinctive Unit Insignia

The 136th Infantry Regiment is an infantry regiment in the Army National Guard.

== Lineage ==
- Organized 22 July 1861 as 2nd Regiment Minnesota Volunteer Infantry at Fort Snelling, Minnesota. Companies mustered into Federal service 26 June-23 August 1861. Reorganized 29 December 1863. Mustered out of Federal service 10 July 1865 at Louisville, Kentucky.
- (Active or Volunteer element of Minnesota Enrolled Militia redesignated Minnesota National Guard by Act of Legislature 1 March 1871)
- Reorganized as independent companies in the Minnesota National Guard, including Governors Guard organized in 1874 at New Ulm, and Faribault Guards, organized 1876; consolidated in 1880 to form 2nd Battalion, in the Minnesota National Guard.
- Expanded and redesignated 27 February 1883 as 2nd Infantry Regiment, with headquarters at New Ulm.
- Redesignated 4 May 1898 as 12th Infantry Regiment Minnesota Volunteers, and mustered into Federal service 7 May 1898 at St. Paul; mustered out 5 November 1898 at New Ulm.
- Reorganized 3 March 1899 in the Minnesota National Guard as 2nd Infantry Regiment.
- Mustered into Federal service 26 June 1916 at Fort Snelling for Mexican Border duty; mustered out 24 January 1917 at Fort Snelling.
- Called into Federal service 14 July 1917; drafted into Federal service on 5 August 1917.
- Redesignated 136th Infantry Regiment 1 October 1917, and assigned to the 34th Division, at Camp Cody, New Mexico.
- Demobilized 18 February 1919 at Camp Grant (Illinois).
- Reconstituted and activated 1 April 1942 in the Army of the United States as 136th Infantry (organized from infantry personnel of the 33rd Division) and assigned to 33rd Infantry Division.
- Inactivated 5 February 1946 at Otsu, Japan, and relieved from assignment to 33rd Infantry Division.
- Assigned to the 47th Infantry Division 10 June 1946.
- Allotted to Minnesota National Guard 21 June 1946 and consolidated with the 217th Coast Artillery Regiment (see ANNEX) and consolidated unit redesignated as 136th Infantry.
- Reorganized and Federally recognized 23 September 1946, with Headquarters at St. Cloud.
- Ordered into active Federal service 16 January 1951 at St. Cloud.
- (136th Infantry [NGUS] organized and Federally recognized 16 January 1953 with Headquarters at St. Cloud.
- 136th Infantry released from active Federal service and reverted to state control 2 December 1954. Concurrently, Federal recognition withdrawn from 136th Infantry (NGUS).
- Reorganized (less 1st Battalion - separate lineage) 22 February 1959 as the 136th Infantry, a parent regiment under the Combat Arms Regimental System, to consist of the 1st and 2nd Battle Groups, elements of the 47th Infantry Division.
- Reorganized 1 April 1963 to consist of the 1st and 2nd Battalions, 136th Infantry.

ANNEX

- Parent units organized in June and July 1918 in the Minnesota National Guard as the 2nd and 3rd Infantry by consolidation of 1st, 5th, 6th, 11th, and 15th Battalions, Home Guard (organized in 1917 and 1918).
- Redesignated 1 August 1918 as 5th and 6th Infantry and Federally recognized 17 and 30 January 1919, respectively.
- Redesignated 1 December 1923 as 205th and 206th Infantry.
- Converted and reorganized 1 July 1940 in part as 217th Coast Artillery.
- Inducted into Federal service 10 February 1941.
- Reorganized and redesignated 10 September 1943 as follows:
  - Headquarters and Headquarters Battery as Headquarters and Headquarters Battery, 217th Antiaircraft Artillery Group.
  - 1st Battalion as 775th Antiaircraft Artillery Gun Battalion.
  - 2nd Battalion as 257th Antiaircraft Artillery Automatic Weapons Battalion.
  - 3rd Battalion as 344th Antiaircraft Artillery Searchlight Battalion.
- Elements inactivated as follows:
  - 217th Antiaircraft Artillery Group, 24 August 1944, at Camp Bowie, Texas.
  - 775th Antiaircraft Artillery Gun Battalion, 6 May 1944, at Camp Phillips, Kansas.
  - 257th Antiaircraft Artillery Automatic Weapons Battalion, 1 December 1944, at Camp Livingston, Louisiana,
  - 344th Antiaircraft Artillery Searchlight Battalion, 12 June 1944, at Camp Haan, California.
- Converted and consolidated 21 June 1946 with 136th Infantry.

== Distinctive unit insignia ==
- Description

A Silver color and enamel device 1 1/8 inches (2.9 cm) in height overall consisting of a shield blazoned: Azure, a bear cat rampant Argent between in fess a five-pointed mullet and a gopher sejant Or; on a chief of the second a saltire couped of the field. Attached below the shield a Silver scroll inscribed "REX MONTIS" in Blue letters.

- Symbolism

The consolidation of the former 217th Coast Artillery Regiment with the 136th Infantry Regiment is depicted in the design: The bear cat is from the coat of arms of the 136th Infantry Regiment, World War II; the star and gopher are from the coats of arms of the former 205th and 206th Infantry Regiments, predecessors of the 217th Coast Artillery Regiment. The chief, bearing a saltire, is incorporated in this coat of arms to symbolize the Civil War service of the original 136th Infantry Regiment. The shield is blue for Infantry.

- Background

The distinctive unit insignia was approved on 14 November 1951.

== Coat of arms ==
- Blazon
  - Shield: Azure, a bear cat rampant Argent langued Gules between in fess a five-pointed mullet and a gopher sejant Or; on a chief of the second a saltire couped of the field.
  - Crest: That for the regiments and battalions of the Minnesota Army National Guard: On a wreath of the colors (Argent and Azure), a sheaf of wheat Proper.
  - Motto: REX MONTIS (King of the Hill).
- Symbolism
  - Shield: The consolidation of the former 217th Coast Artillery Regiment with the 136th Infantry Regiment is depicted in the design: The bear cat is from the coat of arms of the 136th Infantry Regiment, World War II; the star and gopher are from the coats of arms of the former 205th and 206th Infantry Regiments, predecessors of the 217th Coast Artillery Regiment. The chief, bearing a saltire, is incorporated in this coat of arms to symbolize the Civil War service of the original 136th Infantry Regiment. The shield is blue for Infantry.
  - Crest: The crest is that of the Minnesota Army National Guard.
- Background: The coat of arms was approved on 14 November 1951.

== Campaign streamers ==
Civil War

- Shiloh
- Kentucky 1862
- Tennessee 1862
- Alabama 1862
- Chickmauga
- Chattanooga
- Atlanta
- North Carolina 1865

World War I

- without inscription

World War II

- New Guinea
- Luzon

== Decorations ==
following units entitled to the DUC streamer embroidered LUZON

- A Company
- F Company
- G Company
- I Company

following units entitled to the MUC streamer embroidered ASIATIC-PACIFIC THEATER

- Service Company
- Medical Company
