= 47th Infantry Division (United States) =

Inactive US Army National Guard formation

- Divisional Insignia
- Active: 1946–91
- Country: United States
- Branch: United States Army
- Type: Infantry
- Size: Division
- Nickname: "Viking Division"
- Motto: Furor Vikingorum (Fury of the Vikings)

Commanders
- Notable commanders: Norman E. Hendrickson

Insignia
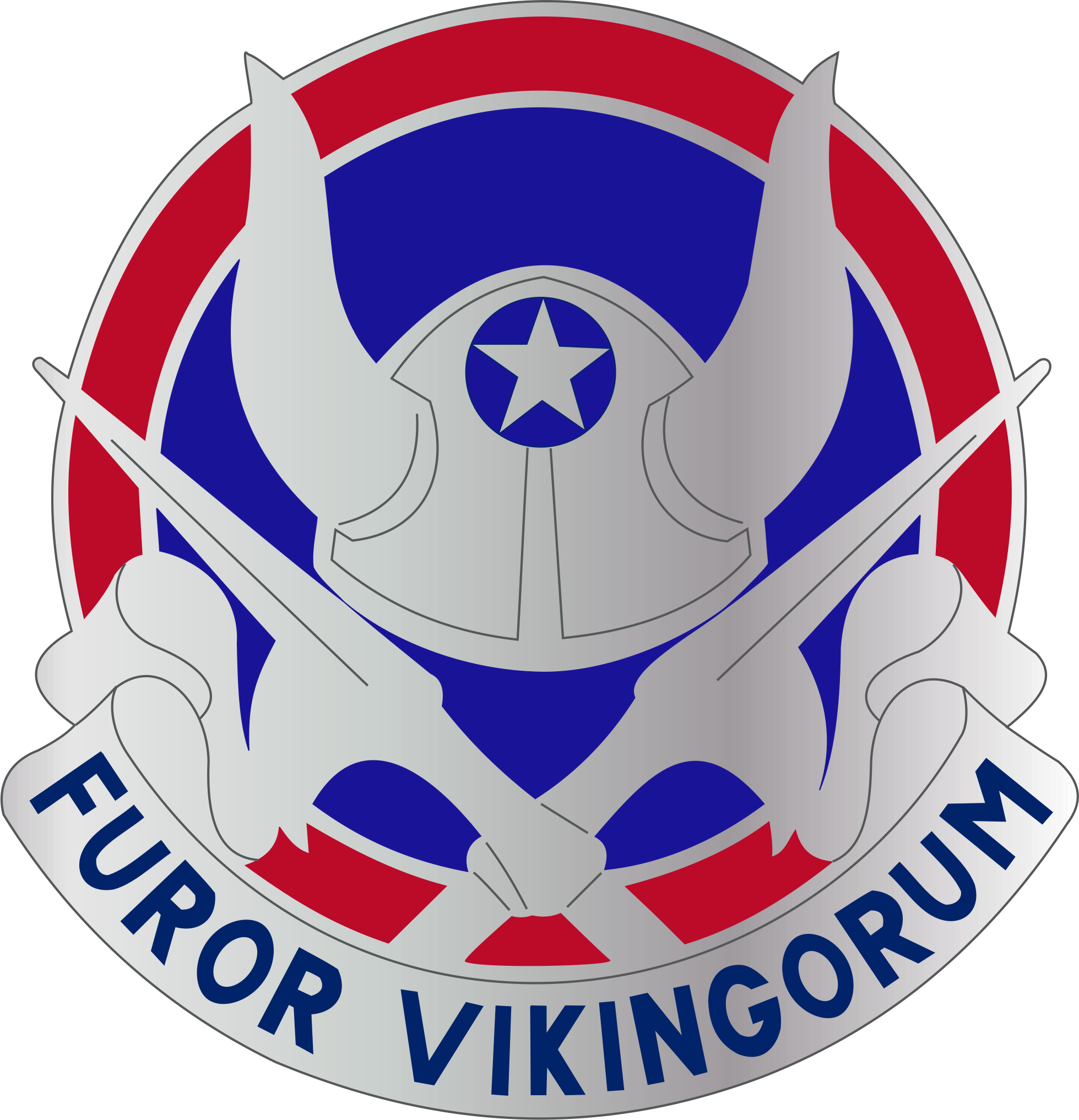
- Distinctive unit insignia

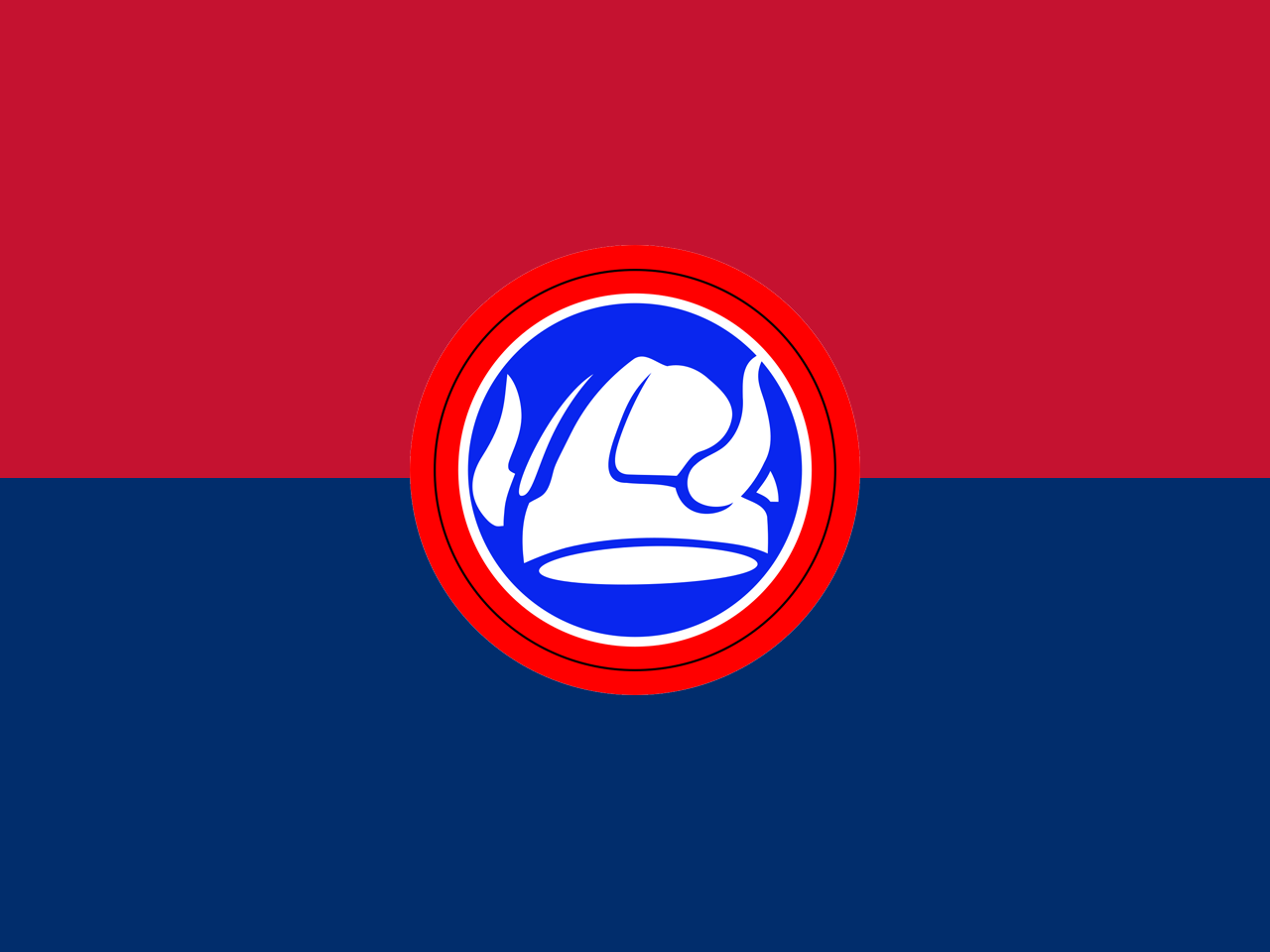
- Flag of the United States Army 47th Infantry Division

The 47th Infantry Division was a formation of the United States Army active from 1946 to 1991. It was provided by the Army National Guard.

== History ==
The division was created on 10 June 1946 as a National Guard infantry division from the efforts of Minnesota's Adjutant General Ellard A. Walsh. The division was built from scratch with veteran transfers and new recruits, mostly from Minnesota and North Dakota, under the command of Major General Norman E. Hendrickson. General Hendrickson was the Chief-of-Staff for the 34th Division in the North African and Italian campaigns in 1943 and the IX Corps in occupied Japan.

Units of the division were allotted to the Minnesota National Guard and North Dakota National Guard. The division never saw combat throughout its history, although its units were first federalized on 15 September 1946 and sent to Camp Rucker, Alabama from 1951 to 1954 during the Korean War. During the Korean War, the division was used as a replacement division, and its men and units transferred to Regular Army units. It returned to state control and its home state in 1953. The unit returned to Minnesota, with active army personnel from Camp Rucker taking a convoy from Fort Benning, Georgia, in 1954.

The 47th was deployed stateside on numerous occasions in response to natural disasters and civil disturbances. From 24 April to 25 May 1950, Vikings were deployed to Crookston and East Grand Forks, Minnesota, in response to flooding in the Red River valley. Significant training opportunities included participation in the Operation Longhorn exercise in Texas and an atomic bomb test in Nevada by Company C, 135th Infantry.

The division's North Dakota elements were transferred out in 1959 during the service-wide reconfiguration to the five-sided Pentomic structure. Infantry regiments were dropped and replaced by battle groups bearing the regimental number (1st Battle Group, 135th Infantry, for example) as well as numerous other redesignations and reconfigurations. It became an entirely Minnesotan division. The division was again reorganized in 1963, this time according to the Reorganization Objective Army Division (ROAD) structure. Battle group designations were dropped and substituted by battalions assigned flexibly to brigades. Several other significant redesignations and changes were also made.

On 22 February 1959, 2nd Battalion, 136th Infantry, was converted and redesignated as the 2nd Reconnaissance Squadron of the 194th Armor, part of the 47th Division. It became the 194th Armor's 2nd Battalion on 1 April 1963.

A previous AA battery was reorganized and federally recognized 26 November 1947 at St. Paul as Battery D, 256th Antiaircraft Artillery Automatic Weapons Battalion, an element of the 47th Infantry Division. It then became the 47th Aviation Company (Dzwonchyk, "Aviation," 79). On 1 April 1963, the 47th Aviation Company of the 47th Infantry Division was reorganized and redesignated as the Headquarters Company, 47th Aviation Battalion, an element of the 47th Infantry Division. It was reorganized and redesignated on 1 January 1965 as the Headquarters Detachment, 47th Aviation Battalion. It was reorganized and redesignated 1 June 1971 as Headquarters Company, 47th Aviation Battalion. Company A was allotted 1 February 1968 to the Illinois Army National Guard; redesignated 30 September 1978 as Company C and Companies A and E allotted to the Minnesota Army National Guard, Company B allotted to the Iowa Army National Guard, and Company D allotted to the Wisconsin Army National Guard (Dzwonchyk, "Aviation," 79).

The 194th Armor was reorganized as a parent regiment under the Combat Arms Regimental System on 1 February 1968, consisting of the 2nd Battalion, still part of the 47th Division.

The most sweeping reorganization occurred in February 1968. Principal among them was the extension of the division into Iowa and Illinois as a result of Department of Defense-mandated cutbacks of the Guard in those states. Iowa's 67th Brigade was disbanded, redesignated as the 34th Infantry Brigade, and assigned to the 47th Division. In Illinois, units of the disbanded 33rd Infantry Division were reorganized into the 66th Infantry Brigade and made part of the 47th Division.

In December 1965, the division became one of three National Guard divisions earmarked for the Selected Reserve Force, capable of more rapid deployment. This status was removed on 1 February 1968.

The division was deactivated in 1991. Immediately afterward, the division's former units were reactivated, "reflagged," as the 34th Infantry Division. "With the exception of the name and number change, everything else — the mission, organization and personnel — would remain the same." Effectively, the division was renamed, but for historical purposes, the Department of the Army does not recognize any continuity between the lineage of the headquarters of the 47th Infantry Division and the second activation of the headquarters of the 34th Infantry Division, continuing the latter division’s lineage through the 34th Infantry Brigade.

The 47th Infantry Division remained on the rolls longer than any other National Guard division that did not see combat (45 years of service). The only Army division that did not see combat to have remained on the rolls longer is the Army Reserve's 108th Infantry Division, elements of which have seen action now in Iraq and Afghanistan.

== Leaders ==
Commanders

- MG Norman E. Hendrickson, (1946 – 20 January 1954)
- BG Philip C. Bettenburg, (25 January 1954 – 31 January 1958)
- MG Richard Cook, (1 February 1958 – 14 January 1960)
- MG Robert P. Miller, (15 January 1960 – 6 October 1963)
- MG Donald C. Grant, (7 October 1963 – 31 March 1971)
- MG Paul V. Meyer, (1 April 1971 – 27 September 1973)
- MG William S. Lundberg Jr., (28 September 1973 – 30 January 1976)
- MG James S. O'Brien, (1 July 1976 – 23 June 1979)
- MG Robert G. Walker, (24 June 1979 – 31 October 1982)
- BG Edward W. Waldon, (1 November 1982 – 8 December 1985)
- BG Allan R. Meixner, (9 December 1985 – 20 September 1986)
- MG Robert L. Blevins, (21 September 1986 – 31 October 1988)
- MG David H. Lueck, (1 November 1988 – 10 February 1991)

Command Sergeants Major

- CSM Leroy A. Spangerud, 1966 – 1982
- CSM Richard P. Cich, 1982 – 1986
- CSM Joseph M. Van Lith, 1986 – 1988
