= 194th Armor Regiment =

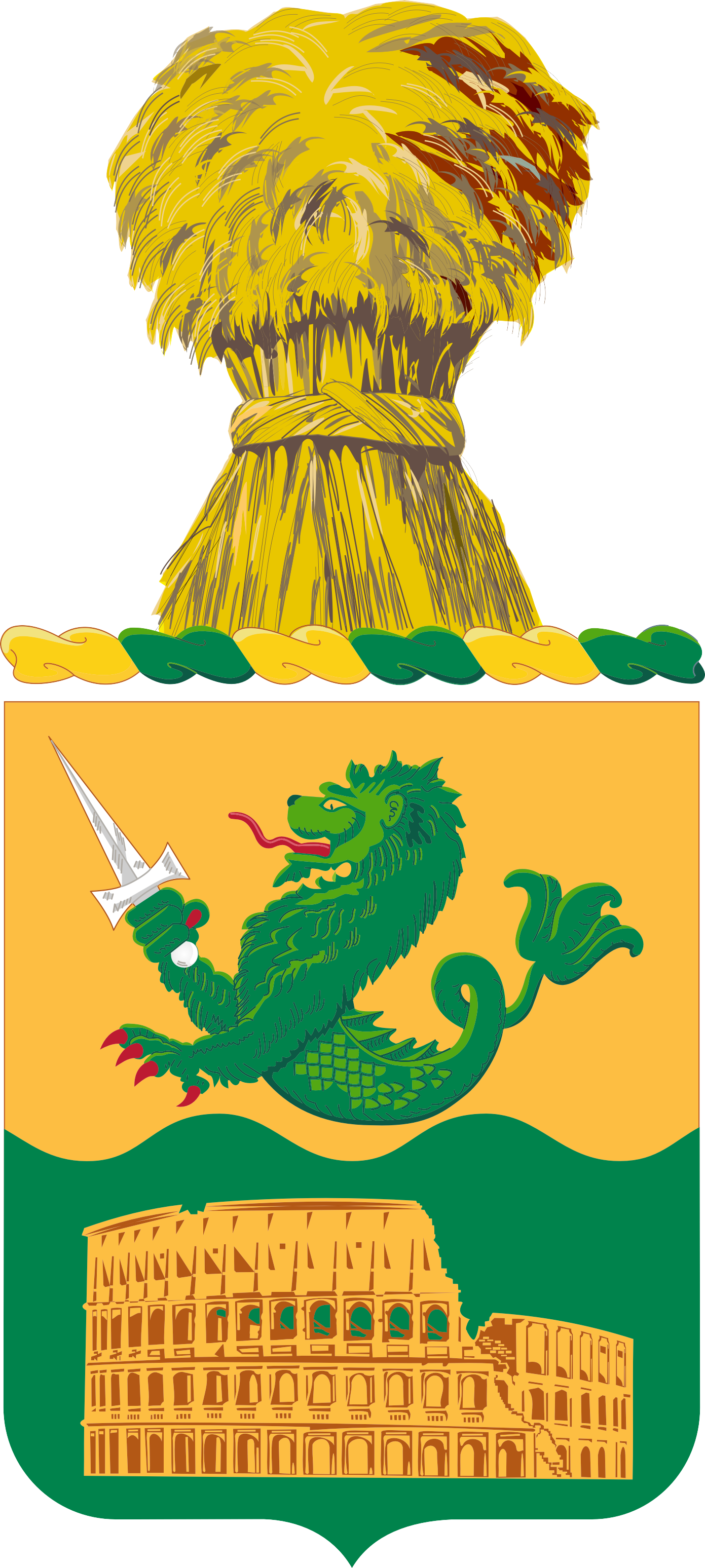
- Coat of Arms
- Active: 1959 – present
- Country: United States
- Branch: United States Army
- Type: Armor
- Motto: The Arm of Decision
- Engagements: World War 2; Attack on Clark Field (1941); Battle of Bataan (1942); Bataan Death March (1942); Iraq War; Operation Iraqi Freedom (2005-2007); Operation New Dawn (2011); Operation Inherent Resolve (2021); Operation Spartan Shield (2021); War in Afghanistan; Operation Allies Refuge (2021)

Insignia
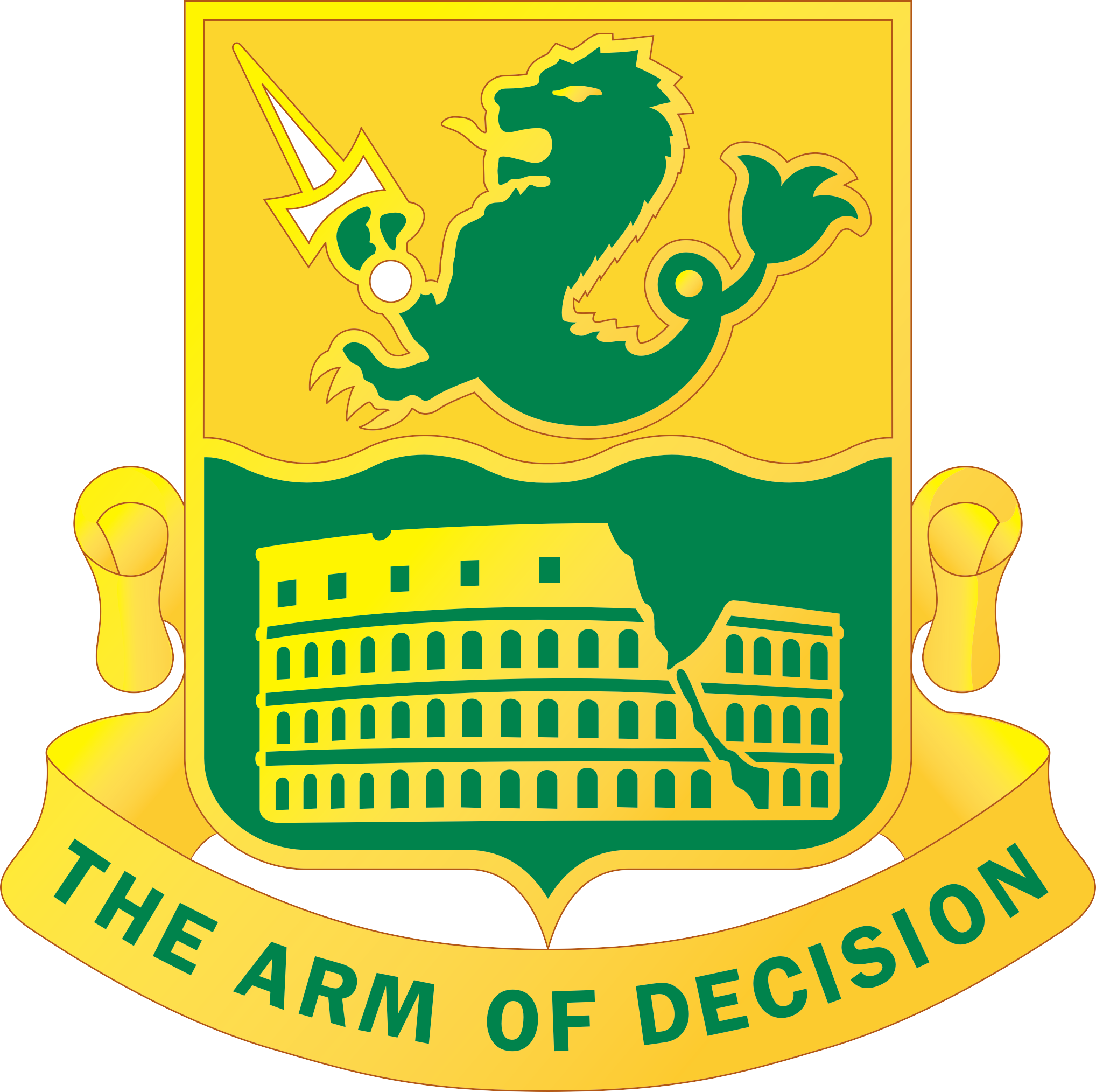
- Distinctive unit insignia

The 194th Armor Regiment is an armored regiment of the Minnesota National Guard. The sole combat element of the regiment is 1st Combined Arms Battalion, a unit of the 34th Infantry Division of the United States Army.

== Traditions ==
The 194th Armor Regiment traces its lineage back to the 194th Tank Battalion that saw service in the Pacific Theater of World War II. as well as the 194th Heavy Tank Battalion of the postwar Minnesota National Guard.

In February 1941 Brainerd's 34th tank company was made A Co. of the 194th. It was at the Battle of Bataan. The men would make the Bataan Death March, 29 died as prisoners of war.

== Postwar ==
On 22 February 1959, the regiment was created on the basis of the 194th Tank Battalion and the 1st Battalion, 136th Infantry Regiment. The designation, unit type, and subordination of the battalions of the regiment has changed several times since the creation of the regiment.

- 1st Medium Tank Battalion, 194th Armor, February 1959 to April 1963, part of the 47th Infantry Division.
- 1st Battalion, 194th Armor, April 1963 to February 1968, part of the 47th Infantry Division.
- 1st Squadron, 194th Cavalry, February 1968 to February 1991, part of the 47th Infantry Division.
- 1st Squadron, 194th Cavalry, February 1991 to September 1992, part of the 34th Infantry Division.
- 1st Battalion, 194th Infantry, September 1992 to October 2000, part of the 34th Infantry Division.
- 1st Battalion, 194th Armor, October 2000 - October 2006, part of the 34th Infantry Division.
- 1st Combined Arms Battalion, 194th Armor, October 2006 – Present, part of the 34th Infantry Division.

1-194 Armor has served overseas in Bosnia, Kosovo, Honduras, Kuwait, Iraq, and Afghanistan.

The second battalion of the regiment had the following assignments.

- 2nd Reconnaissance Squadron, 194th Armor, February 1959 to April 1963, part of the 47th Infantry Division.
- 2nd Battalion, 194th Armor, April 1963 until January 1972, part of the 47th Infantry Division.
- 2nd Armored Reconnaissance Squadron, 194th Armor, September 2002 to 2009, part of the 34th Infantry Division.

1st Battalion served on the Kabul Airport perimeter line during the 2021 evacuation from Afghanistan alongside a number of active duty units, having been pulled forward from Operation Spartan Shield.

== Sources ==
- Timothy Aumiller, United States Army Infantry, Armor/Cavalry, Artillery Battalions 1957-2011, Takoma Park: Tiger Lily Publications, 2008. ISBN 978-0-9776072-3-5.
- Mary L. Stubbs and Stanley R. Connor, Army Lineage Series Armor-Cavalry Part II: Army National Guard, Washington D.C.: GPO, 1972.
