= Iowa Army National Guard =

Component of the US Army and military of the state of Iowa

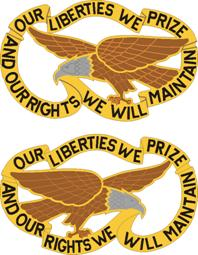
- Iowa Army National Guard Headquarters DUI
- Country: United States
- Allegiance: Iowa
- Branch: United States Army National Guard
- Type: ARNG Headquarters Command
- Part of: Iowa National Guard
- Garrison/HQ: Johnston, Iowa

Insignia
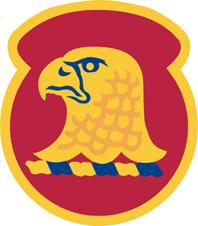
- Iowa ARNG Headquarters SSI

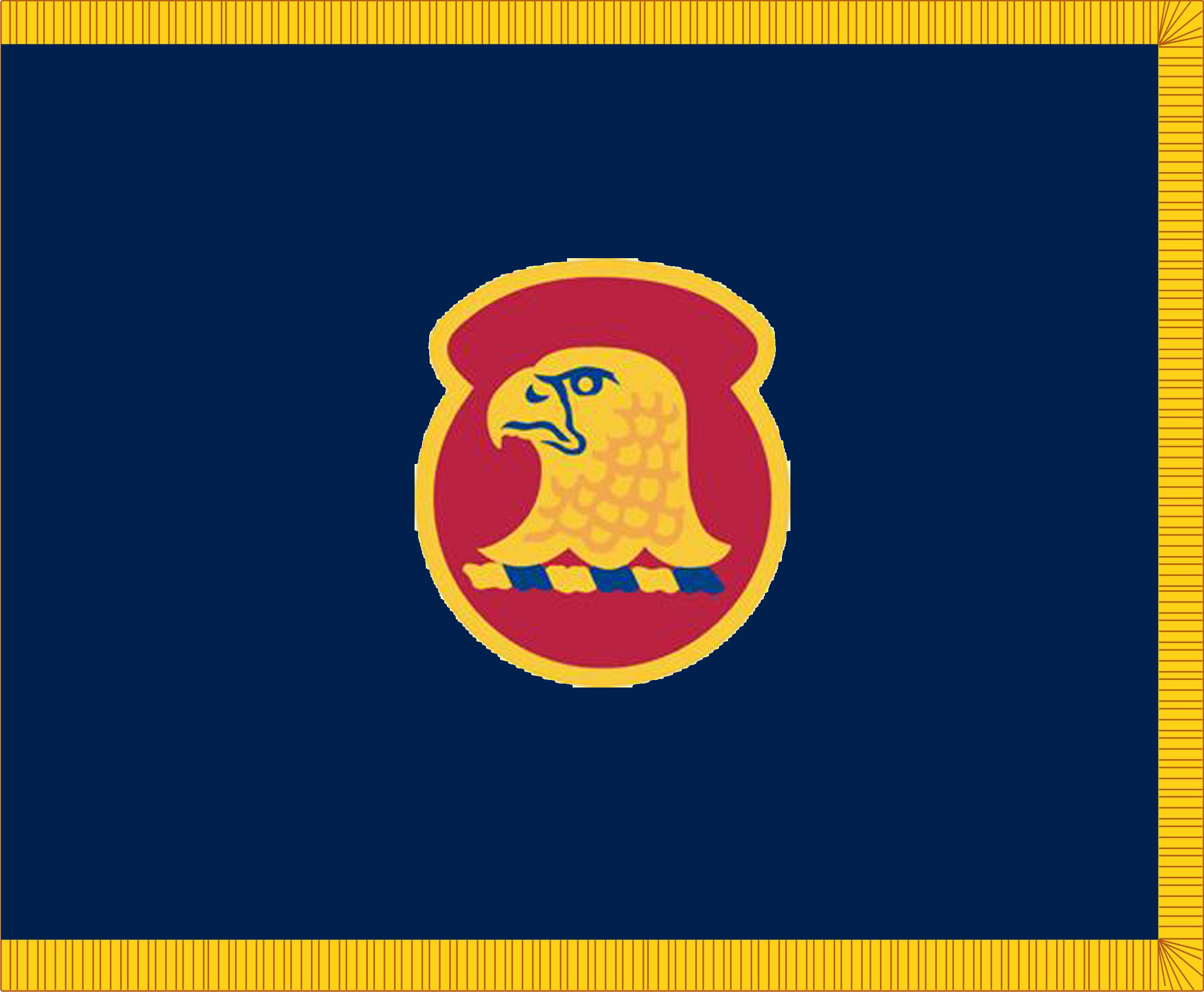
- Iowa ARNG Headquarters Flag

- Iowa Army National Guard Crest

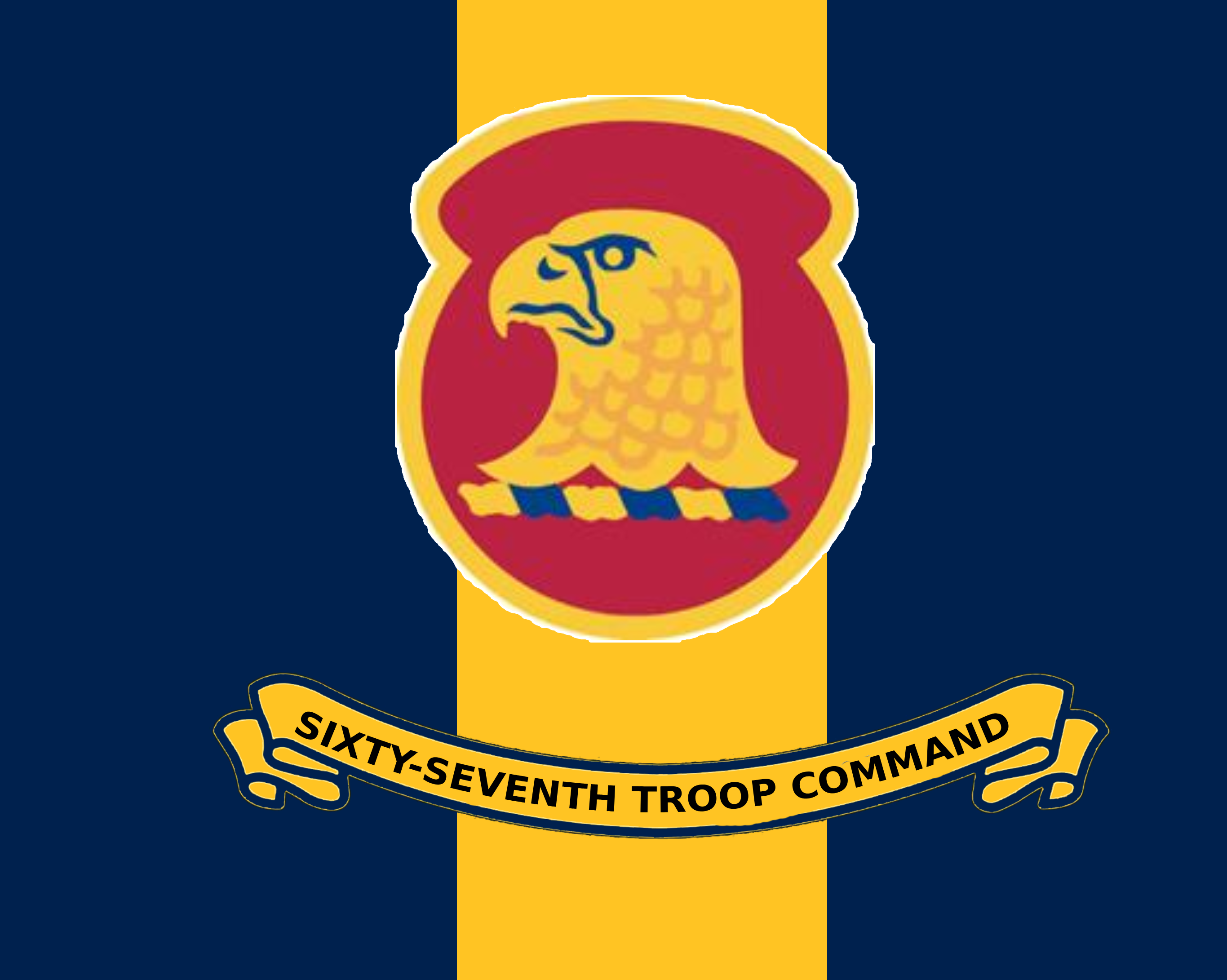
- Iowa Army National Guard 67th Troop Command Flag

The Iowa Army National Guard is a state agency of the State of Iowa, with significant funding from the Federal Government of the United States; and a reserve component of the United States Army. It has dual Federal and State missions. It is empowered to function under control of the governor, as a State asset in times of emergency or natural disaster, or if needed to carry out limited actions during non-emergency situations to include full scale Enforcement of martial law, when local law enforcement officials can no longer maintain civil control. The National Guard may also be called into federal service in response to a call by the president or Congress.

Iowa National Guard units are trained and equipped as part of the United States National Guard. The same enlisted ranks, officer ranks and insignia are used. National Guardsmen are eligible to receive all United States military awards. The Iowa National Guard also bestows a number of state awards for local services rendered in or to the state of Iowa.

== History ==
The Iowa Army National Guard traces its origins to 1838. The Militia Act of 1903 organized the various state militias into the present National Guard system.

The 133d Infantry Regiment, formerly the 2nd Iowa Volunteer Infantry, served as part of the 67th Infantry Brigade, 34th Division, during World War I. The 67th Infantry Brigade was disbanded in February 1919, but formed again in 1921, still as part of the 34th Division. From 1921 to 1942, it was part of the Guard in Iowa, comprising the 168th Infantry Regiment. Approximately 50 Iowa ARNG soldiers deployed to Iraq with the Combat Aviation Brigade, 36th Infantry Division (Task Force Mustang) in September 2006.

Notable members of the Iowa Army Guard included:

- Rudolph Martin Anderson
- Joni Ernst

Units of the Iowa Army National Guard formed since 1917 include:

- 113th Armor Regiment
- 133d Infantry Regiment – formerly the 2nd Iowa Volunteer Infantry, created and assigned to the 34th Division on 1 October 1917
- 168th Infantry Regiment
- 185th Field Artillery Regiment
- 194th Field Artillery Regiment
- 185th Support Battalion
- 334th Support Battalion
- 1034th Support Battalion
- 224th Engineer Battalion
- 734th Maintenance Battalion
- 109th Aviation Regiment

== Units in 2026 ==
As of February 2026 the Iowa Army National Guard consists of the following units:

- Joint Force Headquarters-Iowa, Army Element, at Camp Dodge
  - Headquarters and Headquarters Detachment, Joint Force Headquarters-Iowa, Army Element, at Camp Dodge
  - Iowa Medical Detachment, at Camp Dodge
  - Camp Dodge Training Center, in Johnston
  - Army Aviation Support Facility #1, at Boone Airport
  - Army Aviation Support Facility #2, at Waterloo Airport
  - Army Aviation Support Facility #3, at Davenport Airport
  - Combined Support Maintenance Shop #1, at Camp Dodge
  - Unit Training Equipment Site #1, at Camp Dodge
  - Field Maintenance Shop #1, in Boone
  - Field Maintenance Shop #2, in Waterloo
  - Field Maintenance Shop #3, in Sioux City
  - Field Maintenance Shop #4, in Council Bluffs
  - Field Maintenance Shop #5, in Mason City
  - Field Maintenance Shop #8, in Red Oak
  - Field Maintenance Shop #11, in Fort Dodge
  - Field Maintenance Shop #12, in Fairfield
  - Field Maintenance Shop #13, in Cedar Rapids
  - Field Maintenance Shop #15, in Middletown
  - 2nd Infantry Brigade Combat Team, 34th Infantry Division, in Boone
    - Headquarters and Headquarters Company, 2nd Infantry Brigade Combat Team, 34th Infantry Division, in Boone
    - 1st Squadron, 113th Cavalry Regiment, in Sioux City
      - Headquarters and Headquarters Troop, 1st Squadron, 113th Cavalry Regiment, in Sioux City
      - Troop A, 1st Squadron, 113th Cavalry Regiment, at Camp Dodge
      - Troop B, 1st Squadron, 113th Cavalry Regiment, at Camp Dodge
      - Troop C (Dismounted), 1st Squadron, 113th Cavalry Regiment, in Le Mars
    - 1st Battalion, 133rd Infantry Regiment, in Waterloo
      - Headquarters and Headquarters Company, 1st Battalion, 133rd Infantry Regiment, in Waterloo
      - Company A, 1st Battalion, 133rd Infantry Regiment, in Dubuque
      - Company B, 1st Battalion, 133rd Infantry Regiment, in Iowa City
      - Company C, 1st Battalion, 133rd Infantry Regiment, in Iowa Falls
        - Detachment 1, Company C, 1st Battalion, 133rd Infantry Regiment, in Oelwein
      - Company D (Weapons), 1st Battalion, 133rd Infantry Regiment, in Davenport
    - 2nd Battalion, 135th Infantry Regiment, in Mankato (MN) — (Minnesota Army National Guard)
    - 1st Battalion, 168th Infantry Regiment, in Council Bluffs
      - Headquarters and Headquarters Company, 1st Battalion, 168th Infantry Regiment, in Council Bluffs
      - Company A, 1st Battalion, 168th Infantry Regiment, in Carroll
        - Detachment 1, Company A, 1st Battalion, 168th Infantry Regiment, in Denison
      - Company B, 1st Battalion, 168th Infantry Regiment, in Shenandoah
        - Detachment 1, Company B, 1st Battalion, 168th Infantry Regiment, at Camp Dodge
      - Company C, 1st Battalion, 168th Infantry Regiment, at Camp Dodge
      - Company D (Weapons), 1st Battalion, 168th Infantry Regiment, in Council Bluffs
    - 1st Battalion, 194th Field Artillery Regiment, in Fort Dodge
      - Headquarters and Headquarters Battery, 1st Battalion, 194th Field Artillery Regiment, in Fort Dodge
        - Detachment 1, Headquarters and Headquarters Battery, 1st Battalion, 194th Field Artillery Regiment, in Spencer
        - Detachment 2, Headquarters and Headquarters Battery, 1st Battalion, 194th Field Artillery Regiment, in Charles City
        - Detachment 3, Headquarters and Headquarters Battery, 1st Battalion, 194th Field Artillery Regiment, in Owatonna (MN) — (Minnesota Army National Guard)
        - Detachment 4, Headquarters and Headquarters Battery, 1st Battalion, 194th Field Artillery Regiment, at Camp Dodge
      - Battery A, 1st Battalion, 194th Field Artillery Regiment, in Spencer
      - Battery B, 1st Battalion, 194th Field Artillery Regiment, at Camp Dodge
        - Detachment 1, Battery B, 1st Battalion, 194th Field Artillery Regiment, in Dubuque
      - Battery C, 1st Battalion, 194th Field Artillery Regiment, at Camp Dodge
    - 224th Brigade Engineer Battalion, in Davenport
      - Headquarters and Headquarters Company, 224th Brigade Engineer Battalion, in Davenport
      - Company A (Combat Engineer), 224th Brigade Engineer Battalion, in Mount Pleasant
      - Company B (Combat Engineer), 224th Brigade Engineer Battalion, in Davenport
      - Company C (Signal), 224th Brigade Engineer Battalion, in Cedar Rapids
      - Company D (Military Intelligence), 224th Brigade Engineer Battalion, at Camp Dodge
        - Detachment 1, Company D (Military Intelligence), 224th Brigade Engineer Battalion, at Boone Municipal Airport (RQ-28A UAV)
    - 334th Brigade Support Battalion, in Cedar Rapids
      - Headquarters and Headquarters Company, 334th Brigade Support Battalion, in Cedar Rapids
      - Company A (Distribution), 334th Brigade Support Battalion, in Cedar Rapids
      - Company B (Maintenance), 334th Brigade Support Battalion, in Cedar Rapids
      - Company C (Medical), 334th Brigade Support Battalion, at Camp Dodge
      - Company D (Forward Support), 334th Brigade Support Battalion, in Sioux City — attached to 1st Squadron, 113th Cavalry Regiment
      - Company E (Forward Support), 334th Brigade Support Battalion, in Davenport — attached to 224th Brigade Engineer Battalion
        - Detachment 1, Company E (Forward Support), 334th Brigade Support Battalion, in Mount Pleasant
      - Company F (Forward Support), 334th Brigade Support Battalion, in Storm Lake — attached to 1st Battalion, 194th Field Artillery Regiment
      - Company G (Forward Support), 334th Brigade Support Battalion, in Waterloo — attached to 1st Battalion, 133rd Infantry Regiment
      - Company H (Forward Support), 334th Brigade Support Battalion, in Red Oak — attached to 1st Battalion, 168th Infantry Regiment
      - Company I (Forward Support), 334th Brigade Support Battalion, in Arden Hills (MN) — attached to 2nd Battalion, 135th Infantry Regiment (Minnesota Army National Guard)
  - 67th Troop Command, in Iowa City
    - Headquarters and Headquarters Company, 67th Troop Command, in Iowa City
    - 34th Army Band, in Fairfield
    - 109th Medical Battalion (Multifunctional), in Iowa City
      - Headquarters and Headquarters Detachment, 109th Medical Battalion (Multifunctional), in Iowa City
      - 134th Medical Company (Ground Ambulance), at Camp Dodge
      - 209th Medical Company (Area Support), in Iowa City
      - 294th Medical Company (Area Support), in Washington
    - 248th Aviation Support Battalion, at Boone Airport
      - Headquarters Support Company, 248th Aviation Support Battalion, at Boone Airport
        - Detachment 1, Headquarters Support Company, 248th Aviation Support Battalion, at Davenport Airport
        - Detachment 2, Headquarters Support Company, 248th Aviation Support Battalion, at Waterloo Airport
      - Company A (Distribution), 248th Aviation Support Battalion, at Waterloo Airport
        - Detachment 1, Company A (Distribution), 248th Aviation Support Battalion, in Clinton
        - Detachment 2, Company A (Distribution), 248th Aviation Support Battalion, in Muscatine
      - Company B (AVIM), 248th Aviation Support Battalion, at Boone Airport
        - Detachment 1, Company B (AVIM), 248th Aviation Support Battalion, at West Bend Airport (WI) — (Wisconsin Army National Guard)
        - Detachment 2, Company B (AVIM), 248th Aviation Support Battalion, at Richmond Airport (VA) — (Virginia Army National Guard)
        - Detachment 3, Company B (AVIM), 248th Aviation Support Battalion, at Waterloo Airport
        - Detachment 4, Company B (AVIM), 248th Aviation Support Battalion, at Davenport Airport
        - Detachment 5, Company B (AVIM), 248th Aviation Support Battalion, at Wheeling Ohio County Airport (WV) — (West Virginia Army National Guard)
      - Company C (Signal), 248th Aviation Support Battalion, in Lexington Park (MD) — (Maryland Army National Guard)
      - Company B (Heavy Lift), 1st Battalion (General Support Aviation), 171st Aviation Regiment, at Davenport Airport (CH-47F Chinook)
        - Detachment 1, Headquarters and Headquarters Company, 1st Battalion (General Support Aviation), 171st Aviation Regiment, at Davenport Airport
        - Detachment 1, Company D (AVUM), 1st Battalion (General Support Aviation), 171st Aviation Regiment, at Davenport Airport
        - Detachment 1, Company E (Forward Support), 1st Battalion (General Support Aviation), 171st Aviation Regiment, at Davenport Airport
      - Company C, 2nd Battalion (Assault), 147th Aviation Regiment, at Boone Airport (UH-60M Black Hawk)
        - Detachment 2, Headquarters and Headquarters Company, 2nd Battalion (Assault), 147th Aviation Regiment, at Boone Airport
        - Detachment 2, Company D (AVUM), 2nd Battalion (Assault), 147th Aviation Regiment, at Boone Airport
        - Detachment 2, Company E (Forward Support), 2nd Battalion (Assault), 147th Aviation Regiment, at Boone Airport
      - Detachment 1, Company C (MEDEVAC), 2nd Battalion (General Support Aviation), 211th Aviation Regiment, at Waterloo Airport (HH-60L Black Hawk)
        - Detachment 3, Headquarters and Headquarters Company, 2nd Battalion (General Support Aviation), 211th Aviation Regiment, at Waterloo Airport
        - Detachment 3, Company D (AVUM), 2nd Battalion (General Support Aviation), 211th Aviation Regiment, at Waterloo Airport
        - Detachment 3, Company E (Forward Support), 2nd Battalion (General Support Aviation), 211th Aviation Regiment, at Waterloo Airport
      - Detachment 1, Company A, 1st Battalion (Security & Support), 376th Aviation Regiment, at Waterloo Airport (UH-72A Lakota)
      - Detachment 6, Company B, 2nd Battalion (Fixed Wing), 641st Aviation Regiment (Detachment 34, Operational Support Airlift Activity), at Des Moines Airport (C-12 Huron)
  - 671st Troop Command, at Camp Dodge
    - Headquarters and Headquarters Company, 671st Troop Command, at Camp Dodge
    - 71st Civil Support Team (WMD), at Camp Dodge
    - 135th Mobile Public Affairs Detachment, at Camp Dodge
    - 233th Judge Advocate General Detachment, at Camp Dodge
    - 908th Quartermaster Platoon (Field Feeding), in Middletown
    - Iowa Recruiting & Retention Battalion, at Camp Dodge
      - Company A, Iowa Recruiting & Retention Battalion, at Camp Dodge
      - Company B, Iowa Recruiting & Retention Battalion, in Waterloo
      - Company C, Iowa Recruiting & Retention Battalion, in Iowa City
      - Company D, Iowa Recruiting & Retention Battalion, in Council Bluffs
      - Company E, Iowa Recruiting & Retention Battalion, in Storm Lake
      - Company F, Iowa Recruiting & Retention Battalion, in Davenport
  - 734th Regional Support Group, at Camp Dodge
    - Headquarters and Headquarters Company, 734th Regional Support Group, at Camp Dodge
    - 185th Combat Sustainment Support Battalion, at Camp Dodge
      - Headquarters and Headquarters Company, 185th Combat Sustainment Support Battalion, at Camp Dodge
      - Company A (Composite Supply Company), 1347th Division Sustainment Support Battalion, in Fairfield (part of 34th Division Sustainment Brigade)
        - Detachment 1, Company A, 1347th Division Sustainment Support Battalion, in Dubuque
        - Detachment 2, Company A, 1347th Division Sustainment Support Battalion, in Clinton
      - Company B (Support Maintenance Company), 1347th Division Sustainment Support Battalion, in Knoxville (part of 34th Division Sustainment Brigade)
        - Detachment 1, Company B, 1347th Division Sustainment Support Battalion, in Oskaloosa
      - 831st Engineer Company (Engineer Construction Company), in Middletown
      - 833rd Engineer Company (Sapper), in Ottumwa
      - 1133rd Transportation Company (Medium Truck) (Cargo), in Mason City
    - 1034th Combat Sustainment Support Battalion, at Camp Dodge
      - Headquarters and Headquarters Company, 1034th Combat Sustainment Support Battalion, at Camp Dodge
      - 186th Military Police Company (Combat Support), at Camp Dodge
      - 1168th Transportation Company (Medium Truck) (Cargo), in Perry
        - Detachment 1, 1168th Transportation Company (Medium Truck) (Cargo), in Audubon
        - Detachment 2, 1168th Transportation Company (Medium Truck) (Cargo), in Marshalltown
      - 2168th Transportation Company (Medium Truck) (Cargo), in Sheldon
      - 3655th Ordnance Company (Classification and Inspection Company), at Camp Dodge
  - 185th Regiment, Regional Training Institute, at Camp Dodge
    - Regional Training Site-Maintenance, at Camp Dodge

Aviation unit abbreviations: MEDEVAC — Medical evacuation; AVUM — Aviation Unit Maintenance; AVIM — Aviation Intermediate Maintenance

== See also ==
- Iowa State Guard
