= Iowa Cow War =

1931 dispute in Iowa over testing cows for bovine tuberculosis

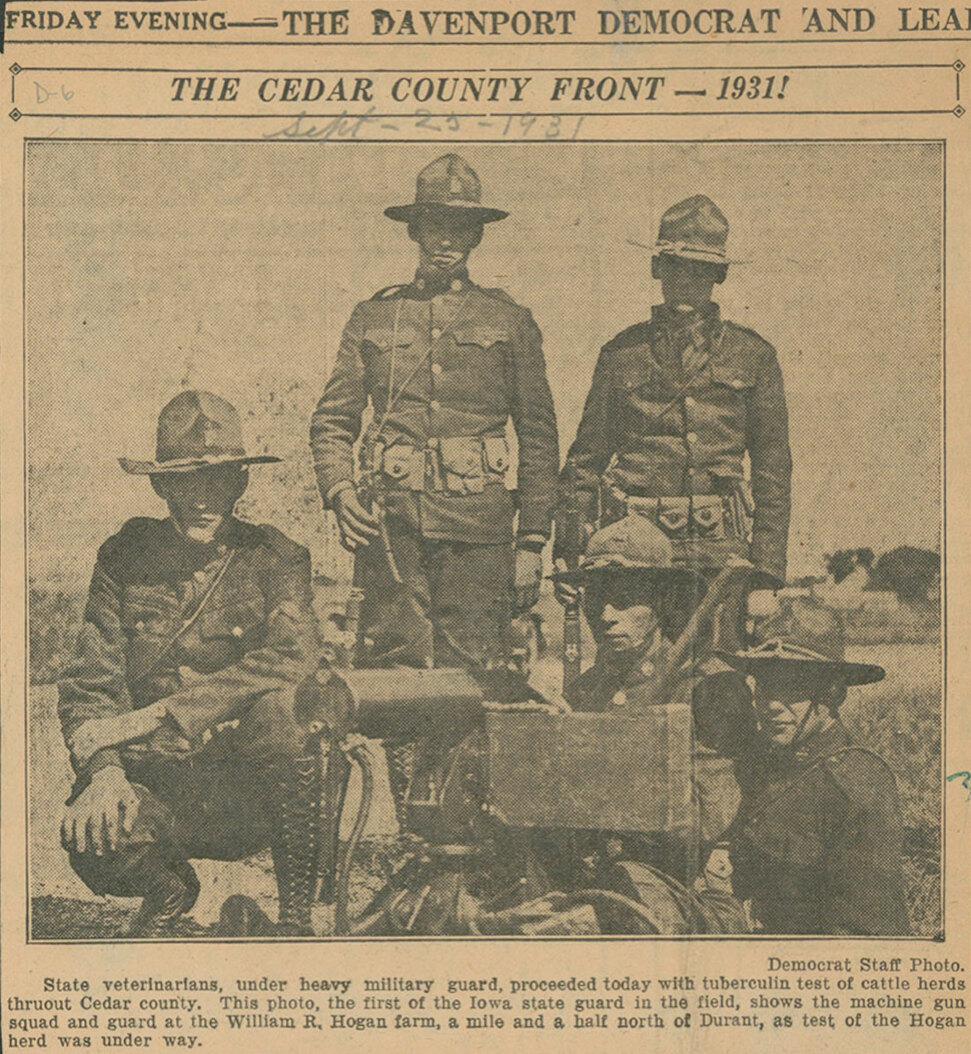
- Iowa National Guard members on duty during the "Iowa Cow War," September 25, 1931
- Date: September 21–25, 1931
- Location: Cedar County, Iowa, US
- Type: Rebellion
- Cause: Bovine tuberculosis testing
- Motive: Income from slaughtered cows
- Participants: Iowa farmers
- Outcome: Successful testing
- Arrests: Jacob W. Lenker; Paul Moore

The Iowa Cow War was a series of violent disputes over the testing of cows for bovine tuberculosis in Iowa, United States, in 1931. After distrustful farmers tried and failed to repeal the testing program, they congregated to block tests from taking place. The farmers believed that the test might infect cows with tuberculosis or make pregnant cows have spontaneous abortions. They also believed that the testing was unconstitutional. The owner of Muscatine radio station KTNT, Norman G. Baker, spread misinformation which resulted in more farmers protesting the testing, sometimes violently. Fifty veterinarians, all working in pairs and while being protected, gave injections to 5,000 cattle per day for a week.

The Iowa Cow War came to a conclusion when 31 Iowa National Guard units were deployed to stop the protesting. Two farmers were convicted for their actions during the conflict and spent 40 days in jail. There was one serious injury, and no deaths. Most of the testing was completed by October 1931.

== Background ==
Bovine tuberculosis was a problem in the US state of Iowa and in 1929 attempts at eradication were approved. An Iowa veterinarian in 1894 said that tuberculosis was the main issue that his office faced. People often did not understand the danger of tuberculosis in cows due to the long period of incubation and its effects. Many respected medical professionals thought that cows were unable to transmit the disease to people, including Robert Koch, who completed early research on tuberculosis. The State of Iowa began requiring testing to reduce the frequency with which dairy cattle with tuberculosis could contaminate the milk supply and cause milk-drinking people to contract the disease. The program was financed by a property tax levy of up to three mills. In 1929, the Iowa State Legislature passed a law requiring all dairy and breeding cows to be tested for bovine tuberculosis. Iowa farmers, who did not trust the tests, were opposed to the law. The farmers believed that the test might infect cows with tuberculosis or make pregnant cows have spontaneous abortions. They also thought that the test was against the United States Constitution, but this was dismissed by the Iowa Supreme Court in 1930.

Veterinarians, who were approved by the State of Iowa, injected tuberculin under the base of the cows' tails. After 72 hours, the veterinarians would see if the cows had any reactions to the tuberculin, such as swelling. Cows that reacted were slaughtered and the farmers were paid an indemnity. The farmers did not receive the market share of their cows after they were slaughtered, and the slaughter value was subtracted from the appraised value. Farmers asserted that the test lowered milk quality and the cows' release of milk.

== Early protests ==
Muscatine KTNT radio station owner Norman G. Baker spread misinformation in southeastern Iowa about medical professionals, Iowa politicians, farming magazines, and Iowa universities. Baker's words caused farmers to rebel in Cedar County. In February 1931, two years after the adoption of the testing law, 1,000 farmers traveled by train from Tipton, Iowa to the Iowa State Capitol in Des Moines. On arrival, they demanded that the Iowa Legislature make the tests optional. After the Legislature refused to do so, the farmers decided to act on their own.

On March 9, 1931, over 500 people protested at the south of Tipton, Iowa at a farm owned by E. C. Mitchell, who had previously worked with four other farmers to resist the testing of their cows. On April 14, 1931, Iowa veterinarians and 20 nearby police officers were at farmer William C. Butterbrodt's farm, northeast of Tipton, to test his cows for tuberculosis. Almost 1,000 protesters traveled to Butterbrodt's farm to block testing, though no acts of violence occurred. Another meeting was held at the Iowa State Capitol on March 19, 1931, with more than 1,500 people attending. Iowa Governor Dan Turner kept the mandatory testing in place. Veterinarian Peter Malcolm was forced off of E. C. Mitchell's farm in Cedar County on April 10, 1931, after Macolm succeeded in testing 12 cows. 75 protesters confronted Malcolm and several officials, prompting Iowa agent Earl Gaughenbaugh to tell the farmers to leave. After a cow was identified as having tuberculosis, Mitchell had two protestors throw Malcolm off the land. Assistant Attorney General Oral Swift was pushed against a barbed wire fence. Mitchell said that he only allowed the testing to "lead them on". Newspaper reporters were unable to write stories about the Mitchell farm incident due to protestors, and The Des Moines Register and Tribune took photographs from the air that showed automobiles that were parked to prevent the farmers' cows from being tested. Malcolm's tests on Mitchell's farm were about to expire, and Turner met with some protesters in Iowa City. The National Guard was deployed to Cedar Rapids on the morning of Malcolm reviewing the test results, but they were sent home shortly after on the same day. The final step of testing succeeded without issues, and one bull reacted. The 15 farmers who met with Turner in Iowa City had an assembly at Butterbrodt's farm on April 14, 1931. Turner said that only the farmers' elected representative could change the testing law. Smaller conflicts continued, with veterinarians being forced off farms.

== Cow War ==
The Cow War happened during the fall of 1931, with most of it taking place in Cedar County, Iowa. People signed petitions and held rallies while not allowing officials to enter their farms. To prevent the advancement of the officials, the farmers stopped them from entering the roads while attacking the veterinarians by throwing things at them, including chamber pot contents. When a farmer was arrested and placed in jail, a mob freed him from his confines. On September 21, 1931, when state officials left the courthouse at noon, protestors followed them to Jacob W. Lenker's farm. Three hundred or four hundred farmers went to Lenker's with crudely made weapons to attack 63 or 65 officers and two veterinarians. The farmers threw mud and rocks at the officers, while also swinging clubs and slashing the officers' tires. The farmers also had pitchforks. Tear gas was used against the farmers, but there was not much effect. Malcolm's tires were punctured, his gas line was slashed, and mud was put in his radiator. The chief of the Iowa Division of Criminal Investigation, James Risdon, told Iowa Governor Dan Turner about the situation being "out of control". The next day, Turner started martial law and had 1,800 Iowa National Guardsmen in 31 units from the 133rd and 168th Infantry Regiments and 113th Cavalry Regiment travel to Tipton and set up a base on the Tipton fairgrounds. It cost over $1,000 to send in troops. People heard yells of "Here comes the Army!" and "You farmers better run!" when the troops jumped from the rail cars. Business owners were worried that farmers would boycott them for not wanting to participate. The advancement of soldiers with drawn bayonets backed up the testing.

Machine guns were placed facing country roads, sentries patrolled the area, and armed outposts were built as soldiers and veterinarians traveled around Cedar County to test cows for tuberculosis; the farmers gave in for the most part due to the soldiers. Fifty veterinarians, all working in pairs, gave injections to 5,000 cattle per day for a week while being protected. A small number of the tested cows were infected. Most of the testing was completed by October 1931, and the last of the soldiers left on November 25, 1931. The only serious casualty was that of a soldier due to a bullet wound he received from cleaning his gun, but the soldier did not die.

The veterinarians saw no cows on Lenker's farm due to his selling his 21 cattle to farmer Harry Duffy in Muscatine County. As he was not allowed to interfere with the process or move his cattle, Lenker was charged for contempt of court and conspiracy jointly with farmer Paul Moore for violating the tuberculin test law. They were sentenced to up to three-year terms in the Fort Madison, Iowa, penitentiary. Lenker and Moore were paroled 40 days later.
