= 2nd Infantry Brigade Combat Team, 34th Infantry Division =

Iowa Army National Guard unit

Shoulder sleeve insignia of 34th Infantry Division.

The 2nd Infantry Brigade Combat Team, 34th Infantry Division is an Iowa Army National Guard unit headquartered in Boone, Iowa.

== History ==
47th Infantry Division shoulder sleeve insignia worn by 34th Infantry Brigade, now 2nd Brigade, 34th Division, 1968–91.

The history of the 2nd Brigade Headquarters began in June 1924 with the activation in Boone of Headquarters Battery and Combat Train, 2nd Battalion, 185th Field Artillery, a unit of the 34th Infantry Division.

In July 1940 the unit was reorganized as Headquarters Battery, 2nd Battalion, 185th Field Artillery. In December 1940 the unit was again reorganized, this time as Battery F, 185th Field Artillery. In February 1941 Battery F was federalized for World War II, this time as Battery C, 185th Field Artillery. The 185th Field Artillery served in the North African and Italian campaigns as part of the 34th Infantry Division.

Battery C returned from World War II service in November 1945. In January 1947 it was reorganized as Headquarters Battery, 185th Field Artillery.

In 1959 Headquarters Battery was reconfigured as Headquarters Battery, 4th Battalion (Rocket Howitzer), 185th Field Artillery. In 1963 another reorganization resulted in the unit's designation as Headquarters Battery, 4th Battalion (Howitzer), 185th Field Artillery.

Headquarters Battery went through consolidation and reorganization in 1968 and became Headquarters and Headquarters Company, 34th Brigade, 47th Infantry Division. In February 1991 the 47th Division was inactivated, and 34th Brigade was re-designated as 2nd Brigade, 34th Infantry Division.

=== Recent events ===
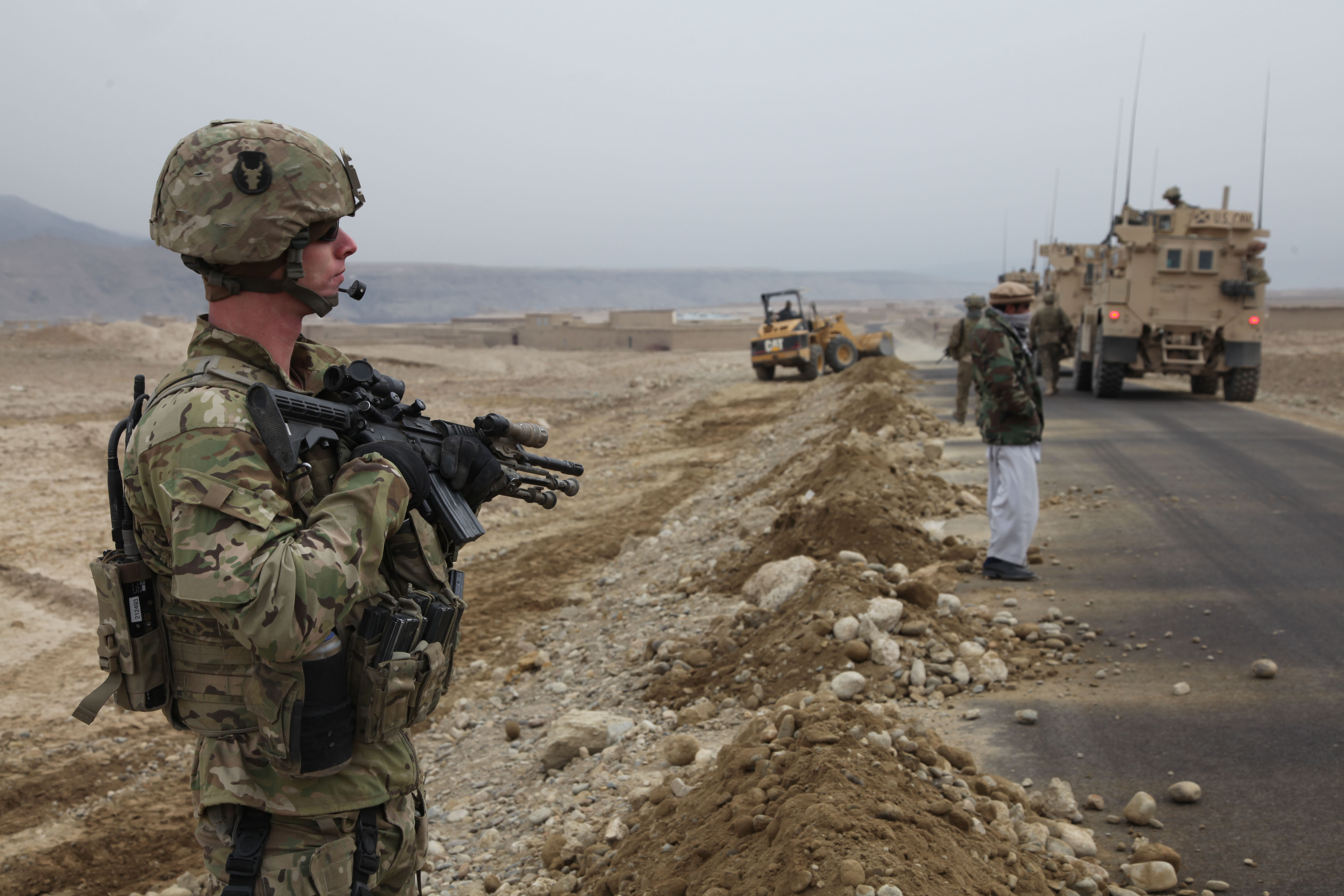
1-113th Cavalry provides security for soldiers talking to villagers, Parwan province, Afghanistan, 13 January 2011.

Prior to 2005, 2nd Brigade was organized as an Air Assault Brigade. In that configuration it consisted of three infantry battalions including 2nd Battalion, 135th Infantry in Minnesota. In addition, 1st Battalion, 194th Field Artillery, the 334th Forward Support Battalion and an Engineer company were part of 2nd Brigade's direct support.

After the 11 September attacks, individuals and units from the 2nd Brigade were deployed as part of the war on terror, including Operations Noble Eagle, Iraqi Freedom, Enduring Freedom, and New Dawn.

When 2nd Brigade was reorganized as a modular infantry brigade combat team (IBCT) in 2005, 1st Battalion, 194th Field Artillery and the reorganized 334th Brigade Support Battalion became part of the brigade's task organization. The change to an IBCT also included removing 2nd Battalion, 135th Infantry from the task organization and adding 1st Squadron, 113th Cavalry.

2nd Brigade has continued its Air Assault tradition. In 2010 and 2011 the 2nd Brigade served in Afghanistan. During this deployment the organization conducted "Operation Bull Whip," a successful Air Assault mission in Laghman Province.

== Honors ==
Algeria-French Morocco (World War II)

== Organization 2025 ==
As of February 2026 the 2nd Infantry Brigade Combat Team, 34th Infantry Division consists of the following units:

- 2nd Infantry Brigade Combat Team, 34th Infantry Division, in Boone (IA)
  - Headquarters and Headquarters Company, 2nd Infantry Brigade Combat Team, 34th Infantry Division, in Boone (IA)
  - 1st Squadron, 113th Cavalry Regiment, in Sioux City (IA)
    - Headquarters and Headquarters Troop, 1st Squadron, 113th Cavalry Regiment, in Sioux City (IA)
    - Troop A, 1st Squadron, 113th Cavalry Regiment, at Camp Dodge (IA)
    - Troop B, 1st Squadron, 113th Cavalry Regiment, at Camp Dodge (IA)
    - Troop C (Dismounted), 1st Squadron, 113th Cavalry Regiment, in Le Mars (IA)
  - 1st Battalion, 133rd Infantry Regiment, in Waterloo (IA)
    - Headquarters and Headquarters Company, 1st Battalion, 133rd Infantry Regiment, in Waterloo (IA)
    - Company A, 1st Battalion, 133rd Infantry Regiment, in Dubuque (IA)
    - Company B, 1st Battalion, 133rd Infantry Regiment, in Iowa City (IA)
    - Company C, 1st Battalion, 133rd Infantry Regiment, in Iowa Falls (IA)
      - Detachment 1, Company C, 1st Battalion, 133rd Infantry Regiment, in Oelwein (IA)
    - Company D (Weapons), 1st Battalion, 133rd Infantry Regiment, in Davenport (IA)
  - 2nd Battalion, 135th Infantry Regiment, in Mankato (MN) (Minnesota Army National Guard)
    - Headquarters and Headquarters Company, 2nd Battalion, 135th Infantry Regiment, in Mankato (MN)
      - Detachment 1, Headquarters and Headquarters Company, 2nd Battalion, 135th Infantry Regiment, in Owatonna (MN)
    - Company A, 2nd Battalion, 135th Infantry Regiment, in West St. Paul (MN)
    - Company B, 2nd Battalion, 135th Infantry Regiment, in Rochester (MN)
    - Company C, 2nd Battalion, 135th Infantry Regiment, in Winona (MN)
    - Company D (Weapons), 2nd Battalion, 135th Infantry Regiment, in Albert Lea (MN)
  - 1st Battalion, 168th Infantry Regiment, in Council Bluffs (IA)
    - Headquarters and Headquarters Company, 1st Battalion, 168th Infantry Regiment, in Council Bluffs (IA)
    - Company A, 1st Battalion, 168th Infantry Regiment, in Carroll (IA)
      - Detachment 1, Company A, 1st Battalion, 168th Infantry Regiment, in Denison (IA)
    - Company B, 1st Battalion, 168th Infantry Regiment, in Shenandoah (IA)
      - Detachment 1, Company B, 1st Battalion, 168th Infantry Regiment, at Camp Dodge (IA)
    - Company C, 1st Battalion, 168th Infantry Regiment, at Camp Dodge (IA)
    - Company D (Weapons), 1st Battalion, 168th Infantry Regiment, in Council Bluffs (IA)
  - 224th Brigade Engineer Battalion, in Davenport (IA)
    - Headquarters and Headquarters Company, 224th Brigade Engineer Battalion, in Davenport (IA)
    - Company A (Combat Engineer), 224th Brigade Engineer Battalion, in Mount Pleasant (IA)
    - Company B (Combat Engineer), 224th Brigade Engineer Battalion, in Davenport (IA)
    - Company C (Signal), 224th Brigade Engineer Battalion, in Cedar Rapids (IA)
    - Company D (Military Intelligence), 224th Brigade Engineer Battalion, at Camp Dodge (IA)
      - Detachment 1, Company D (Military Intelligence), 224th Brigade Engineer Battalion, at Boone Municipal Airport (IA) (RQ-28A UAV)
  - 1st Battalion, 194th Field Artillery Regiment, in Fort Dodge (IA)
    - Headquarters and Headquarters Battery 1st Battalion, 194th Field Artillery Regiment, in Fort Dodge (IA)
      - Detachment 1, Headquarters and Headquarters Battery, 1st Battalion, 194th Field Artillery Regiment, in Spencer (IA)
      - Detachment 2, Headquarters and Headquarters Battery, 1st Battalion, 194th Field Artillery Regiment, in Charles City (IA)
      - Detachment 3, Headquarters and Headquarters Battery, 1st Battalion, 194th Field Artillery Regiment, in Owatonna (MN) (Minnesota Army National Guard)
      - Detachment 4, Headquarters and Headquarters Battery, 1st Battalion, 194th Field Artillery Regiment, at Camp Dodge (IA)
    - Battery A, 1st Battalion, 194th Field Artillery Regiment, in Spencer (IA)
    - Battery B, 1st Battalion, 194th Field Artillery Regiment, at Camp Dodge (IA)
      - Detachment 1, Battery B, 1st Battalion, 194th Field Artillery Regiment, in Dubuque (IA)
    - Battery C, 1st Battalion, 194th Field Artillery Regiment, at Camp Dodge (IA)
  - 334th Brigade Support Battalion, in Cedar Rapids (IA)
    - Headquarters and Headquarters Company, 334th Brigade Support Battalion, in Cedar Rapids (IA)
    - Company A (Distribution), 334th Brigade Support Battalion, in Cedar Rapids (IA)
    - Company B (Maintenance), 334th Brigade Support Battalion, in Cedar Rapids (IA)
    - Company C (Medical), 334th Brigade Support Battalion, at Camp Dodge (IA)
    - Company D (Forward Support), 334th Brigade Support Battalion, in Sioux City (IA) — attached to 1st Squadron, 113th Cavalry Regiment
    - Company E (Forward Support), 334th Brigade Support Battalion, in Davenport (IA) — attached to 224th Brigade Engineer Battalion
      - Detachment 1, Company E (Forward Support), 334th Brigade Support Battalion, in Mount Pleasant (IA)
    - Company F (Forward Support), 334th Brigade Support Battalion, in Storm Lake (IA) — attached to 1st Battalion, 194th Field Artillery Regiment
    - Company G (Forward Support), 334th Brigade Support Battalion, in Waterloo (IA) — attached to 1st Battalion, 133rd Infantry Regiment
    - Company H (Forward Support), 334th Brigade Support Battalion, in Red Oak (IA) — attached to 1st Battalion, 168th Infantry Regiment
    - Company I (Forward Support), 334th Brigade Support Battalion, in Arden Hills (MN) — attached to 2nd Battalion, 135th Infantry Regiment (Minnesota Army National Guard)
