= KTNT =

KTNT may refer to:

- KTNT (FM), a radio station (102.5 FM) licensed to Eufaula, Oklahoma, United States
- KTNT in Muscatine, Iowa, active 1925–1931 and licensed to the controversial Norman G. Baker, which was succeeded by Mexican station XENT in Nuevo Laredo, Tamaulipas, which was active 1933–1941.
- KIRO-FM, a radio station in Seattle, Washington, United States which held the call sign KTNT-FM in Tacoma, Washington from 1948 to 1972.
- KITZ, an AM band radio station in Silverdale, Washington which held the call sign KTNT from 1948 to 1983 and was licensed to Tacoma, Washington.
- KSTW-TV, a CW O&O station (channel 11 analog/36 digital) licensed to Tacoma, Washington and serving the Seattle-Tacoma market, which held the call sign KTNT-TV from 1953 to 1974
- WWLS-FM, a radio station in The Village, Oklahoma, which held the call sign KTNT-FM from 1988 to 1999
- Dade-Collier Training and Transition Airport (ICAO code KTNT)
