= 168th Infantry Regiment (United States) =

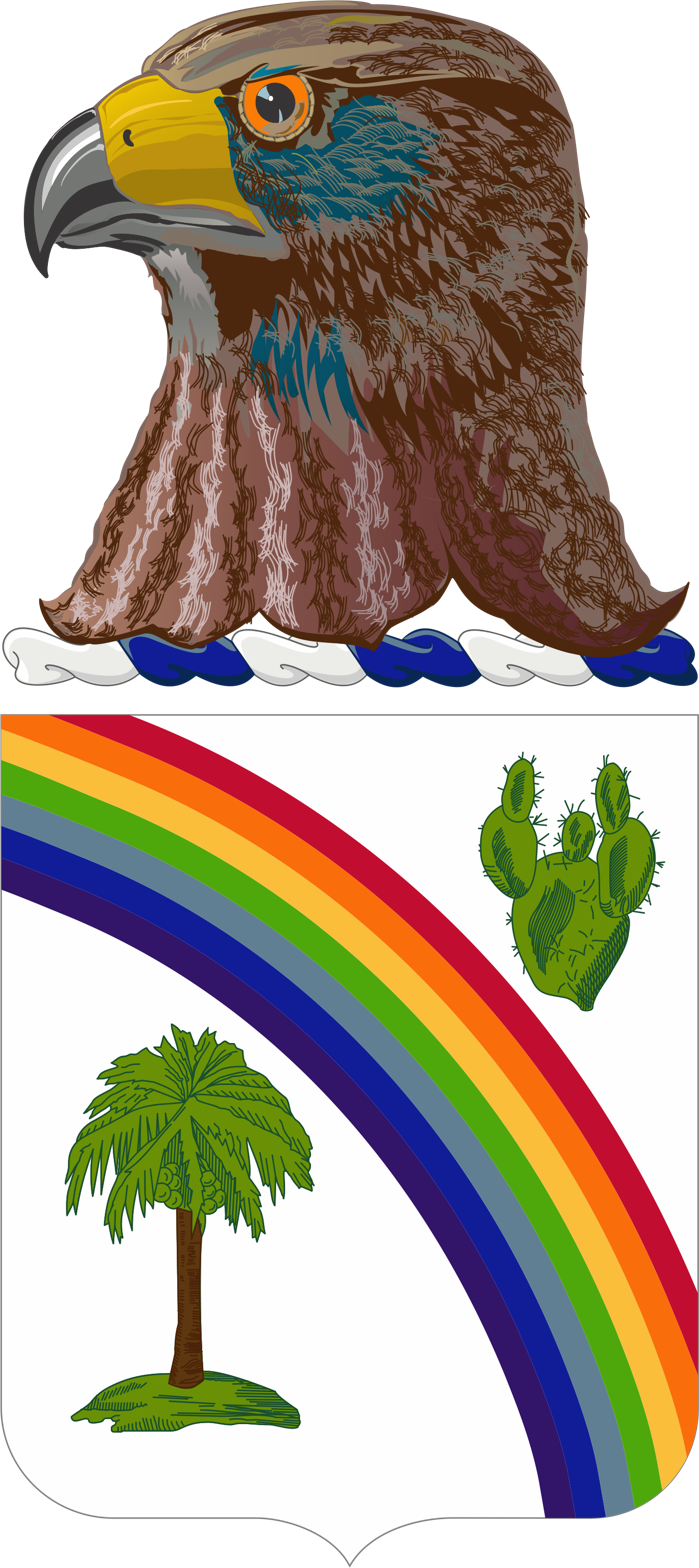
- Coat of arms
- Active: 1861 to Present
- Country: United States
- Allegiance: Iowa
- Branch: Iowa Army National Guard
- Size: Regiment
- Part of: 34th Infantry Division
- Nickname: Third Iowa (Special Designation)
- Motto: ON GUARD

Commanders
- Notable commanders: John W. O'Daniel

Insignia
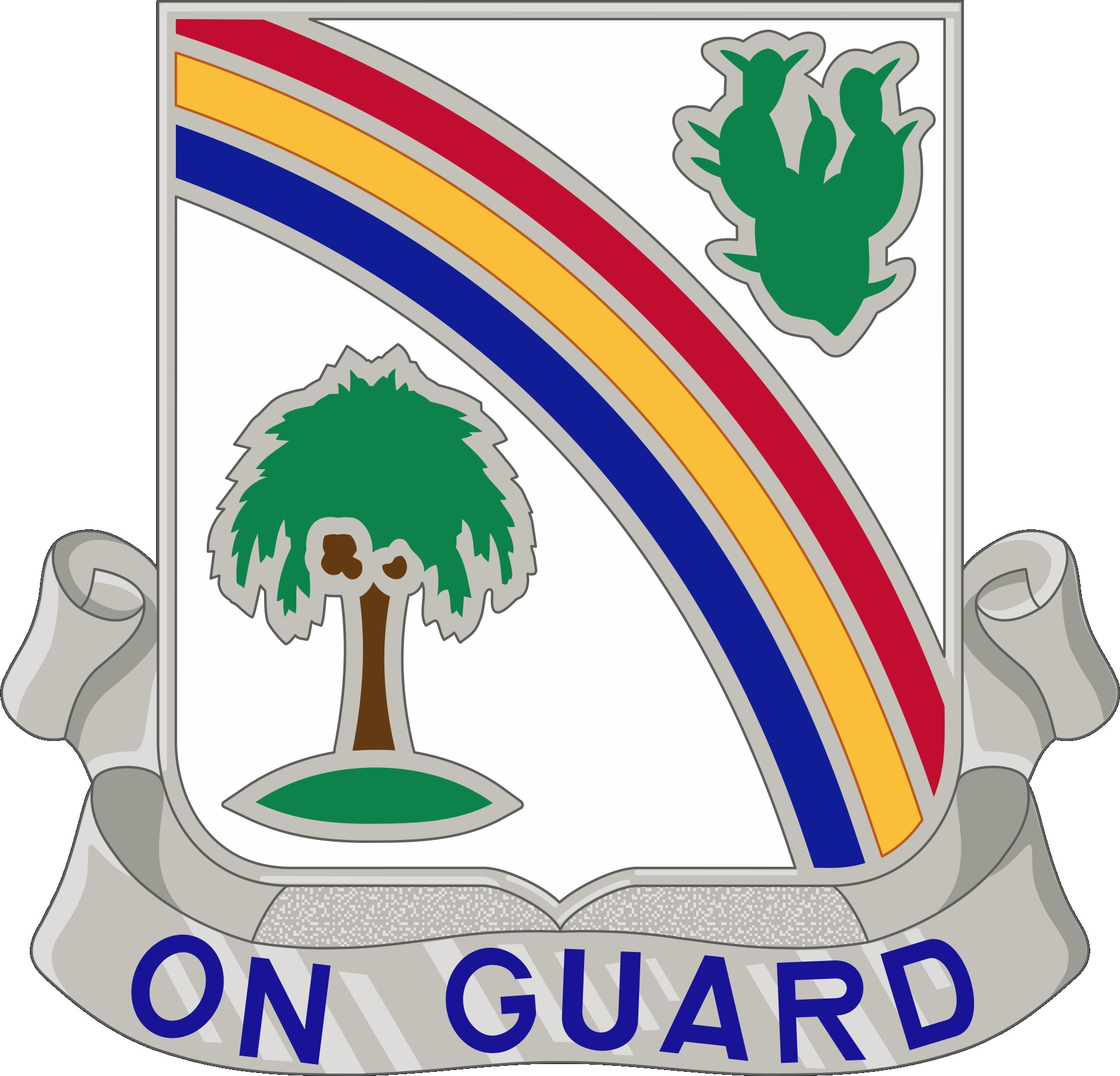
- Distinctive unit insignia

The 168th Infantry Regiment ("Third Iowa") is an infantry regiment of the United States Army. The 1st Battalion of the 168th Infantry is part of the 2nd Infantry Brigade Combat Team, 34th Infantry Division, part of the Iowa Army National Guard.

== History ==
=== American Civil War ===
During the Civil War the regiment was organized from independent companies in southwestern Iowa and mustered into federal service on 8 August 1861 as the 4th Regiment, Iowa Volunteer Infantry. It was reorganized on 1 January 1864 as the 4th Iowa Veteran Infantry Regiment, and mustered out of federal service 24 July 1865 at Louisville, Kentucky.

=== Post-Civil War ===
It was reorganized from 1868 to 1876 in Iowa as independent companies of volunteer militia, and these companies were consolidated on 18 February 1876 and 15 January 1877 to form the 3rd and 5th Infantry Regiments, respectively. The Iowa State Militia was redesignated on 3 April 1878 as the Iowa National Guard. The 3rd and 5th Infantry Regiments were consolidated on 30 April 1892, and the consolidated unit was designated the 3rd Infantry Regiment.

=== Spanish-American War ===
On 30 May 1898, during the Spanish–American War, the regiment was mustered into federal service at Des Moines as the 51st Iowa Volunteer Infantry; and mustered out of federal service on 2 November 1899 at San Francisco, California. It was reorganized on 26 March 1900 in the Iowa National Guard as the 51st Infantry Regiment with its headquarters at Des Moines.

On 26 November 1902 it was redesignated as the 55th Infantry Regiment, and on 4 July 1915 was redesignated as the 3rd Infantry Regiment.

=== Punitive Expedition and World War I ===
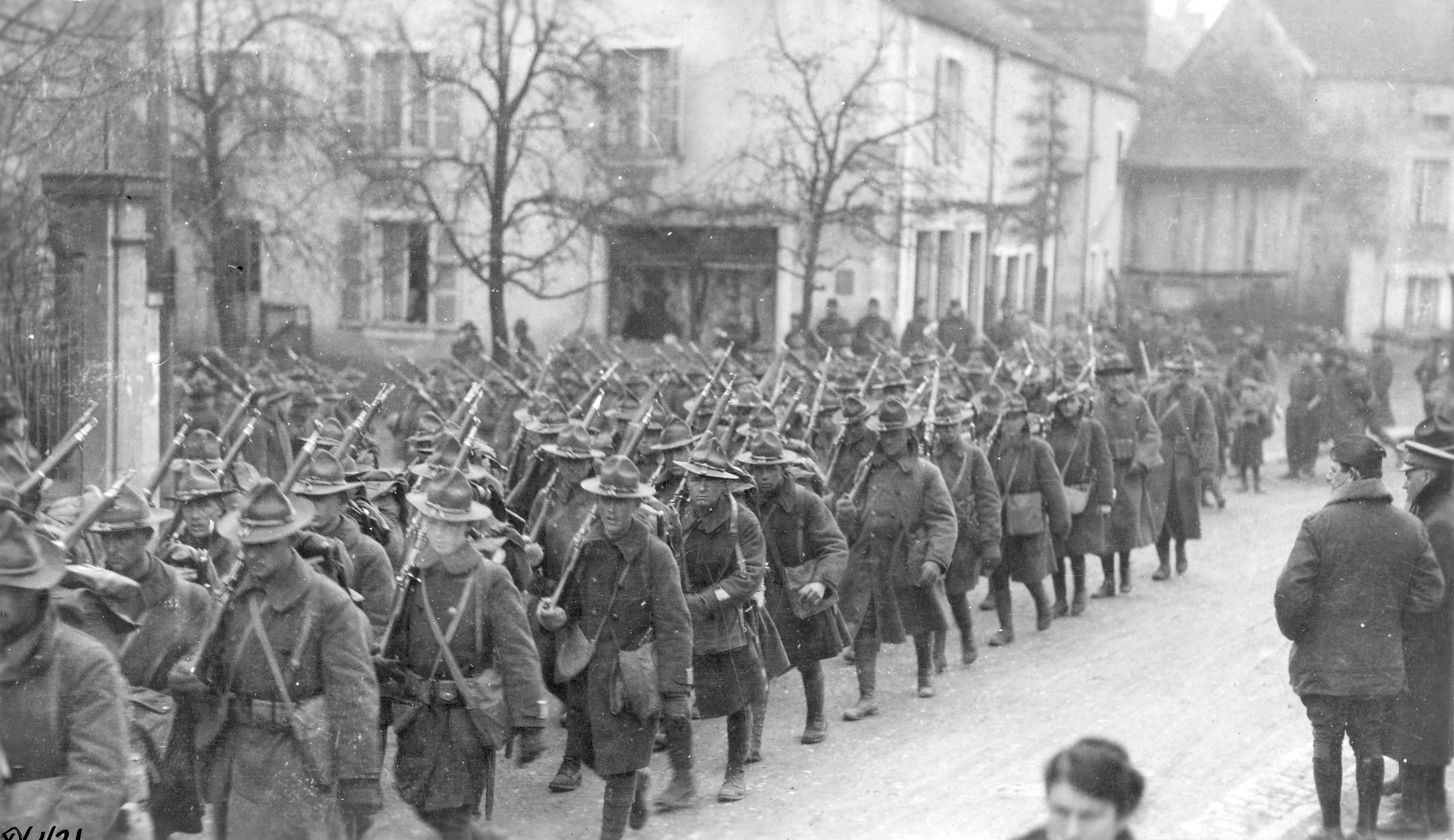
1918 at Rolampont, Haute-Marne

The 3rd Iowa was mustered into federal service on 26 June 1916 at Camp Dodge, Iowa, and mustered out of federal service on 20 February 1917 at Des Moines. After the United States entered World War I it was drafted into federal service again on 5 August 1917, reorganized and redesignated on 16 August 1917 as the 168th Infantry Regiment, and assigned to the 42nd "Rainbow" Division.

==== Commanders ====
- Colonel Ernest R. Bennett (5 August 1917–3 September 1918)
- Colonel Mathew A. Tinley (3 September 1918–17 May 1919)

=== Interwar period ===
The 168th Infantry arrived at the port of New York on 25 April 1919 on the troopship USS Leviathan and was demobilized on 17 May 1919 at Camp Dodge. Per the National Defense Act of 1920, the 168th Infantry was reconstituted in the National Guard in 1921 and allotted to Iowa. It was concurrently relieved from the 42nd Division and assigned to the 34th Division. It was reorganized on 13 July 1921 with the regimental headquarters organized and federally recognized at Des Moines. The entire regiment, or elements thereof, was called up to perform the following state duties: tornado relief work at Neola and Persia, Iowa, 7–8 June 1925; riot control during the “Cow War” at Cedar County/Burlington, Iowa, 21 September–25 November 1931; the 1st and 3rd Battalions performed martial law in Plymouth and Crawford Counties, respectively, during the Farmers' Holiday Association disturbances, 28 April–17 May 1933; the 1st Battalion performed martial law at Newton, Iowa, during the labor troubles at the Maytag washing machine plant, 19 July–6 August 1938. The regimental headquarters was relocated on 27 January 1937 to Council Bluffs. The 168th Infantry conducted annual summer training most years at Camp Dodge from 1921–39. For at least two years, in 1938 and 1940, the regiment also trained some eighteen company-grade Organized Reserve infantry officers of the 88th Division at Camp Dodge and Camp Ripley, Minnesota. The regiment was inducted into federal service at home stations on 10 February 1941 and moved to Camp Claiborne, Louisiana, where it arrived on 3 March 1941. In August-September 1941, it participated in the Louisiana Maneuvers.

==== Commanders ====
- Colonel Guy S. Brewer (13 July 1921–November 1923)
- Colonel Glenn C. Haynes (24 November 1923–26 October 1936)
- Col. George F. Everest (26 October 1936–June 1942)

=== World War II ===
On 8 January 1942, the 168th Infantry staged at Fort Dix, New Jersey, with the rest of the 34th Infantry Division, and departed the New York Port of Embarkation on 30 April 1942, arriving in Northern Ireland on 13 May 1942. The regiment further moved to Scotland on 23 August 1942. The 168th Infantry landed at Algiers, French Algeria, during Operation Torch, the Allied invasion of North Africa, on 8 November 1942. Led by Colonel Thomas Drake, it took Sened Station on 1 February 1943, but suffered heavy losses in the subsequent Battle of the Kasserine Pass. The unit landed on mainland Italy on 21 September 1943, where it spent the rest of the war fighting the Axis. The 168th Infantry returned to the United States via the Hampton Roads Port of Embarkation, Virginia on 3 November 1945 and was inactivated on the same date at Camp Patrick Henry.

=== Cold War ===
Reorganized and federally recognized on 23 January 1947 with headquarters at Council Bluffs, it was reorganized on 1 May 1959 as a parent regiment under the Combat Arms Regimental System to consist of the 1st Battle Group, an element of the 34th Infantry Division. Reorganized on 1 March 1963 to consist of the 1st Battle Group, and relieved from assignment to the 34th Infantry Division. Reorganized on 1 March 1964 to consist of the 1st and 2nd Battalions. Reorganized on 1 January 1968 to consist of the 1st Battalion, an element of the 47th Infantry Division. It was withdrawn on 1 May 1989 from the Combat Arms Regimental System and reorganized under the U.S. Army Regimental System.

=== Modern ===
Reorganized 10 February 1991 to consist of the 1st Battalion, an element of the 34th Infantry Division. Ordered into active federal service on 5 March 2004 at home stations; released from active federal service 1 September 2005 and reverted to state control. Company D, 1st Battalion, 168th Infantry was ordered into active federal service 4 June 2007 at Denison The 1st Battalion, 168th Infantry deployed to Afghanistan in 2004 where it provided provincial reconstruction team (PRT) security forces (SECFOR). The battalion was ordered again into active federal service on 31 July 2010 at home stations to deploy to Afghanistan in support of Operation Enduring Freedom (OEF). The battalion conducted post mobilization training at Camp Shelby, MS from August to October 2010, culminating with a mission rehearsal exercise (MRX) at the National Training Center at Fort Irwin, California.

Upon deployment into Afghanistan, 1st Battalion, 168th Infantry became Task Force 1-168 and assumed responsibility for the Afghan Province of Paktya. Task Force 1-168's mission was to conduct security force assistance through combined action with Afghan Security Forces that resided in Paktya. Task Force 1-168 conducted a transfer of authority with Task Force 1-279 (Oklahoma Army National Guard) on 10 July 2011 and redeployed to the Continental United States (CONUS) in July 2011.

== Campaign participation credit ==
Civil War

- Vicksburg
- Chattanooga
- Atlanta
- Arkansas 1862
- Alabama 1863
- North Carolina 1865
- South Carolina 1865

Philippine Insurrection

- Manila
- Malolos

World War I

- Champagne-Marne
- Aisne-Marne
- St. Mihiel
- Meuse-Argonne
- Lorraine 1918
- Champagne 1918

World War II

- Algeria-French Morocco (with arrowhead)
- Tunisia
- Naples-Foggia

Operation Raincoat - First Battle of Monte Cassino

- Anzio
- Rome-Arno
- North Apennines
- Po Valley

War on terrorism

- Campaigns to be determined

== Decorations ==
- French Croix de Guerre with Palm, World War II, Streamer embroidered BELVEDERE
- Presidential Unit Citation (Army), streamer embroidered MT PANTANO ITALY (1st Battalion, 168th Infantry Regiment, 29 November-3 December 1943, WD GO 86, 1944)
- Presidential Unit Citation (Army), streamer embroidered CERVARO ITALY (2nd Battalion, 168th Infantry Regiment, 6-13 January 1944, WD GO 6, 1945)
