= 248th Aviation Support Battalion =

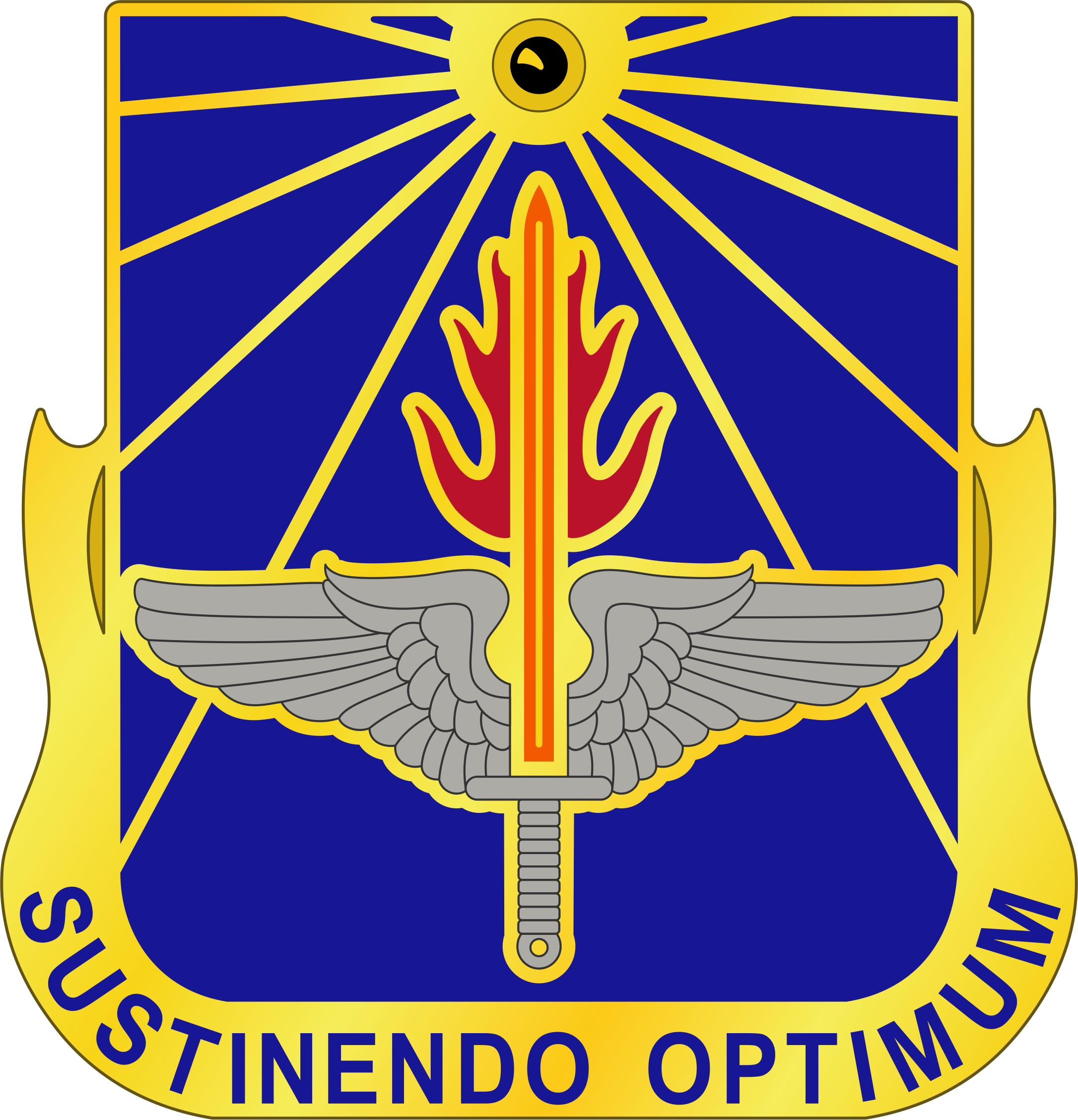
- The 248th's Distinctive Unit Insignia
- Country: United States of America
- Branch: National Guard
- Type: Battalion
- Role: Aviation support
- Size: Approx 670 Soldiers
- Part of: Iowa Army National Guard
- Garrison/HQ: Boone

The 248th Aviation Support Battalion (ASB) is a US Army National Guard battalion headquartered in Boone, Iowa.

== Structure ==
- Headquarters Support Company at Davenport (IA ARNG)
  - Detachment 1 at Boone (IA ARNG)
  - Detachment 2 at Waterloo (IA ARNG)
- Company A at Waterloo (IA ARNG)
  - Detachment 1 at Clinton (IA ARNG)
  - Detachment 2 at Muscatine (IA ARNG)
- Company B at Boone (IA ARNG)
  - Detachment 2 at Sandston, VA (VA ARNG)
  - Detachment 3 at Waterloo (IA ARNG)
  - Detachment 4 at Davenport (IA ARNG)
  - Detachment 5 at Edgewood, MD (MD ARNG)(MD ARNG)
- Company C (Signal) at Lexington Park, MD (MD ARNG)
