= 113th Cavalry Regiment =

113th Cavalry
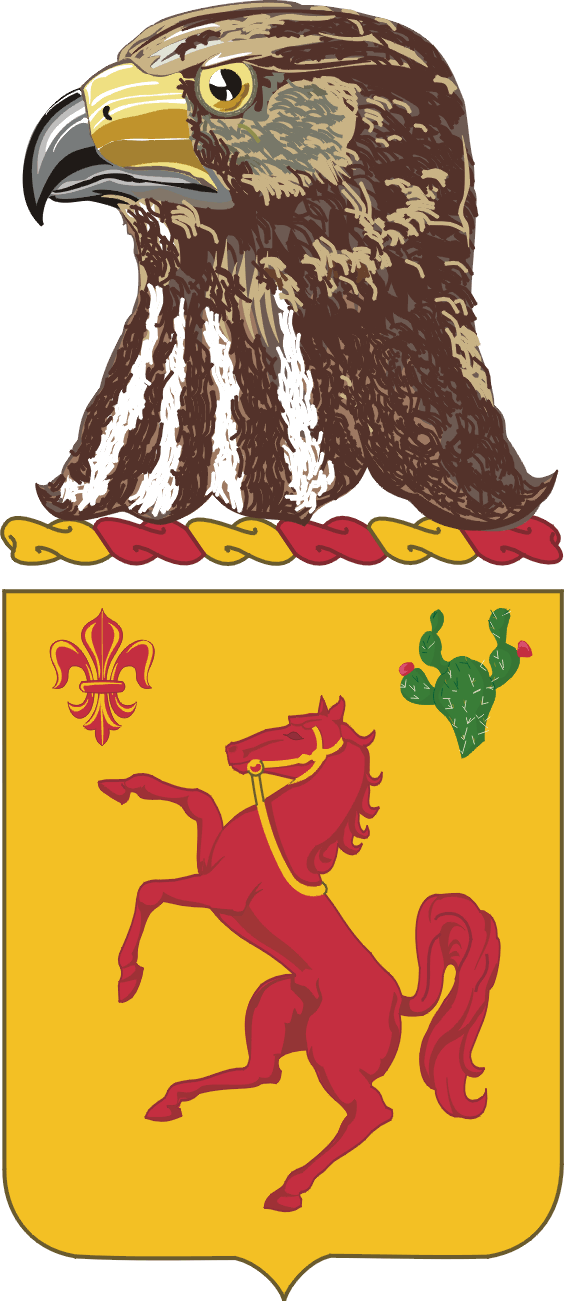
- Coat of arms
- Active: 1921–1950; 1992 – present
- Country: United States
- Branch: United States Army
- Type: Reconnaissance, surveillance, and target acquisition (RSTA)
- Garrison/HQ: Sioux City, Iowa
- Nickname: Red Horse Squadron
- Motto: We Maintain
- Colors: Red, Yellow
- Engagements: World War II: Normandy, Northern France, Rhineland, Germany; War on terror: Afghanistan

Commanders
- Current commander: Lieutenant Colonel Kent Greiner
- Notable commanders: Colonel William S. Biddle, MG Timothy E. Orr

The 113th Cavalry Regiment is a cavalry regiment of the Iowa National Guard, with history tracing back to the 19th century Indian Wars.

It was heavily involved in fighting during World War II against German forces in France, Belgium, the Netherlands, and Germany from June 1944 to May 1945.

A new unit bearing the name of the 113th Cavalry was reactivated in 1992. Since then, the 1st Squadron, 113th Cavalry, part of the 2nd Brigade Combat Team, 34th Infantry Division, has conducted peace keeping operations in Kosovo and combat deployments during Operation Iraqi Freedom and Operation Enduring Freedom.

== History ==
=== 113th Cavalry (I) ===
Iowa had organized the 1st Cavalry Squadron in 1915, a unit with four troops (companies) that saw service on the Mexican frontier during the pursuit of Pancho Villa. During World War I, the squadron was split up; Troop A became the division headquarters troop for the 34th Division, Troop B was reorganized as part of the 125th Machine Gun Battalion, 34th Division, Troop C was reorganized as part of the 133rd Infantry Regiment, 34th Division, Troop D was reorganized as part of the 109th Ammunition Train, 34th Division, and the band was reorganized as part of the 301st Cavalry Regiment. The 34th Division shipped to France in late 1918, but did not see any combat, and the 301st Cavalry Regiment was converted to field artillery units in the summer of 1918, but none of these units shipped overseas before the end of the war.

The 113th Cavalry was constituted in the National Guard in 1921, assigned to the 24th Cavalry Division, and allotted to Iowa. The regimental headquarters was organized on 1 June 1921 at Iowa City, Iowa, by redesignation of the 1st Regiment, Iowa Cavalry (constituted in 1920; organized and federally recognized on 3 May 1921 at Iowa City). The 1st Squadron headquarters was organized on 27 September 1921 at Des Moines, Iowa, and the 2nd Squadron headquarters was organized on 5 May 1921 at Ottumwa, Iowa. On 11 April 1929, the regiment was reorganized as a three-squadron regiment, with a new 3rd Squadron organized with headquarters at Iowa City. The entire regiment performed riot control duties during the "Iowa Cow War" in Cedar County, Iowa, from 21 September–25 November 1931, while the regimental headquarters, Machine Gun Troop, and Troops B, E, and F performed martial law at Newton, Iowa, in connection with labor troubles at the Maytag washing machine plant from 6–15 August 1938. The regiment conducted summer training at Camp Dodge, Iowa, from 1921–27 and 1929–40, and at Fort Riley, Kansas, in 1927–28. For at least 2 years, in 1939 and 1940, the regiment also trained 20 company-grade cavalry officers of the 66th Cavalry Division at Camp Dodge and Camp Ripley, Minnesota. In September 1940, the 113th Cavalry was reorganized and redesignated the 113th Cavalry Regiment (Horse-Mechanized) and concurrently relieved from the 24th Cavalry Division, being assigned to the VIII Corps on 30 December 1940. The regiment was inducted into federal service at home stations on 13 January 1941 and moved to Camp Bowie, near Brownwood, Texas, on 25 January 1941.

The 113th Cavalry Regiment, still nominally a horse-mechanized unit, sailed to England, arriving on 28 January 1944. In England, the regiment was converted to the 113th Cavalry Group (Mechanized), with the 1st Squadron becoming the 113th Cavalry Squadron (Mechanized) and the 2nd Squadron becoming the 125th Cavalry Squadron (Mechanized). Under the combat group concept, even though the two squadrons were only "attached" to the 113th Cavalry Group headquarters as opposed to permanently "assigned" and could be attached and detached at will as the tactical situation warranted, they served as essentially organic elements of the 113th Cavalry Group. Subsequently, the 113th Cavalry Group served as the XIX Corps' mechanized cavalry group, fighting in Normandy, the Netherlands and the conquest of Germany. The 113th Cavalry Group returned to the New York port of entry on 25 October 1945 and was inactivated at Camp Shanks, New York, on 26 October 1945.

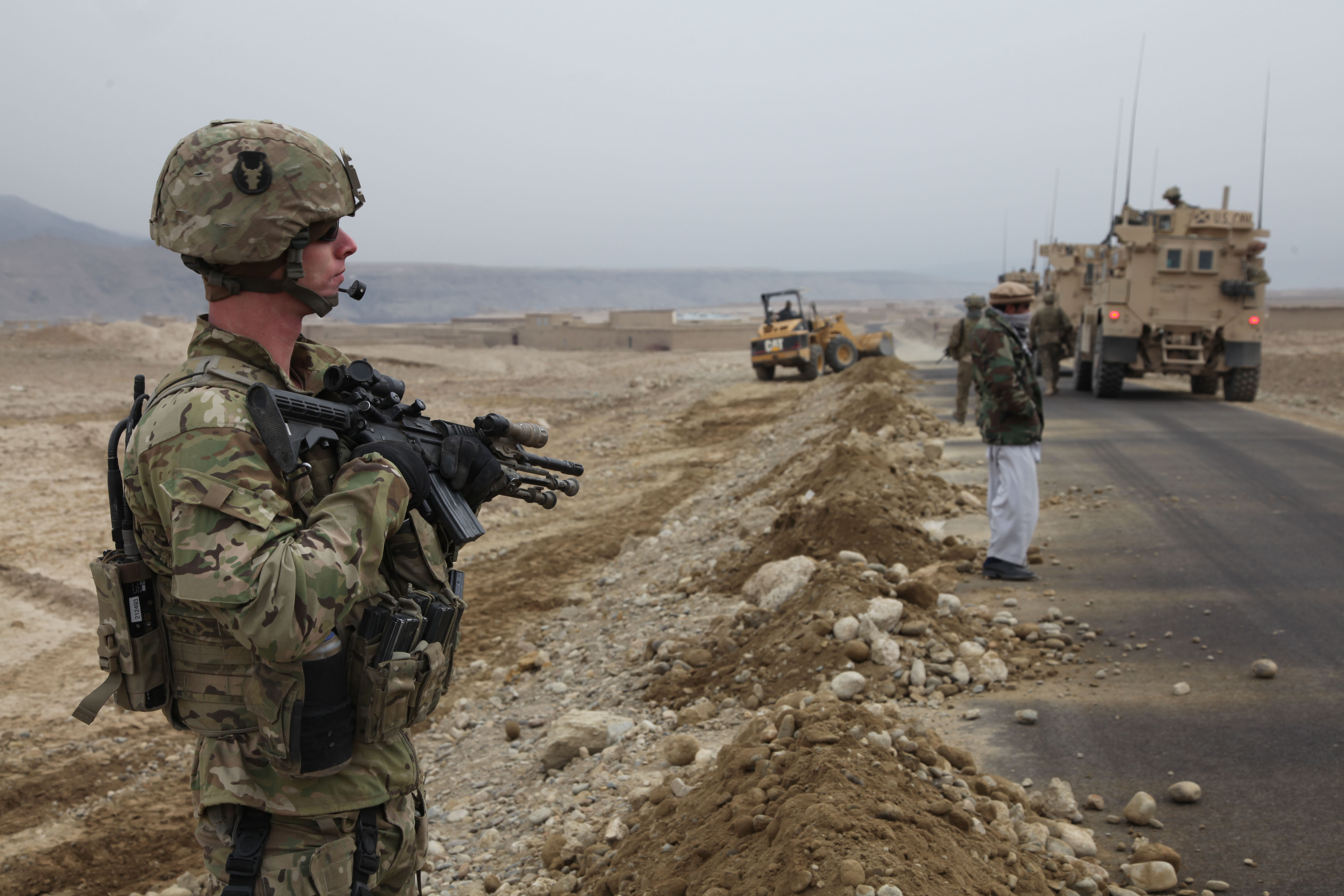
Trooper of the 1–113 Cavalry in Afghanistan, 2011

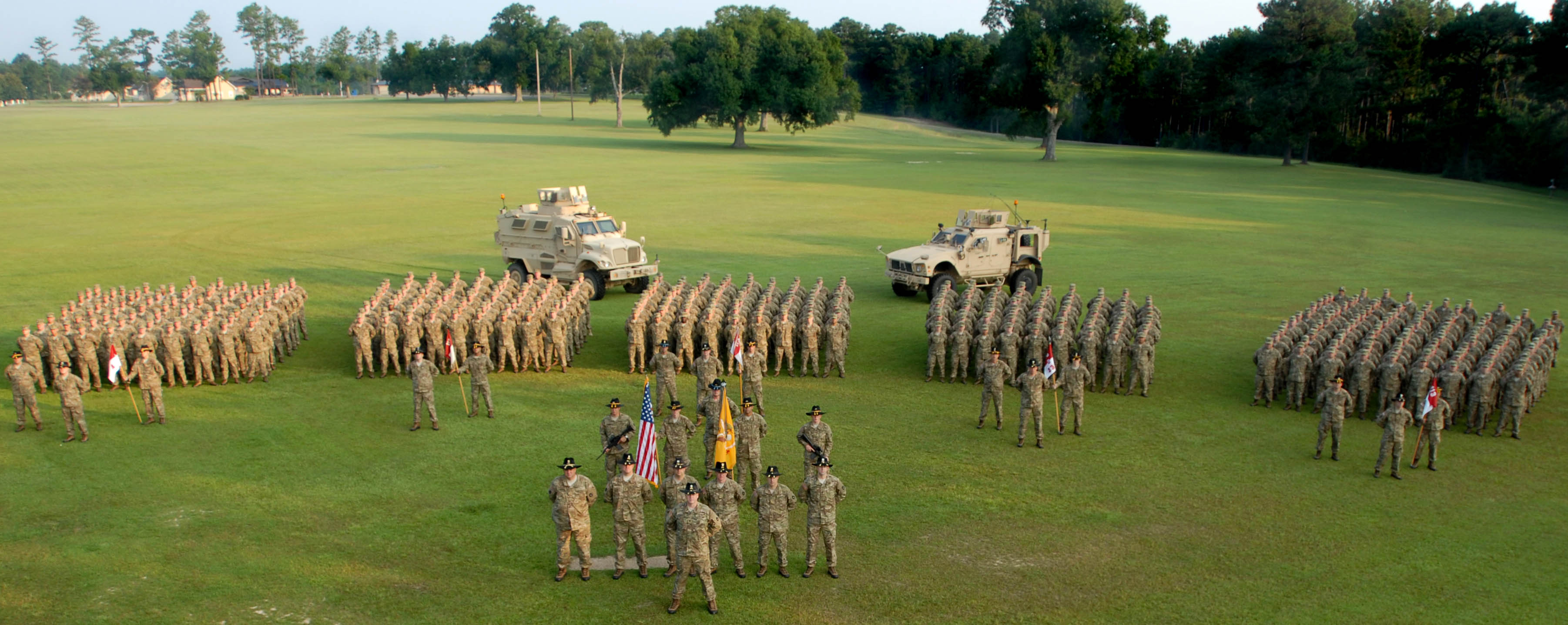
1-113th Cavalry, September 2010

=== 113th Cavalry (II) ===
On 4 May 1992, the 113th Cavalry was constituted and allotted to the Iowa National Guard. On 1 September, it was organized from the Iowa elements of the 194th Cavalry Regiment, namely Troop C at Le Mars and Troop D at Waterloo. The battle participation credits earned by National Guard units in Le Mars (Company K, 133rd Infantry Regiment) and Waterloo (Companies B and D, 133rd Infantry Regiment) during World War II entitled their descendants in the new 113th Cavalry to display battle honors for the Tunisia, Anzio, Naples-Foggia, Rome-Arno, North Apennines, and Po Valley campaigns. The new 113th Cavalry was also entrusted to display the battle honors of the former 113th Cavalry/113th Armor "as a challenge and a trust." The 1st Squadron, 113th Cavalry was reactivated on 11 September 1992, at ceremonies at Camp Dodge, Iowa. In 1996 the squadron was restructured for the next ten years with the Headquarters and Headquarters Troop (HHT) at Sioux City, Iowa, Troops A and B at Camp Dodge, Troop C at Le Mars, and Troops D, E and later Troop F at Waterloo. With the next reorganization, Troops D, E and F were detached when the 1-113th Cavalry reorganized into a RSTA (cavalry) and became an organic asset to the 2d Brigade Combat Team, 34th Infantry Division. It remains an active duty unit of the Iowa National Guard.

1-113th Cavalry is currently composed of a headquarters and headquarters troop, three line troops, and one support unit. Troops A and B drill at Camp Dodge, Iowa, and Troop C is headquartered in Le Mars, Iowa. The support unit, Company D, 334th Brigade Support Battalion (BSB), trains in Sioux City, along with the HHT, as well as a detachment from 2168th Transportation Company (TC). Troop C returned from Iraq in October 2006. Troop A deployed in June 2007, and the squadron as a whole, including Company D, 334th BSB, and the 2168th Transportation Company, deployed in November 2010 with the 2d Brigade Combat Team as part of Operation Enduring Freedom.

== Awards and decorations ==
=== Campaign credit ===
Conflict	Unit	Streamer	Notes
World War I	Squadron		Without Inscription
World War II	Squadron	Normandy	Normandy
World War II	Squadron	Northern France	Northern France
World War II	Squadron	Rhineland	The Rhineland
World War II	Squadron	Central Europe 1945	Central Europe
World War II	HHT & C Troop		Tunisia
World War II	HHT & C Troop		Anzio
World War II	HHT & C Troop		Naples-Foggia
World War II	HHT & C Troop		Rome-Arno
World War II	HHT & C Troop		North Apennines
World War II	HHT & C Troop		Po Valley
GWOT	Squadron		Operation Enduring Freedom; CONSOLIDATION III 2009–2011
GWOT	A Troop		Iraqi Surge
GWOT	C Troop		Iraqi Governance
GWOT	C Troop		National Governance

=== Unit Decorations ===
Unit	Streamer	Year	Notes
Squadron		Meritorious Unit Commendation; Streamer embroidered Afghanistan 2010–2011	None
Squadron		Superior Unit Award	2008
A Troop		Meritorious Unit Commendation; Streamer embroidered Iraq AUG 2007- APR 2008	None
C Troop		Meritorious Unit Commendation; Streamer embroidered Iraq 2005-2006	None
HHT & C Troop		French Croix de Guerre with Palm, World War II, Streamer embroidered BELVEDERE	None
Group		Belgian Fourragere Croix de Guerre 1940 -1945	1947

== See also ==
- 24th Cavalry Division (United States)
- List of armored and cavalry regiments of the United States Army
