= Calliope (instrument) =

Large, steam-powered musical instrument

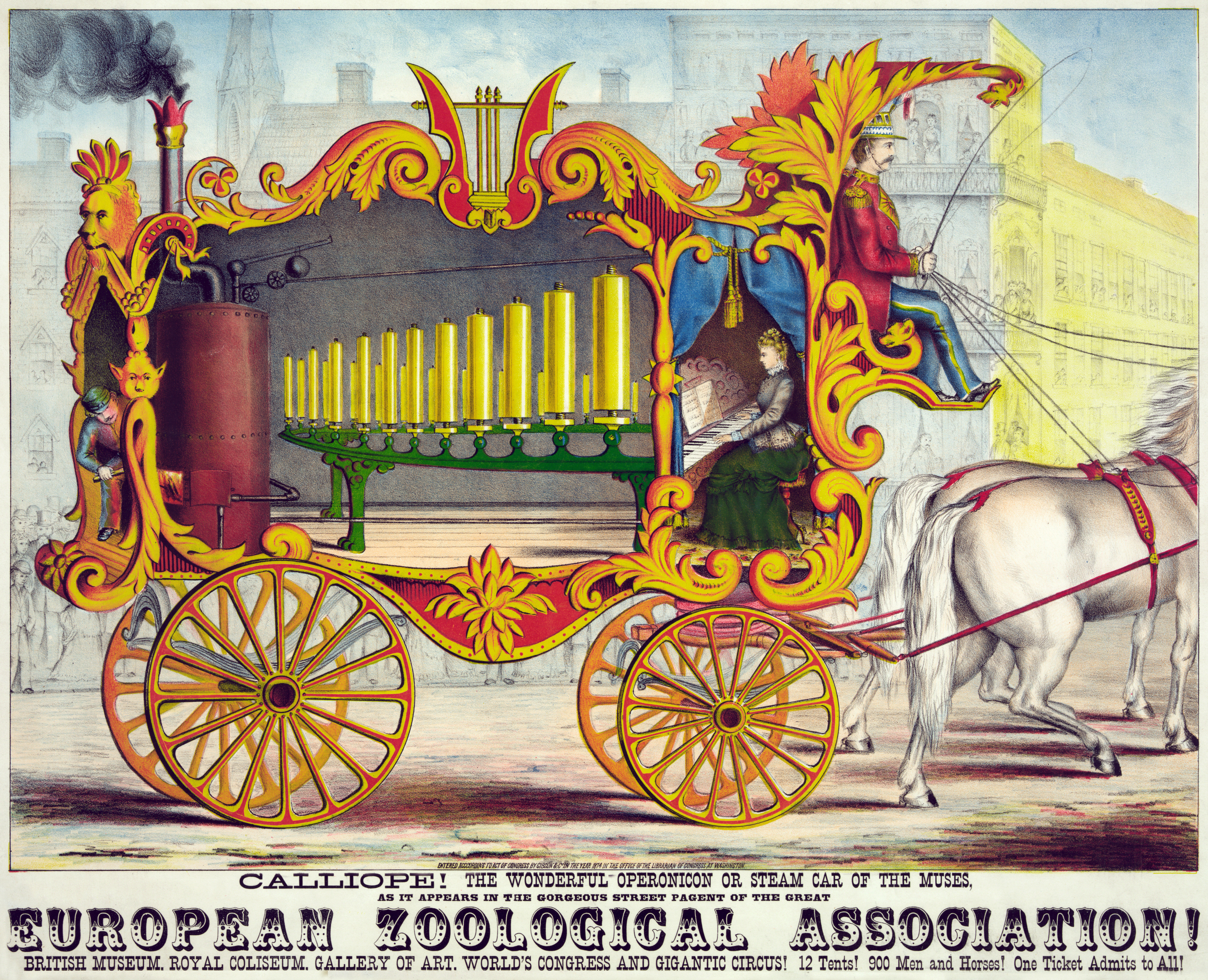
"Calliope, the wonderful operonicon or steam car of the muses" – advertising poster, 1874

'Margie'
Performed on the steam calliope of the
Str. Julia Belle Swain

A calliope (not to be confused with mechanical organs) (see below for pronunciation) is an American musical instrument that produces sound by sending a gas, originally steam or, more recently, compressed air, through large whistles—originally locomotive whistles.

A calliope is typically very loud. Even some small calliopes are audible for miles. There is no way to vary tone or volume. Musically, the only expression possible is the pitch, rhythm, and duration of the notes.

The steam calliope is also known as a steam organ (orgue à vapeur in Quebec) or steam piano (piano à vapeur in Quebec). The air-driven calliope is sometimes called a calliaphone, the name given to it by Norman Baker, but the "Calliaphone" name is registered by the Miner Company for instruments produced under the Tangley name.

In the age of steam, the steam calliope was particularly used on riverboats and in circuses. In both cases, a steam supply was readily available for other purposes. Riverboats supplied steam from their propulsion boilers. Circus calliopes were sometimes installed in steam-driven carousels, (Note: The calliope is confused by some with the air-powered orchestrion, which was also used to produce music on period carousels. It used organ pipes rather than steam whistles to produce its principal sounds. See also fairground organ.) or supplied with steam from a traction engine. The traction engine could also supply electric power for lighting, and tow the calliope in the circus parade, where it traditionally came last. Other circus calliopes were self-contained, mounted on a carved, painted and gilded wagon pulled by horses, but the presence of other steam boilers in the circus meant that fuel and expertise to run the boiler were readily available. Steam instruments often had keyboards made from brass. This was in part to resist the heat and moisture of the steam, but also for the golden shine of the highly polished keys.

Calliopes can be played by a player at a keyboard or mechanically. Many models of calliopes use roll operation. Some instruments have both a keyboard and a mechanism for automated operation, others only one or the other. Some calliopes can also be played via a MIDI interface.

The whistles of a calliope are tuned to a chromatic scale, although this process is difficult and must be repeated often to maintain quality sound. Since the pitch of each note is largely affected by the temperature of the steam, accurate tuning is nearly impossible; however, the off-pitch notes (particularly in the upper register) have become something of a trademark of the steam calliope. A calliope may have anywhere from 25 to 67 whistles, but 32 is traditional for a steam calliope.

== History ==
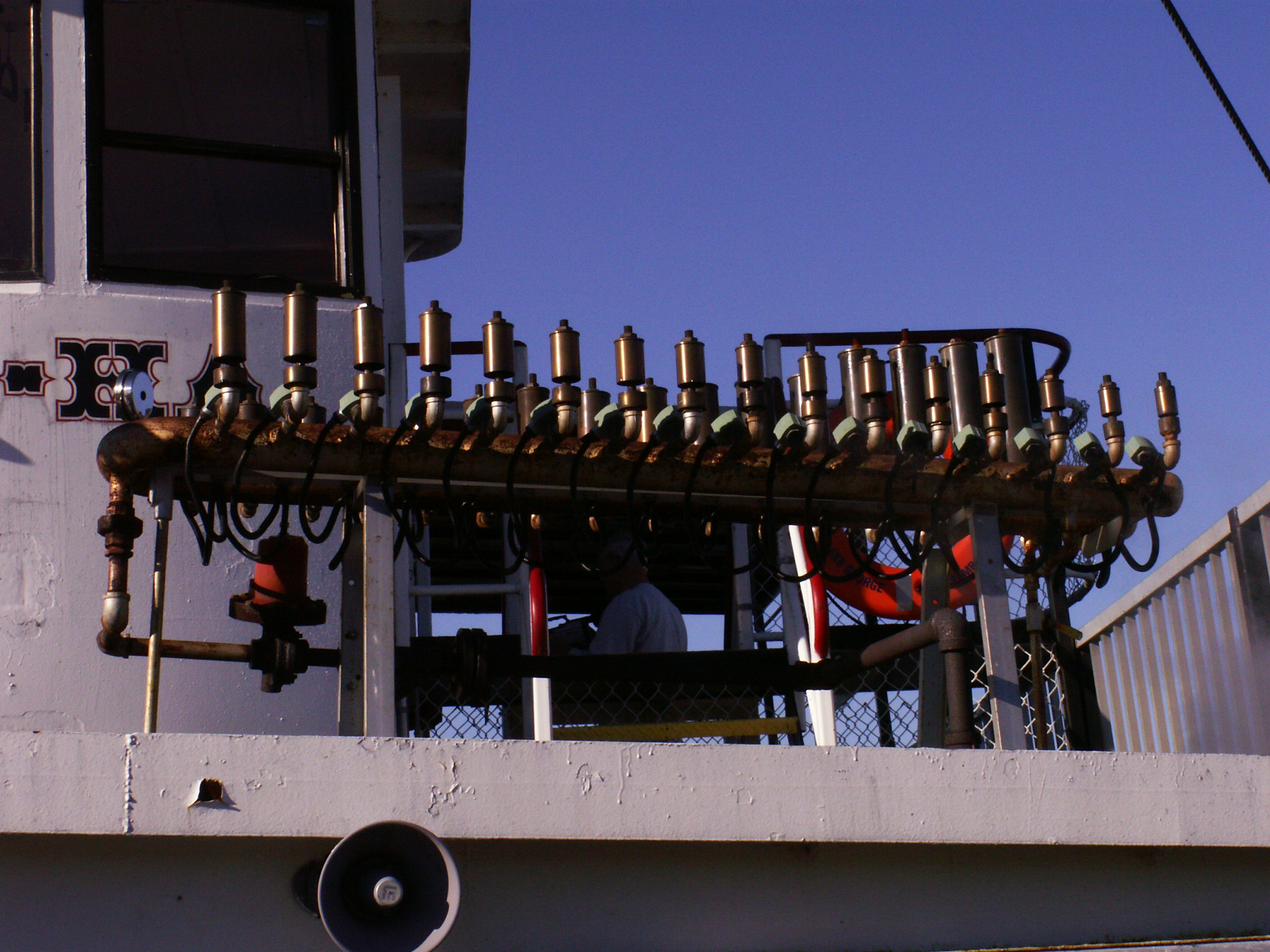
Calliope on the Minne-Ha-Ha, a stern-wheeler on Lake George, New York

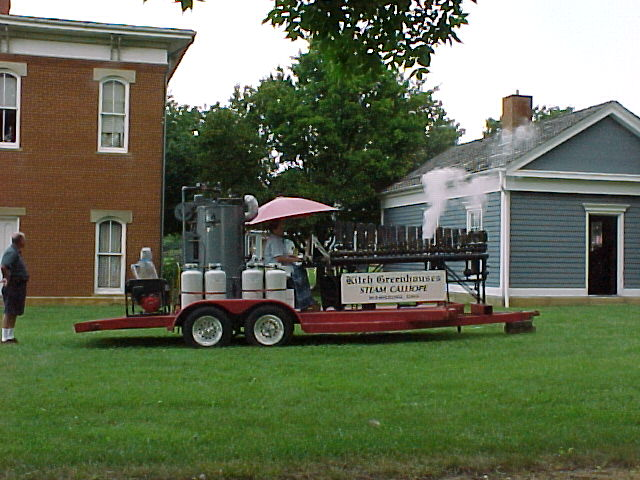
Kitch Greenhouse Steam Calliope at the Ohio Historical Society – July 2006

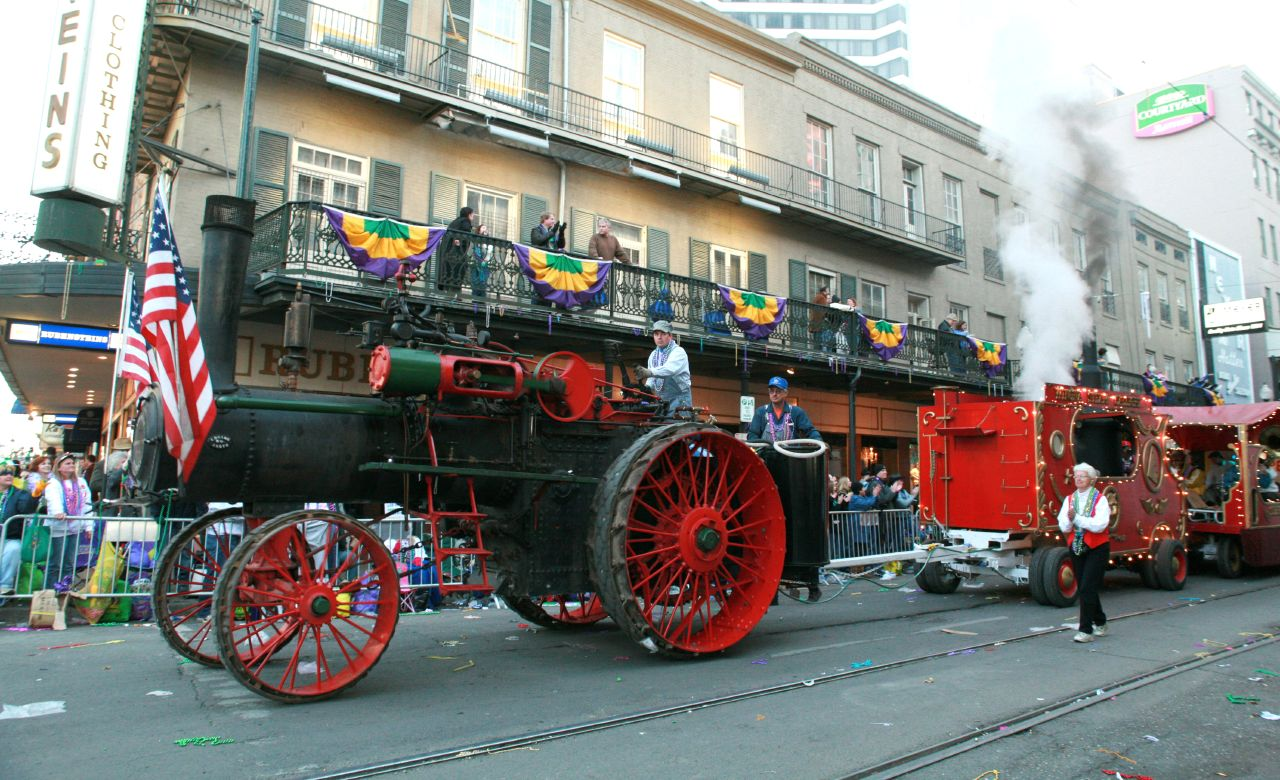
Fairground calliope trailer being hauled by a U.S.-built traction engine – New Orleans Mardi Gras 2007

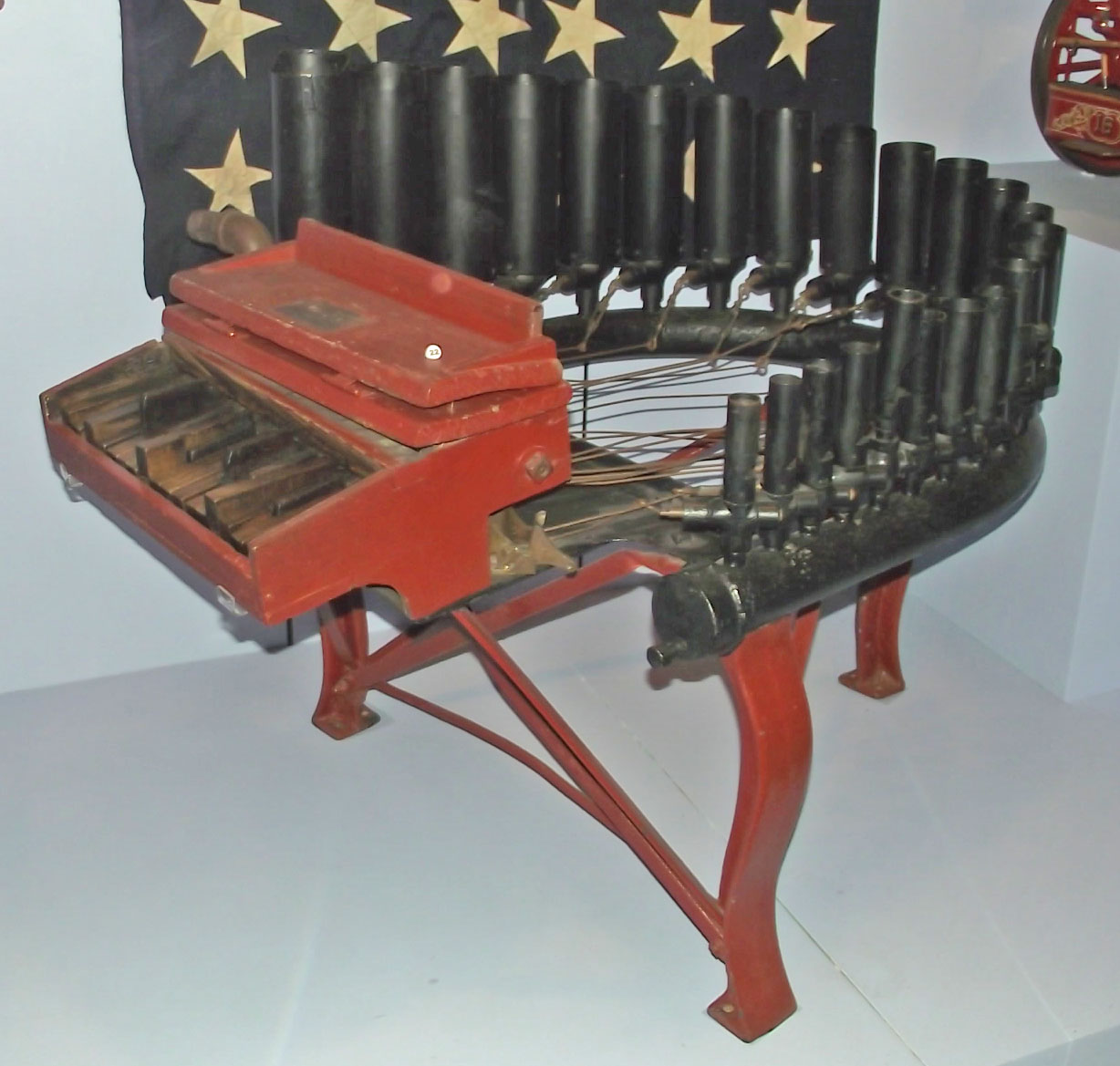
Steam calliope (c. 1901) built by George Kratz and used on the showboat French's New Sensation at The Mariners' Museum

Joshua C. Stoddard of Worcester, Massachusetts patented the calliope on October 9, 1855, though his design echoes previous concepts, such as an 1832 instrument called a steam trumpet, later known as a train whistle. In 1851, William Hoyt of Dupont, Indiana claimed to have conceived of a device similar to Stoddard's calliope, but he never patented it. Later, an employee of Stoddard's American Steam Music Company, Arthur S. Denny, attempted to market an "Improved Calliope" and a similar instrument called the "Aerophon" in Europe, but it did not catch on. In 1859, he demonstrated this instrument in Crystal Palace, London. Unlike other calliopes before or since, Denny's improved instrument let the player control the steam pressure, and therefore the volume of the music, while playing.

Stoddard originally intended the calliope to serve as a signaling device for railroads and coastal & river steamboats; a myth popularized in the 1950s claims that he invented it to replace carillons to call worshipers to church services. The instrument rapidly found its way onto riverboats during the paddlewheel era. While only a small number of working steamboats still exist, each has a steam calliope. These boats include the Delta Queen, the Belle of Louisville, and President. Their calliopes are played regularly on river excursions. Many surviving calliopes were built by Thomas J. Nichol, Cincinnati, Ohio, who built calliopes from 1890 until 1932. The Thomas J. Nichol calliopes featured rolled sheet copper (as used in roofing) for the resonant tube (the bell) of the whistle, lending a sweeter tone than cast bronze or brass, which were the usual materials for steam whistles of the day. David Morecraft pioneered a resurgence in the building of authentic steam calliopes of the Thomas J. Nichol style beginning in 1985 in Peru, Indiana. These calliopes are featured in Peru's annual Circus City Parade. Morecraft died on December 5, 2016.

Stoddard's original calliope was attached to a metal roller set with pins in the manner familiar to Stoddard from the contemporary clockwork music box. The pins on the roller opened valves that admitted steam into the whistles. Later, Stoddard replaced the cylinder with a keyboard, so that the calliope could be played like an organ.

Starting in the 1900s calliopes began using music rolls instead of a live musician. The music roll operated in a manner similar to a piano roll in a player piano, mechanically operating the keys. Many of these mechanical calliopes retained keyboards, allowing a live musician to play them if needed. During this period, compressed air began to replace steam as the vehicle of producing sound.

Most calliopes disappeared in the mid-20th century, as steam power was replaced with other power sources. Without the demand for technicians that mines and railroads supplied, no support was available to keep boilers running. Only a few calliopes have survived, which, unless converted to a modern power source, are rarely played.

A relatively recently built calliope is that of Carl Bergman of Aspen, Colorado, which was built in the mid 1970s. The 6 foot tall wood-fired steam boiler was originally used by miners at Independence Pass and requires its owner to maintain a boiler operator's license. The calliope produces 10 notes and takes 8 hours to get ready.

== Pronunciation ==
The pronunciation of the word has long been disputed, and often it is pronounced differently inside and outside the groups that use it. The Greek muse by the same name is pronounced /kəˈlaɪ.əpi/ kə-LY-ə-pee, but the instrument was usually pronounced /ˈkælioʊp/ KAL-ee-ohp by people who played it. A nineteenth-century magazine, Reedy's Mirror, attempted to settle the dispute by publishing this rhyme:

Proud folk stare after me,
Call me Calliope;
Tooting joy, tooting hope,
I am the calliope.

This, in turn, came from a poem by Vachel Lindsay, called "The Kallyope [sic] Yell", in which Lindsay uses both pronunciations.

In the song "Blinded by the Light", written in 1972, Bruce Springsteen used the four-syllable (/kəˈlaɪ.əpi/ kə-LY-ə-pee) pronunciation commonly used in the United States; this was also used by the British Manfred Mann's Earth Band in their 1976 cover.

== Related instruments ==
=== Pyrophone ===
The pyrophone is a calliope-like instrument that uses internal combustion within its whistles to power their notes, rather than the calliope's system of friction from steam going through ducts.

At 1998's Burning Man, a pyrophone referred to as Satan's Calliope was powered by ignition of propane inside resonant cavities.

=== Calliaphone ===
The calliaphone is a compressed-air powered, easily transported instrument developed by early 20th century American inventor Norman Baker.

=== Lustre chantant ===
The lustre chantant (literally "singing chandelier") or musical lamp was invented by Frederik Kastner. It was a large chandelier with glass pipes of varying lengths each illuminated and heated by an individual gas jet. A keyboard allowed the player to turn down individual jets; as the glass tube cooled, a note was produced. Kastner installed several such instruments in Paris.

== Popular culture ==
Henry Mancini used the calliope in his 1961 song "Baby Elephant Walk" for the film Hatari! to suggest the fun of a circus.

A calliope in a travelling circus plays an important role in Mission: Impossible season 1 (1966, episodes 4 and 5, Old Man Out). Its music serves as background for the diversionary circus stunts central to the episode's mission.

The Beatles, in recording "Being for the Benefit of Mr. Kite!" from the 1967 album Sgt. Pepper's Lonely Hearts Club Band, used tapes of calliope music to create the atmosphere of a circus. Beatles producer George Martin recalled, "When we first worked on 'Being for the Benefit of Mr. Kite!' John had said that he wanted to 'smell the sawdust on the floor', wanted to taste the atmosphere of the circus. I said to him, 'What we need is a calliope.' 'A what?' 'Steam whistles, played by a keyboard.'" Unable to find an authentic calliope, Martin resorted to tapes of calliopes playing Sousa marches. "[I] chopped the tapes up into small sections and had Geoff Emerick throw them up into the air, re-assembling them at random."

In the 1972 western film The Great Northfield, Minnesota Raid, which takes place in 1876, a calliope is featured prominently during a scene when Cole Younger (portrayed by Cliff Robertson) and his gang arrive in Northfield, Minnesota. The instrument is referred to by name and Younger shows such interest in it that he attempts to fix it.

In the Rusty Quill horror podcast The Magnus Archives, an antique calliope organ is prominently referenced and spoken about in MAG 24: Strange Music. The calliope is referenced as both the former and as a calliaphone, and the pronunciation of the word is discussed.

== See also ==
- Fairground organ
- Theater organ
- Orchestrion
- Showman's road locomotive
- Barrel organ
- T34 Calliope, a rocket launcher named after the instrument
