= XHK-TV =

- La Paz, Baja California Sur; Mexico
- Channels: Analog: 10; Digital: 34 (UHF) (never built)
- Branding: Canal 10

Programming
- Affiliations: Defunct

Ownership
- Owner: Televisión La Paz, S. A.

History
- First air date: June 3, 1968
- Last air date: December 31, 2015
- Call sign meaning: XH; King Television

Technical information
- ERP: 73.04 kW
- Transmitter coordinates: 24°10′54″N 110°17′51″W

Links
- Website: XHK

XHK-TV was a television station on channel 10 in La Paz, Baja California Sur, Mexico. It broadcast from facilities in Colina del Sol, on the east side of the city of La Paz, and was owned by Televisión La Paz, S.A.

== History ==
XHK was the first television station in Baja California Sur. It received its concession on May 30, 1968, and came to air on June 3. Broadcasting on channel 10 with an effective radiated power of 8,200 watts, XHK was a sister to XENT-AM 790, also owned by Francisco King Rondero and the first radio station in the territory, and the two stations formed the Radio and Television Center (Centro de Radio y Televisión).

XHK's local programs included news, sports, and lifestyle programs, as well as programming from Televisa (primarily through FOROtv and Gala TV) including international news and telenovelas. Local programming at the station's closure included its evening newscasts, El Pulso BCS, as well as A Medio Día, a local newsmagazine aired at midday.

Despite being authorized for digital television and obtaining technical approval to broadcast on channel 34 with 50 kilowatts, the station went off air with the analog shutdown on December 31, 2015. An SCT representative noted that the station was lacking in administrative, financial and technical capacity, but that XHK could return to the air in digital. Another issue casting their ability to resume transmissions into doubt is that the station had not paid employees for several pay periods, failing to pay Christmas bonuses, social security or savings fund contributions, and the union representing 28 of XHK's 40 employees was considering going on strike. Later that month, electrical service was shut off to the Canal 10 studios for nonpayment. It would not be until September that XHK would go into liquidation, selling off embargoed assets in order to raise funds to pay the station's employees.

In January 2017, the Radio and Television Center was demolished.
