= 133rd Infantry Regiment (United States) =

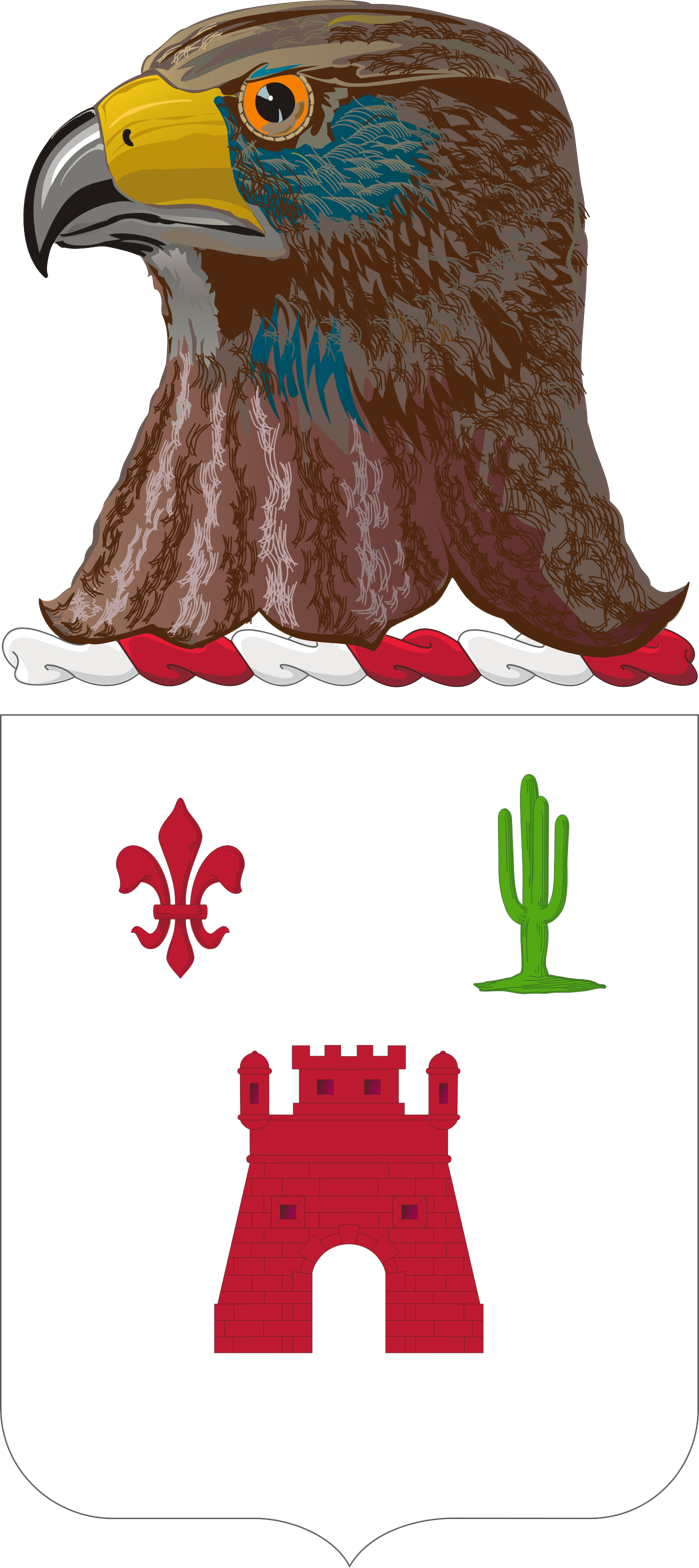
- Coat of arms
- Active: 1861–present
- Country: United States
- Allegiance: Iowa
- Branch: Iowa Army National Guard
- Type: Infantry
- Size: Regiment
- Nicknames: "First Iowa" (special designation) "Ironman"
- Motto: Avauncez (old French for "advance" or "forward")

Commanders
- Notable commanders: William H. Schildroth

Insignia
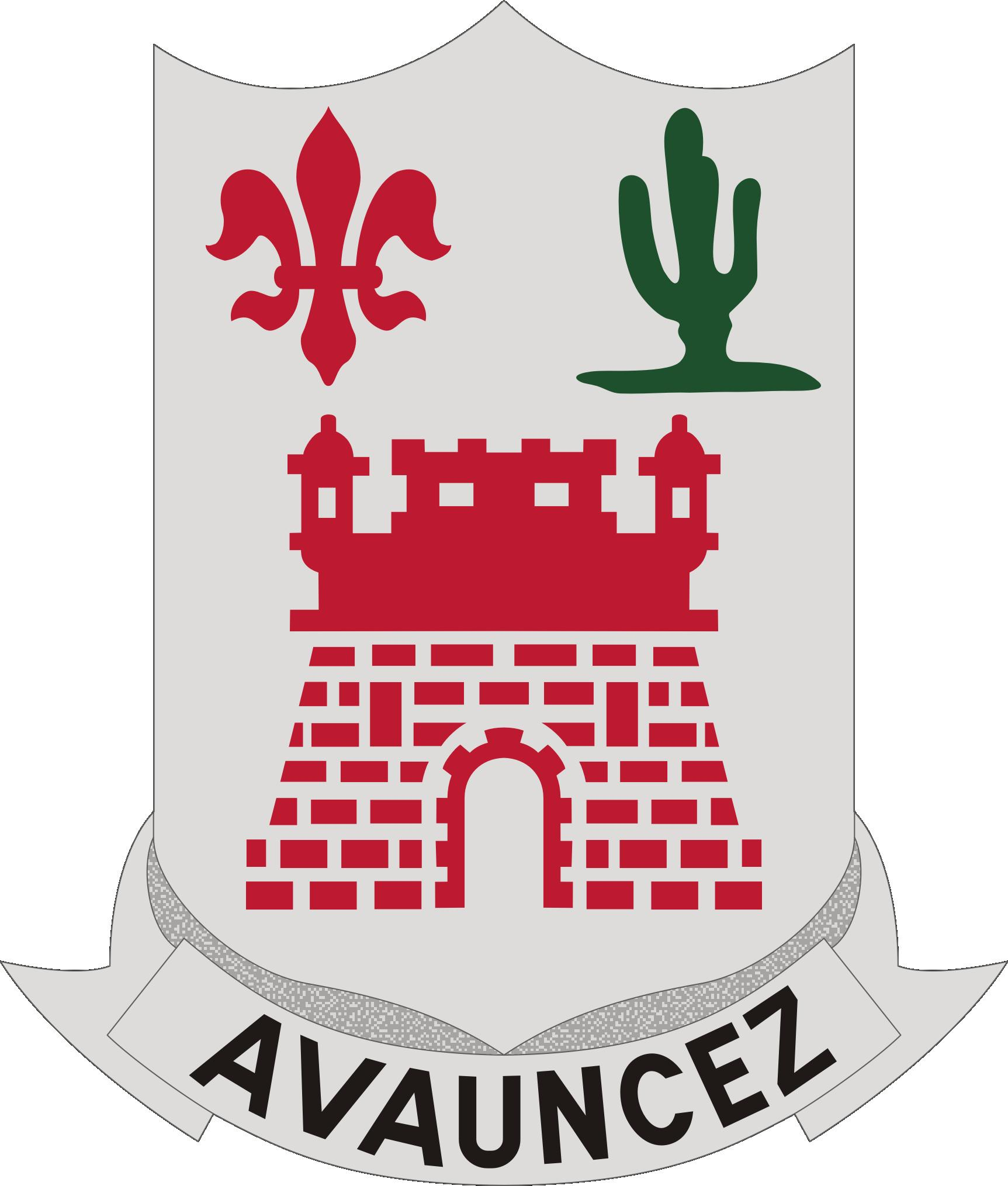
- DUI

The 133rd Infantry Regiment is an infantry regiment in the Iowa Army National Guard. It is represented by the 1st Battalion, 133rd Infantry Regiment, part of the 2nd Infantry Brigade Combat Team, 34th Infantry Division.

== History ==
=== Civil War ===
The 1st Battalion, 133rd Infantry Regiment was originally constituted and organized in May 1861 as an element of the 2nd Iowa Volunteer Infantry and mustered into federal service 27 May 1861. It was mustered out of federal service on 12 July 1865 at Louisville, Kentucky.

=== Mexican Expedition and World War I ===
The 2nd Iowa Volunteer Infantry was mustered again into federal service on 2 June 1916 at Camp Dodge, Iowa for the Mexican Border and stationed at Brownsville, Texas. The unit was again and mustered out of federal service on 15 January 1917 at Fort Des Moines, Iowa. Soon thereafter, the regiment was again called into federal service on 25 March 1917 and was drafted into federal service on 5 August 1917. It was reorganized and redesignated as the 133rd Infantry and assigned to the 34th Infantry Division on 1 October 1917.

=== Interwar period ===
The 133rd Infantry arrived at the port of New York on 24 January 1919 on the USS General G. W. Goethals, and was demobilized 18 February 1919 at Camp Grant, Illinois. It was reconstituted in the National Guard in 1921, assigned to the 34th Division, and allotted to the state of Iowa. It was reorganized on 11 July 1921 by redesignation of the 134th Infantry (organized and federally recognized on 21 June 1919 as the 4th Infantry, Iowa National Guard, with headquarters at Iowa City, Iowa; redesignated 134th Infantry on 29 March 1921) as the 133rd Infantry. The headquarters was successively relocated as follows: Des Moines, Iowa, in 1922; Sioux City, Iowa, 22 September 1927; and Waterloo, Iowa, 19 July 1940. The entire regiment was called up to perform the following state duties: riot control during the “Cow War” in Cedar County/Burlington, Iowa, 21 September–25 November 1931; riot control during a workers’ strike at the Swift Meat Packing Plant in Sioux City, Iowa, 19 October–21 November 1938. The regiment conducted annual summer training most years at Camp Dodge, Iowa, from 1921–39. For at least two years, in 1938 and 1940, the regiment also trained some eighteen company-grade infantry officers of the 89th Division at Camp Dodge and Camp Ripley, Minnesota.

=== World War II ===
The regiment was inducted into active federal service at home stations on 10 February 1941 and moved to Camp Claiborne, Louisiana, where it arrived on 1 March 1941. It was inactivated on 3 November 1945 at Camp Patrick Henry, Virginia. The regiment saw service in Italy in 1944 and 1945.

=== Cold War ===
The 133rd Infantry Regiment was reorganized and federally recognized on 25 November 1946 with headquarters at Cedar Falls, Iowa.

The unit was relieved from the 34th Infantry Division on 1 May 1959 and reorganized as a parent regiment under the Combat Arms Regimental System. The 1st Battalion, 133rd Infantry draws its lineage and honors from that of Company A, 133rd Infantry. Fearing a loss of federal revenue, Iowa Governor Norman A. Erbe and Adjutant General Junior Miller initially refused to comply with an April 1962 National Guard Bureau order to eliminate one of the three Iowa-stationed battle groups of the 34th Infantry Division under the ROAD reorganization.

Subsequent assignments for the 1st Battalion, 133rd Infantry included the 47th Infantry Division and the 34th Infantry Division. It joined the latter on 10 February 1991, becoming part of the division's 2nd Brigade (Air Assault). With the transformation of the 34th Infantry Division to the US Army's modular force structure and the reorganization and redesignation of 2nd Brigade (Air Assault), 34th Infantry Division as 2nd Brigade Combat Team, 34th Infantry Division, the unit became directly assigned to the new modular brigade combat team.

=== Modern ===
After completing six months of training at Camp Shelby, Mississippi, and a rotation through Joint Readiness Training Center in Fort Polk, Louisiana, the 1st Battalion, 133rd Infantry, made it safely into the Iraqi theater of operation. The outgoing unit, 1st Battalion, 118th Field Artillery, from Savannah, Georgia, validated the 1st Battalion, 133rd Infantry, as ready to take over the mission. The mission tasked to the 133rd Infantry Battalion was convoy security in the western region of the Iraqi theater of operations. The official take over of this mission occurred on 1 May 2006.

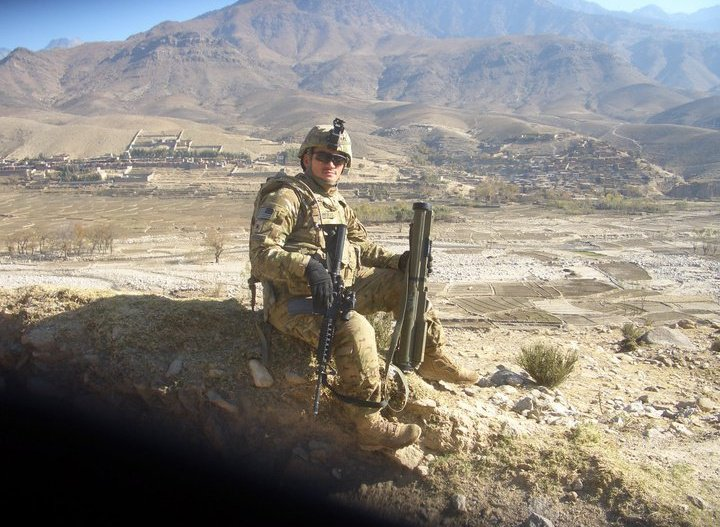
A soldier of Company A, 1-133 Infantry in Afghanistan, November 2010

Activated in August 2010 and mobilized out of Camp Shelby, Mississippi, the battalion completed a validation exercise at the National Training Center, Fort Irwin, CA, and was forward deployed to Laghman & Nuristan provinces in Afghanistan. Tasked with conducting Counterinsurgency in support of Unified Land Operations in Regional Command East, the 1-133 Infantry Battalion excelled at lethal and nonlethal targeting to secure the populace, civil-military operations to improve the infrastructure and education, and mentoring host nation forces for eventual hand off of security. After nine months in theatre, the 1-133 Infantry was relieved in place and reverted to state control in August 2011.

== Lineage ==
Organized in the Iowa volunteer militia during 1861 as follows:

- 2d Regiment organized 20 April – 6 May 1861 in southeastern Iowa as the 2nd Regiment, Iowa Volunteer Infantry
- 3d Regiment organized 18 May – 1 June 1861 in northeastern Iowa as the 3rd Regiment, Iowa Volunteer Infantry
- 2d and 3d Regiments, Iowa Volunteer Infantry, mustered into federal service 27–28 May and 8–10 June 1861, respectively, at Keokuk, Iowa
- 2d and 3d Regiments consolidated 4 November 1864 and consolidated unit designated as the 2d Regiment, Iowa Volunteer Infantry
- Mustered out of federal service 12 July 1865 at Louisville, Kentucky
- Reorganized 1876–1878 in Iowa as independent companies of volunteer militia

(Iowa State Militia redesignated 3 April 1878 as the Iowa National Guard)

- Companies in central Iowa consolidated 11 September 1879 to form the 8th Infantry Regiment
- Redesignated 1 October 1881 as the 1st Infantry Regiment
- Mustered into federal service 2 June 1898 at Des Moines as the 49th Iowa Volunteer Infantry;
- mustered out of federal service 13 May 1899 at Savannah, Georgia
- Reorganized 30 November 1902 in the Iowa National Guard as the 53d Infantry Regiment
- Redesignated 3 July 1915 as the 1st Infantry Regiment
- Mustered into federal service 26 June 1916 at Camp Dodge, Iowa; mustered out of federal service 15 January 1917 at Des Moines
- Called into federal service 25 March 1917; drafted into federal service 5 August 1917
- Reorganized and redesignated 1 October 1917 as the 133d Infantry and assigned to the 34th Division
- Demobilized 18 February 1919 at Camp Grant (Illinois)
- Former 1st Infantry consolidated with the 4th Infantry Regiment (organized 1918–1919 in the Iowa State Guard); consolidated unit reorganized and federally recognized 1 April 1921 in the Iowa National Guard as the 134th Infantry with headquarters at Des Moines
- Redesignated 11 July 1921 as the 133d Infantry and assigned to the 34th Division (later redesignated as the 34th Infantry Division)
- (Location of headquarters changed 22 September 1927 to Sioux City; on 19 July 1940 to Waterloo)
- Inducted into federal service 10 February 1941 at home stations
- Inactivated 3 November 1945 at Camp Patrick Henry, Virginia
- Reorganized and federally recognized 25 November 1946 in the Iowa National Guard as the 133d Infantry with headquarters at Cedar Falls
- Reorganized 1 May 1959 as a parent regiment under the Combat Arms Regimental System to consist of the 1st and 2d Battle Groups, elements of the 34th Infantry Division
- Reorganized 1 March 1963 to consist of the 1st Battle Group and the 2d Battalion
- Reorganized 1 March 1964 to consist of the 1st, 2d, and 3d Battalions
- Reorganized 1 January 1968 to consist of the 1st and 2d Battalions, elements of the 47th Infantry Division
- (2d Battalion ordered into active federal service 13 May 1968 at home stations; released from active federal service 13 December 1969 and reverted to state control).

Withdrawn 1 May 1989 from the Combat Arms Regimental System and reorganized under the United States Army Regimental System

- Reorganized 10 February 1991 to consist of the 1st and 2d Battalions, elements of the 34th Infantry Division
- Reorganized 1 September 1997 to consist of the 1st Battalion, an element of the 34th Infantry Division
- Ordered into active federal service 15 August 2003 at home stations; released from active federal service 9 May 2004 and reverted to state control
- Redesignated 1 October 2005 as the 133d Infantry Regiment
- Ordered into active federal service 5 October 2005 at home stations; released from active federal service 29 September 2007 and reverted to state control
- Ordered into active federal service 2 August 2010 at home stations; released from active federal service 1 August 2011 and reverted to state control

== Distinctive unit insignia ==
- Description

A Silver color metal and enamel device 1 1/8 inches (2.9 cm) in height overall consisting of a shield blazoned: Argent, a Spanish castle debased Gules, to chief a fleur-de-lis of the like and on a mount a giant cactus Vert. Attached below and to the sides of the shield is a Silver scroll inscribed "AVAUNCEZ" in Black letters.

- Symbolism

The shield is silver, or white, the old Infantry color. The Spanish castle, taken from the Spanish Campaign Medal, is used to represent military service outside the continental limits of the United States, while the cactus and fleur-de-lis are for Mexican Border and World War I service, respectively. The motto translates to "Advance, or Forward".

- Background

The distinctive unit insignia was approved on 16 August 1933.

== Coat of arms ==
- Blazon
  - Shield- Argent, a Spanish castle debased Gules, to chief a fleur-de-lis of the like and on a mount a giant cactus Vert.
  - Crest- That for the regiments and separate battalions of the Iowa Army National Guard: On a wreath of the colors Argent and Gules, a hawk's head erased Proper. Motto: AVAUNCEZ (Advance, or Forward).
- Symbolism
  - Shield- The shield is white, the old Infantry color. The Spanish castle, taken from the Spanish Campaign Medal, is used to represent military service outside the continental limits of the United States, while the cactus and fleur-de-lis are for Mexican Border and World War I service, respectively.
  - Crest- The crest is that of the Iowa Army National Guard.
- Background- The coat of arms was approved on 15 August 1933.

== Campaign streamers ==
Civil War

- Henry and Donelson
- Mississippi River
- Shiloh
- Vicksburg
- Atlanta
- Missouri 1861
- Tennessee 1862
- Mississippi 1862
- Mississippi 1863
- Georgia 1864

World War I

- Streamer without inscription

World War II

- Tunisia
- Naples–Foggia
- Anzio
- Rome–Arno
- North Apennines
- Po Valley

War on Terror

- Iraq:
- National Resolution
- Iraqi Surge
- Afghanistan

== Decorations ==
- Meritorious Unit Commendation (Army), Streamer embroidered: IRAQ 2006–2007, AFGHANISTAN 2010–2011.
- French Croix de Guerre with Palm, World War II, Streamer embroidered BELVEDERE.

Company A (Clinton), 1st Battalion, additionally entitled to:

- Presidential Unit Citation (Army), Streamer embroidered NORTHERN ITALY (1st Battalion, 133rd Infantry Regiment, 3–4 October 1944, WD GO 113, 1946)
