= XHNT-FM =

Radio station in La Paz, Baja California Sur

XHNT-FM/XENT-AM
- La Paz, Baja California Sur; Mexico
- Frequency: 790 kHz/97.5 MHz
- Branding: Radio Fórmula

Programming
- Format: News/Talk

Ownership
- Owner: Grupo Fórmula; (Transmisora Regional Radio Fórmula, S.A. de C.V.)

History
- First air date: 1956

Technical information
- Licensing authority: CRT
- Class: B1 (FM); B (AM)
- Power: (AM) 10 kWs daytime.75 kW (750 watts) nighttime
- ERP: (FM) 25 kW
- HAAT: 8.6 m (28 ft)
- Transmitter coordinates: 24°09′50″N 110°18′56″W

Links
- Website: radioformula.com.mx

XHNT-FM is the callsign of a radio station in La Paz, Baja California Sur, Mexico. XHNT broadcasts on 97.5 MHz and carries Radio Fórmula programming.

The station is also on AM as XENT-AM 790 kHz.

== History of the XENT call sign ==
XENT-AM were the call letters of a border-blaster radio station licensed to Nuevo Laredo, Tamaulipas. It operated nightly from 1933 to 1940 on 1140 kc/s with a power reported from 50 kW to 150 kW. In 1944–1945, XENT's transmitter was acquired by Alamo Broadcasting for use at KABC in San Antonio, in a contested action.

XENT was the continuation of KTNT ("Know The Naked Truth"), Norman G. Baker's station in Muscatine, Iowa, United States, as was forced off the air in 1931 for excessive self-promotion and want of candor. Baker was a notorious cancer quack, operating clinics in Muscatine and Eureka Springs, Arkansas, that were heavily promoted over KTNT and then XENT.

== In La Paz ==
The XENT callsign returned, this time to Baja California Sur, with the awarding to Radio La Paz, S.A., of a concession for XENT-AM on July 19, 1956. The station was operated by the King family, which would later start XHK-TV channel 10, and was the first radio station in Baja California Sur.

The station was sold to Radio Fórmula in the mid-2000s.
