= Norman G. Baker =

American radio broadcaster and quack (1882 - 1958)

- Born: November 27, 1882; Muscatine, Iowa, U.S.
- Died: September 10, 1958 (aged 75); Miami, Florida, U.S.
- Resting place: Greenwood Cemetery
- Other name: Charles Welch
- Occupations: Radio broadcaster and personality, inventor, entrepreneur

Norman G. Baker (November 27, 1882 – September 10, 1958) was a con man who secured fame as well as state and federal prison terms by promoting a false cure for cancer in the 1930s. He operated radio stations KTNT in Muscatine, Iowa and the border blaster XENT in Nuevo Laredo, Tamaulipas. Baker was also the creator of the Tangley calliaphone (an air blown musical instrument similar to a calliope).

== Early life ==
Baker was born to a wealthy family in the small Mississippi River town of Muscatine, Iowa. He was the tenth and last child of locally prominent parents. His father, John Baker, had reportedly patented 126 inventions, and his mother, Frances Mary (née Anshulz), was a writer before she married.

== Career ==
=== As inventor ===
Although Baker is usually described as having begun his career as a vaudeville performer, he showed early promise as an inventor and a machinist. Norman Baker invented and, through his Tangley Company, successfully manufactured and sold the Tangley Automatic Air Calliope or calliaphone, a variation of the then-common steam organ. This mobile, stentorian contrivance was much in demand for fairgrounds and circuses. Baker also formed numerous local businesses under the Tangley or Baker name. By 1904, Baker had become intrigued by travelling shows presenting "mentalists" and other vaudeville performers to the public. He set up his own troupe and, as "Charles Welch," travelled the country with it. A person of the show, regardless of his actual identity, remained the "mind-reader Pearl Tangley."

Along with various Tangley stores and a drawing school, Baker also published TNT magazine and later was the president of the Progressive Publishing Co., publisher of the daily Midwest Free Press. It was meant to undercut other newspapers which Baker asserted were part of the conspiracy against him. Baker also operated a traveling campaign bus equipped with a calliope, and he was in demand as a speaker for populist causes in the region. For example, he denounced mandated cattle TB tests, water fluoridation, vaccinations and also aluminum cookware, which he claimed caused half of all cancers.

In 1932, Baker organized the short-lived "United Farm Federation of America" and appointed himself a permanent honorary member and chairman, drawing a salary, which caused a lawsuit. However, the outfit showed up in important-sounding lobbying in Washington.

=== First radio station (KTNT) ===
In 1924, convinced of the potential of the burgeoning field of radio broadcasting, Baker asked the town of Muscatine to permit a station that would make the town famous across the Midwest. In operation by November 1925, the station received the call sign KTNT, chosen for its explosive connotations but explained as "Know The Naked Truth." It broadcast with 500 watts on 256.3 meters or 1170 kHz. It used the calliaphone for a sign-on signal, and Baker put his skills as a veteran carnival barker to exquisite use as a radio promoter and announcer. Baker immediately began agitating vociferously against an alleged "cartel" of broadcasters aimed at independent stations. This was before the broadcast spectrum was regulated, and the many new stations interfered frequently. By 1925, Baker was president of the American Broadcasters Association, a short-lived lobbying group (to 1927) against "monopolists." In particular, Baker railed against AT&T, which then (through Western Electric) had a de facto monopoly on radio station transmitters.

The station was deleted in June 1931. Among cited reasons were venomous, obscene broadcasts against the public interest.

=== First hospital ===
Having learned of an alleged cancer cure by Charles Ozias of Kansas City, and asserting its efficacy despite the expeditious deaths of all five of his test subjects, Baker brought the convicted medical swindler Harry Hoxsey to Muscatine and with him began promoting his own "cure." By April 1930, Norman Baker was operating the Baker Institute in Muscatine, and advertising the clinic on the air. The (very expensive) cure for cancer, and other diseases as requested, consisted of injections of a mix of common substances including corn silk, watermelon seeds, clover, water, and carbolic acid. Simultaneously, KTNT denounced licensed doctors as "educated fools" and "cutters" incapable of helping patients. Baker said MD stood for "More Dough." At that time, the Journal of the American Medical Association (known as JAMA) published an editorial accusing Baker of quackery. Baker denounced the AMA as the "Amateur Meat-cutters Association." The AMA's main antiquackist, Morris Fishbein, stated that "Baker has even claimed that the AMA offered him one million dollars for his cancer cure with the intent of forcing it from the market so that patients might be compelled to resort to surgery." In turn, Baker attacked Fishbein for being Jewish and sued JAMA for libel and defamation.

In 1930, Baker reported that three men attacked and fired on the hospital, but police could find no evidence except that Hoxsey, Baker's associate, had fired all shots. In May 1930, the state of Iowa filed for an injunction against Baker, Hoxsey, and three others, for practicing medicine without a license. In Muscatine, Baker conducted huge outside gathering with open-air "curing" of patients. These events drew tens of thousands, who were also urged to buy various Baker or Tangley products.

Throughout his life, Baker was involved in almost continuous litigation of various kinds, often libel suits against his detractors, real or imagined. The lawsuits deterred opponents and ensured a high media profile. He used his station to launch blistering attacks on innumerable commercial, media, and political groups, both locally and nationwide.

Iowa's trial of Baker et al. began in September 1930 and gained nationwide attention. Simultaneously, Baker was called before the Federal Radio Commission in Washington, D.C., to defend KTNT's license. Baker and Hoxsey turned on each other over the division of the profits from the hospital and filed several lawsuits against each other. Reportedly, the institute brought in as much as $100,000 a month, spirited away in suitcases under cover of night, but most went to Baker. Hoxsey was already a nationally known quack, traveling from state to state as the law pursued him.

In 1931, the Iowa Supreme Court sustained the injunction against Baker and his practice. Also, the FRC issued a damning report about KTNT, and after a court battle, Baker returned from Mexican exile in 1937 to serve one day in the Muscatine County jail and pay a $50 contempt of court fine that was appealed unsuccessfully to the U.S. Supreme Court.

=== Politics ===
Norman Baker ran for governor of Iowa on the Farmer-Labor ticket in 1932. He received only a few hundred votes, but the campaign kept him in the news and gave him yet another mouthpiece for his rants against local power structures. Baker's platform, to the extent it had coherence, followed tenets of prairie populism of the time – i.e., asserted that the common people were being exploited by monopolistic conspiracies in various guises. However, Baker also crusaded against local newspapers and other radio stations that reported on his activities.

In spring 1936, Baker returned to run for the Republican senatorial nomination and received a few thousand votes.

=== Second radio station (XENT) ===
In 1933, having been run out of Iowa, Baker obtained Mexican permission to operate XENT in Nuevo Laredo on the Rio Grande. This station was a so-called "border blaster" operating nightly on 1410 kHz, with a power variously reported at from 50 to 150 kilowatts, and outside the reach of the new U.S. Federal Communications Commission. This reportedly made XENT the most, or second-most, powerful station in North America. The station's chief objective was to promote Baker's alleged cancer cure. A Baker hospital operated in Nuevo Laredo, drawing the renewed ire of the AMA and local doctors.

Nightly, XENT broadcast an eclectic mix of decidedly low-brow entertainment. While most of this was music in the hillbilly style, a Baker tirade was usually included. Baker's targets were numerous and included anti-semitic and anti-Catholic rants. He was also said to broadcast live while having sex with his mistresses.

=== Second hospital ===
In 1937, in the spa and resort town of Eureka Springs, Arkansas, Baker found a city down on its luck. He bought a resort, the Crescent Hotel, which had previously been a haven for the rich but had fallen into disrepair due to the Depression. Baker converted the hotel into a hospital and treated thousands of desperate patients with his injections. The giant resort hospital opened in November. Reportedly, Baker accumulated hundreds of thousands of dollars which he kept in various safe deposits known only to him and his new accomplice, Thelma Yount. Postal inspectors claimed that the hospital cleared about $500,000 in one year.

Among several libel suits, in 1938, Baker sued RKO for $1.1 million after the March of Time newsreel had portrayed him as a quack.

=== Federal case and conviction ===
A first federal case against Baker in 1937 failed because the Appellate Court did not accept the prosecutorial argument that transporting recordings abroad to broadcast to the United States was a breach of the Brinkley Act, a provision included in the Communications Act of 1934.

As Arkansas was unable to close down the Baker Hospital (which had revitalized Eureka Springs' economy), the federal government brought charges against Norman Baker with seven counts of mail fraud. The case, opened in September 1939, was complicated by the fact that Baker had no formal post in the business, exercising control through proxies. However, despite appeals all the way to the U.S. Supreme Court, Baker was sentenced to four years of jail and $4,000 restitution. In January 1940, the court found Baker's cure a "pure hoax" and "utterly false" and jailed him pending appeals. Baker served his sentence at the United States Penitentiary in Leavenworth, Kansas, from May 1941 to July 1944. In January that year, the 8th Circuit Court of Appeals denied him early release.

While Baker and his associate, R.A. Bellows, served time at Leavenworth, Bellows sued his fellow inmate for breach of contract, as he said Baker had not paid him the $75,000 of profits to which he was entitled. Bellows (described by the tax court as an "ignorant country barber" until Baker hired him) died shortly thereafter while still incarcerated.

=== Dispute with Alamo Broadcasting ===
During Baker's imprisonment, XENT went silent and the Crescent Hotel closed. Thelma Yount, appointed head of XENT in Baker's absence, sold an option for its equipment to the Alamo Broadcasting Co. of Texas, then owned by Elliott Roosevelt, the son of President Franklin D. Roosevelt, and his second wife Ruth Josephine. The Roosevelts could not obtain U.S. gear due to the wartime freeze on such uses. However, in April 1944, Alamo applied for and quickly received highly unusual permission from the FCC to upgrade its KABC in San Antonio from 250 to 50,000 watts (10,000 watts night), using XENT's relocated transmitters and masts. This vastly increased the value of the Alamo and Ruth Roosevelt's Texas State Network.

Mexico had an export ban on radio gear, but it could be overridden in certain circumstances, which turned out to include the Alamo's payment of $35,000 to the Mexican Minister of Communications. On October 31, 1944, Alamo bought XENT for $100,000. However, in February, Norman Baker intervened with the President of Mexico and was able to partially stop the transaction. In March 1945, XENT was trucked to San Antonio except for the generators and masts. Despite Baker's injunction, he said: "as the result of well-known tricks, artifices, and devices common to the Mexican border, said trucks did move across the bridge approximately 30 minutes before" the papers arrived.

Baker filed a complaint against Alamo with the FCC in late 1945. Baker asserted that the Roosevelts had engineered the transaction behind his back, and had, through direct access to President Roosevelt, secured the FCC's permit therefore. Baker and Yount had a falling out, each accusing the other of fraud. The case received some attention due to the newspaper columns of Westbrook Pegler, a fierce enemy of the Roosevelts; Pegler asserted that the FCC had been influenced to make Ruth Roosevelt wealthy at Baker's expense. The FCC denied Baker's claim in April 1947. The FCC asserted that Baker had initially approved the transaction, having been told that Alamo could secure a federal pardon for him, which Baker later discovered not to be forthcoming.

== Later years and death ==
In 1946, Norman Baker attempted to return to "healing" by establishing a research foundation in Muscatine for the purpose, but the state of Iowa refused permission "in the public interest."

Baker retired in ostentatious comfort to Miami, Florida, where he died on September 10, 1958, of cirrhosis. At the time of his death, he was living aboard a large yacht that was once owned by railroad developer Jay Gould. Baker is buried in Greenwood Cemetery in Muscatine next to his sister.

In his heyday, Baker was known for wearing white suits, purple shirts, and lavender ties, as well as driving an orchid-colored car. Others (Fowler) have the suits lavender, the shirts orchid, and the ties and vehicles purple; there is agreement that variations of purple were Baker's trademark. When he bought the Victorian and Neo-Classical Crescent Hotel, he decorated its interior with these colors. Baker was described as very handsome, with wavy white hair and "hypnotic" eyes; he was said to have been one of the greatest showmen who ever lived. He was also reported to always have one or more submachine guns within his reach (when not in jail).

Baker published two books about himself and his "crusade for humanity." He had a hagiography written about himself in 1934: Doctors, Dynamiters, and Gunmen, by Alvin Winston – "the most important book ever written."

== Legacy ==
Norman Baker was not the only suspect "radio doctor" of his era but is remembered by the medical profession as one of the most ruthless quacks in American history. As with Harry Hoxsey, he always had defenders who believed in his stories about the conspiracies of mainstream medicine to suppress his "cure". He was quoted as saying that if he had his station back, he could "reap one million dollars out of the suckers in the state."

Baker's radio case ran parallel to that of John R. Brinkley's Kansas station KFKB, known popularly as the "goat-gland station." Brinkley (and Hoxsey) also moved to Mexico to evade the law. As such, while quacks have always existed, the case is of continuing interest as an early example of the almost unregulated use of new mass-communications technologies.

The Baker cases with the FCC further was an early illustration of the delicate interplay of censorship and regulation, and of the early controversies of international radio spectrum allocations. Because medicine falls under U.S. regulatory oversight, but religion does not, scholars hold that the "radio doctor" phenomenon, when throttled, gave rise to the phenomenon of religious broadcasting; as well, Baker's broadcasting can be seen as a precursor to modern "shock-jock" radio.
