= Boone Municipal Airport =

Airport in Iowa, United States

- IATA: BNW; ICAO: KBNW; FAA LID: BNW

Summary
- Airport type: Public
- Owner: City of Boone
- Serves: Boone, Iowa
- Elevation AMSL: 1,160 ft (350 m)
- Coordinates: 42°02′58″N 093°50′51″W
- Website: BooneAirport.com

Map
- Location of airport in Iowa/United States BNW (the United States)

Runways
Direction	Length		Surface
Direction	ft	m	Surface
15/33	4,808	1,465	Concrete
2/20	3,248	990	Turf

Statistics (2012)
- Aircraft operations: 20,700
- Based aircraft: 37
- Source: Federal Aviation Administration

Boone Municipal Airport (IATA: BNW, ICAO: KBNW, FAA LID: BNW) is a city-owned public-use airport located two nautical miles (4 km) southeast of the central business district of Boone, a city in Boone County, Iowa, United States. It is included in the National Plan of Integrated Airport Systems for 2011–2015, which categorized it as a general aviation facility.

== Facilities and aircraft ==
Boone Municipal Airport covers an area of 206 acres (83 ha) at an elevation of 1,160 feet (354 m) above mean sea level. It has two runways: 15/33 is 4,808 by 75 feet (1,465 x 23 m) with a concrete surface and 2/20 is 3,248 by 146 feet (990 x 45 m) with a turf surface.

For the 12-month period ending September 28, 2012, the airport had 20,700 aircraft operations, an average of 56 per day: 56% general aviation and 44% military. At that time there were 37 aircraft based at this airport: 76% single-engine, 16% military, 3% multi-engine, 3% glider, and 3% ultralight.

== See also ==
- List of airports in Iowa
