= List of Minnesota National Guard Units =

This is a list of Minnesota National Guard Units.

== Minnesota Army National Guard Units ==
=== Joint Force Headquarters ===
- Joint Force Headquarters-Minnesota
  - Headquarters and Headquarters Detachment, Joint Force Headquarters
  - Minnesota Recruiting & Retention Battalion, in Minneapolis
  - Minnesota Medical Detachment, in Cottage Grove
  - Cyber Protection Team 177, in Rosemount
  - Camp Ripley Training Center, in Little Falls
    - Training Support Unit, at Camp Ripley
  - Army Aviation Support Facility #1, at Holman Field
  - Army Aviation Support Facility #2, at St. Cloud Airport
  - Combined Support Maintenance Shop #1, at Camp Ripley
  - Field Maintenance Shop #1, in Rosemount
  - Field Maintenance Shop #4, in Willmar
  - Field Maintenance Shop #5, in Detroit Lakes
  - Field Maintenance Shop #6, in New Ulm
  - Field Maintenance Shop #7, in Appleton
  - Field Maintenance Shop #13, in Cloquet
  - 175th Regiment, Regional Training Institute, at Camp Ripley
    - 1st Battalion (Officer Candidate School), at Camp Ripley
    - 2nd Battalion (Modular Training), at Camp Ripley
    - Regional Training Site-Maintenance, at Camp Ripley

=== 34th Infantry Division ===
- 34th Infantry Division, in Arden Hills
  - Headquarters and Headquarters Battalion, 34th Infantry Division, in Arden Hills
    - Headquarters Support Company, 34th Infantry Division, in Arden Hills
    - Company A (Operations), Headquarters and Headquarters Battalion, 34th Infantry Division, in Arden Hills
    - Company B (Intelligence and Sustainment), Headquarters and Headquarters Battalion, 34th Infantry Division, in Arden Hills
    - Company C (Signal), Headquarters and Headquarters Battalion, 34th Infantry Division, in Faribault
    - 34th Infantry Division Band, in Rosemount
  - 1st Armored Brigade Combat Team, 34th Infantry Division, in Rosemount
    - Headquarters and Headquarters Company, 1st Armored Brigade Combat Team, 34th Infantry Division, in Rosemount
    - 1st Squadron, 94th Cavalry Regiment, in Duluth
      - Headquarters and Headquarters Troop, 1st Squadron, 94th Cavalry Regiment, in Duluth
      - Troop A, 1st Squadron, 94th Cavalry Regiment, in Hibbing
      - Troop B, 1st Squadron, 94th Cavalry Regiment, in Pine City
      - Troop C, 1st Squadron, 94th Cavalry Regiment, in Cloquet
      - Troop D (Tank), 1st Squadron, 94th Cavalry Regiment, in Grand Rapids
    - 1st Battalion, 145th Armor Regiment, in Stow (OH) — (Ohio Army National Guard)
    - 1st Battalion, 194th Armor Regiment, in Brainerd
      - Headquarters and Headquarters Company, 1st Battalion, 194th Armor Regiment, in Brainerd
      - Company A (Tank), 1st Battalion, 194th Armor Regiment, in Sauk Centre
      - Company B (Tank), 1st Battalion, 194th Armor Regiment, in St. Cloud
      - Company C (Mechanized Infantry), 1st Battalion, 194th Armor Regiment, in East Saint Paul
    - 2nd Battalion, 136th Infantry Regiment, in Moorhead
      - Headquarters and Headquarters Company, 2nd Battalion, 136th Infantry Regiment, in Moorhead
        - Detachment 1, Headquarters and Headquarters Company, 2nd Battalion, 136th Infantry Regiment, in Fergus Falls
      - Company A (Mechanized Infantry), 2nd Battalion, 136th Infantry Regiment, in Bemidji
        - Detachment 1, Company A (Mechanized Infantry), 2nd Battalion, 136th Infantry Regiment, in Detroit Lakes
      - Company B (Mechanized Infantry), 2nd Battalion, 136th Infantry Regiment, in Crookston
        - Detachment 1, Company B (Mechanized Infantry), 2nd Battalion, 136th Infantry Regiment, in Thief River Falls
      - Company C (Tank), 2nd Battalion, 136th Infantry Regiment, in Wadena
    - 1st Battalion, 125th Field Artillery Regiment, in New Ulm
      - Headquarters and Headquarters Battery, 1st Battalion, 125th Field Artillery Regiment, in New Ulm
        - Detachment 1, Headquarters and Headquarters Battery, 1st Battalion, 125th Field Artillery Regiment, in Anoka
        - Detachment 2, Headquarters and Headquarters Battery, 1st Battalion, 125th Field Artillery Regiment, in Stow (OH) — (Ohio Army National Guard)
      - Battery A, 1st Battalion, 125th Field Artillery Regiment, in Pipestone
        - Detachment 1, Battery A, 1st Battalion, 125th Field Artillery Regiment, in Luverne
      - Battery B, 1st Battalion, 125th Field Artillery Regiment, in Jackson
      - Battery C, 1st Battalion, 125th Field Artillery Regiment, in Fairmont
    - 334th Brigade Engineer Battalion, in Stillwater
      - Headquarters and Headquarters Company, 334th Brigade Engineer Battalion, in Stillwater
      - Company A (Combat Engineer), 334th Brigade Engineer Battalion, in Hutchinson
      - Company B (Engineer Support), 334th Brigade Engineer Battalion, in Litchfield
      - Company C (Signal), 334th Brigade Engineer Battalion, in Rosemount
      - Company D (Military Intelligence), 334th Brigade Engineer Battalion, in Stillwater
    - 134th Brigade Support Battalion, at Camp Ripley
      - Headquarters and Headquarters Company, 134th Brigade Support Battalion, at Camp Ripley
      - Company A (Distribution), 134th Brigade Support Battalion, in Brooklyn Park
      - Company B (Maintenance), 134th Brigade Support Battalion, at Camp Ripley
      - Company C (Medical), 134th Brigade Support Battalion, in Cottage Grove
      - Company D (Forward Support), 134th Brigade Support Battalion, in Duluth — attached to 1st Squadron, 94th Cavalry Regiment
      - Company E (Forward Support), 134th Brigade Support Battalion, in Inver Grove Heights — attached to 334th Brigade Engineer Battalion
      - Company F (Forward Support), 134th Brigade Support Battalion, in St. Peter — attached to 1st Battalion, 125th Field Artillery Regiment
        - Detachment 1, Company F (Forward Support), 134th Brigade Support Battalion, in St. James
      - Company G (Forward Support), 134th Brigade Support Battalion, at Camp Ripley — attached to 1st Battalion, 194th Armor Regiment
      - Company H (Forward Support), 134th Brigade Support Battalion, in Stow (OH) — attached to 1st Battalion, 145th Armor Regiment (Ohio Army National Guard)
      - Company I (Forward Support), 134th Brigade Support Battalion, at Camp Ripley — attached to 2nd Battalion, 136th Infantry Regiment
  - 2nd Infantry Brigade Combat Team, 34th Infantry Division, in Boone (IA) — (Iowa Army National Guard)
    - 2nd Battalion, 135th Infantry Regiment, in Mankato
      - Headquarters and Headquarters Company, 2nd Battalion, 135th Infantry Regiment, in Mankato
        - Detachment 1, Headquarters and Headquarters Company, 2nd Battalion, 135th Infantry Regiment, in Owatonna
        - Detachment 3, Headquarters and Headquarters Battery, 1st Battalion, 194th Field Artillery Regiment, in Owatonna
      - Company A, 2nd Battalion, 135th Infantry Regiment, in West St. Paul
      - Company B, 2nd Battalion, 135th Infantry Regiment, in Rochester
      - Company C, 2nd Battalion, 135th Infantry Regiment, in Winona
      - Company D (Weapons), 2nd Battalion, 135th Infantry Regiment, in Albert Lea
      - Company I (Forward Support), 334th Brigade Support Battalion, in Arden Hills
  - 30th Armored Brigade Combat Team, in Clinton (NC) — (North Carolina Army National Guard)
  - 116th Cavalry Brigade Combat Team, in Boise (ID) — (Idaho Army National Guard)
  - 34th Division Artillery, in Arden Hills
    - Headquarters and Headquarters Battery, 34th Division Artillery, in Arden Hills
    - 1st Battalion, 151st Field Artillery Regiment, in Montevideo (M109A6 Paladin) (part of 115th Field Artillery Brigade)
      - Headquarters and Headquarters Battery, 1st Battalion, 151st Field Artillery Regiment, in Montevideo
      - Battery A, 1st Battalion, 151st Field Artillery Regiment, in Marshall
      - Battery B, 1st Battalion, 151st Field Artillery Regiment, in Madison
      - Battery C, 1st Battalion, 151st Field Artillery Regiment, in Ortonville
      - 175th Forward Support Company, in Appleton
        - Detachment 1, 175th Forward Support Company, in Morris
      - Battery C, 1st Battalion, 194th Field Artillery Regiment, in Alexandria (part of 2nd Infantry Brigade Combat Team, 34th Infantry Division)
  - 34th Combat Aviation Brigade, at Holman Field
    - Headquarters and Headquarters Company, 34th Combat Aviation Brigade, at Holman Field
      - 2nd Battalion (Assault), 147th Aviation Regiment, at Holman Field
        - Headquarters and Headquarters Company, 2nd Battalion (Assault), 147th Aviation Regiment, at Holman Field
          - Detachment 1, Headquarters and Headquarters Company, 2nd Battalion (Assault), 147th Aviation Regiment, at Capital City Airport (KY) — (Kentucky Army National Guard)
          - Detachment 2, Headquarters and Headquarters Company, 2nd Battalion (Assault), 147th Aviation Regiment, at Boone Airport (IA) — (Iowa Army National Guard)
        - Company A, 2nd Battalion (Assault), 147th Aviation Regiment, at Holman Field (UH-60M Black Hawk)
        - Company B, 2nd Battalion (Assault), 147th Aviation Regiment, at Capital City Airport (KY) (UH-60M Black Hawk) — (Kentucky Army National Guard)
        - Company C, 2nd Battalion (Assault), 147th Aviation Regiment, at Boone Airport (IA) (UH-60M Black Hawk) — (Iowa Army National Guard)
        - Company D (AVUM), 2nd Battalion (Assault), 147th Aviation Regiment, at Holman Field
          - Detachment 1, Company D (AVUM), 2nd Battalion (Assault), 147th Aviation Regiment, at Capital City Airport (KY) — (Kentucky Army National Guard)
          - Detachment 2, Company D (AVUM), 2nd Battalion (Assault), 147th Aviation Regiment, at Boone Airport (IA) — (Iowa Army National Guard)
        - Company E (Forward Support), 2nd Battalion (Assault), 147th Aviation Regiment, at Holman Field
          - Detachment 1, Company E (Forward Support), 2nd Battalion (Assault), 147th Aviation Regiment, at Capital City Airport (KY) — (Kentucky Army National Guard)
          - Detachment 2, Company E (Forward Support), 2nd Battalion (Assault), 147th Aviation Regiment, at Boone Airport (IA) — (Iowa Army National Guard)
      - 1st Battalion (Attack Reconnaissance), 151st Aviation Regiment, at McEntire Joint National Guard Base (SC) — (South Carolina Army National Guard)
      - 1st Battalion (Assault), 183rd Aviation Regiment, at Gowen Field (ID) — (Idaho Army National Guard)
      - 1st Battalion (General Support Aviation), 189th Aviation Regiment, at Helena Army Airfield (MT) — (Montana Army National Guard)
        - Company F (ATS), 1st Battalion (General Support Aviation), 189th Aviation Regiment, at Camp Ripley
      - 834th Aviation Support Battalion, in Arden Hills
        - Headquarters Support Company, 834th Aviation Support Battalion, at Arden Hills
        - Company A (Distribution), 834th Aviation Support Battalion, in Arden Hills
        - Company B (AVIM), 834th Aviation Support Battalion, at Tulsa Airport (OK) — (Oklahoma Army National Guard)
          - Detachment 1, Company B (AVIM), 834th Aviation Support Battalion, at Holman Field
          - Detachment 2, Company B (AVIM), 834th Aviation Support Battalion, at Esler Airfield (LA) — (Louisiana Army National Guard)
          - Detachment 3, Company B (AVIM), 834th Aviation Support Battalion, at Cheyenne Airport (WY) — (Wyoming Army National Guard)
          - Detachment 4, Company B (AVIM), 834th Aviation Support Battalion, at Helena Army Airfield (MT) — (Montana Army National Guard)
        - Company C (Signal), 834th Aviation Support Battalion, in Arden Hills
      - Detachment 1, Company B (Heavy Lift), 1st Battalion (General Support Aviation), 171st Aviation Regiment, at St. Cloud Airport (CH-47F Chinook)
        - Detachment 5, Company D (AVUM), 1st Battalion (General Support Aviation), 171st Aviation Regiment, at St. Cloud Airport
        - Detachment 5, Company E (Forward Support), 1st Battalion (General Support Aviation), 171st Aviation Regiment, at St. Cloud Airport
      - Company C (MEDEVAC), 2nd Battalion (General Support Aviation), 211th Aviation Regiment, at St. Cloud Airport (HH-60L Black Hawk)
        - Detachment 2, Headquarters and Headquarters Company, 2nd Battalion (General Support Aviation), 211th Aviation Regiment, at St. Cloud Airport
        - Detachment 2, Company D (AVUM), 2nd Battalion (General Support Aviation), 211th Aviation Regiment, at St. Cloud Airport
        - Detachment 2, Company E (Forward Support), 2nd Battalion (General Support Aviation), 211th Aviation Regiment, at St. Cloud Airport
      - Detachment 5, Company B, 2nd Battalion (Fixed Wing), 245th Aviation Regiment (Detachment 39, Operational Support Airlift Activity), at Holman Field (C-26E Metroliner)
  - 34th Division Sustainment Brigade, in Chicago (IL) — (Illinois Army National Guard)

Aviation unit abbreviations: MEDEVAC — Medical evacuation; AVUM — Aviation Unit Maintenance; AVIM — Aviation Intermediate Maintenance; ATS — Air Traffic Service

=== 84th Troop Command ===
- 84th Troop Command, in Cambridge
  - Headquarters and Headquarters Company, 84th Troop Command, in Cambridge
  - 34th Military Police Company (Combat Support), in Stillwater
  - 55th Civil Support Team (WMD), in Saint Paul
  - 257th Military Police Company (Detention), in Monticello
  - 682nd Engineer Battalion in St. Cloud
    - Headquarters and Headquarters Company, 682nd Engineer Battalion, in St. Cloud
    - Forward Support Company, 682nd Engineer Battalion, in Willmar
    - 434th Chemical Company, in Hastings
    - 434th Engineer Detachment (Fire Fighting Team — Fire Truck), at Camp Ripley
      - Detachment 1, 434th Chemical Company, in Red Wing
    - 850th Engineer Company (Engineer Construction Company), in Cambridge
    - 851st Engineer Company (Vertical Construction Company), at Camp Ripley

=== 347th Regional Support Group ===
- 347th Regional Support Group, in Brooklyn Park
  - Headquarters and Headquarters Company, 347th Regional Support Group, in Brooklyn Park
  - 147th Human Resources Company, in Arden Hills
  - 147th Financial Management Support Detachment, in Brooklyn Park
  - 204th Medical Company (Area Support), in Cottage Grove
  - 224th Transportation Company (Light-Medium Truck), in Austin
  - 247th Financial Management Support Detachment, in Arden Hills
  - 324th Transportation Company (Light-Medium Truck), in Olivia
    - Detachment 1, 324th Transportation Company (Light-Medium Truck), in Redwood Falls
  - 434th Ordnance Company (Support Maintenance), at Camp Ripley
  - 1903rd Support Detachment (Contracting Team), at Camp Ripley
  - 1904th Support Detachment (Contracting Team), at Camp Ripley
  - 1347th Division Sustainment Support Battalion, in Bloomington (part of 34th Division Sustainment Brigade)
    - Headquarters and Headquarters Company, 1347th Division Sustainment Support Battalion, in Bloomington
    - Company A (Composite Supply Company), 1347th Division Sustainment Support Battalion, in Fairfield (IA) — (Iowa Army National Guard)
      - Detachment 1, Company A, 1347th Division Sustainment Support Battalion, in Dubuque (IA) — (Iowa Army National Guard)
      - Detachment 2, Company A, 1347th Division Sustainment Support Battalion, in Clinton (IA) — (Iowa Army National Guard)
    - Company B (Support Maintenance Company), 1347th Division Sustainment Support Battalion, in Knoxville (IA) — (Iowa Army National Guard)
      - Detachment 1, Company B, 1347th Division Sustainment Support Battalion, in Oskaloosa (IA) — (Iowa Army National Guard)
    - Company C (Composite Truck Company), 1347th Division Sustainment Support Battalion, in Duluth
      - Detachment 1, Company C, 1347th Division Sustainment Support Battalion, in Chisholm

== Minnesota Air National Guard Units ==
=== 133rd Airlift Wing ===
- 133rd Airlift Wing, at Minneapolis–Saint Paul Joint Air Reserve Station
  - 133rd Airlift Wing Headquarters
    - Plans and Programs
    - Chaplain Section
    - Comptroller Flight
    - Inspector General Office
    - Judge Advocate General
    - Military Equal Opportunity Office
    - Public Affairs
    - Wing Safety
    - Director of Psychological Health
    - Sexual Assault Response Coordinator
  - 133rd Mission Support Group
    - 133rd Civil Engineering Squadron
    - 133rd Communications Flight
    - 133rd Force Support Squadron
    - 133rd Logistics Readiness Squadron
    - 133rd Security Forces Squadron
    - 210th Engineering Installation Squadron
  - 133rd Operations Group
    - 109th Airlift Squadron, with C-130H Hercules
    - 109th Aeromedical Evacuation Squadron
    - 133rd Operations Support Squadron
    - 208th Weather Flight
    - Contingency Response Flight
  - 133rd Maintenance Group
    - 133rd Aircraft Maintenance Squadron
    - 133rd Maintenance Squadron
    - 133rd Maintenance Operations Flight
    - Quality Assurance
  - 133rd Medical Group
    - Aerospace Medicine
    - Medical Services
    - Dental Services
    - Health Services
    - Nursing Services
    - Medical Detachment 1 (Chemical, Biological, Radiological, Nuclear Enhanced Response Force — CERF)

=== 148th Fighter Wing ===
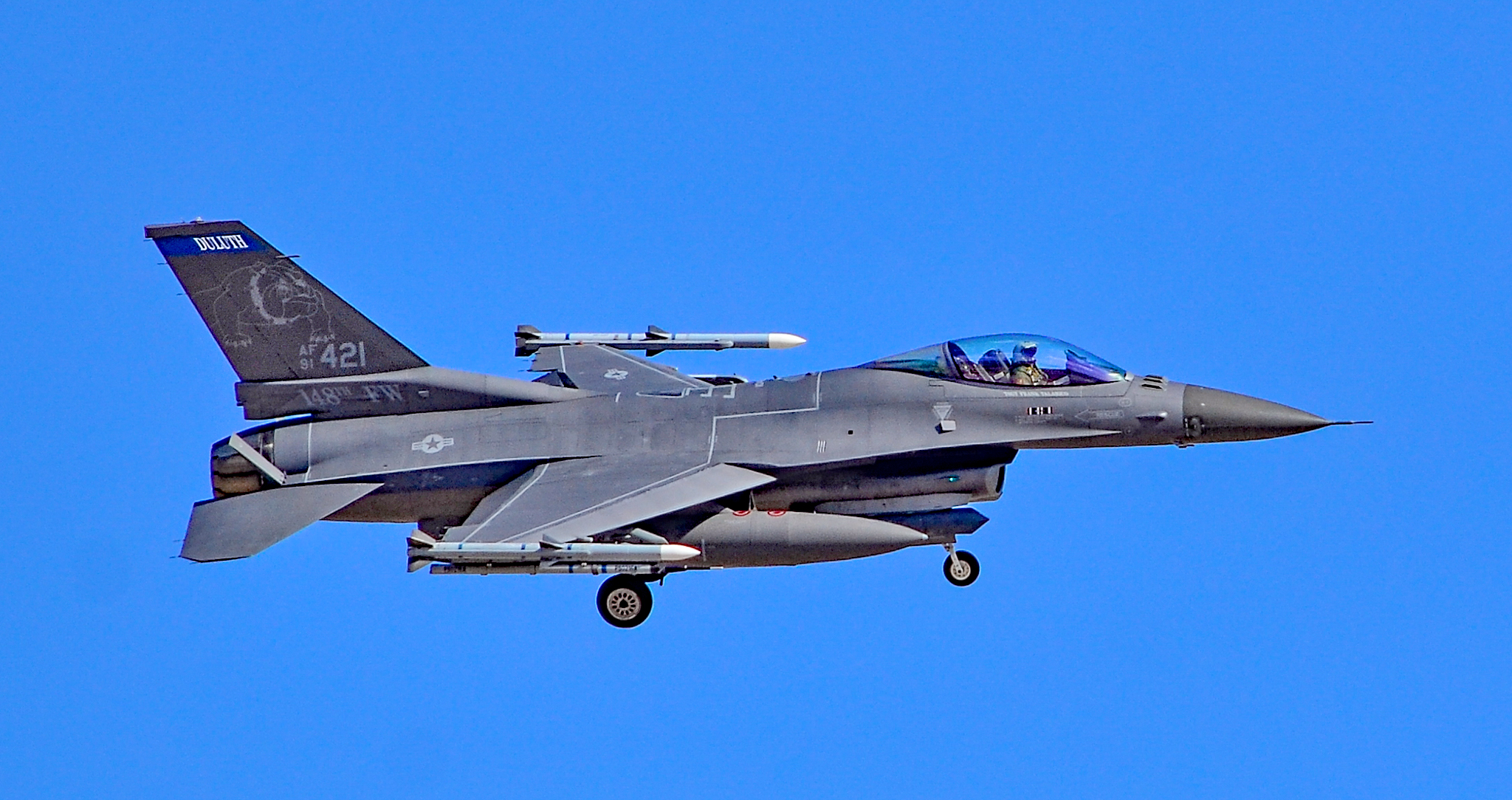
148th Fighter Wing F-16CM Block 50 Fighting Falcon in flight

- 148th Fighter Wing, at Duluth Air National Guard Base
  - 148th Fighter Wing Headquarters
    - Command Post
    - Chaplain Section
    - Comptroller Flight
    - Information Protection
    - Inspector General
    - Judge Advocate General
    - Military Equal Opportunity
    - Public Affairs
    - Wing Safety
  - 148th Mission Support Group
    - 148th Civil Engineering Squadron
    - 148th Communications Flight
    - 148th Force Support Squadron
    - 148th Logistics Readiness Squadron
    - 148th Security Forces Squadron
  - 148th Operations Group
    - 179th Fighter Squadron, with F-16CM Block 50 Fighting Falcon
    - 148th Operations Support Squadron
  - 148th Maintenance Group
    - 148th Aircraft Maintenance Squadron
    - 148th Maintenance Squadron
    - 148th Maintenance Operations Flight
  - 148th Medical Group
    - 148th Bio Environmental
    - 148th Medical Administration
    - 148th Nursing Services
    - 148th Public Health

== See also ==
- Minnesota Army National Guard
