= 84th Troop Command =

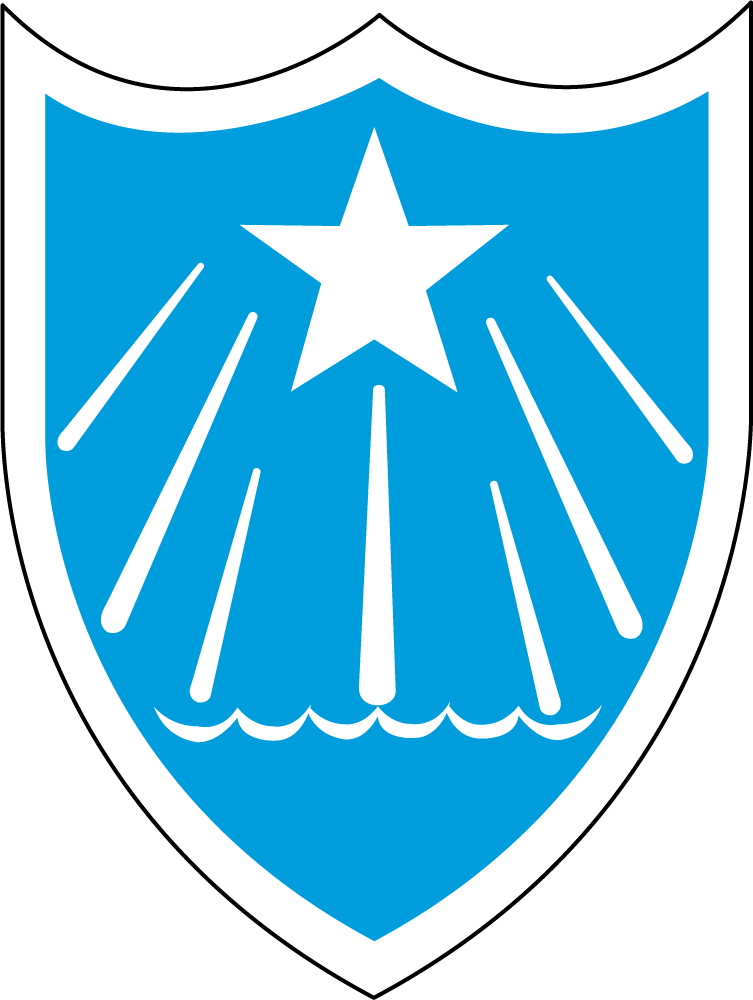
- Country: United States
- Branch: United States Army National Guard
- Role: Support
- Size: Group (Brigade)
- Part of: Minnesota Army National Guard
- Garrison/HQ: Cambridge, Minn.
- Website: https://mn.gov/mnng/units/84-troop-command/

Commanders
- Current commander: COL John McRae
- Command Sergeant Major: CSM Christian Hudson

Insignia
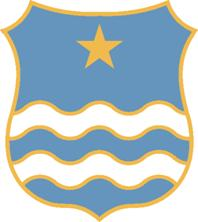
- 84th Troop Command Insignia

The 84th Troop Command, headquartered in Cambridge, Minnesota, oversees a wide variety of units, including field artillery, military police, engineer, and civil support forces; a force of approximately 2,000 soldiers. Much of this Minnesota National Guard unit’s stateside mission is to provide chemical, biological, radiological, and nuclear response capabilities to the state. The 84th also maintains a Quick Reaction Force and a National Guard Reaction Force in support of the governor.

== Units ==
Main article.

- Joint Force Headquarters-Minnesota
  - 84th Troop Command, in Cambridge
    - Headquarters and Headquarters Company, 84th Troop Command, in Cambridge
    - 34th Military Police Company (Combat Support), in Stillwater
    - 55th Civil Support Team (WMD), in Saint Paul
    - 257th Military Police Company (Detention), in Monticello
    - 682nd Engineer Battalion in St. Cloud
      - Headquarters and Headquarters Company, 682nd Engineer Battalion, in St. Cloud
      - Forward Support Company, 682nd Engineer Battalion, in Willmar
      - 434th Chemical Company, in Hastings
      - 434th Engineer Detachment (Fire Fighting Team — Fire Truck), at Camp Ripley
        - Detachment 1, 434th Chemical Company, in Red Wing
      - 850th Engineer Company (Engineer Construction Company), in Cambridge
      - 851st Engineer Company (Vertical Construction Company), at Camp Ripley

== History ==
In 2011, the 682nd conducted major construction missions at Camp Ripley and in West Virginia. They also trained with Croatian engineers in Croatia. The 151st upgraded to the new M777A2 Howitzers. 2011AR

In 2013, the 257th MPs returned from Afghanistan.

In 2014, the 849th and 850th returned from deployment to Afghanistan.

In 2015, the 84th moved its headquarters from Minneapolis to Cambridge. The 682nd Engineer Battalion supported civilian operations against the avian influenza.

In 2016, the 682nd returned from Operation Spartan Shield in Kuwait. The 851st Vertical Engineer Company’s annual training supported the Minnesota National Guard’s State Partnership Program with Croatia.

In 2018, 84TC assisted with security at Super Bowl LII in Minneapolis. The 851st Vertical Engineer Company conducted engineer missions in the Kuwait area.

In 2019, the 851st Vertical Engineer Company returned from Operation Spartan Shield in Kuwait. The 34th MP Company hosted the Norwegian Reciprocal Troop Exchange at Camp Ripley.

In 2020, the 34th MP Company deployed to Guantánamo Bay. The 257th MP Company deployed five times as the National Guard Quick Reaction Force.

In 2021, 84TC deployed 390 soldiers to protect the state capitol during the presidential inauguration. 1,200 soldiers were activated to support Operation Safety Net. The 434th Chemical Company deployed to Operation Spartan Shield in Kuwait. The 257th MP deployed within the state in response to civil unrest. The 34th MPs were identified as the best MP unit in the US Army for the second year in a row.

In 2022, the 34th MP Company provided security for the Kim Potter trial. The 151st Field Artillery provided nursing assistance in long-term care facilities during staffing shortages and also staffed COVID-19 testing sites.

== Leaders ==
Commanders
- COL John McRae, 2025 – present
- LTC Matthew Jukkala, 2023 – 2024
- COL Scott Rohweder, 2020 – 2022
- COL Brian H. Pfarr, 2017 – 2019
- COL Troy J. Soukup, 2014 – 2017
- COL Dirk R. Kloss, 2012 – 2014
- COL William J. Lieder, 2010
- COL Larry W. Shellito, 1995 - 1997
- COL David Lueck, ca. 1981 – 1985

.

Command Sergeants Major
- CSM Christian Hudson, 2025 – present
- CSM Katie Blackwell, 2022 – 2024
- CSM George R. Jensen, 2019 – 2021
- CSM Stephen Whitehead, 2017 – 2019
- CSM Rollyn M. Wold, 2012 – 2014
- CSM Sean L. McGuire
- CSM Richard W. Osborne
- CSM Douglas L. Julin, 1997 – 1998
