= United States Army National Guard Regional Training Institute =

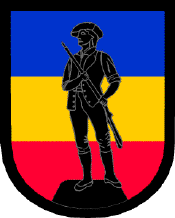
US Army National Guard Regional Training Institute Shoulder Sleeve Insignia

United States Army National Guard Regional Training Institutes are units that were created beginning in 2011 to provide training to National Guard, US Army Reserve and active duty soldiers including Officers Candidate School, Military Occupational Specialty Qualification training, Warrant Officer Candidate training, marksmanship training, Best Warrior Competitions and re-certification qualification as a part of the One Army School System.

== Regional Training Institutes (RTIs) ==
- Alabama - 200th Regiment Regional Training Institute, Fort McClellan Training Center
- Arizona - 215th Regional Training Institute, Phoenix
- Arkansas - 233rd Regional Training Institute, Camp Robinson
- California - 223rd Regional Training Institute, San Luis Obispo
- Colorado - 168th Regional Training Institute, Fort Carson
- Connecticut - 169th Regional Training Institute, Camp Nett
- Delaware - 193rd Regional Training Institute, Bethany Beach Training Site
- Florida - 211th Regional Training Institute, Camp Blanding Joint Training Center
- Georgia - 122nd Regional Training Institute, Clay National Guard Center
- Hawaii - 298th Multi-Function Training Regiment, Waimanalo
- Idaho - 204th Regional Training Regiment, Boise
- Illinois - 129th Regional Training Institute, Camp Lincoln
- Indiana - 138th Regiment (Combat Arms) Regional Training Institute, Camp Atterbury
- Iowa - 185th RTI - Iowa Regional Training Institute, Camp Dodge
- Kansas - 235th Kansas Regional Training Institute, Salina
- Kentucky - 238th Regiment Training Institute, Greenville
- Louisiana - 199th Louisiana Army National Guard Regional Training Institute, Minden
- Maine - 240th Regional Training Institute, Bangor
- Maryland - 70th Regiment Regional Training Institute, Aberdeen Proving Ground
- Massachusetts - 101st Regiment Regional Training Institute, Camp Edwards
- Michigan - 177th Regiment Regional Training Institute, Fort Custer Training Center
- Minnesota - 175th Regiment (Regional Training Institute), Camp Ripley
- Mississippi - 154th Regiment Regional Training Institute, Camp Shelby
- Missouri - 140th Regional Training Institute, Fort Leonard Wood
- Montana - 208th Regional Training Institute, Fort Harrison
- Nebraska - 209th Regiment (Regional Training Institute), Camp Ashland
- Nevada - 421st Regiment Regional Training Institute, North Las Vegas Readiness Center
- New Hampshire - New Hampshire National Guard Regional Training Institute, Pembroke
- New Jersey - 254th Regional Training Institute, Sea Girt
- New Mexico - 515th Regional Training Institute, Santa Fe
- New York - 106th Regiment Regional Training Institute, Camp Smith Training Site
- North Carolina - 139th Regional Training Institute, Camp Butner Training Center
- North Dakota - 164th Regional Training Institute, Camp Grafton Training Center
- Ohio - 147th Regiment (Regional Training Institute), Columbus
- Oklahoma - 189th Regional Training Institute, Braggs
- Oregon - 249th Regional Training Institute, Camp Umatilla
- Pennsylvania - 166th Regiment - Regional Training Institute, Fort Indiantown Gap
- Rhode Island - 243rd Regiment (Regional Training Institute), Camp Vearnum
- South Carolina - 218th Regional Training Institute, McCrady Training Center
- South Dakota - 196th Regional Training Institute, Rapid City
- Tennessee - 117th Regiment, Regional Training Institute, Smyrna
- Texas - 136th Regional Training Institute, Camp Mabry
- Vermont - 124th Regional Training Institute, Camp Johnson
- Virginia - 183rd Regiment, Regional Training Institute, Fort Pickett
- Washington - 205th Regional Training Institute, Joint Base Lewis-McChord
- West Virginia - the 197th Regional Training Institute, Camp Dawson
- Wisconsin - 426th Regional Training Institute, Fort McCoy
- Wyoming - 213th Regiment - Regional Training Institute, Camp Guernsey
