= 1st Battalion, 194th Field Artillery Regiment =

194th Field Artillery Regiment
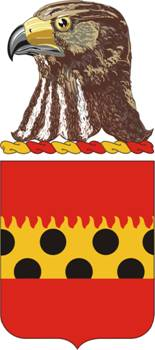
- Coat of arms
- Active: 1942–1946; 1946–present
- Country: United States
- Branch: United States Army
- Type: Field Artillery
- Role: Direct Support of 2nd Infantry Brigade Combat Team
- Size: Battalion
- Garrison/HQ: HQ and HHB (-), Fort Dodge, Iowa DET 1/HHB, Spencer, IA DET 2/HHB, Charles City, IA DET 3/HHB, Owatonna, MN DET 4/HHB, Camp Dodge, IA Battery A, Estherville, IA Battery B, Dubuque, IA Battery C, Camp Dodge, IA Company F, Storm Lake, IA
- Nickname: Thunder
- Patron: Saint Barbara
- Motto: "When Ready"
- Colors: Scarlet
- Equipment: M119 M777 AN/TPQ-53
- Engagements: World War II; Kosovo Force; Operation Noble Eagle; War in Afghanistan (2001-2021); Operation Inherent Resolve

Commanders
- Current commander: LTC Matthew Guerttman

Insignia
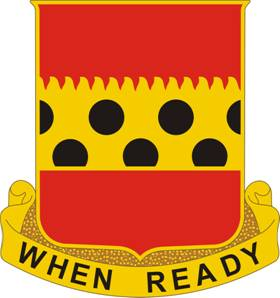
- Distinctive unit insignia

- 34th Infantry Division shoulder sleeve insignia

The 1st Battalion, 194th Field Artillery Regiment is a field artillery battalion of the United States Army National Guard. It is assigned to the 2nd Infantry Brigade Combat Team, 34th Infantry Division in the Iowa Army National Guard as its direct support battalion.

== History ==
=== Birth of a Battalion ===
Originally the 1st Battalion 194th Field Artillery was formed on 26 February 1943 from two other units - the 2nd Battalion 125th Field Artillery Regiment and the 1st Battalion 185th Field Artillery Regiment. Both of these units were part of the 34th Infantry Division, which were half from Minnesota and half from Iowa. This newly formed artillery battalion was equipped with 155 mm howitzers with a General Support (GS) mission to the 34th Infantry Division. Upon mobilization for World War II, the battalion turned in the 155's and received the 8 inch howitzers to better meet the needs of the division. The original motto of the 1st Battalion 194th Field Artillery was "Faithful, Formidable, and Fiery!". This motto was a composite taken from both the 2-125 FA ("Faithful") and the 1-185 FA (Formidable and Fiery). The original unit crest was also different from what it is today. It too was a composite of these two organizations, reflecting symbols of the Minnesota and Iowa National Guard.

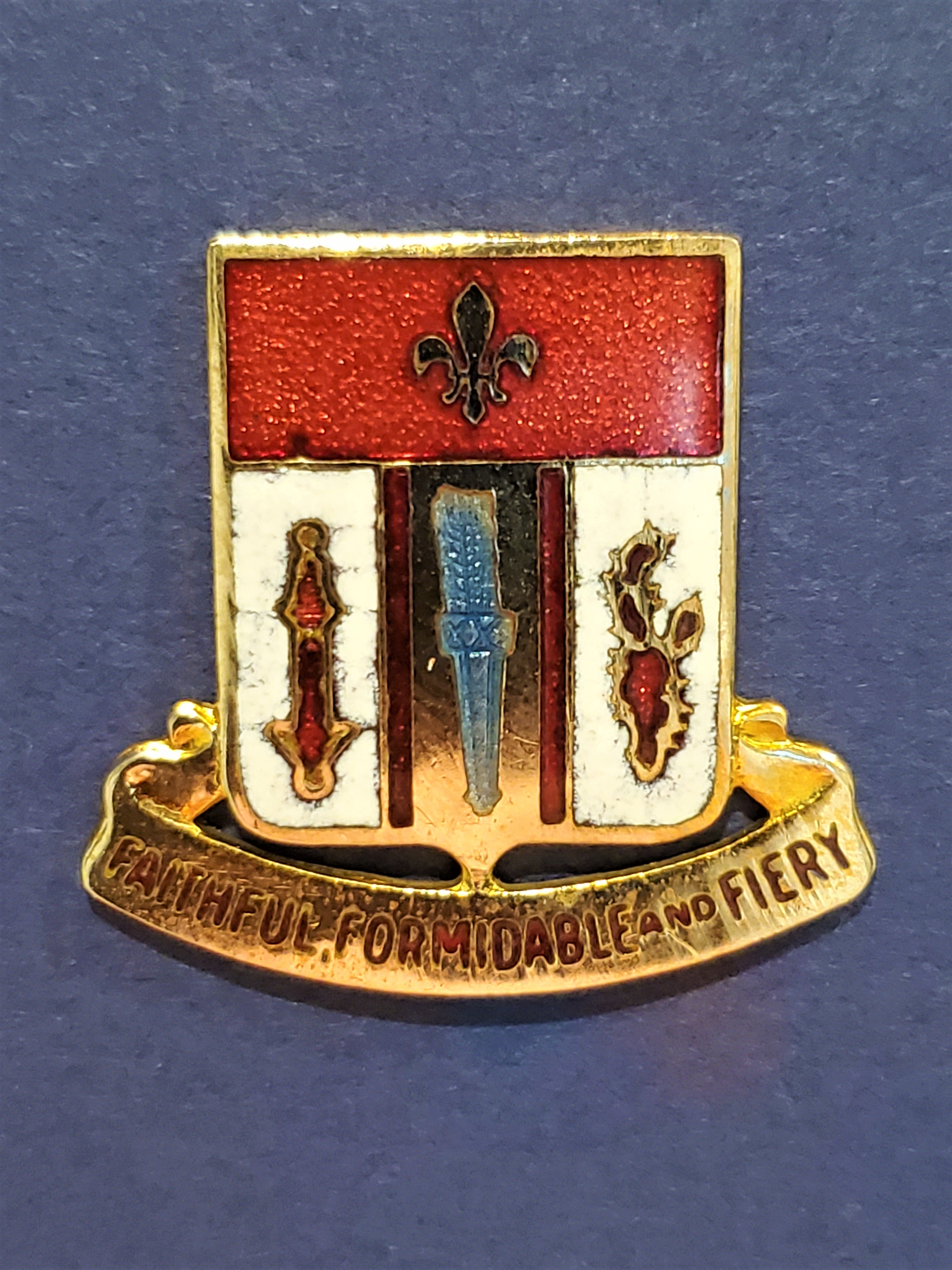

=== World War II ===
The 194th Field Artillery Battalion fired a total of 92,165 artillery rounds and its soldiers received a total of 5 Silver Stars, 2 Legions of Merit, 54 Bronze Stars, 10 Air Medals including 22 clusters, and 140 Purple Hearts. Below is a brief timeline that depicts the significant historical events that the battalion encountered.

- 11 August 1943 Mobilized as part of II Corps (United States), Fifth US Army.
- 23 November 1943 First round fired in action against Germany.
- 8–16 December 1943 Battle of Mt. Lungo and San Pietro.
- 6–8 January 1944 Battle for Mt. Porchia and Mt. Chiaia.
- 15–16 January 1944 Battle for Mt. Trochio
- 24 January to 23 March 1944 Battle for Cassino.
- 23 March to 4 June 1944 Breakthrough and fall of Rome. 2,437 rounds fired in the 24 hour period in preparation for the attack of the 3rd Infantry Division
- 14 July 1944 Back in action near Cecina Italy.
- 1 December 1944 First round fired into Germany (Strasbourg).
- 17 December 1944 At Salmbach, Alsace - met stiff resistance from the Siegfried Line
- 8 January 1945 Battle for Hatten, Alsace.
- 4–12 April 1945 Battle for Heilbronn Germany.

All of these accounts can be found in the book SHOOT, MOVE, AND COMMUNICATE an old artillery adage by U.S. Army Correspondent, Peter Scott in 1945

Currently, Headquarters and Headquarters Battery is the only Battery inheriting lineage from WWII.

=== European Support During the Korean War ===
The battalion gave tactical support to units in Europe during the Korean War. It was activated on 11 September 1950, with the first duty station at Camp McCoy, Wisconsin. During August 1951, the unit was alerted for deployment to Europe. Upon arrival in Mannheim, Germany in September 1951, the 194th FAB was assigned to the 18th Field Artillery Group, V Corps (United States), Seventh United States Army. The unit spent the rest of 1951 in Wurzburg, Germany (North Kasane).

During 1952 the unit successfully completed training in Grafenwöhr in February, Wildflecken in July, and again in Grafenwöhr in September. During September 1952, the unit moved to Wertheim, about 30 miles west of Wurzburg, and was relieved from tactical control of the 18th Field Artillery Group and attached to the 30th Field Artillery Group. In November, the 194th provided tactical support to units in the vicinity of Giessen, Germany.

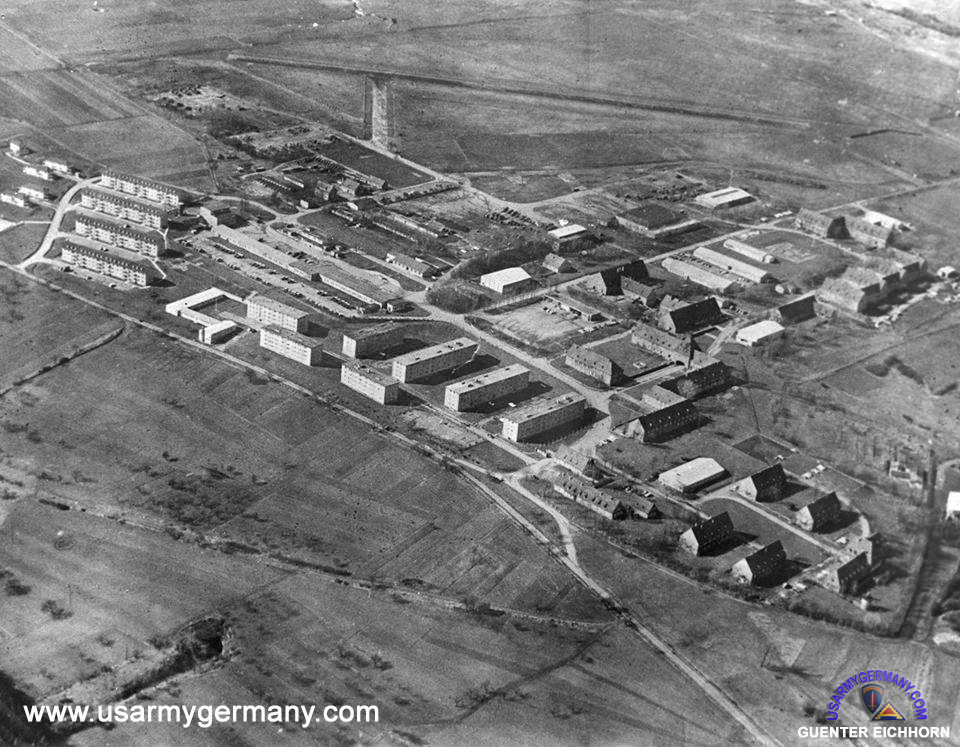
Peden Barracks, Wertheim, 1950s

On 23 January 1953, the battalion was transferred from tactical control of the 30th Field Artillery Group to the 142nd Field Artillery Group. Training exercises during 1953 were conducted at Baumholder during February and May and at Grafenwöhr in July. In August, the battalion provided tactical support to units in the vicinity of Bamberg, Germany. In September 1953, the unit participated in the Seventh United States Army maneuver "Monte Carlo", and in October, participated in the group firing test administered by V Corps Artillery (United States).

The battalion participated in training exercises at Grafenwöhr in February 1954, and at Baumholder in May. During April and September the battalion gave tactical support to units in the vicinity of Bamberg, Germany. On 17 January 1955, the 194th was released from active duty and reverted to National Guard status. The 194th was reactivated as a part of the Iowa National Guard in 1955.

=== Cold War ===
Shortly after World War II, the 194th Field Artillery Battalion (FAB) received federal recognition as a National Guard unit in Iowa. The battalion exchanged its 8-inch howitzers for tractor-drawn 155 mm howitzers. The 194th FAB was a corps artillery battalion, although it trained with the 34th Infantry Division (United States). Although the battalion fought in World War II all honors were inherited by the 556th Field Artillery Battalion of Eastern Iowa organic to the 34th Infantry Division (United States), Headquarters and Headquarters Battery in Fort Dodge retains the WWII lineage.

Until October 1954 the 194th Field Artillery Battalion utilized the motto and insignia of the 556th Field Artillery. After this date, the battalion adopted its current coat of arms and distinctive insignia, with a motto of "When Ready". The insignia (unit crest) represents the essence of artillery. The scarlet color represents the color for artillery. The flame-like partition indicates the intense firepower of the organization's artillery. The pellets depict cannonballs and symbolize readiness.

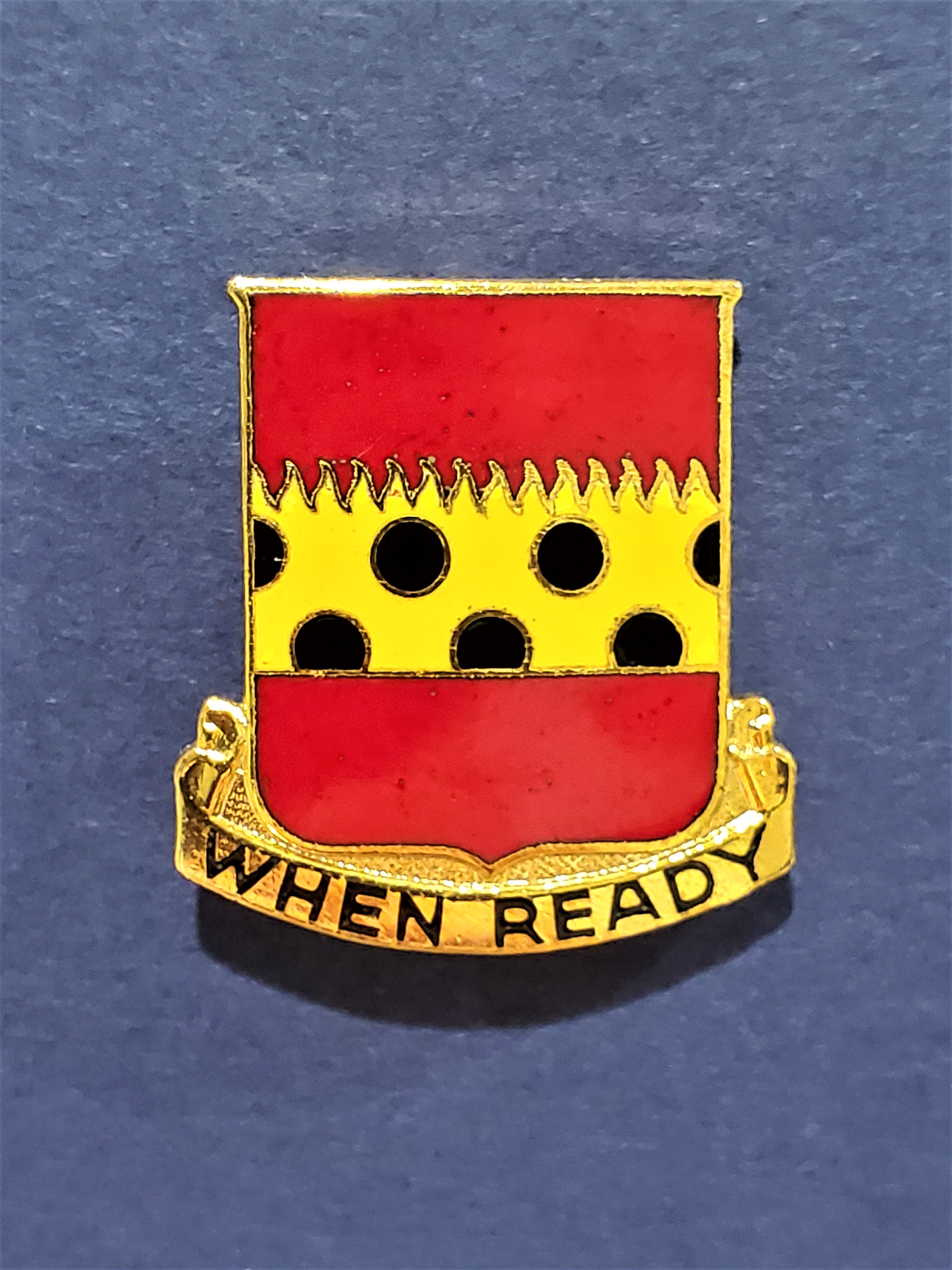

The original units of the battalion had to improvise training locations when they were organized in 1947 as their communities lacked pre-existing National Guard armories. They conducted training and stored their equipment in various public and private buildings. Battery A began in Humboldt and used the wartime hemp plant for its armory. Battery B had its start in Mapleton. Soon after it moved to Algona in an armory that was built in 1949. Battery C, used the Estherville City Hall Auditorium for the drill floor. Service Battery started out in a 12 by 16 room on the second floor of a Pepsi Cola warehouse in Algona. Headquarters and Headquarters Battery started out in the basement of the Tangney hotel in Spencer until they went to the fairgrounds to the entry building and then to the horticulture building.

=== Global War on Terror ===
==== Operation Noble Eagle ====
- September 2002 – July 2003 Operation Noble Eagle II: 345 Soldiers of the 1st Battalion 194th Field Artillery deployed stateside in order to provide security at High Threat Chemical Weapon Disposal Sites and airbases located in Michigan, Indiana, and Ohio.

==== Operation Enduring Freedom ====
- February 2004 – June 2005 Operation Enduring Freedom: 72 Soldiers of the 1st Battalion 194th Field Artillery deployed to Afghanistan with Task Force 168.
- February 2007 – June 2008 Operation Enduring Freedom: 5 Soldiers of the 1st Battalion 194th Field Artillery deployed to Afghanistan in support of Task Force Phoenix VI.
- July 2007 – July 2008 Operation Enduring Freedom: 320 Soldiers of the 1st Battalion 194th Field Artillery deployed as Task Force Thunder to Kosovo and participated in the KFOR 9 rotation.
- July 2010 – July 2011 Operation Enduring Freedom: 228 Soldiers of the 1st Battalion 194th Field Artillery deployed to Afghanistan under Task Force Red Bulls (2nd Infantry Brigade Combat Team, 34th Infantry Division).

==== Operation Iraqi Freedom ====
- December 2004 – December 2005 Operation Iraqi Freedom: 7 Soldiers of the 1st Battalion 194th Field Artillery deployed to Iraq with Task Force 155
- September 2005 – July 2007 Operation Iraqi Freedom: 56 Soldiers of the 1st Battalion 194th Field Artillery deployed to Iraq with Task Force 133

==== Operation Freedom's Sentinel ====
- August 2020 – July 2021 Operation Freedom's Sentinel: Soldiers from Bravo, Charlie, and Headquarters and Headquarters Batteries conducted a Counter Rocket, Artillery, and Mortar (C-RAM) mission utilizing the Land-based Phalanx Weapon System in various locations in Afghanistan. While 25 Soldiers from Headquarters 1st Battalion 194th Field Artillery Regiment conducted staff operations in Qatar.

==== Operation Inherent Resolve ====
- August 2020 – July 2021 Operation Inherent Resolve: Soldiers from Alpha, Charlie, and Headquarters and Headquarters Battery 1st Battalion 194th Field Artillery Regiment tasked from Operation Freedom's Sentinel conducted a Counter Rocket, Artillery, and Mortar (C-RAM) mission utilizing the Land-based Phalanx Weapon System in various locations in Iraq.

==== Operation Inherent Resolve (2025–present ====
In 2025, a battalion-sized element of the 1st Battalion, 194th Field Artillery Regiment deployed as part of a brigade-wide Iowa Army National Guard rotation in support of Operation Inherent Resolve. Operating under Task Force REDLEG, the unit conducted base defense and force protection missions in support of Combined Joint Task Force–Operation Inherent Resolve within the U.S. Central Command area of responsibility. The battalion remains deployed in theater as of 2026.

== Current equipment ==
June 2017 The 1-194 FA transitioned into a Composite Field Artillery BN consisting of two 119A3 (105mm) six gun batteries and one M777A2 (155mm) six gun battery. The BN is converted into a 3x6 Composite FA BN. Additionally, all maneuver BN Fire Support Cells and Fire Support Teams return to the FA BN. Alpha (Anarchy) Battery is located in Spencer, Iowa. Bravo (Bullseye) Battery is located in Dubuque, Iowa. The M777A2 battery, Charlie Battery, has recently been re-located to Camp Dodge in Johnston, IA.

One FSC/FST, DET 3 194 FA (FST), is located in Owatonna MN in support of the 2-135 IN.

== 194th Soldiers in Action ==
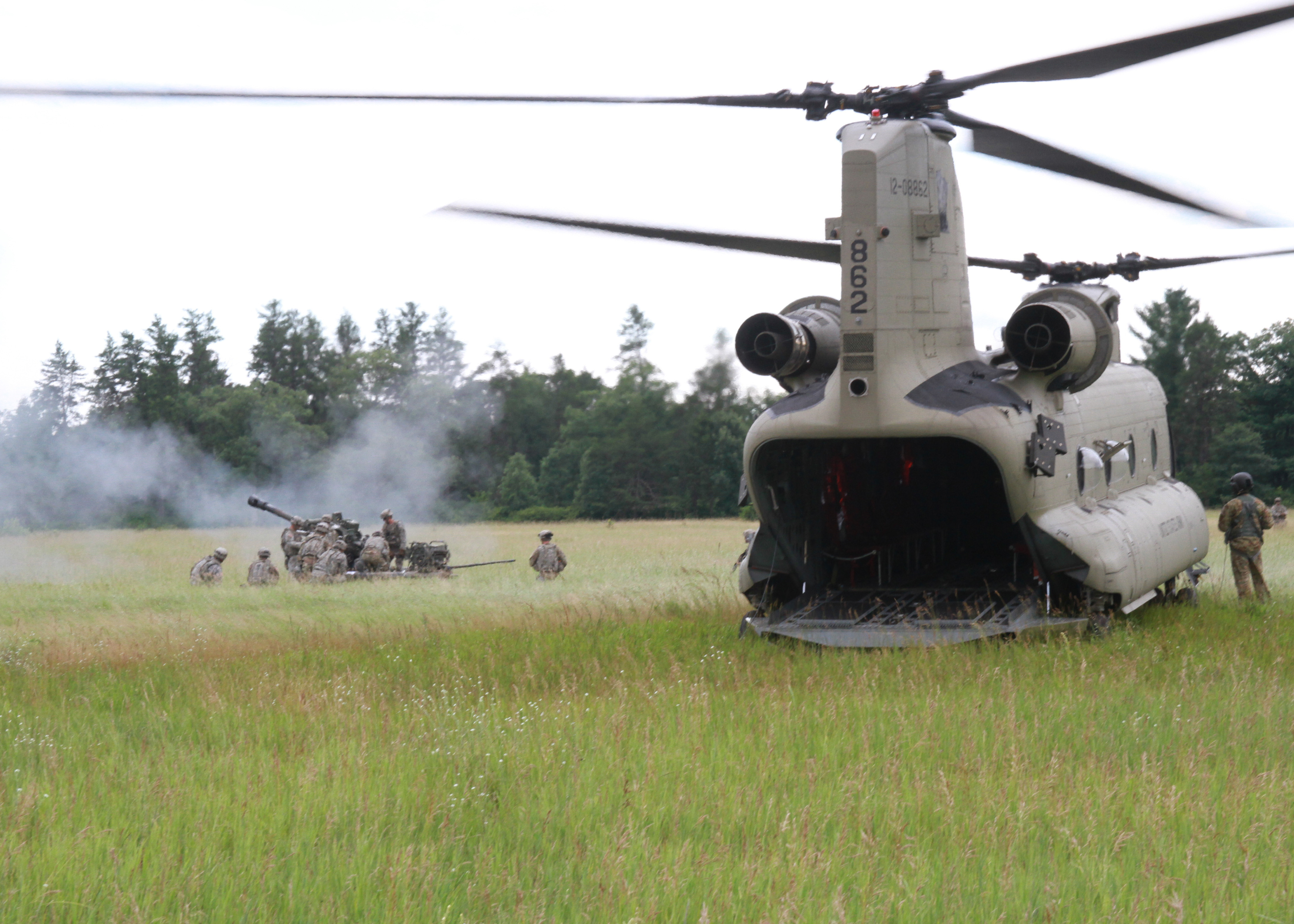
A M119A3 howitzer conducts a Field Artillery raid.

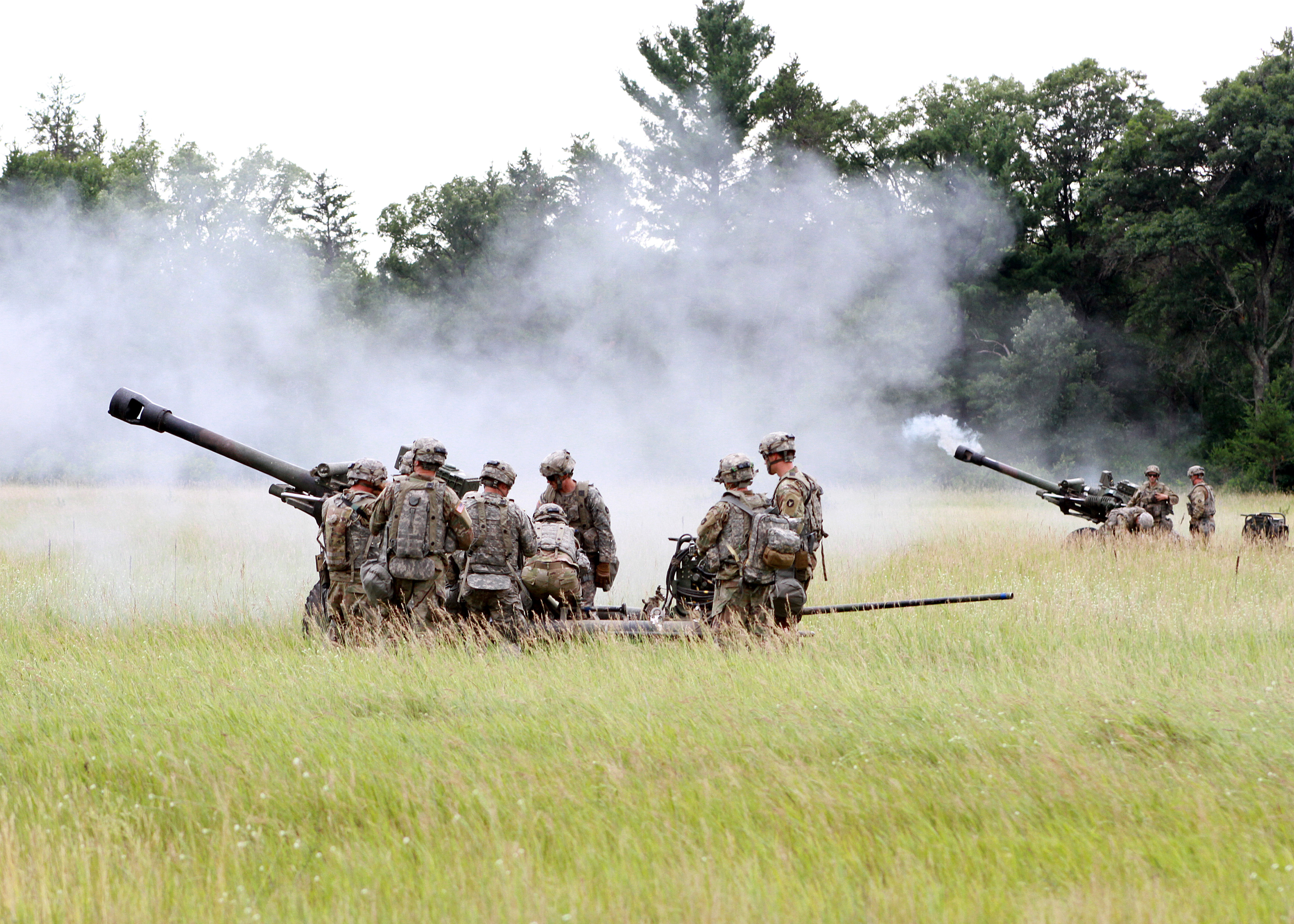
Sending rounds downrange

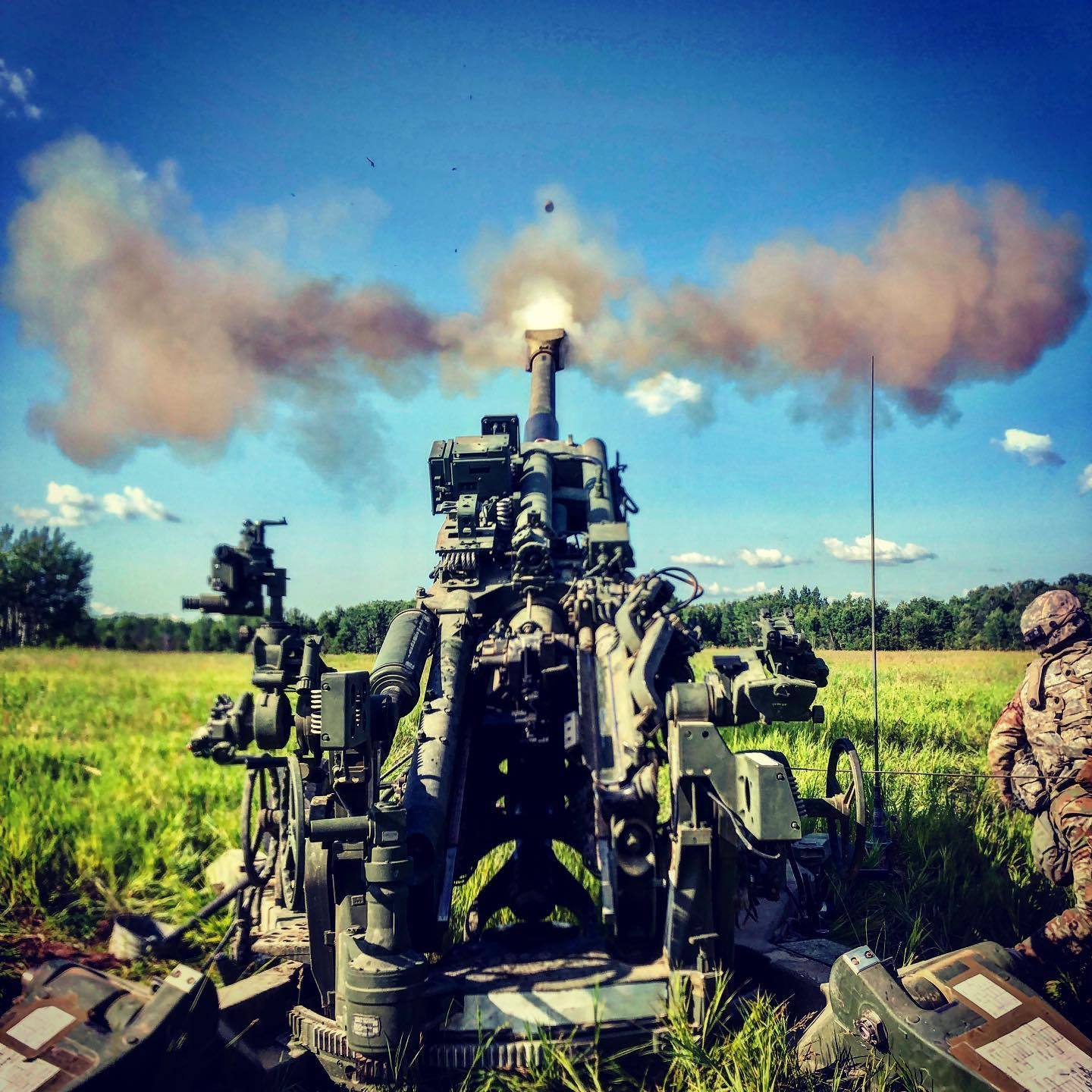
Charlie Battery 1-194th FAR, M777A2

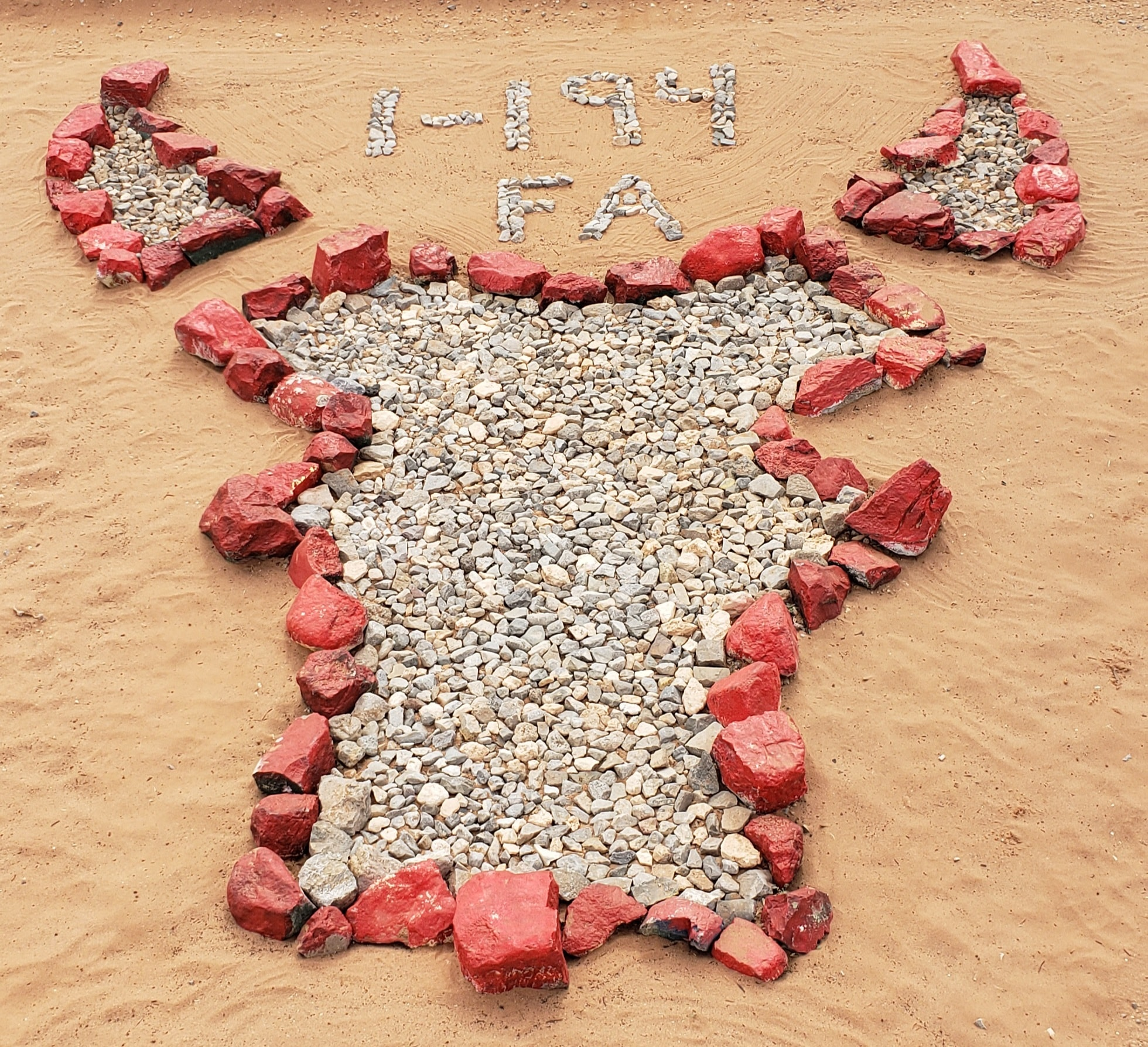
Desert Bulls, Camp McGregor, New Mexico

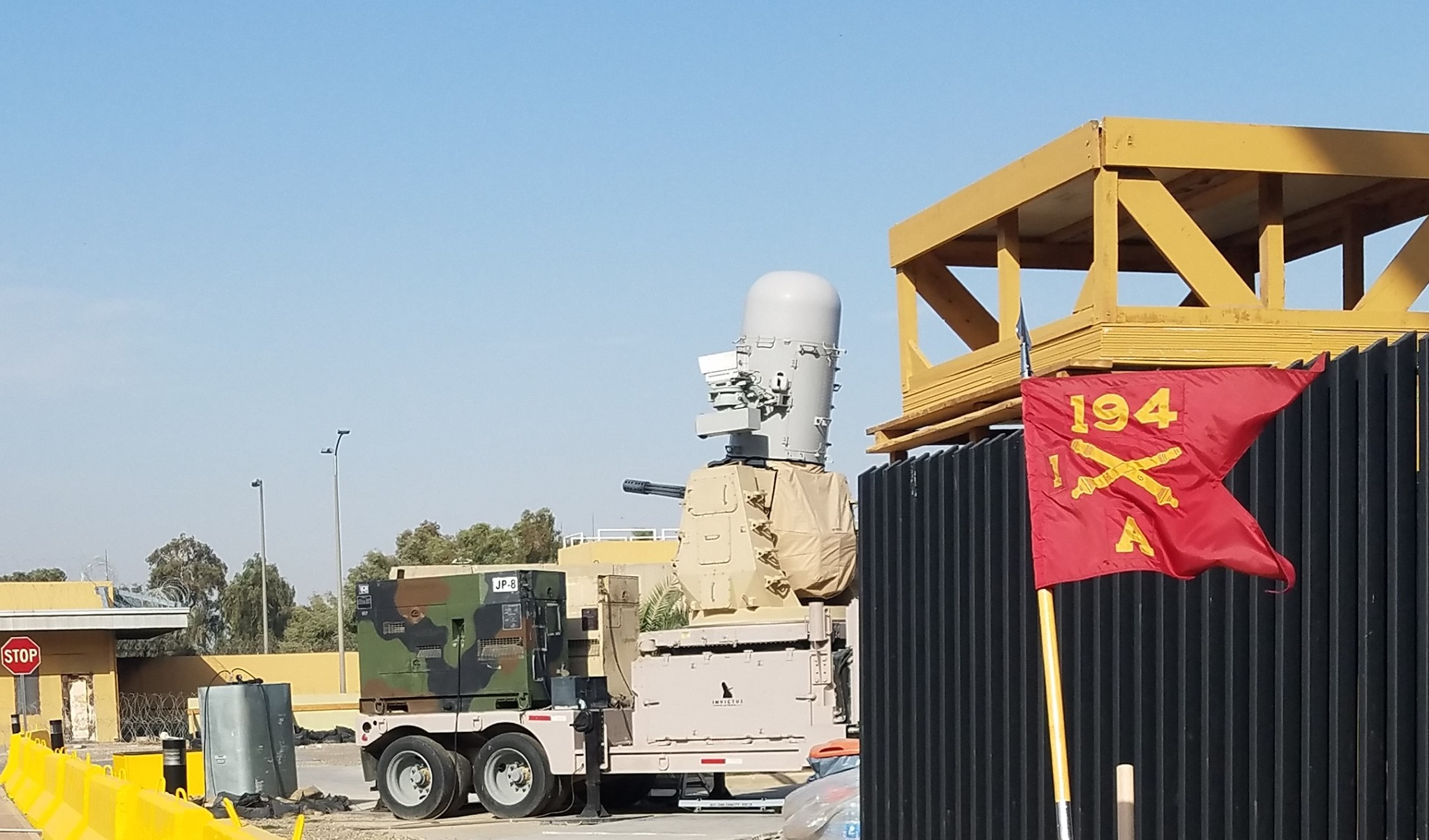
Alpha Battery Phalanx in Iraq

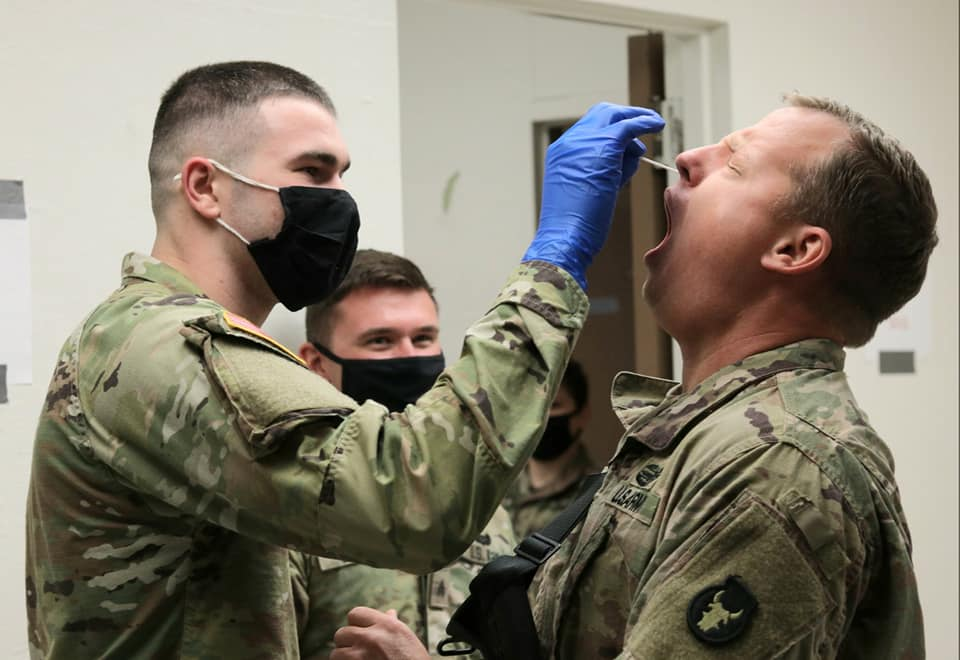
Battalion Commander leading the charge on COVID testing

== Lineage and honors ==
=== Lineage ===
- Organized and Federally recognized 13 November 1947 in the Iowa Army National Guard as the 194th Field Artillery Battalion and assigned to the 34th Infantry Division with headquarters at Spencer
- Ordered into active Federal service 11 September 1950 at home stations

(194th Field Artillery Battalion [NGUS] organized and Federally recognized 9 March 1953 with headquarters at Humboldt)

- Released 17 January 1955 from active Federal service and reverted to state control; Federal recognition concurrently withdrawn from the 194th Field Artillery Battalion (NGUS)
- Reorganized and re-designated 1 March 1959 as the 194th Artillery, a parent regiment under the Combat Arms Regimental System, to consist of the 1st Howitzer Battalion
- Reorganized 1 January 1968 to consist of the 1st Battalion, an element of the 47th Infantry Division
- Reorganized 8 January 1972 to consist of the 1st Field Artillery Battalion, an element of the 47th Infantry Division
- Re-designated 1 May 1972 as the 194th Field Artillery, to consist of the 1st Battalion
- Withdrawn 1 June 1989 from the Combat Arms Regimental System and reorganized under the United States Army Regimental System
- Reorganized 10 February 1991 to consist of the 1st Battalion, an element of the 34th Infantry Division

(1st Battalion ordered into active Federal service 3 September 2002 at home stations; released from active Federal service 2 September 2003 and reverted to state control)

- Re-designated 1 October 2005 as the 194th Field Artillery Regiment
- Reorganized 1 September 2006 to consist of the 1st Battalion, an element of the 2d Brigade Combat Team, 34th Infantry Division

(1st Battalion ordered into active Federal service 18 July 2007 at home stations; released from active Federal service 20 August 2008)
(1st Battalion ordered into active Federal service 29 July 2010 at home stations; released from active Federal service 1 September 2011 and reverted to state control)
(1st Battalion ordered into active Federal service 3 August 2020 at home stations; released from active Federal service September 2021 and reverted to state control)

=== Campaign Credits ===
Kosovo

- Kosovo Defense Campaign 2007-2008

Global War On Terror

Afghanistan Campaign

- Consolidation III
- Transition II

==== Headquarters Battery (Fort Dodge), 1st Battalion, entitled to ====
World War I

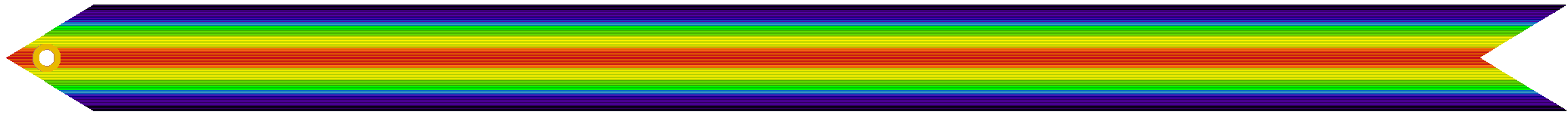
- Streamer without inscription

World War II

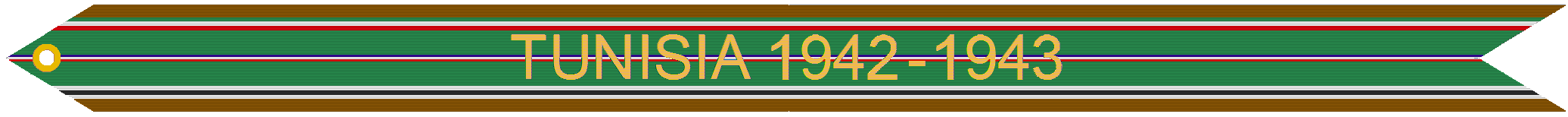
- Tunisia
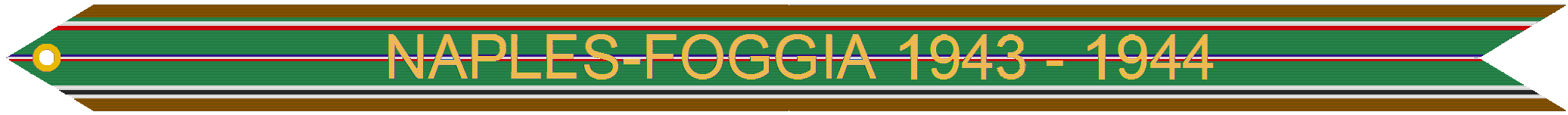
- Naples-Foggia
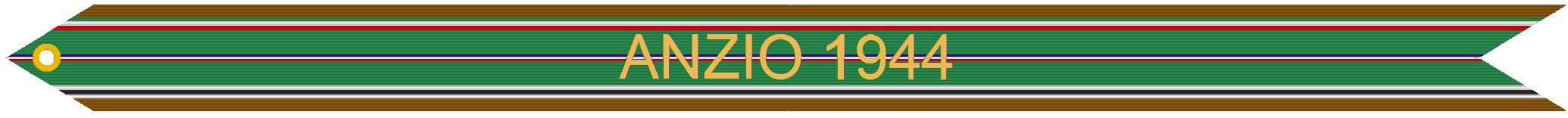
- Anzio
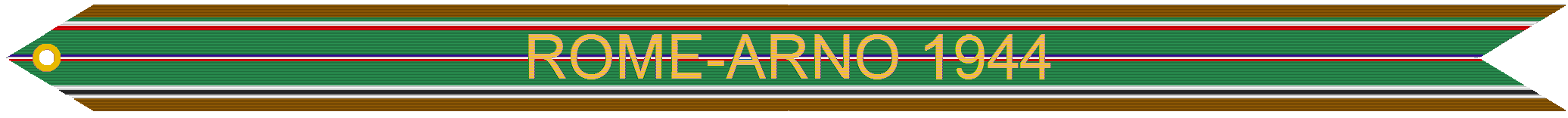
- Rome-Arno
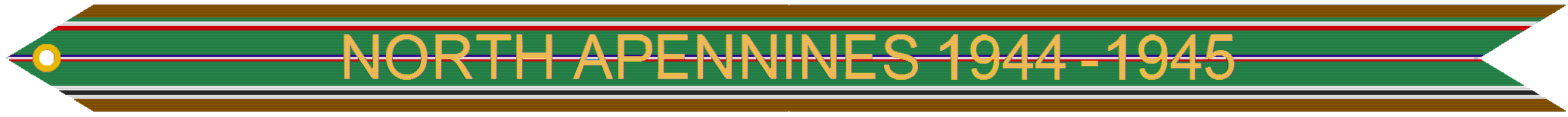
- North Apennines
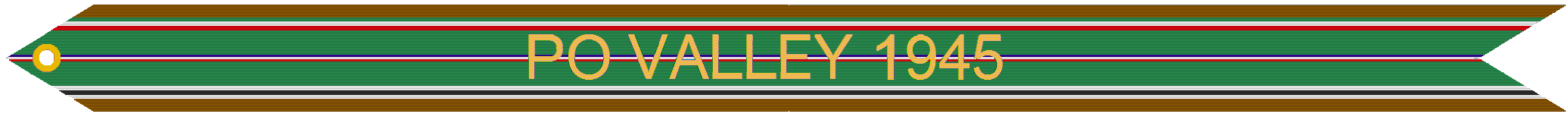
- Po Valley

Operation Inherent Resolve

- Normalize pending

==== Alpha Battery (Estherville), 1st Battalion, entitled to ====
Operation Inherent Resolve

- Normalize pending

==== Bravo Battery (Camp Dodge), 1st Battalion, entitled to ====
Operation Freedom's Sentinel

- Transition II pending

==== Charlie Battery (Alexandria), 1st Battalion, entitled to ====
Operations Freedom's Sentinel

- Transition II pending

=== Battalion Decorations ===
- Army Superior Unit Award, Streamer embroidered 2002-2003
- Meritorious Unit Commendation (Army), Streamer embroidered AFGHANISTAN 2010-2011
- Meritorious Unit Commendation (Army), Streamer embroidered AFGHANISTAN RETROGRADE 2021

==== Headquarters Battery (Fort Dodge), 1st Battalion, entitled to ====
- French Croix de Guerre with Palm, World War II, Streamer embroidered BELVEDERE

== Commanders and Command Sergeants Major ==
=== Commanders ===
- LTC Clyde Colwell FEB 1943 - NOV 1947
- LTC Elmer Lindhart NOV 1947 - 1952
- MAJ Phillip Honshaw 1952 - 1953
- LTC Roger Snow, JR 1953 - 1954
- MAJ Wayne Hopkins 1954 - 1954
- LTC Jack Kron 1954 - 1955
- LTC Elmer Lindhart 1955 - SEP 1956
- MAJ Clinton Meadows SEP 1956 - JUN 1957
- LTC James Flanagan JUN 1957 - MAR 1963
- MAJ Warren Nelson MAR 1963 - MAY 1964
- LTC Keith Campbell MAY 1964 - OCT 1970
- LTC Herbert Harminson OCT 1970 - FEB 1973
- LTC Vernon Buchman FEB 1973 - FEB 1978
- LTC Richard Johnson FEB 1978 - APR 1979
- LTC Jack Pitzer APR 1979 - APR 1982
- LTC Donald Banwart APR 1982 - SEP 1984
- LTC Jerry Gorden SEP 1984 - SEP 1988
- LTC Dennis Niles SEP 1988 - OCT 1989
- LTC Tracy Warnock OCT 1989 - DEC 1993
- LTC Randall Jipp JAN 1994 - APR 1996
- LTC Russell Bierl MAY 1996 - JUN 1997
- LTC Craig Bargfrede JUL 1997 - DEC 2000
- LTC Gregory Guiney DEC 2000 - AUG 2002
- LTC Michael Jensen SEP 2002 - NOV 2004
- LTC Matthew Pitstick DEC 2004 - SEP 2008
- LTC John Cunningham OCT 2008 - JAN 2012
- LTC Derek Adams JAN 2012 - AUG 2014
- LTC Corey McCoid SEP 2014 - DEC 2016
- LTC Eric Weiland DEC 2016 - JAN 2020
- LTC Steve Hall JAN 2020 - MAY 2022
- LTC Neil Daniels MAY 2022 - OCT 2024
- LTC Matthew Guerttman OCT 2024 - Present

=== Command Sergeants Major ===
- CSM Alan Anderson 01 JAN 1968 - 03 OCT 1973
- CSM Donald McQueen 25 OCT 1974 - 01 AUG 1980
- CSM James Kelley 20 AUG 1980 - 01 AUG 1986
- CSM Leslie Peterson 01 OCT 1986 - 15 JUL 1995
- CSM David Peters 01 OCT 1995 - 14 APR 2000
- CSM Steven Kulow 01 APR 2000 - 15 AUG 2001
- CSM David Peters 23 SEP 2001 - 30 NOV 2003
- CSM Craig Berte 01 DEC 2003 - 01 APR 2006
- CSM David Enright 01 APR 2007 - 11 FEB 2012
- CSM James Cline 12 FEB 2012 - 2018
- CSM Jeremy Strasser 2018 - AUG 2019
- 1SG James Sherrill AUG 2019 - JAN 2020
- CSM William Potts JAN 2020 - MAY 2023
- CSM James Sherrill MAY 2023 - MAY 2025
- CSM Nicholas Knutson MAY 2025 - present

== Heraldry ==
=== Distinctive unit insignia ===
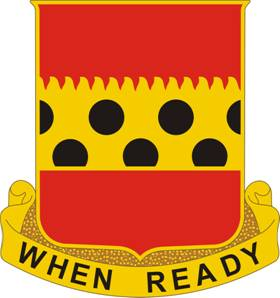

- Description/Blazon: A Gold color metal and enamel device 1 1/8 inches (2.86 cm) in height overall consisting of a shield blazoned: Gules, a fess pelleté rayonné to chief Or. Attached below and to the sides of the shield a Gold scroll inscribed "WHEN READY" in Black letters.
- Symbolism: The colors scarlet and yellow are for Artillery. The flame-like partition line indicates the intense fire power of the organization's artillery. The pellets depict cannonballs and symbolize readiness.
- Background: The distinctive unit insignia was originally approved for the 194th Field Artillery Battalion on 13 October 1954. It was re-designated for the 194th Artillery Regiment on 1 December 1965. The insignia was re-designated for the 194th Field Artillery Regiment on 19 July 1972.

=== Coat of arms ===
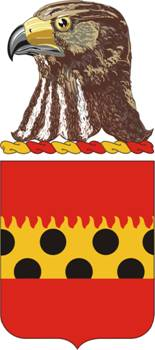

- Description/Blazon
  - Shield: Gules, a fess pelleté rayonné to chief Or.
  - Crest: That for the regiments and separate battalions of the Iowa Army National Guard: On a wreath of the colors Or and Gules, a hawk's head erased Proper.
  - Motto: WHEN READY.
- Symbolism
  - Shield: The colors scarlet and yellow are for Artillery. The flame-like partition line indicates the intense fire power of the organization's artillery. The pellets depict cannonballs and symbolize readiness.
  - Crest: The crest is that of the Iowa Army National Guard.
- Background: The coat of arms was originally approved for the 194th Field Artillery Battalion on 13 October 1954. It was re-designated for the 194th Artillery Regiment on 1 December 1965. The insignia was re-designated for the 194th Field Artillery Regiment on 19 July 1972.

== See also ==
- 34th Infantry Division (United States)
- Field Artillery Branch (United States)
