= Minnesota–Croatia National Guard Partnership =

Minnesota–Croatia State Partnership
- Part of the U.S. European Command State Partnership Program
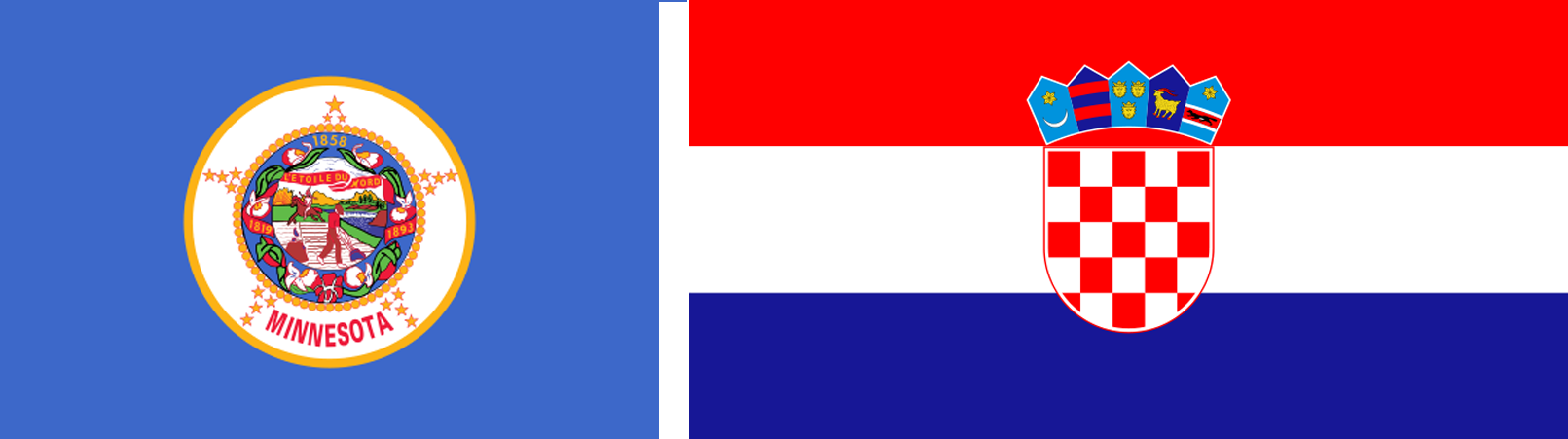
- Origin: 1996
- Country president: Zoran Milanović
- Prime minister: Andrej Plenković
- Minister of defense: Mario Banožić
- Ambassador to U.S.: Josko Paro
- Ambassador to Croatia: Kenneth Merten
- Adjutant general: MG Shawn P. Manke
- 2012 Engagements: 9
- NATO member: Yes (2009)
- EU member: Yes (2013)

Croatia

The Minnesota–Croatia National Guard Partnership is one of 25 European partnerships that make up the U.S. European Command State Partnership Program and one of 88 worldwide partnerships that make-up the National Guard State Partnership Program. The partnership began in July 1996 and has progressed from small unit exchanges to deployments as Operational Mentoring and Liaison Teams (OMLT) in support of Operation Enduring Freedom (OEF). The partnership continues to support overseas contingency operations; assist in the development of disaster preparedness and consequence management, and support the EUCOM Commander's Security Cooperation Objectives (military transformation, interoperability, civil-military operations, and regional military-to-military and civil security events).

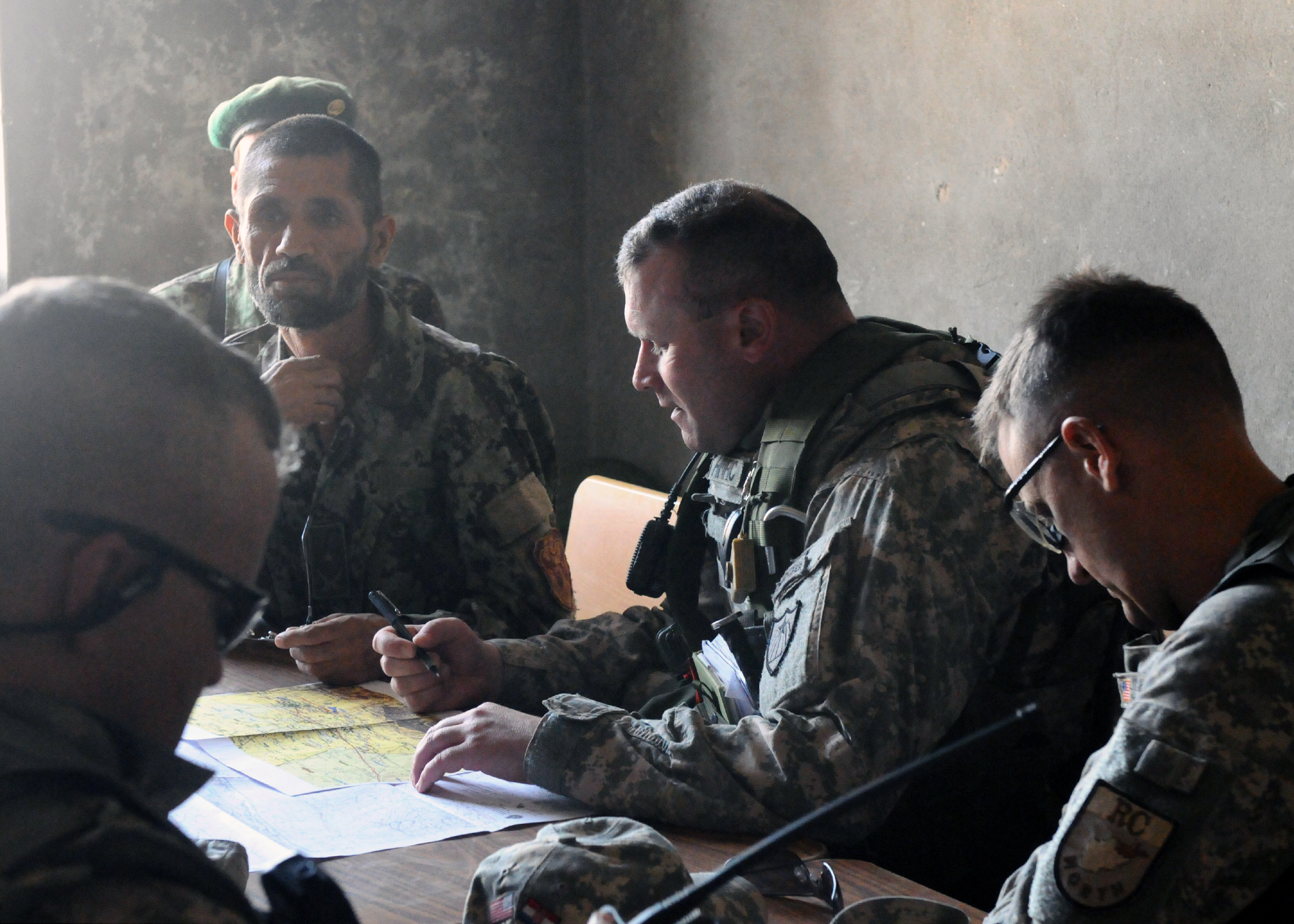
A Minnesota Guard member from Camp Mike Spann talks with local Afghans on election day in Afghanistan Sept. 18, 2010.

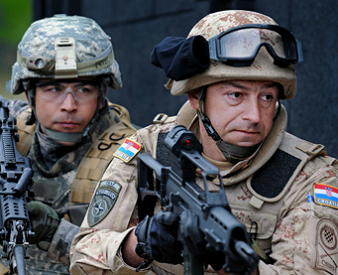
Croatian and Minnesota National Guard Soldiers prepare to clear a room during an exercise at the Joint Multinational Readiness Center in Germany.M249 and H&K G36

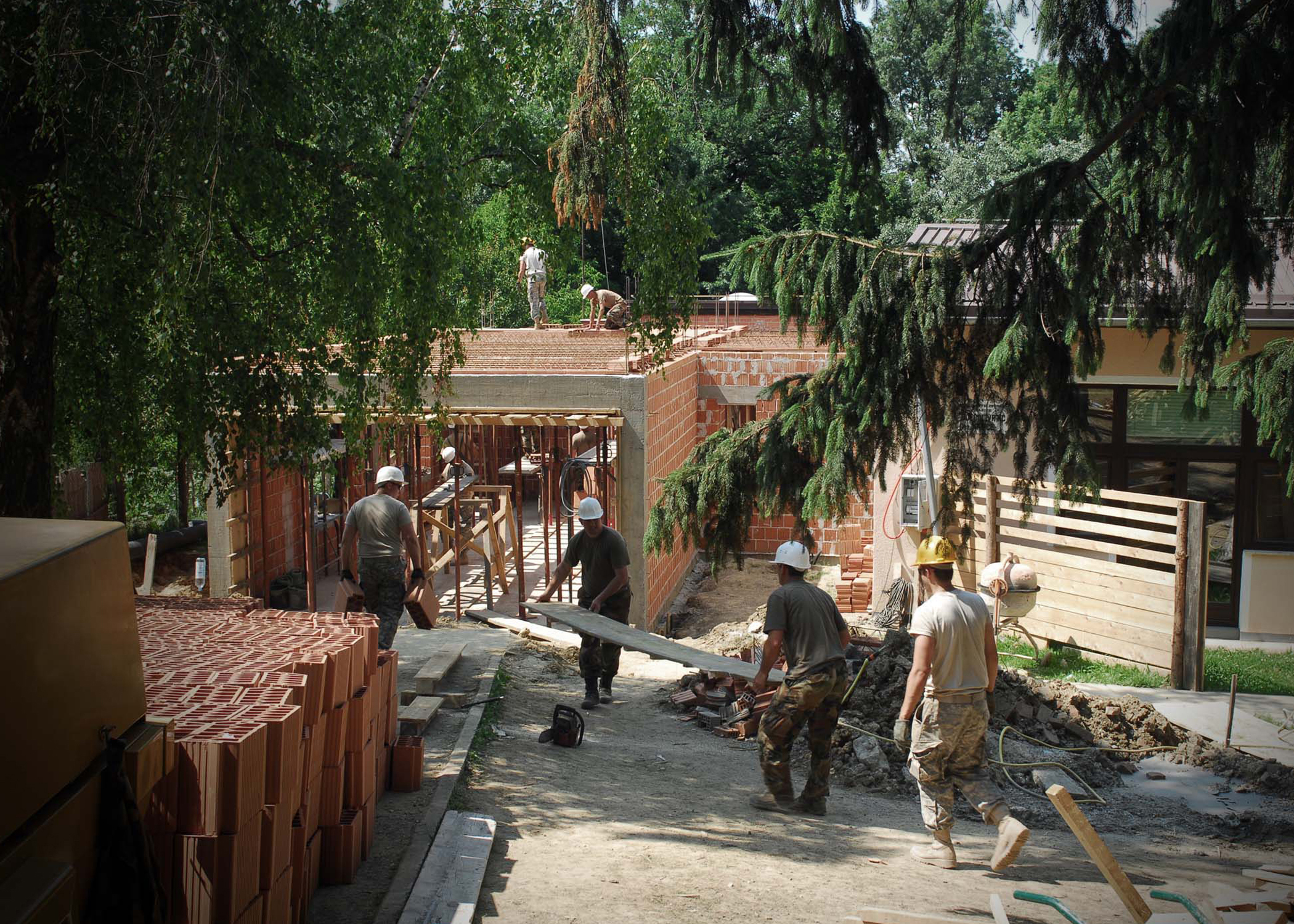
Soldiers from the Minnesota National Guard work side-by-side with Croatian army engineers to complete a building project designed to train the soldiers and strengthen the cooperative relationship that exists with Croatia.

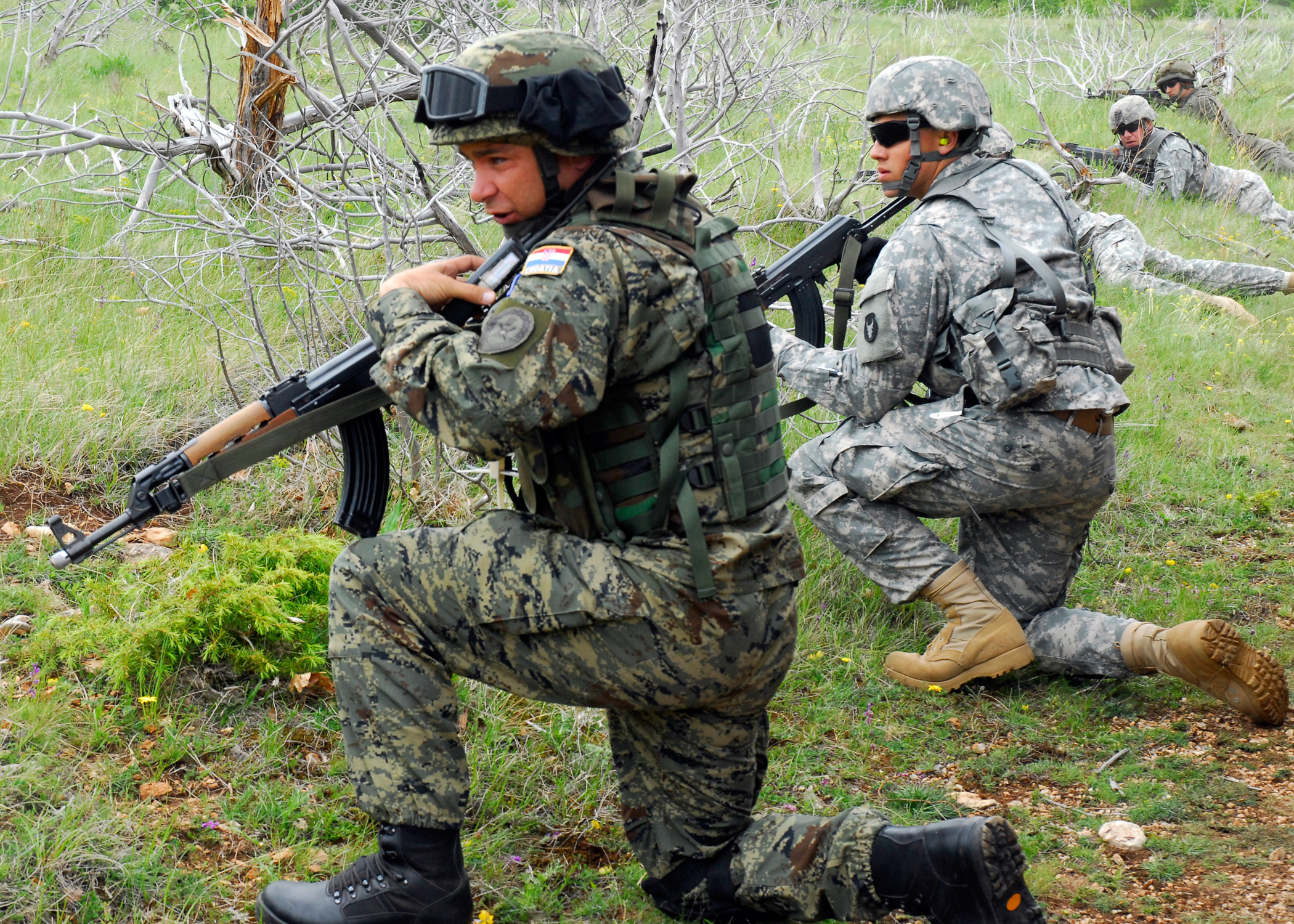
Soldiers from the Minnesota Army National Guard train with members of the Croatian army in Croatia during Guardex 12.

== History ==
- The partnership began in July 1996.
- Croatia’s accession into NATO in 2009 was based on their participation in NATO’s Partnership for Peace exercises starting in 2000.
- National elections were held December 4, 2011. There was a major transition of power from Croatian Democratic Union HDZ Party (Hrvatska demokratska zajednica) to Kukuriku (Social Democratic Party).
- Croatia applied for EU membership in 2003, and Joined the alliance in 2013

== Partnership focus ==
The events within the scope of the MNNG capabilities in the SPP will continue with emphasis on Crisis Response, building a Reserve Force, Support to Civilian Authorities with the intent to execute a responsible transition from Military-to-Military to Civilian-to-Civilian events. The MNNG is making a deliberate effort to partner Croatian Government leaders with Minnesota State Government entities for CIV/CIV engagements with the intent to facilitate planning fusion for CIV/CIV discussions on future trade relations with MN and Croatian international and domestic business leaders.

2023 Planned Events:

- Defense Support to Civilian Authorities
- Cyber Defense
- Rotary Wing Aviation (UH-60M) modernization
- Bradley M2A2 ODS modernization
- Medical Role 2 implementation
- Field Artillery Exchanges
