= 175th Regiment, Regional Training Institute =

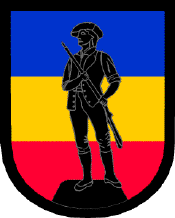
- Country: United States
- Allegiance: Minnesota
- Branch: United States Army National Guard
- Role: Training
- Size: Regiment
- Part of: Minnesota Army National Guard
- Garrison/HQ: Camp Ripley, Minnesota
- Website: https://mn.gov/mnng/units/joint-force-headquarters/175th-regiment/

Commanders
- Current commander: COL Brian Malecha
- Command Sergeant Major: CSM Daniel Schwichtenberg

Insignia
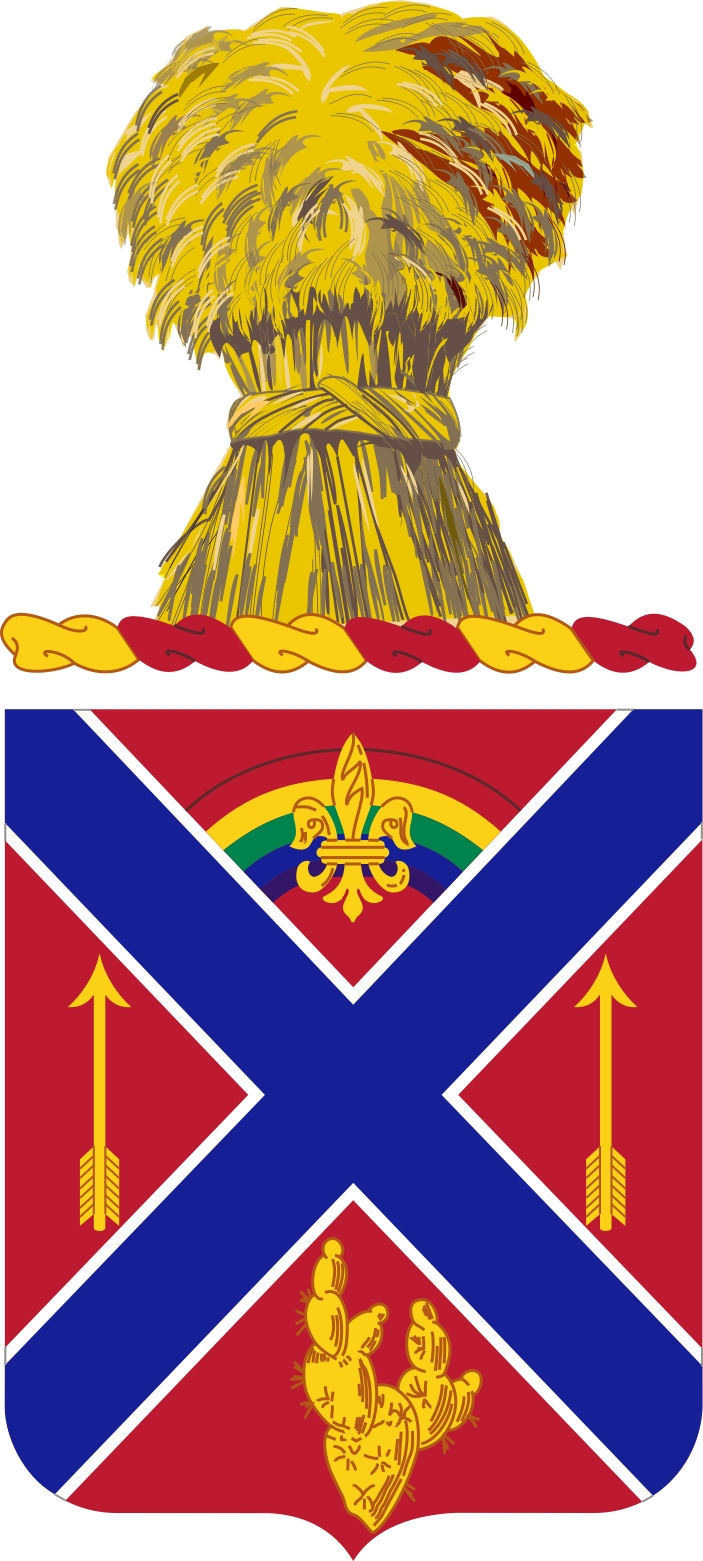
- 175th RTI Coat of Arms

The 175th Regiment, Regional Training Institute, headquartered at Camp Ripley, provides combat arms, occupational specialty, and officer and warrant officer training to US Army soldiers from across the country in support of the One Army School System. Students from all three Army components; active, reserve and National Guard are offered over 30 courses. The RTI also hosts soldiers from Norway and Croatia, partners in the Minnesota National Guard’s State Partnership Program.

== Units ==
Main article.

- Joint Force Headquarters-Minnesota
  - 175th Regiment, Regional Training Institute
    - 1st Battalion (Officer Candidate School)
    - 2nd Battalion (Modular Training)
    - Regional Training Site-Maintenance

== History ==
In 2016, the RTSM sent instructors to Croatia to train their soldiers on their new MRAP vehicles.

In 2020, the RTI trained 716 soldiers, some from Europe and Korea, commissioned 19 officers, and 15 warrant officers.

In 2021, the 175th received their highest ever Training and Doctrine Command (TRADOC) accreditation evaluation scores; 100% for 1st Battalion and 99.5% for 2nd Battalion.

== Leaders ==
Commanders
- COL Brian Malecha, 2023 – present
- COL Jason Benson, 2020 – 2022
- COL Brian Bobo, 2018 – 2019
- COL Stephanie K. Horvath, 2015 – 2017
- COL Michael S. Funk, 2012 – 2015
- COL Bruce A. Jensen
Command Sergeants Major
- CSM Daniel Schwichtenberg, 2025 – present
- CSM Chad Turner, 2024 – 2024
- CSM Shane Hybben, 2020 – 2022
- CSM Robert L. Klinkner, 2017 – 2019
- CSM John M. Wood, 2014 – 2017
- CSM Douglas J. Wortham, 2012 – 2013
- CSM Ron Ronning, ca. 2008 – 2010
