= 34th Infantry Division Band =

- Distinctive unit insignia of the 34th Infantry Division Band
- Active: 30 April 1900 – present (126 years, 5 months)
- Country: United States of America
- Branch: United States Army
- Role: Military Band
- Part of: 34th Infantry Division, Minnesota National Guard
- Garrison/HQ: Rosemount, Minnesota
- Nickname: "Red Bulls"
- Motto: "Attack Attack Attack"
- March: "March of the Red Bull Legions"
- Website: US Army Music, 34th Infantry Division Band

The 34th Infantry Division Band is an Army National Guard band stationed in Rosemount, Minnesota. The unit is currently assigned to the Headquarters and Headquarters Battalion, 34th Infantry Division, Minnesota National Guard. The mission of the 34th Infantry Division Band is to provide music throughout the spectrum of military operations to instill in soldiers the will to fight and win, foster the support of citizens and promote the national interests of the United States at home and abroad.

== History ==
=== Early years (Mexican Expedition and World War I) ===
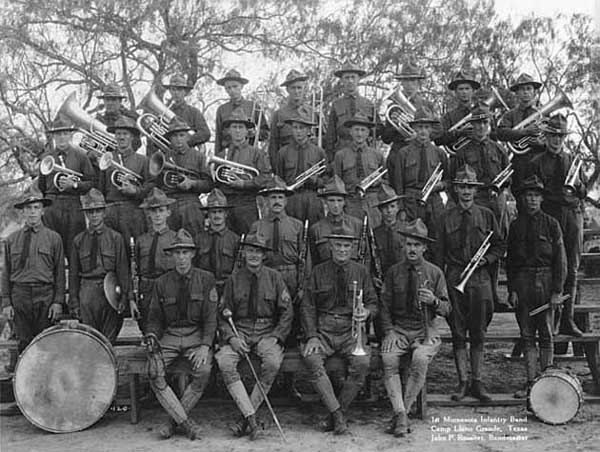
1st Inf Reg Band, MNARNG at Camp Llano Grande, TX. c1916

The 34th Infantry Division Band traces its lineage to the 1st Infantry Band (Minnesota National Guard), organized on 30 April 1900 in Minneapolis, Minnesota. During the early 1900s the Minnesota National Guard fielded 4 bands in addition to the 1st Infantry Band to include: the First Field Artillery Band (St. Paul, Minnesota), the Second Infantry Band (New Ulm, Minnesota) and the Third Infantry Band (Duluth, Minnesota).

With the approval of the National Defense Act the 1st Minnesota Infantry Band was mustered into federal service on 30 June 1916 for service in the Mexican Expedition. The unit was stationed at Camp Llano Grande, Texas where National Guard units were utilized to conduct border patrols and discourage raids as part of a "show of force" gesture. The 1st Minnesota Infantry Band returned home and was discharged from federal service on 14 March 1917 at Fort Snelling, Minnesota.

The 1st Infantry Band was later mobilized as part of the Minnesota National Guard in support of World War I as a part of the newly formed 34th Infantry Division in 1917. Shortly after the unit was redesignated the 135th Infantry Regiment (United States) Band and sent to Camp Cody, New Mexico for training. Although the 34th Infantry Division arrived in France in October 1918, with the signature of the Armistice of 11 November 1918 the division was of limited use. The 135th Infantry Regiment Band was demobilized 18 February 1919 at Camp Grant, Illinois and returned to Minnesota.

The interwar years saw several administrative reorganizations of the 135th Infantry Regiment Band; however the unit remained an organic part of the 135th Infantry Regiment.

=== World War II ===
==== 1941 ====
The 135th Infantry Regiment Band was again mobilized on 10 February in anticipation of the United States' entry into World War II. As part of the 34th Infantry Division, the band received several months of training at Camp Claiborne, Louisiana before participating in the Louisiana Maneuvers from August to September 1941. Shortly after the 07 December attacks on Pearl Harbor and subsequent declaration of war, the 135th Infantry Regiment and Band were assigned a coastal defense mission in New Orleans, Louisiana as the United States prepared for the coming conflict.

==== 1942 ====
On 1 January the 135th Infantry Regiment Band was relieved of its coastal defense mission and transported to Fort Dix, New Jersey to await deployment. The 135th Infantry Regiment Band departed New York Harbor 30 April on the RMS Aquitania arriving in Belfast, Northern Ireland on 11 May under cover of night and finally disembarking in Londonderry on 13 May. The unit was stationed in at Camp Cromore, Portstewart, Northern Ireland where further training was conducted. Despite rigorous training the 135th Infantry Regiment Band found time to perform for US personnel and in doing so earned the distinction of being the first American military band to perform on European soil during World War II. The 135th Regimental History goes on to record:

Throughout the various stations, the Regimental Band was a consistent uplift to morale. Out of the Band was formed the "Ambassadors of Swing", a fourteen-piece orchestra, which gained popularity in the whole of North Ireland. In recognition of their outstanding success, they were selected to officially open the new Red Cross building in Belfast, during which they played an Allied Forces program over the British Broadcasting Corporation and also a National Broadcasting Company program directly to the United States. A secondary dance band was formed, known as "The Revilliers", to accommodate the many calls the "Ambassadors of Swing" could not oblige.

The unit left their station in Northern Ireland on 11 December. After a short stay in Liverpool, England the 135th Infantry Regiment Band boarded HMS Orontes with other Division troops on 23 December 1942, en route to join the 34th Division in Algeria to participate in the North African Campaign.

==== 1943 ====
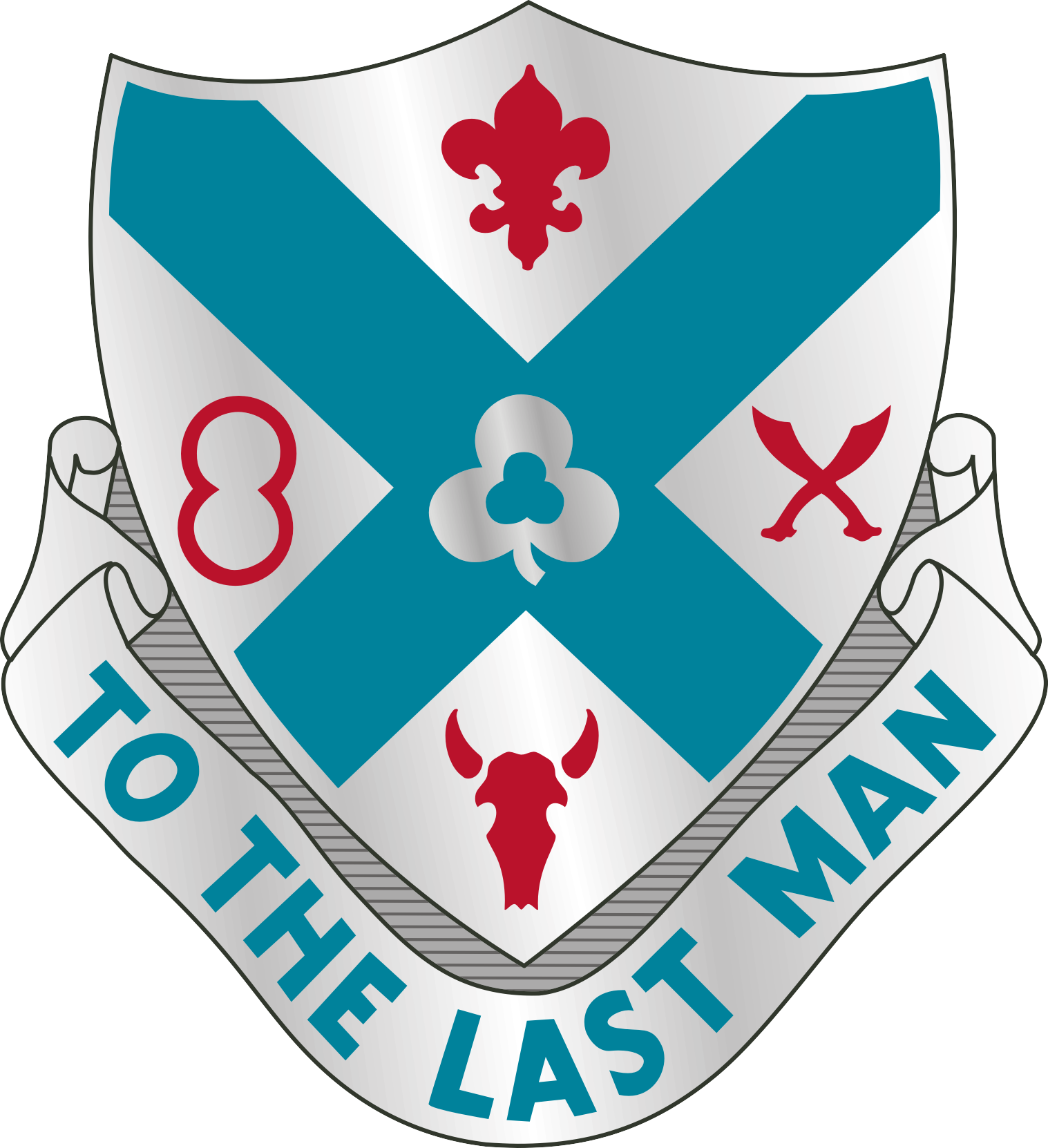
135th Infantry Regiment Band Distinctive Unit Insignia

The 135th Infantry Regiment Band arrived in Mers-el-Kebir, Algeria on 3 January and was quickly transported to a camp in the vicinity of Negrier for additional training through the end of the month. On 2 February the unit moved East as part of the 135th Infantry Regiment, eventually occupying the Pichon area of Tunisia between 10 and 14 February.

The band experienced its first combat while participating in engagements at Sbiba Valley, El Ala, Fondouk el Okbi and the Battle of Hill 609 during the Tunisia Campaign from February through May as the regiment conducted operations against Field Marshal Erwin Rommel and his German and Italian forces. Although a musical unit, it was common for organizational bands like the 135th Infantry Regiment Band to take on many non-musical tasks as described in A History of US Army Bands:

Organization bands performed many non-musical duties as infantry units. Most bands guarded post perimeters and supply trains. They were able to function as musical units when required, as long as they remained organically intact and held occasional rehearsals. Many times, however, commanders would use their bandsmen as litter bearers or replacements in the line.

The 135th Infantry Regiment Band sustained several casualties during the Tunisia Campaign, including one soldier killed during an aerial attack and one killed while participating in operations as a member of the "Ward Force". The unit also lost their musical instruments and sheet music to a bomb blast early in the campaign.

With the unconditional surrender of all Axis troops in the area of operations on 9 May the Tunisia Campaign came to an end and the 135th Infantry Regiment Band was moved to a division bivouac area near Chouigui.

On 15 September the 135th Regiment Band was transported across the Mediterranean Sea to participate in the Allied Invasion of Italy. After passing the coast of Sicily the sea convoy dropped anchor in the Gulf of Salerno and the unit was moved by landing craft to a beach near Paestum and the Sele river. The Band accompanied the 135th Infantry Regiment as they participated in a series of engagements throughout Southern Italy, providing security for the regimental headquarters and assisting the medical detachment as litter bearers. Eventually the unit arrived in Sant'Angelo d'Alife in December where they remained through the end of the year.

==== 1944 ====
At the onset of World War II the 34th Infantry Division fielded the 133rd and 168th regimental bands in addition to the 135th. While all 34th Infantry Division bands had experienced combat during the African Campaigns, the soldiers of 168th Infantry Regiment Band had sustained catastrophic losses during the battle of Faid Pass in February 1943 in which all but 3 of their assigned personnel were killed in action or captured by Axis powers.^{α} The remnants of the 168th Infantry Regiment Band were reassigned to the 133rd Infantry leaving only the 133rd and 135th Infantry Regiment bands remaining by 1944.

As part of an Army wide reorganization directing the consolidation of regimental bands into a single division band, 133rd and 135 Infantry Regiment bands were combined into the 34th Infantry Division Band on 1 January (the first known appearance of the name "34th Infantry Division Band"). While in Piedemount D’Alife the newly formed 34th Infantry Division Band quickly reorganized unit personnel and repaired equipment while performing concerts for division troops for the first time in nearly 9 months. 34th Infantry Division Band leadership divided personnel between the "Ambassadors of Swing" and "Rhythm Majors" dance orchestras and several smaller "jam" groups.

During January, the 34th Infantry Division Band continued to move with the division before being assigned guard duty for the division stockade in Campangnola. While there the Band found time to perform for the 38th Evacuation Hospital, 36th General Hospital and units of the 34th Infantry Division when not performing guard duties.

While the 34th Infantry Division was engaged at the Battle of Monte Cassino in February, the band was called into action and attached to the 1090th Medical Battalion to serve as litter bearers. Warrant Officer David Hamm recounts:

Although each man wore and arm band distinguishing him as a soldier of a medical unit, there were many instances when litter squads were delayed in carrying patients, or obstructed in their approach to the wounded, by enemy sniper and machine gun fire, as well as artillery, mortar, and "screaming meamie" fire. The casualties suffered by the organization during this period, which included one man killed by mortar fire, one man wounded by mortar fire, one man wounded by machine gun fire, one man wounded by sniper fire and several other evacuated for trench foot and exhaustion may be attributed to the bitter cold, wet weather, as well as to the heavy continuous enemy fire on the long grueling evacuation trail which extended from the base of the mountain on the right side of the city of Cassino to the farthest point of advance, a short distance from the walls of the famous Montecassine Abbey.

The 34th Infantry Division was relieved mid-February and reassigned near St. Angelo and Benevento for rest and reorganization. Without delay, the band began performing concerts for the battle weary soldiers of the 34th Infantry Division and providing musical support for battalion and regimental parades.

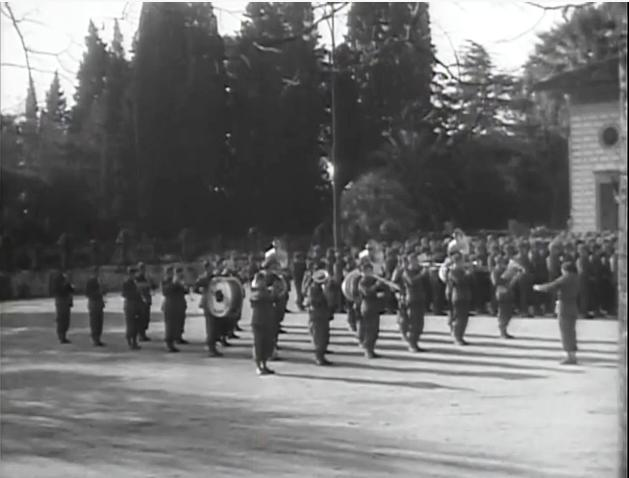
34th Infantry Division Band in Montecatini Terme (Italy) near the end of European Theater hostilities in WWII.

On 5 April the 34th Infantry Division Band was moved by LST to a desolate beachhead for participation in the Battle of Anzio. With the battle in full swing, the unit acted quickly to dig fortified positions and secure unit equipment.

Their bivouac area was found to be an open field, of the typical Anzio variety, bounded on all sides by artillery pieves, anti-aircraft guns, munitions dumps, chemical smoke pots, ration dumps, and other military objectives which were under almost continual enemy observation and artillery fire so no time was lost in digging in all instruments, supplies, kitchen and personnel for protection. It was soon found that falling flack and unexploded shells from anti-aircraft guns were also a hazard so all "holes" were promptly covered as well as possible by any materials available that would serve the purpose. The construction of these protections were well worth the time and energy expended for although several shells and bombs landed in and around the area, no casualties were inflicted by harassing fire laid down on all roads.

The 34th Infantry Division Band continued to move with the division throughout the Italian Campaign both performing concerts and assuming their combat duties when required. Notable events during this time include performing for a massive review of British and US 5th Army forces by Prime Minister Winston Churchill and a concert featuring NBC Orchestra conductor Andre Kostelanetz and renowned singer Lily Pons for audience of over 8,000. Although during this time the 34th Infantry Division Band was utilized primarily in a musical capacity, the unit was attached to the 109th Engineering Battalion from September to October to assist in road maintenance within the division sector.

1944 ended with the "Ambassadors of Swing" assigned to a rest center at Cavallina and the "Rhythm Majors" performing for dances in Montocatini.

==== 1945 ====
The 34th Infantry Division Band continued to perform numerous concerts and dances throughout Italy until war in the European Theater of Operations came to an end on 3 May. Both the 34th Infantry Division and the 34th Infantry Division Band were rotated to the United States and officially inactivated on 3 November at Camp Patrick Henry, Virginia. After 4 years and nearly 9 months of federal wartime service, the soldiers of the 34th Infantry Division Band returned to the US.

As the 34th Infantry Division Band was created in 1944 with the consolidation of the 133rd Infantry Regiment Band (Iowa National Guard) and the 135th Infantry Regiment Band (Minnesota National Guard), the unit was divided back into its pre-war Iowa and Minnesota components.

Shortly after World War II, the 135th Infantry Regiment Band was reorganized in Minneapolis, Minnesota as part of the Minnesota National Guard and the 34th Infantry Division Band was reorganized as an element of the 34th Infantry Division, Iowa National Guard until the deactivation of the division in 1963.

=== Cold War ===
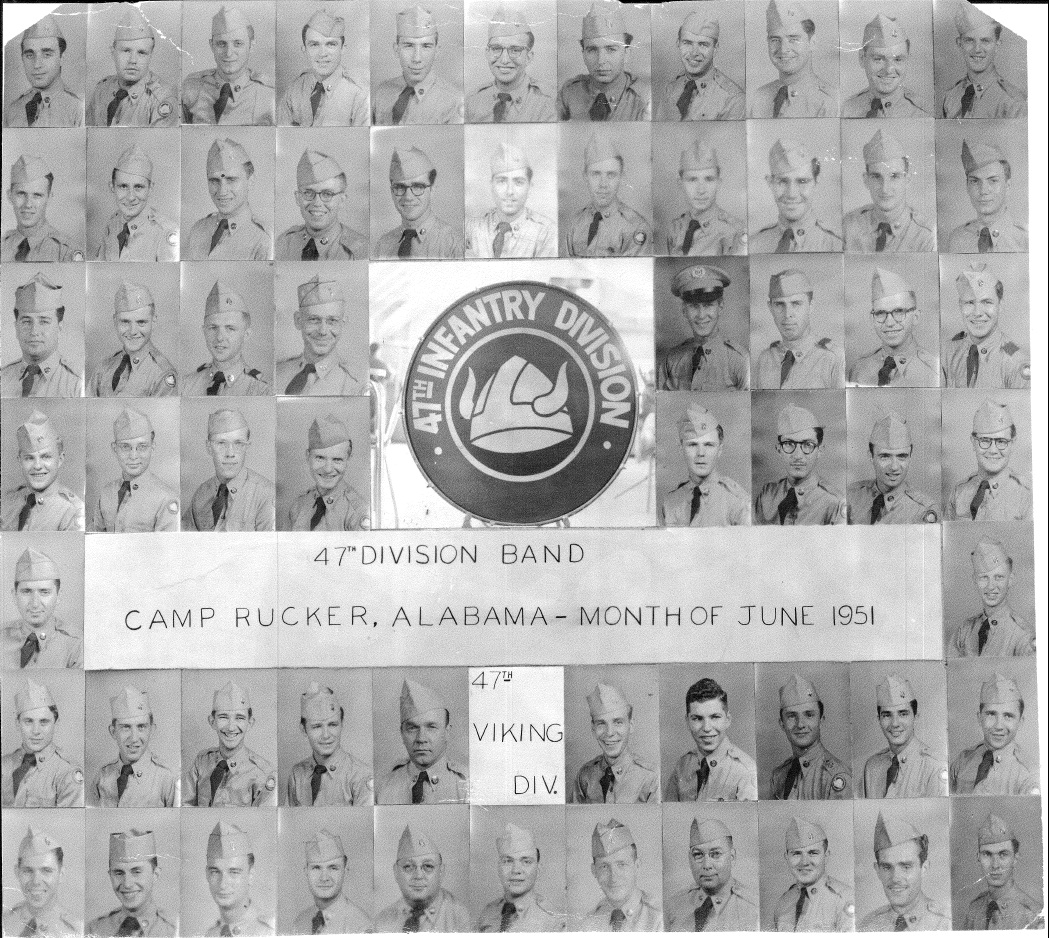
47th ID Band photo while mobilized to support the Korean War as a training division at Camp Rucker.

In accordance with post World War II national defense planning, the 47th Infantry "Viking" Division was created with units from the Minnesota and North Dakota National Guard on 10 June 1946 to support calls for a larger Guard force. As a result, the 135th Infantry Regiment Band was reconstituted in August 1945 and redesignated the 47th Infantry Division Band on 15 September 1946.^{β}

In response to the Korean War the newly formed 47th Infantry Division and 47th Infantry Division Band were activated for federal service on 16 January 1951, less than 5 years after their World War II deactivation. The band was moved with the entire 47th Infantry Division to Fort Rucker, Alabama in January 1951 with a mission to support the troops of the 47th Infantry Division as they prepared for combat in Korea. The 47th Infantry Division Band performed regularly during this time providing musical support in the form of concerts, parades, military change of command ceremonies, reviews and retreats. In addition, they appeared regularly around the surrounding cities and towns, including Dothan and Enterprise, Alabama. The 47th Infantry Division Band remained at Fort Rucker for nearly 2 years before being released from federal service on 2 December 1954 and returning to Minnesota.

The 47th Infantry Division Band continued to serve as the division band for the duration of the Cold War. The unit performed numerous high-profile missions to include

- President Lyndon Johnson Inauguration Parade
- National Veterans of Foreign Wars Convention
- National Governor's Convention
- Performance for Carl XVI Gustaf, King of Sweden

Renewed interest in Army traditions and history in the 1980s prompted the National Guard Bureau to return the 34th Infantry Division to the force structure. On 10 February 1991 the 34th Infantry Division was reactivated marking the return of the 34th Infantry Division Band. The unit would continue to serve as throughout the 1990s as the "Red Bull" division band.

=== Global War on Terrorism ===
The 34th Infantry Division Band saw an increased operations tempo as a result of numerous Minnesota National Guard post September 11th attacks mobilizations in support of peace keeping operations in Kosovo, Bosia stabilization operations, Operation Enduring Freedom and Operation Iraqi Freedom. The post-9/11 surge in public support and interest in the military made the 34th Infantry Division Band a popular and in-demand public relations asset.

The unit was also restructured as a part of the US Army Band's modular "Musical Performance Team" (MPT) model. The new modular concept called for smaller highly mobile teams that would operate independently of the band as a whole and specialize in any number of musical genres ranging from rock and country to jazz and chamber music. This reorganization of unit structure allowed the 34th Infantry Division Band to significantly enhance its capabilities and provide a cost-effective means to support to a wide variety of events.

In 2006 the city of Appleton, Minnesota approached the 34th Infantry Division Band to request the performance of a new song in honor of their substantial veteran community. In spring of 2006 the unit premiered the Daniel Kallman composition Streets of Honor in the city of Appleton, paying tribute to World War II era Red Bull soldiers. Later that year the 34th Infantry Division Band recorded its first full-length album featuring Streets of Honor, John Philip Sousa's Minnesota March and Boogie Woogie Bugle Boy in the style of Minnesota's own Andrews Sisters.

In early 2007 the 34th Infantry Division Band was awarded the Colonel George S. Howard Citation of Musical Excellence for Military Concert Bands.

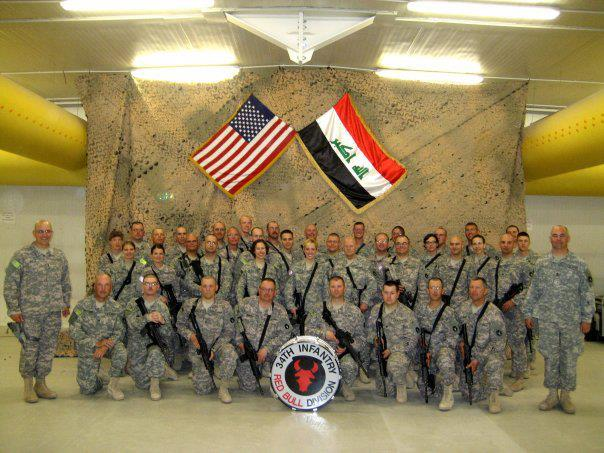
34th Infantry Division Band at COB Basra, Iraq while deployed in support of the Iraq War in 2009.

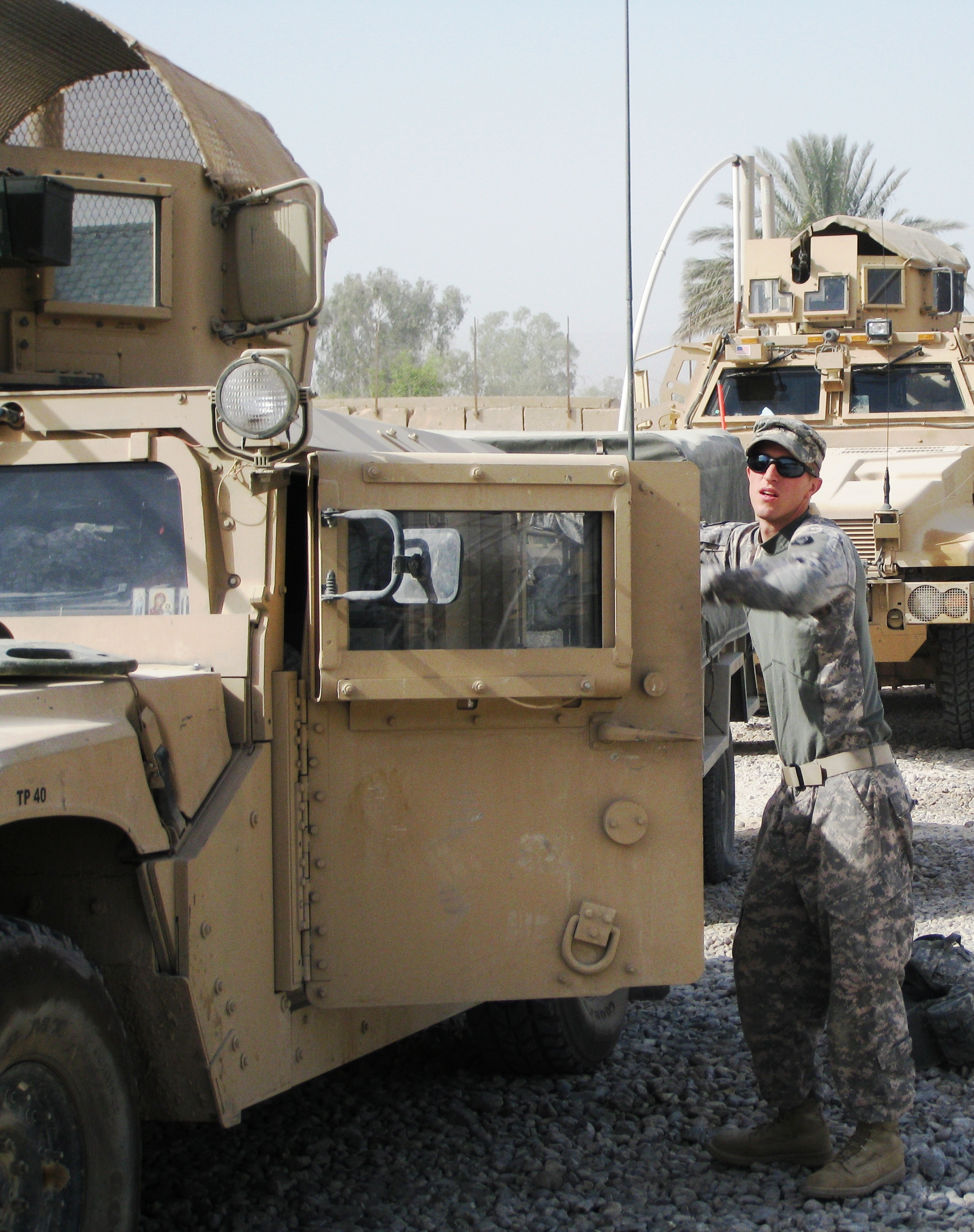
34th ID Band Soldier prepares to convoy at FOB Husiniyah, Iraq.

=== Operation Iraqi Freedom ===
The 34th Infantry Division Band was ordered to federal service in support of Operation Iraqi Freedom in 2009; their first combat deployment since World War II. While stationed at Contingency Operations Base, Basra from April 2009 to February 2010 the 34th Infantry Division Band's musical performance teams moved by air and ground convoy throughout Multi-National Division South, West and Baghdad performing concerts for coalition personnel and Iraqis while participating in numerous military and civil ceremonies.

==== Operation Iraqi Freedom Musical Performance Teams ====
- 34th Infantry Division "Red Bull" Concert Band (MPT-A)
- 34th Infantry Division "Red Bull" Ceremonial Band (MPT-A)
- 34th Infantry Division "Red Bull" Jazz Combo (MPT-A)
- "Echoes of Liberty" Ceremonial Band (MPT-B)
- "M-Saxteen" Saxophone Ensemble (MPT-B)
- "Red Bull Riders" Country Band (MPT-B)
- "Red Devil" Rock/Pop Band (MPT-C)
- "Hesco Jerks" Rock Band (MPT-D), previously named "Center Mass"
- "North Star" Brass Quintet (MPT-E)
- 34th Infantry Division Band Rear Detachment (Rosemount, Minnesota)

==== OIF Accomplishments ====
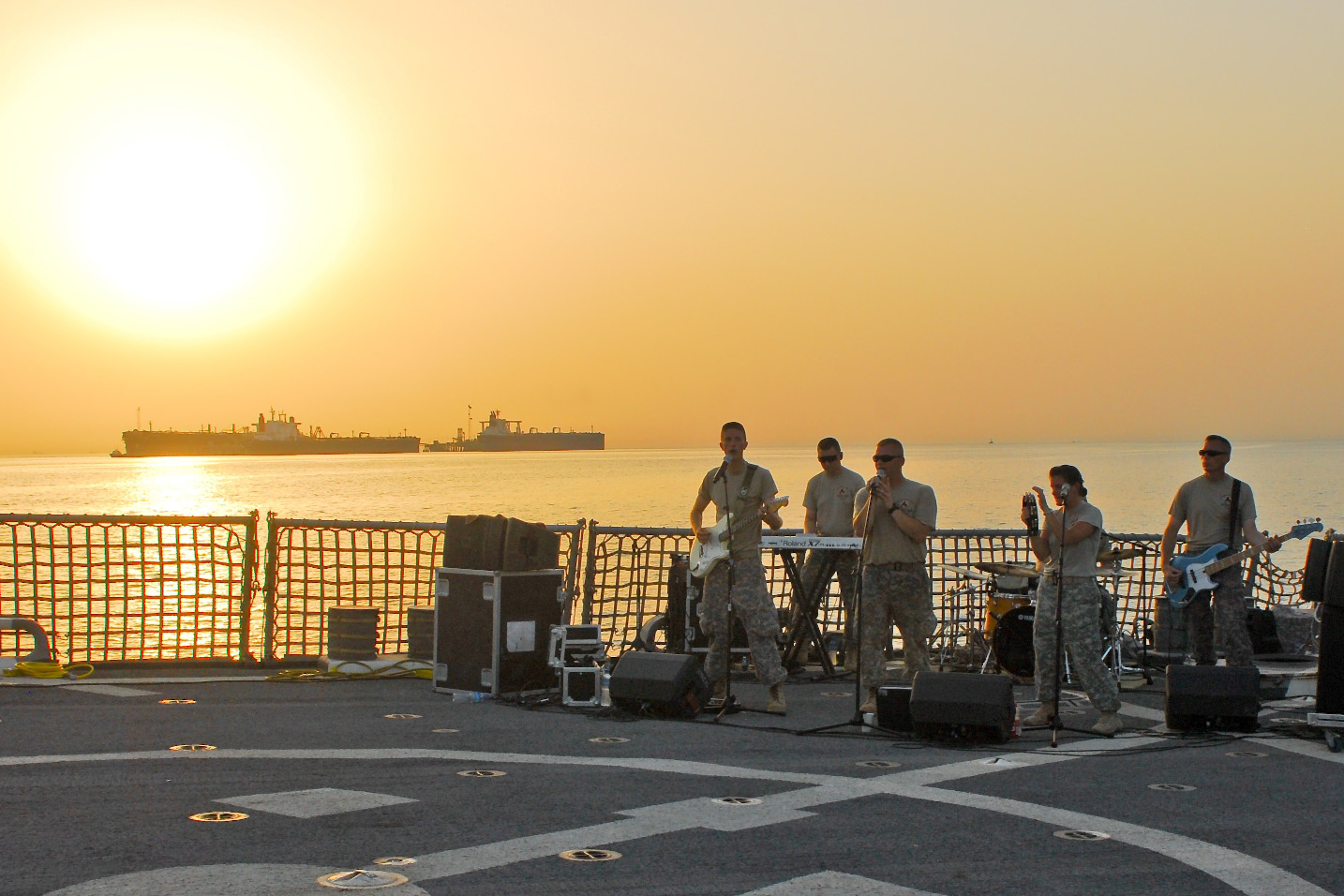
34th ID Band personnel perform aboard the USS Decatur.

In May 2009 the 34th Infantry Division Band recorded the Iraqi national anthem Mawtini in Arabic in an unused dining facility at COB Basra, Iraq. The unit is the first, and possibly only coalition military band to perform Mawtini in Iraq's predominate language. At a transfer of authority ceremony on 20 May 2009 a short recording of Mawtini was broadcast by Iraqi media throughout the country and later made into a highly successful ring tone. The unit's recording of Mawtini was later set to photos and distributed by US Psychological Operations and the US State Department in civil efforts and as a token of friendship between coalition personnel and Iraqi nationals. Additionally, the 34th Infantry Division recorded a full-length album of traditional Iraqi folk songs.

In recognition of Independence Day the 34th Infantry Division Band joined the 1st Cavalry Division Band, 25th Infantry Division Band and 56th Army Band for a combined tour of the Iraqi theater. The concert series is thought to be the only time 4 US Army organizational bands have performed together during a time of war.

In August 2009 the 34th Infantry Division Band's MPT-D "Hesco Jerks" performed on the Al Basra Oil Terminal located in the Persian Gulf. This performance is the only known musical or "USO" style entertainment event to have been held on the terminal. While on the same mission the band also performed on the USS Decatur (providing security for the oil terminal at the time) marking the first time a US Army Band had performed on a US Navy vessel at sea in support of wartime operations.

==== Return Home ====
The 34th Infantry Division Band was released from federal service in March 2010 and resumed normal operations by year's end. The unit was awarded the Meritorious Unit Commendation in recognition of their wartime service in support of Operation Iraqi Freedom. While deployed, the 34th Infantry Division Band performed 462 musical missions for an estimated audience of 600,000.

== 34th Infantry Division Band Lineage ==
=== Shared Lineage of the Iowa and Minnesota National Guard Bands ===
For official US Army lineage purposes, the only shared history recognized between the Iowa and Minnesota National Guard bands occurred during the consolidation of the 133rd and 135th Regimental bands into the 34th Infantry Division Band from 1944 to 1945. However, due to the inactivation of the 34th Infantry Division as a part of the Iowa National Guard in 1963 and its subsequent reactivation as a part of the Minnesota National Guard in 1991, both states claim peacetime service as the 34th Infantry Division Band.

== Honors ==
=== Campaigns ===
World War 1 (Without inscription)

Tunisia

Naples-Foggia

Anzio

Rome-Arno

North Apennines

Po Valley

Iraq

=== Decorations ===
French Croix de Guerre with Palm, Belvedere

Meritorious Unit Commendation, Iraq

== Commanders ==
CW3 James Baxter, Jr. (2017–present)

- CW2 David Stordalen (2013–2017)
- CW3 Trygve Skaar (1998–2013)
- CW4 Raymond Gove (1978–1998)
- CWO Garald Markly (1976–1978)
- CWO Donald Werdick (1973–1979)
- CWO Larry Temple (1970–1973)
- CWO Bruce J Hedblom (1960–1969)

== Notes ==
^αRick Atkinson notes in An Army at Dawn how desperate the situation at Faid Pass had become; "[COL]Drake authorized the regimental bandleader to organize firing squads if necessary to keep the lines intact." Aktinson goes on to describe casualties sustained by 168th Infantry Regiment Band in their determined defense recording "German machine-gunners and snipers fired at any movement; the band's bass drummer fell dead while carrying extra ammunition to the perimeter and a clarinetist was killed trying to avenge him."
^β34th Infantry Division continued to serve as an element of the Iowa National Guard until deactivated in 1968.
