= 850th Horizontal Engineer Company =

850th HEC
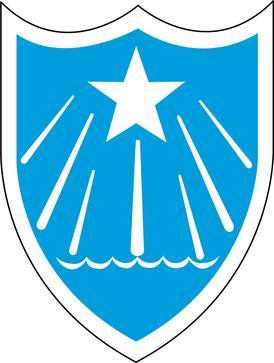
- Shoulder sleeve insignia
- Active: December 1967 – present
- Country: United States
- Branch: Minnesota Army National Guard
- Type: Engineer (HEC)
- Role: Engineer
- Size: Approx. 200
- Garrison/HQ: Cambridge, Minnesota (Headquarters)
- Nicknames: (Renegades); North Star
- Engagements: Operation Enduring Freedom

The 850th HEC ("Renegades") Company resides in Cambridge, Minn. The unit's primary mission is to provide command and control of engineer platoon effects that are necessary to conduct missions such as repair, maintain, construct air/ground lines of communication (LOC); emplace culverts; hauling; force protection; and limited clearing operations.

== History ==
The unit's history starts with being the 257th Military Police Company, based out of Cottage Grove, Minn., which deployed in 1990/1991 in support of Operation Desert Shield/Desert Storm. In 1995, the unit reorganized into Battery F, 151st Field Artillery, deploying soldiers to Europe and Southwest Asia in support of Operation Enduring Freedom and Operation Iraqi Freedom. In 2006, the unit reorganized once more to what is now the 850th Horizontal Engineer Company, part of the 682nd Engineer Battalion. In 2013 the unit deployed to Afghanistan. During this deployment soldiers built roads and culverts for locals and built observation points for security forces among other missions.

In 2019 the company restructured and traded a platoon with 851st VEC, they then changed the name of the unit to the 850th ECC (Engineer Construction Company).
