= 151st Field Artillery Regiment =

Minnesota army national guard unit

- Coat of arms
- Active: 1864–present
- Allegiance: United States
- Branch: Minnesota Army National Guard
- Type: Field artillery
- Role: Fire support
- Garrison/HQ: Montevideo, Minnesota, U.S.
- Nickname: Gopher Gunners
- Motto: En Evant (Forward)
- Engagements: American Civil War; World War I; World War II; War on Terror

Commanders
- Notable commanders: George E. Leach

Insignia
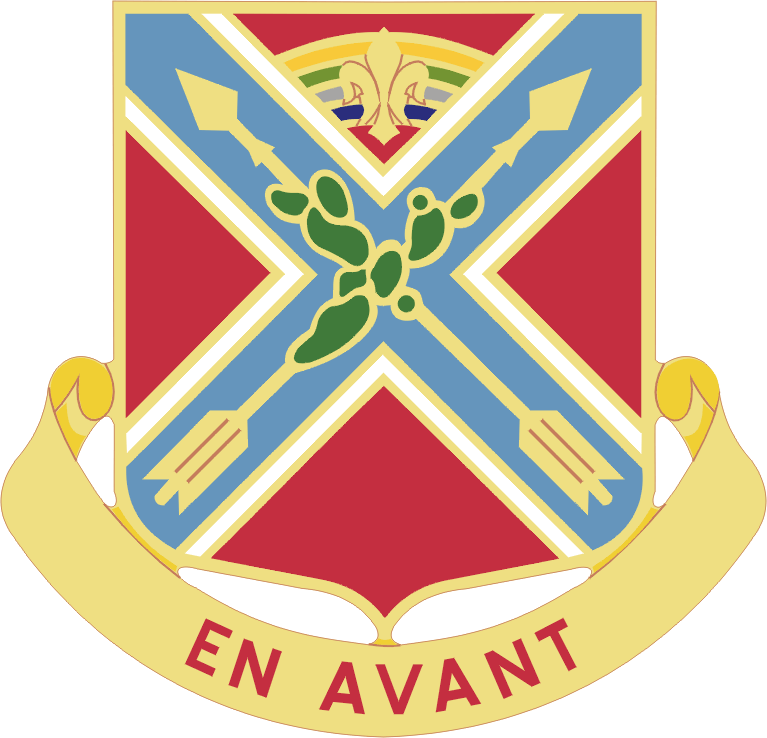
- Identification symbol

The 151st Field Artillery Regiment is an artillery regiment of the Minnesota Army National Guard, the unit is one of the oldest artillery units in Minnesota military history. Currently there is one battalion; the 1st Field Artillery Battalion, which is a fire battalion for the 115th Field Artillery Brigade. The 151st is historically part of the Minnesota Army National Guard's 34th Infantry Division.

== History ==
=== Civil War ===
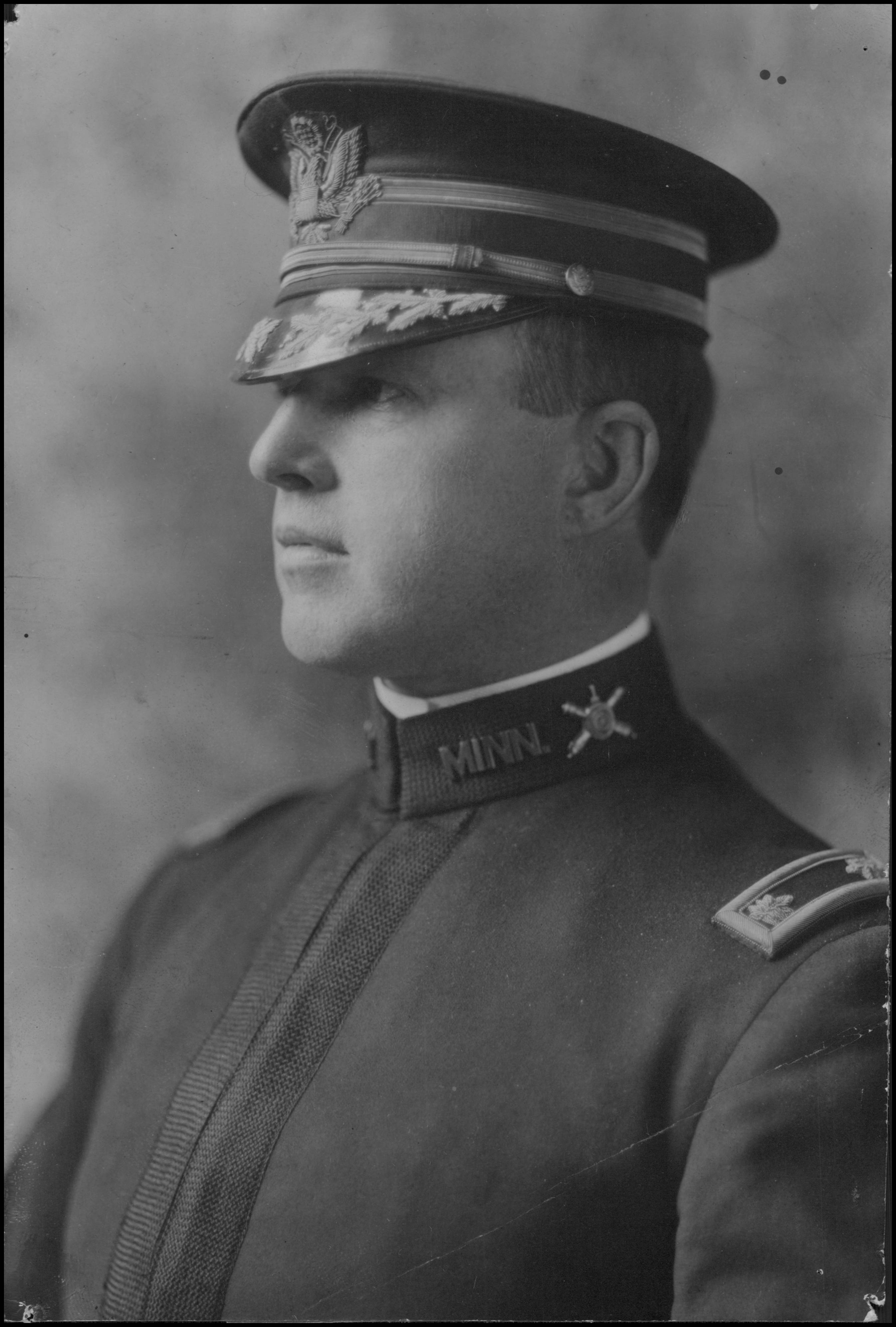
Colonel W. H. Donahue, Donahue was the Lieutenant Colonel of the old 1st Minnesota Field Artillery

The 151st Field Artillery Regiment traces its origins to the American Civil War where it was originally organized as the 1st Minnesota Heavy Artillery Regiment in 1864. Following the American Civil War the unit was transferred to the Minnesota militia, later the Minnesota National Guard, where it was organized as the 1st Minnesota Field Artillery in 1881.^{1-2} The nucleus of the 1st Minnesota Field Artillery was the Emmet Light Artillery which consisted of three officers, thirteen non-commissioned officers, and forty three privates.^{1-2}

=== WWI ===
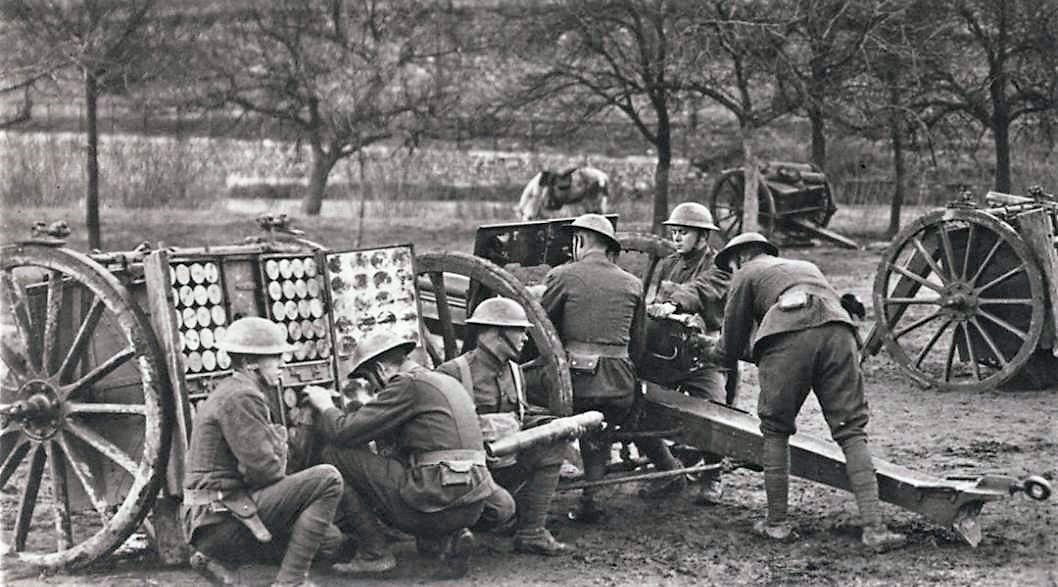
Soldiers from Battery F of the 151st Field Artillery, 42nd Division during the First World War

During World War I the 1st Minnesota Field Artillery was federalized and redesignated as the 151st Field Artillery Regiment on June 23, 1917.^{15} During the war the 151st was attached to the 42nd Infantry Division, also called the "Rainbow Division". The regiment was ordered to France on July 3, 1917,^{14} the regiment took part in the following campaigns; Lorraine, Champagne, Champagne-Marne, Aisne-Marne, St. Mihiel, and Meuse-argonne. During the units deployment to France the 151st was armed with the French Canon de 75 modèle 1897 and provided fire support for the rest of the division. The 151st was the only unit from Minnesota to see combat during the conflict. The 151st returned to the United States on May 10, 1919 where it was demobilized.

=== WWII ===
During World War II the 151st remobilized on February 10, 1941 and attached to the 34th Infantry Division and equipped with the 105 mm Howitzer M2. The 151st was temporarily attached to the 36th Infantry Division while landing in Salerno during Operation Avalanche, afterwards it rejoined the 34th Infantry Division where it fought in the Italian campaign. The 151st received battle honors for the following campaigns during World War II; Tunisia, Naples Foggia, Anzio, Rome-Arno, North Apennines, and the Po Valley.

=== Korean War ===
During the Korean War the 151st was attached to the 47th Infantry Division and sent to Fort Rucker as part of the Far East Command.

=== Bosnia and the Global War on Terror ===
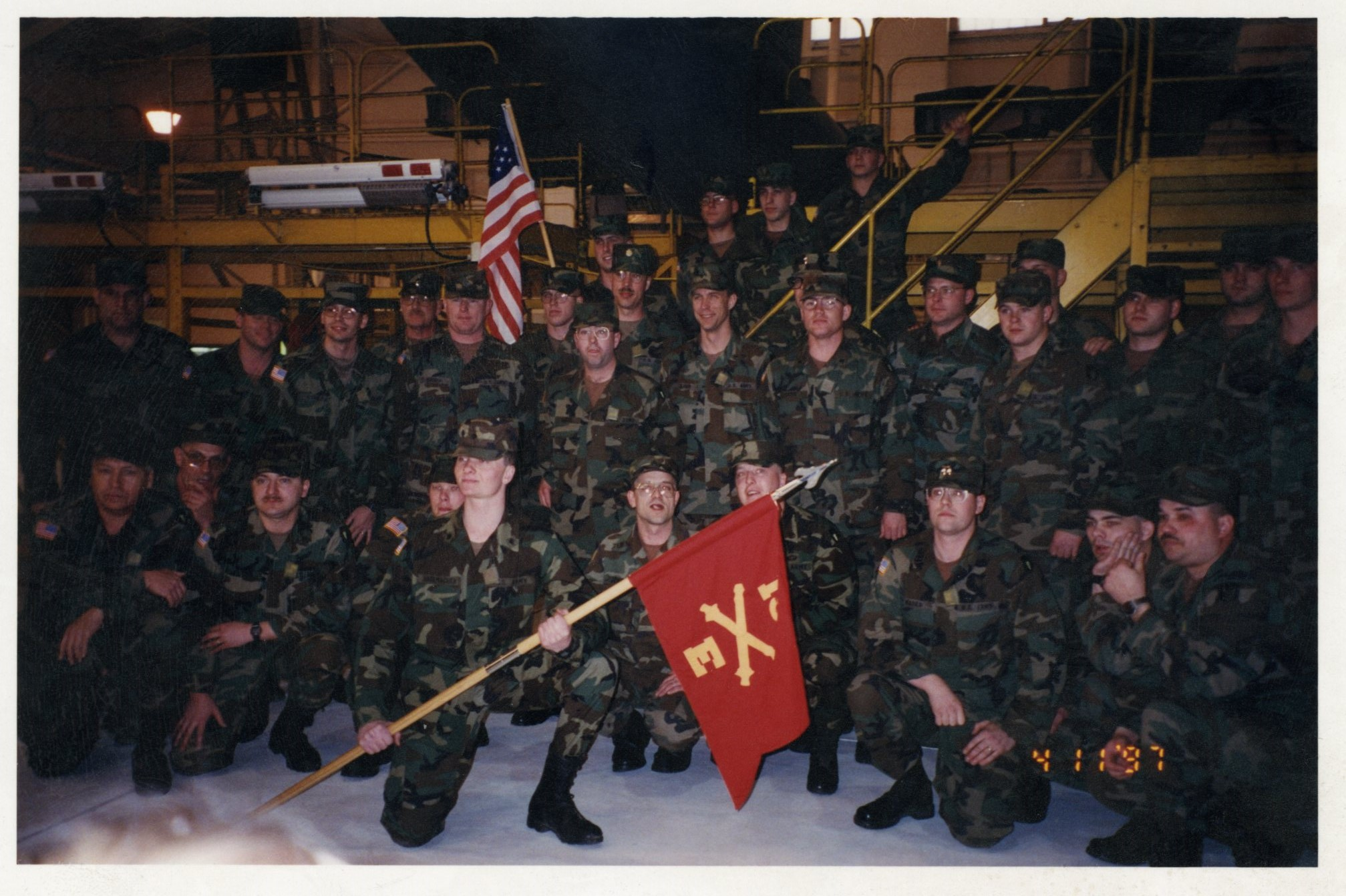
151st Artillery’s E Battery, which was deployed to Bosnia and Herzegovina in the 1990's in support of Operation Joint Guard

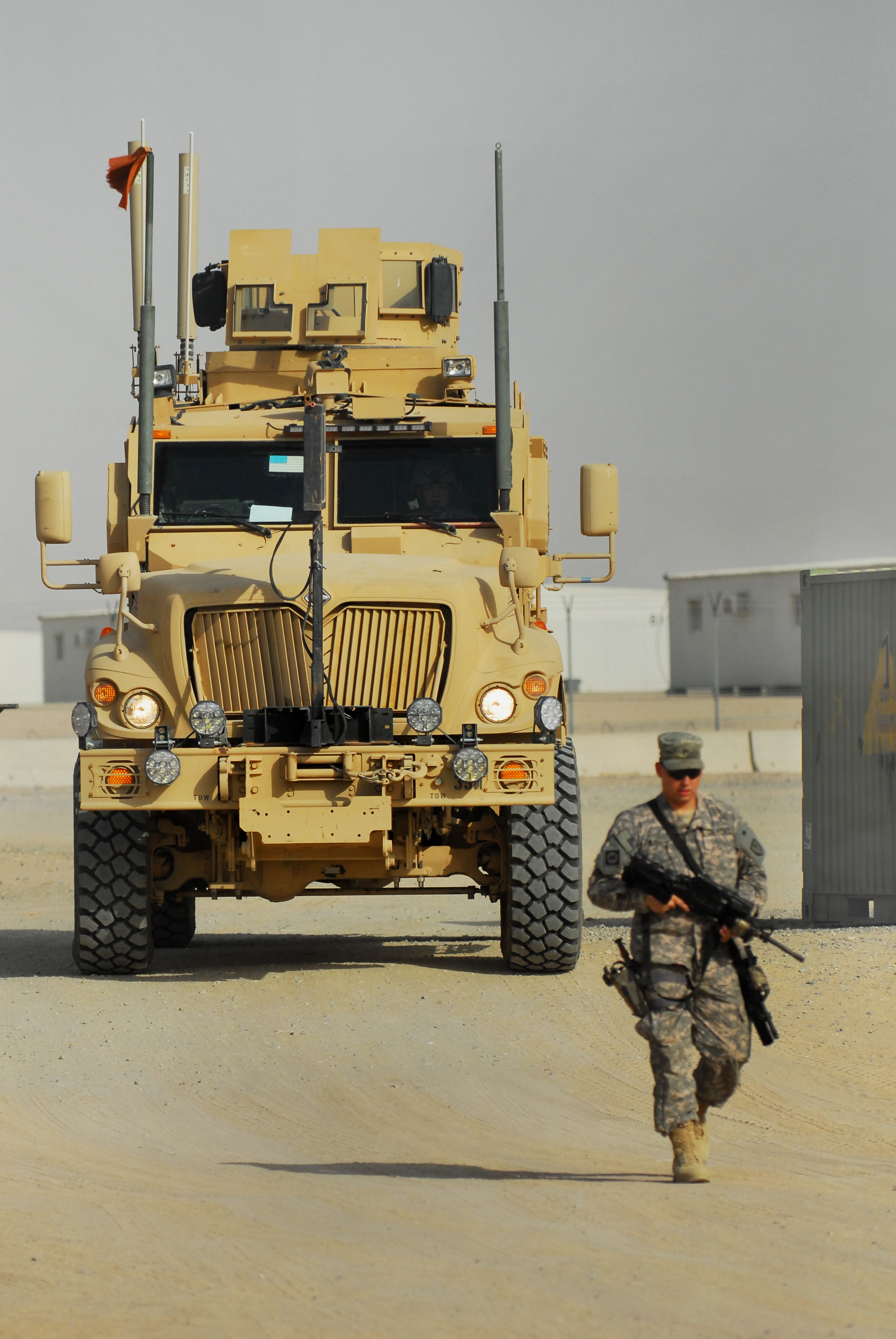
Convoy escort teams of the 1st Battalion 151st Field Artillery, 115th Fires Brigade in Kuwait

Battery E of the 151st was deployed during the Bosnian War as part of the Kosovo Force from September 1996 to April 1997. The majority of the 151st was deployed during the Iraq War from 2005 to 2006, and to Kuwait and Iraq from 2009 to 2010. The 1st Battalion of the 151st is headquartered at Montevideo, Minnesota. The regiment is currently equipped with the M777 howitzer, although some training units still utilize the older 155 mm gun M1 for firepower training.

== Modern organization ==
The regiment is currently organized as follows:

- Headquarters and Service Battery - Montevideo, Minnesota
- Headquarters and Headquarters Support
  - Detachment 1 - Appleton, Minnesota
- Battery A - Marshall, Minnesota
- Battery B - Madison, Minnesota
  - Battery B detachment - Olivia, Minnesota
- Battery C - Morris, Minnesota
  - Battery C detachment - Ortonville, Minnesota

== Honors ==
=== Campaign participation credit ===
- Tennessee, 1864
- Tennessee, 1865
- Champaign-Marne
- Aisne-Marne
- St. Mihiel
- Meuse-Argonne
- Champaign 1918
- Lorraine 1918
- Algeria-French Morocco (with arrowhead)
- Tunisia
- Naples-Foggia (with arrowhead)
- Anzio
- Rome-Arno
- North Apennies
- Po Valley

=== Awards ===
- Meritorious Unit Commendation (Army), Streamer embroidered IRAQ 2005-2006
- Croix de Guerre with Palm

Battery E (Anoka) is additionally entitled to:

- Meritorious Unit Commendation (Army), Streamer embroidered IRAQ 2005-2006
- Belgian Fourragere 1940

== See also ==
- 34th Infantry Division
- 115th Field Artillery Brigade
- Minnesota Army National Guard
- Minnesota National Guard
