= Rodney R. Hannula =

United States Army general

- Military career
- Allegiance: United States
- Branch: United States Army; Minnesota Army
- Service years: 1961-2000 (Army)
- Rank: Major General
- Commands: 34th Infantry Division
- Awards: Legion of Merit

Rodney R. Hannula is a retired major general in the National Guard of the United States.

== Biography ==
Hannula graduated from high school in Saxon, Wisconsin in 1958. In 1971, he graduated from what is now the University of Wisconsin–La Crosse and the University of Minnesota with an MBA.

== Career ==
Hannula was first commissioned as an officer in the Wisconsin Army National Guard in 1961 after having previously been an enlisted man. From 1998 to 2000, he was in command of the 34th Infantry Division. His retirement was effective as of September 30, 2000.

Awards he received include the Legion of Merit with two oak leaf clusters, the Meritorious Service Medal with two oak leaf clusters, the Army Commendation Medal, the National Defense Service Medal with a service star, the Army Reserve Components Achievement Medal, the Armed Forces Reserve Medal with a silver hourglass device, and the Army Service Ribbon.
