= 347th Regional Support Group =

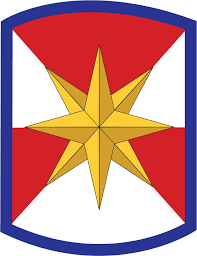
- Active: 1959 - present
- Country: United States
- Branch: United States Army National Guard
- Role: Support
- Size: Group (Brigade)
- Part of: Minnesota Army National Guard
- Garrison/HQ: Brooklyn Park, Minn.
- Mottos: Victory, Victory, Victory
- Website: https://mn.gov/mnng/units/347-regional-support-group/

Commanders
- Current commander: COL Joel Stamp
- Command Sergeant Major: CSM Thomas Smith

Insignia
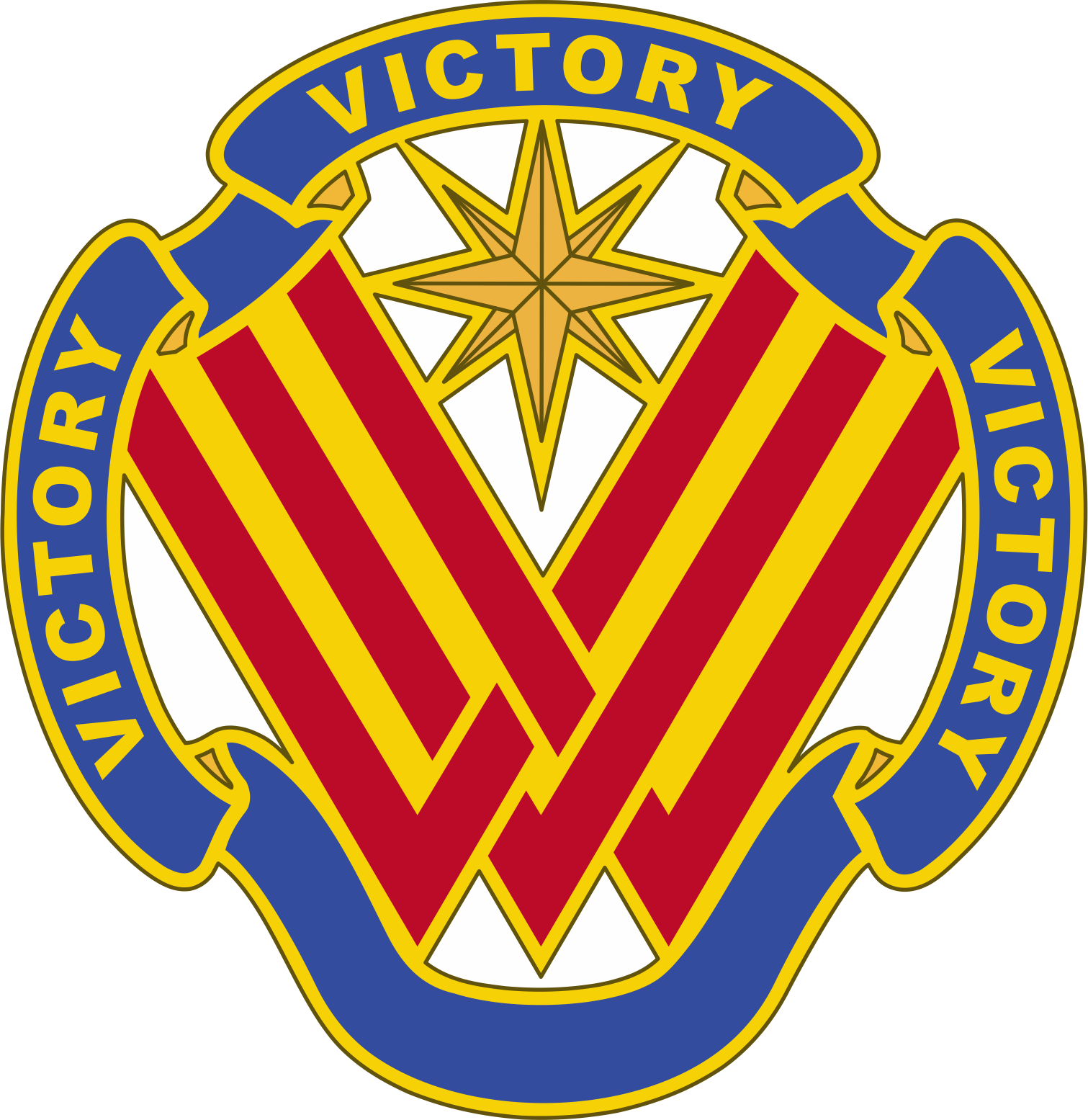
- 347th Regional Support Group DUI

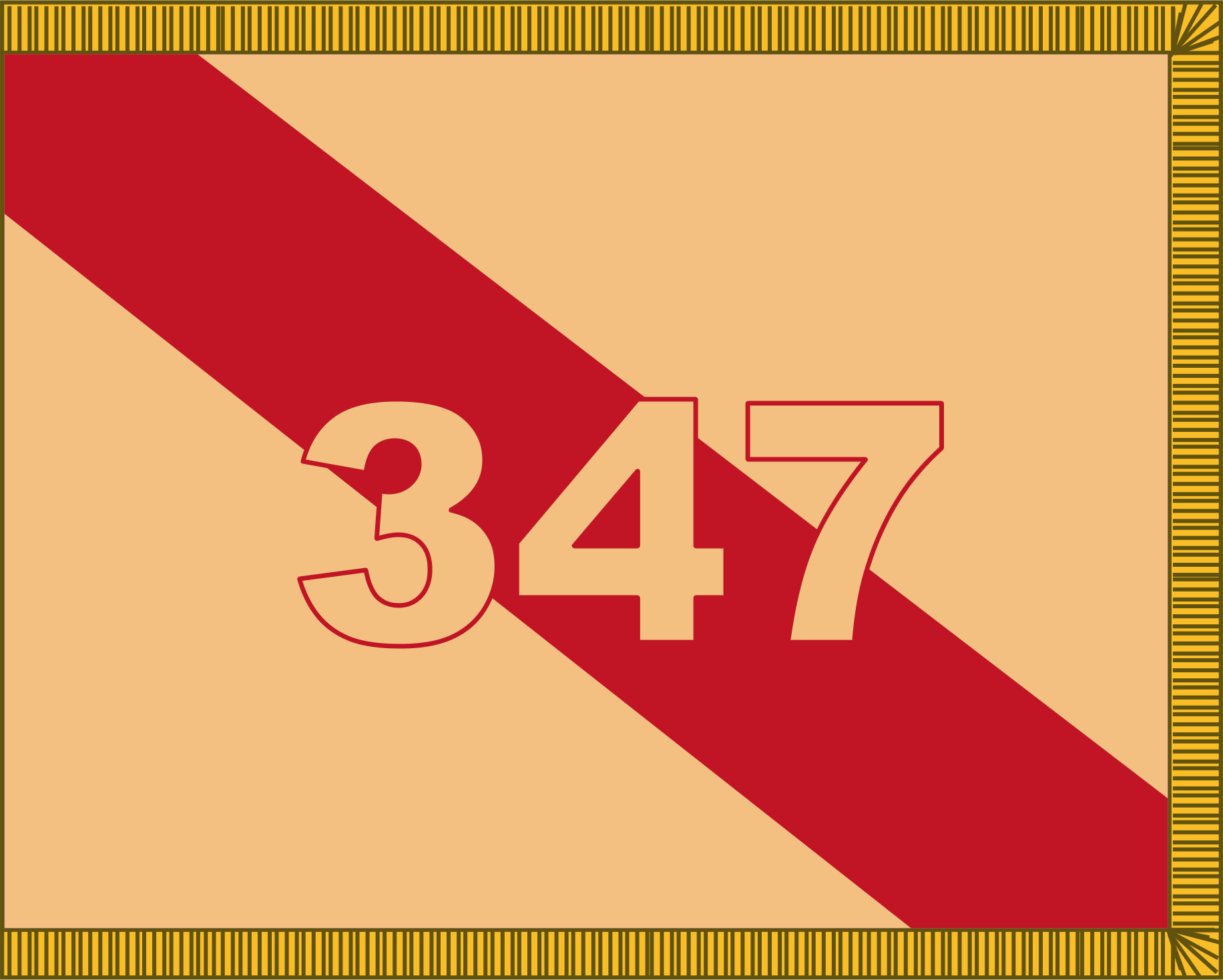
- 347th Regional Support Group Flag

The 347th Regional Support Group is a unit of the Minnesota Army National Guard. The unit was raised in 1959 at Minneapolis as the HHD 47th Infantry Division Trains. It was redesignated in 1963 as the HHB 47th Infantry Division Support Command. The unit moved to Bloomington, Minn. In 1991 it was redesignated as the HHC 34th Infantry Division Support Command. It was finally redesignated 347th Support Group in 2007 and moved to Brooklyn Park, Minn. in 2017.

In 2018-2019, the unit was deployed to Camp Arifjan, Kuwait to support Operation Enduring Freedom. In 2022, the unit was deployed to Afghanistan during earning at least one Global War on Terror campaign streamer. The same year, they were also deployed to Iraq as a part of Task Force Victory, stationed at Al Asad Air Base for Combined Joint Task Force-Operation Inherent Resolve.

== Units ==
- 347th Regional Support Group, in Brooklyn Park, Minnesota
  - Headquarters and Headquarters Company, 347th Regional Support Group, in Brooklyn Park
  - 147th Human Resources Company, in Arden Hills
  - 147th Financial Management Support Detachment, in Brooklyn Park
  - 204th Medical Company (Area Support), in Cottage Grove
  - 224th Transportation Company (Light-Medium Truck), in Austin
  - 247th Financial Management Support Detachment, in Arden Hills
  - 324th Transportation Company (Light-Medium Truck), in Olivia
    - Detachment 1, 324th Transportation Company (Light-Medium Truck), in Redwood Falls
  - 434th Ordnance Company (Support Maintenance), at Camp Ripley
  - 1903rd Support Detachment (Contracting Team), at Camp Ripley
  - 1904th Support Detachment (Contracting Team), at Camp Ripley
  - 1347th Division Sustainment Support Battalion, in Bloomington (part of 34th Division Sustainment Brigade)
    - Headquarters and Headquarters Company, 1347th Division Sustainment Support Battalion, in Bloomington
    - Company A (Composite Supply Company), 1347th Division Sustainment Support Battalion, in Fairfield (IA) (Iowa Army National Guard)
      - Detachment 1, Company A, 1347th Division Sustainment Support Battalion, in Dubuque (IA) (Iowa Army National Guard)
      - Detachment 2, Company A, 1347th Division Sustainment Support Battalion, in Clinton (IA) (Iowa Army National Guard)
    - Company B (Support Maintenance Company), 1347th Division Sustainment Support Battalion, in Knoxville (IA) (Iowa Army National Guard)
      - Detachment 1, Company B, 1347th Division Sustainment Support Battalion, in Oskaloosa (IA) (Iowa Army National Guard)
    - Company C (Composite Truck Company), 1347th Division Sustainment Support Battalion, in Duluth
    - Detachment 1, Company C, 1347th Division Sustainment Support Battalion, in Chisholm

== Leaders ==
Commanders
- COL Joel Stamp, 2025 – present
- COL Jesse C. Johnson, 2023 – 2024
- COL Stephen Burggraff, 2020 – 2022
- COL Stephen E. Schemenauer, Sept. 15, 2017 – 2019
- COL Lowell E. Kruze, 2015 – 2016
- COL Johanna P. Clyborne, 2013 – 2015
- COL Steven Hanson, 2011 – 2013
- COL Patrick Dwyer, 2009
- COL Shawn P. Kempenich, 2006 –
- COL Charles Parins, – 2006
- COL Robert L. Bode, 1990 – 1992

Command Sergeants Major

- CSM Thomas Smith, 2025 – present
- CSM Christian Hudson, 2021 – 2024
- CSM Shannon Froiland, 2020 – 2021
- CSM Juan S. Esquivel, 2018 – 2019
- CSM Marcus L. Erickson, 2014 – 2018
- CSM Erik R. Arne, 2011 – 2014
- CSM Douglas Hanson, 2009
- CSM Michael Sands, Dec. 2006 – 2007
- CSM John McNamara, – 2006
