= 734th Regional Support Group =

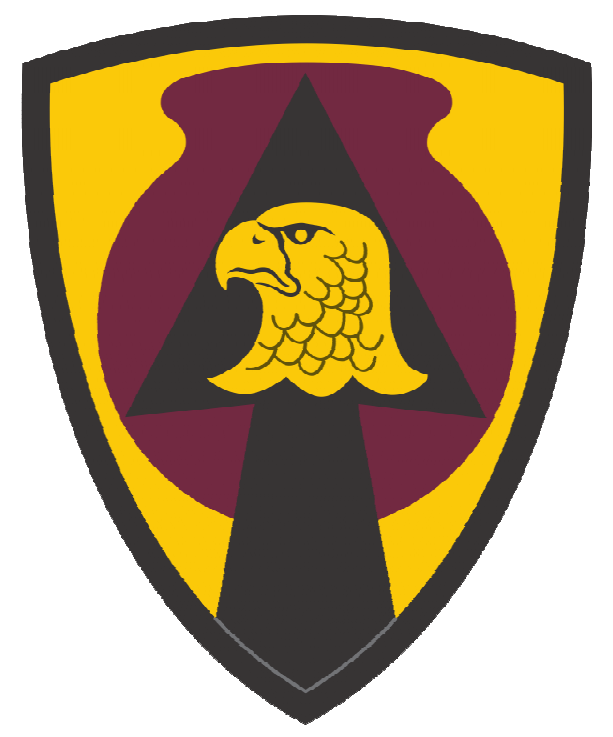
- Active: 1942-present
- Country: United States
- Branch: United States Army National Guard
- Role: Support
- Size: Group (Brigade)
- Part of: Iowa Army National Guard
- Garrison/HQ: Camp Dodge Johnston, Iowa
- Motto: Virtue Honor Reward

Commanders
- Current commander: COL Anthony J. Smithhart II
- Command Sergeant Major: CSM Michael Mally

Insignia
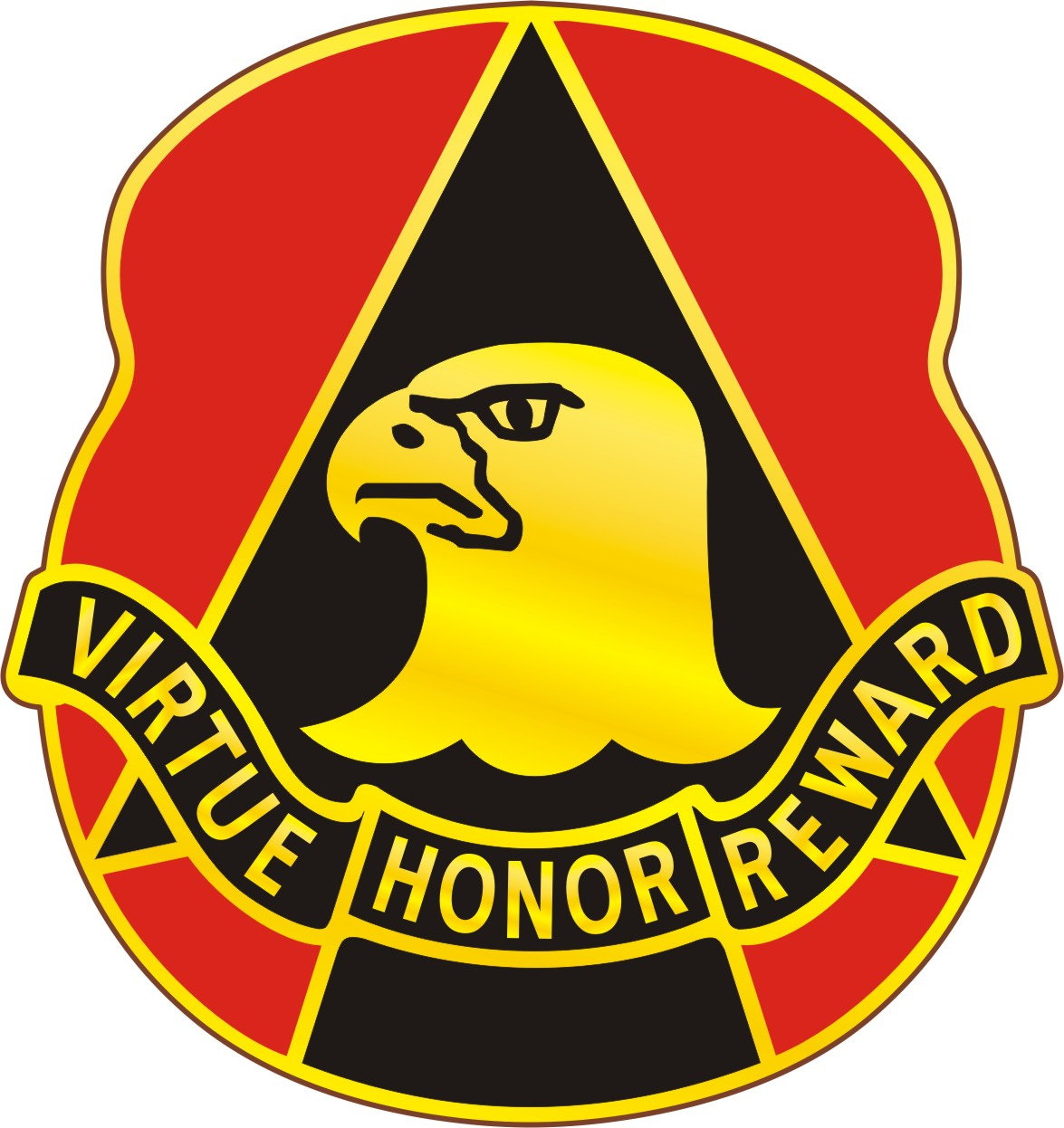
- 734th Regional Support Group DUI

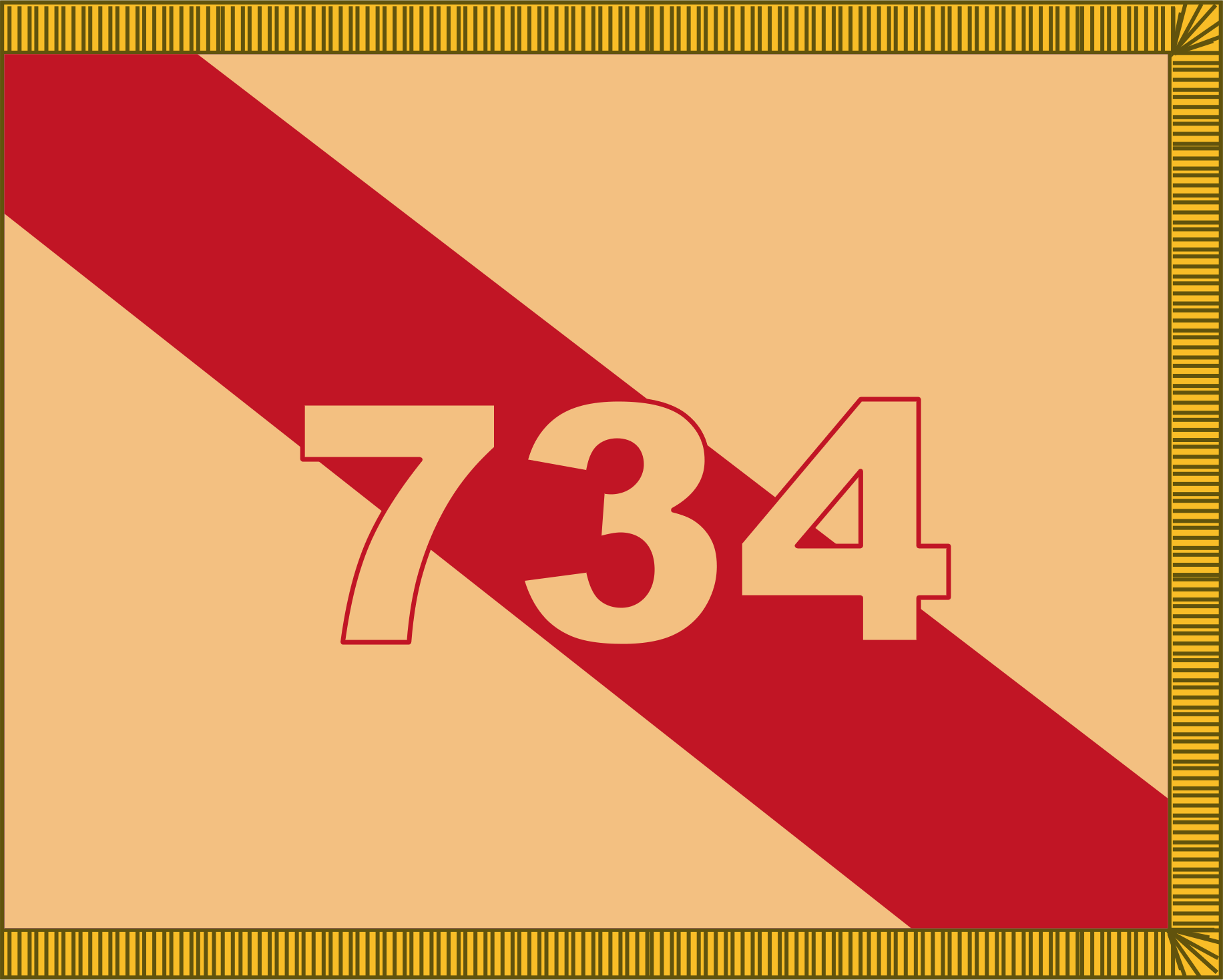
- 734th Regional Support Group Flag

The 734th Regional Support Group is a unit of the Iowa Army National Guard that has a long lineage. The unit was originally raised in 1921 in Des Moines as HHC and Company C 1st Battalion, 168th Infantry Regiment of the 34th Infantry Division. The unit was federalized in 1941 and earned six campaign streamers in World War II: Tunisia, Naples-Foggia, Anzio, Rome-Arno, North Apennines and Po Valley plus a Presidential Unit Citation and the French Croix de Guerre with Palm (Belvedere). The unit returned to Iowa after the war.

The 734th RSG's mission is to provide logistics support to Iowa National Guard units including rail transport, food service and medical services. This includes deployments to the Joint Readiness Training Center in Louisiana and the Middle East. On 17 August 2026, the 734 RSG took over command of Operation European Assure, Deter, and Reinforce from the 510th RSG at Camp Kościuszko, Poznań, Poland.

== Subordinate Units ==
Des Moines

- 734th Headquarters Company
- 186th Military Police Company (Johnston, IA)
- HHC 185th Combat Sustainment Support Battalion (Johnston, IA)
- HHC 1034th Combat Sustainment Support Battalion (Cedar Rapids, IA)
- 3655th Classification and Inspection Company (Johnston, IA)
