= 34th Infantry Division (United States) =

US Army National Guard formation

- 34th Infantry Division's shoulder sleeve insignia
- Active: 18 July 1917–18 February 1918; 14 July 1924–3 November 1945; 19 November 1946–present
- Country: United States
- Branch: United States Army National Guard
- Type: Infantry
- Size: Division
- Garrison/HQ: Arden Hills, Minnesota
- Nicknames: "Red Bull" "The Sandstorm Division"
- Mottos: "Attack, Attack, Attack!"
- March: "March of the Red Bull Legions"
- Engagements: World War I; World War II; Tunisia; Naples-Foggia; Rome-Arno; North Apennines; Po Valley; War on terror; Afghanistan War; Iraq War
- Decorations: French Croix de guerre with Palm

Commanders
- Current commander: Brigadier General Joseph Sharkey
- Notable commanders: Charles W. Ryder; Charles L. Bolte; Michael Wickman

Insignia
- Distinctive unit insignia

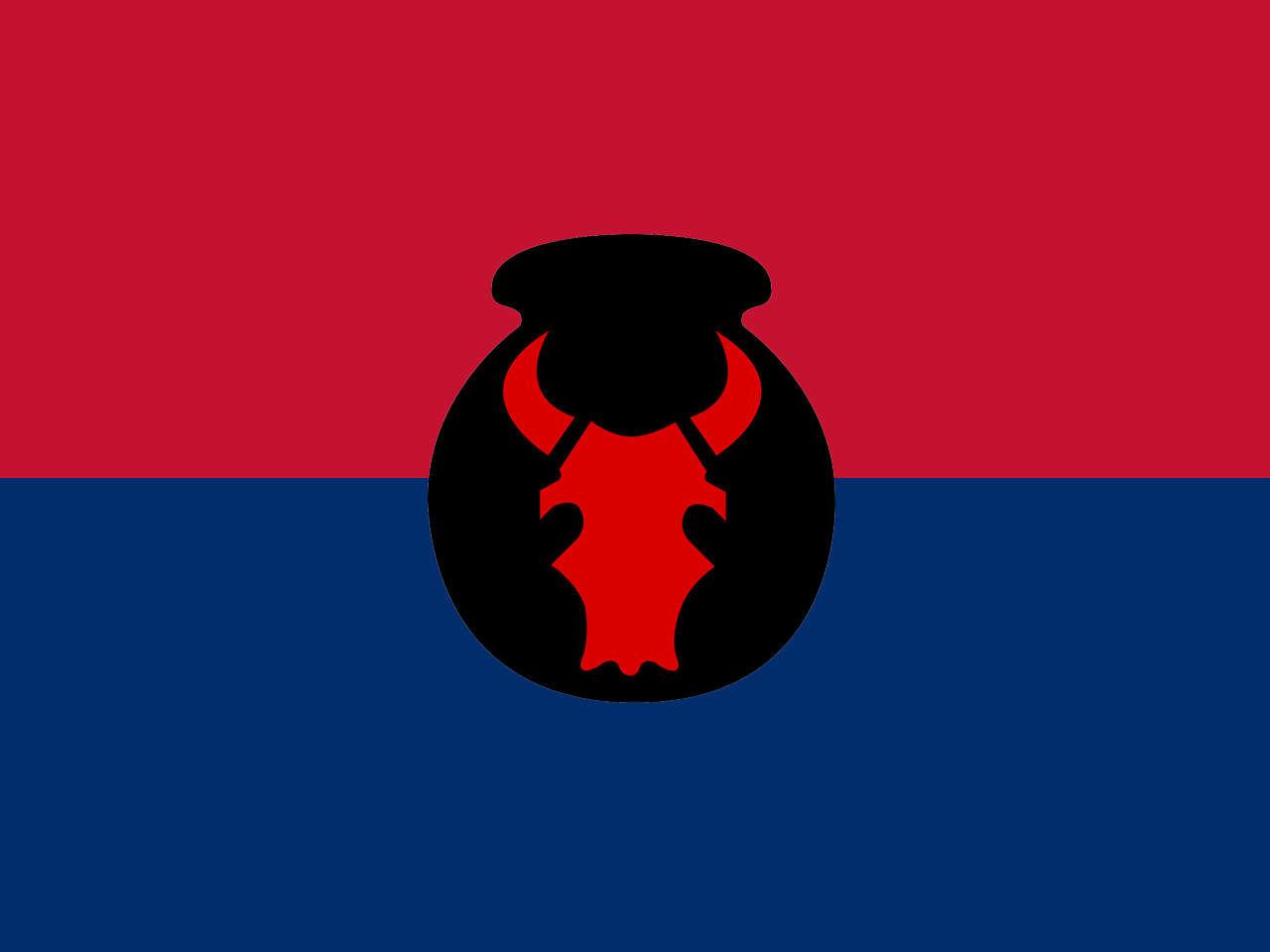
- Flag of the United States Army 34th Infantry Division

The 34th Infantry Division is an infantry division of the United States Army, part of the National Guard. It has the Special Designation "Red Bull." Established on 18 July 1917 from National Guard units of Iowa, Minnesota, Nebraska, North Dakota, and South Dakota, the division trained at Camp Cody, New Mexico, during World War I. It arrived in France in October 1918, too late to see combat, and was disbanded on 18 February 1919. The division's shoulder sleeve insignia, designed at Camp Cody by American regionalist artist Marvin Cone, superimposed a red steer skull over a black Mexican water jug called an "olla," evoking the desert training grounds. Originally known as the "Sandstorm Division," the unit later adopted the nickname "Red Bulls."

In World War II, the 34th was the first American division deployed to Europe, arriving at Belfast, Northern Ireland, on 26 January 1942. The division fought in North Africa from Operation Torch in November 1942, capturing Hill 609 in Tunisia, before moving to Italy. There it fought at Salerno, through the Winter Line, at Monte Cassino, the Anzio beachhead, and the Gothic Line, before capturing Bologna in April 1945. The division accumulated 517 days of front-line combat across six major campaigns, suffered 16,401 battle casualties, and was awarded the French Croix de Guerre with Palm.

Inactivated on 3 November 1945, the division was reformed within the Iowa and Nebraska National Guards in 1946–1947. The 47th Infantry Division was separately activated for Minnesota and North Dakota in the division's former area. Both divisions were disbanded in 1963. On 10 February 1991, the 47th Division was "reflagged" as the 34th Infantry Division, restoring the Red Bull designation.

Since October 2001, the division has deployed personnel for homeland security duties in the continental United States, combat operations in Afghanistan and Iraq, and peacekeeping missions in Bosnia and Herzegovina and Kosovo. The division draws units from multiple states, with the Minnesota and Iowa National Guards forming its core.

== History ==
=== World War I ===
The division was established as the 34th Division of the National Guard on 18 July 1917, consisting of units from Iowa, Minnesota, Nebraska, North Dakota, and South Dakota. Camp Cody, New Mexico, was selected as its training site on 3 August. On 5 August, the National Guards of Iowa, Minnesota, Nebraska, and the Dakotas were drafted into federal service. The units that were to comprise the division began concentrating at Camp Cody on 19 August. On 25 August 1917, the division was placed under the command of Major General Augustus P. Blocksom, who was succeeded by Brigadier General Frank G. Mauldin briefly on 18 September 1917, but was back in command by 10 December 1917.

A controversy arose when Brigadier General Frederick Emil Resche, the commander of the division's 68th Infantry Brigade and a native of Germany who had long resided in Duluth, Minnesota, was accused of anti-American sentiments. No evidence was forthcoming, but Resche was still relieved of command in April 1918, supposedly for inefficiency.

Brigadier General Frank G. Mauldin took command. Systematic training began on 29 October 1917, and during October and November, 5,000 draftees arrived from Camp Dodge, Iowa, and Camp Funston, Kansas, while personnel losses up to and including 10 May 1918 aggregated about 4,000 men. In June 1918, nearly all of the division's trained personnel were sent overseas to meet the requirements of the AEF automatic replacement system. Replacements arrived in August, the majority drawn from Arizona, Colorado, Kansas, New Mexico, Oklahoma, and Texas. The 34th Division arrived in France in October 1918, but it was too late for the division to be sent to the front, as the end of hostilities was near. Most personnel were sent through the AEF replacement system to other units to support their final operations. The Armistice with Germany was signed the following month.

Brigadier General John Alexander Johnston took command 26 October 1918. Charles Dudley Rhodes took command in December and led the division until its departure for the United States in January 1919. The 34th was disbanded on 18 February 1919 at Camp Grant, Illinois.

The division takes its name from the shoulder sleeve insignia designed for a 1917 training camp contest by American regionalist artist Marvin Cone, who was then a soldier enlisted in the unit. Cone's design evoked the desert training grounds of Camp Cody by superimposing a red steer skull over a black Mexican water jug called an "olla," while the unit was called the "Sandstorm Division." German troops in World War II called the 34th Infantry Division's soldiers "Red Devils" and "Red Bulls," and the division later officially adopted the divisional nickname Red Bulls.

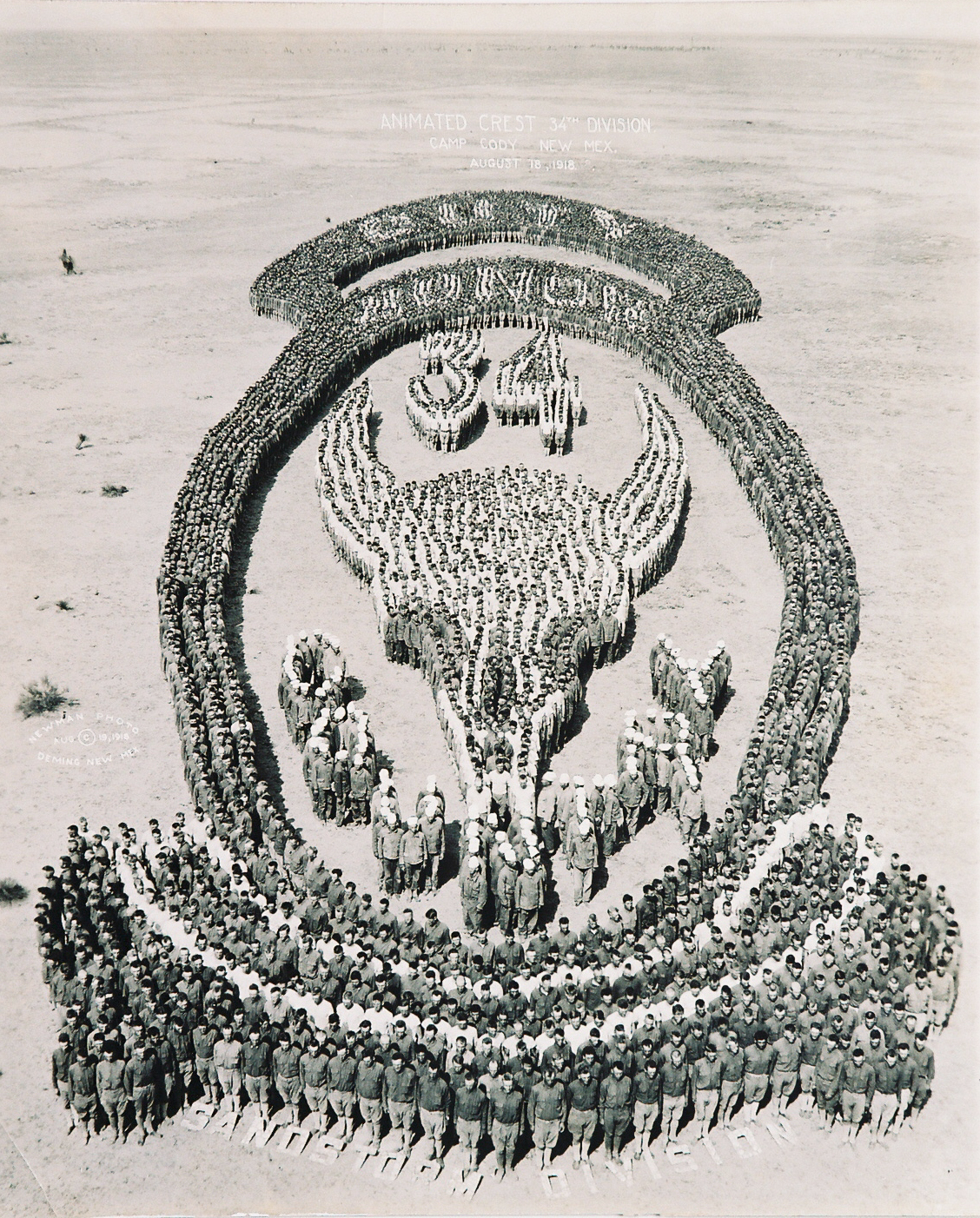
34th ID Soldiers at Camp Cody, NM on 18 August 1918.

==== World War I order of battle ====
Units of the 34th Division during World War I included:

- Headquarters, 34th Division
- 67th Infantry Brigade (Headquarters, 1st Brigade, Iowa National Guard)
  - 133rd Infantry Regiment (1st Iowa Infantry, Troop C, 1st Iowa Cavalry, Machine Gun Company, 4th Nebraska Infantry, 3rd Battalion, 2nd Iowa Infantry, and Separate Company, Iowa Infantry)
  - 134th Infantry Regiment (5th Nebraska Infantry)
  - 126th Machine Gun Battalion (2nd Battalion, 2nd Iowa Infantry and Machine Gun Company, 6th Nebraska Infantry)
- 68th Infantry Brigade (Headquarters, Minnesota National Guard Brigade)
  - 135th Infantry Regiment (1st Minnesota Infantry)
  - 136th Infantry Regiment (2nd Minnesota Infantry)
  - 127th Machine Gun Battalion (2nd Squadron, South Dakota Cavalry and individual transfers from 1st Squadron, South Dakota Cavalry)
- 59th Field Artillery Brigade
  - 125th Field Artillery Regiment (75 mm) (3rd Minnesota Infantry, less Machine Gun Company)
  - 126th Field Artillery Regiment (75 mm) (1st Iowa Field Artillery)
  - 127th Field Artillery Regiment (155 mm) (4th Nebraska Infantry, less Machine Gun Company)
  - 109th Trench Mortar Battery (Headquarters Company less band, Supply Company, and Machine Gun Company, 2nd Iowa Infantry)
- 125th Machine Gun Battalion (Troop B, 1st Iowa Cavalry, Machine Gun Company, 3rd Minnesota Infantry, and 1st Battalion, 2nd Iowa Infantry)
- 109th Engineer Regiment (1st Separate Battalion Iowa Engineers, Sanitary Detachment, 2nd Iowa Infantry, Headquarters Company (less band), Supply Company, and 2nd Battalion, 6th Nebraska Infantry)
- 109th Field Signal Battalion (Company C, Iowa Signal Corps, and Company B, Nebraska Signal Corps)
- Headquarters Troop, 34th Division (Troop A, 1st Iowa Cavalry)
- 109th Train Headquarters and Military Police (1st Battalion, 6th Nebraska Infantry, less Company D)
  - 109th Ammunition Train (Iowa ammunition train, Troop D, 1st Iowa Cavalry)
  - 109th Supply Train (3rd Battalion, less Company I, 6th Nebraska Infantry)
  - 109th Engineer Train (Company I, 6th Nebraska Infantry)
  - 109th Sanitary Train
    - 133rd, 134th, 135th, and 136th Ambulance Companies and Field Hospitals (1st and 2nd Iowa Ambulance Companies, 1st Minnesota Ambulance Company, 1st and 2nd Iowa Field Hospitals, 1st Minnesota Field Hospital, 1st North Dakota Field Hospital, and Company D, 6th Nebraska Infantry)

=== Interwar period ===
==== Reorganization and training ====
In accordance with the National Defense Act of 1920, the division was allotted to Iowa, Minnesota, South Dakota, and North Dakota, and assigned to the VII Corps in 1921. On 17 January 1921, the aviation unit of the Minnesota National Guard was the first National Guard aviation unit to receive federal recognition. Per War Department naming conventions, it was re-designated the 109th Observation Squadron on 25 January 1923. By 1924, a sufficient number of subordinate units had been organized to meet the federal standards for organization of a division headquarters and staff, and the division headquarters was reorganized and federally recognized on 14 July 1924 at Council Bluffs, Iowa, under the command of Major General Mathew A. Tinley; when Major General George E. Leach of Minnesota took command, the headquarters was relocated on 14 July 1940 to Camp Ripley, near Little Falls, Minnesota.

The designated mobilization training centre for the "Red Bull" Division was Camp Dodge, Iowa, near Des Moines, 1921–1930, and Camp Ripley, 1931–1940. For most years from 1921 to 1940, the division's subordinate units held separate summer camps at locations within their respective states: Camp Dodge for Iowa units; Camp Lake View on Lake Pepin near Lake City, until 1931, and from 1931 on, Camp Ripley for Minnesota units; Camp Gilbert C. Grafton near Devils Lake for North Dakota units; and Camp Rapid near Rapid City for South Dakota units. For at least one year, in 1938, the division's subordinate units also trained over eighty company-grade Reserve officers of the 88th Division at their various training camps in the division's home area. The division staff, composed of personnel from all four states, came together to conduct joint training for several summers before World War II. The staff generally alternated years between Fort Snelling, Minnesota, and Camp Dodge and participated in several corps area and army-level command post exercises.

==== Domestic deployments ====
On 16 May 1934, the International Brotherhood of Teamsters initiated a strike (Minneapolis Teamsters Strike of 1934), which quickly degenerated into open violence in the streets of Minneapolis. Minnesota governor Floyd B. Olson activated 4,000 National Guardsmen to suppress the chaos. Utilizing roving patrols, curfews, and security details, the 34th quickly restored order, enabling a negotiated settlement of the labour dispute.

On 18 June 1939, a tornado hit Anoka, Minnesota, and Governor Harold Stassen called on the Guard again. Three hundred Guardsmen patrolled the streets and imposed quasi-martial law while the community was stabilized.

==== Pre-war exercises ====
The first opportunity for the entire division to operate together came in August 1937 during that portion of the Fourth Army maneuvers held at Camp Ripley. The next opportunity came in August 1940 when the division again assembled at Camp Ripley for the Seventh Corps Area concentration of the Fourth Army maneuvers. In that maneuver, the "Red Bull" Division operated as part of the "Red Army" against the 35th Division and the "Blue Army."

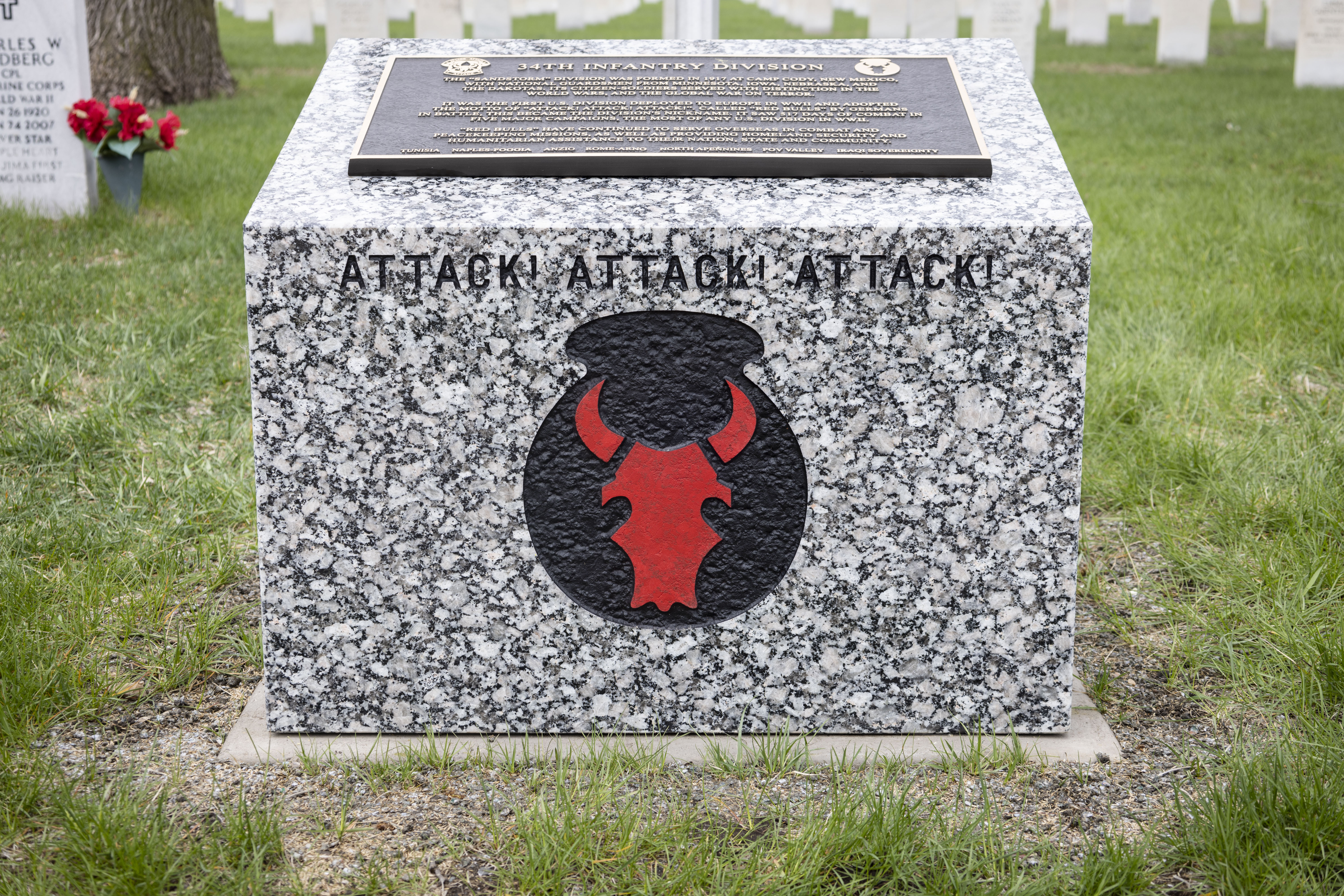
A monument dedicated to the 34th Infantry Division at Fort Snelling National Cemetery near Minneapolis, Minnesota

In 1929, the 185th Field Artillery Regiment was reassigned from the VII Corps Artillery to the 34th Division when the Army returned 155 mm howitzer regiments to infantry divisions. The 109th Ammunition Train was never authorized for organization, and was disbanded in an inactive status on 1 July 1940.

The 109th Medical Regiment was originally allotted to Minnesota and North Dakota. In 1927, the regiment was relieved from assignment to the 34th Division, assigned to the VII Corps, and the North Dakota elements were concurrently withdrawn and allotted to Minnesota. No units of the regiment were ever organized before it was withdrawn from allotment to the National Guard in September 1927 and demobilized. Concurrently, the 136th Medical Regiment, allotted to Iowa and South Dakota, was reassigned from the VII Corps to the 34th Division with all South Dakota elements withdrawn and allotted to Iowa. The regiment, less two companies active since 1922 and 1926, respectively, began organization in April 1939.

=== World War II ===
The expanding war in Europe threatened to draw a reluctant United States into the conflict. As the potential of U.S. involvement in World War II became more evident, initial steps were taken to prepare troops for what lay ahead through "precautionary training." The division was deemed one of the most service-ready units, and Ellard A. Walsh was promoted to major general in June 1940, and then succeeded to division commander in August. The Selective Training and Service Act of 1940 was signed into law 16 September, and the first conscription in U.S. history during peacetime commenced.

==== WWII division organization ====
===== Square division =====
On 10 February 1941, the 34th Division was inducted into federal service at home stations and then assembled at Camp Claiborne in Louisiana. At the time the division still retained its World War I square organization and consisted of the following units.

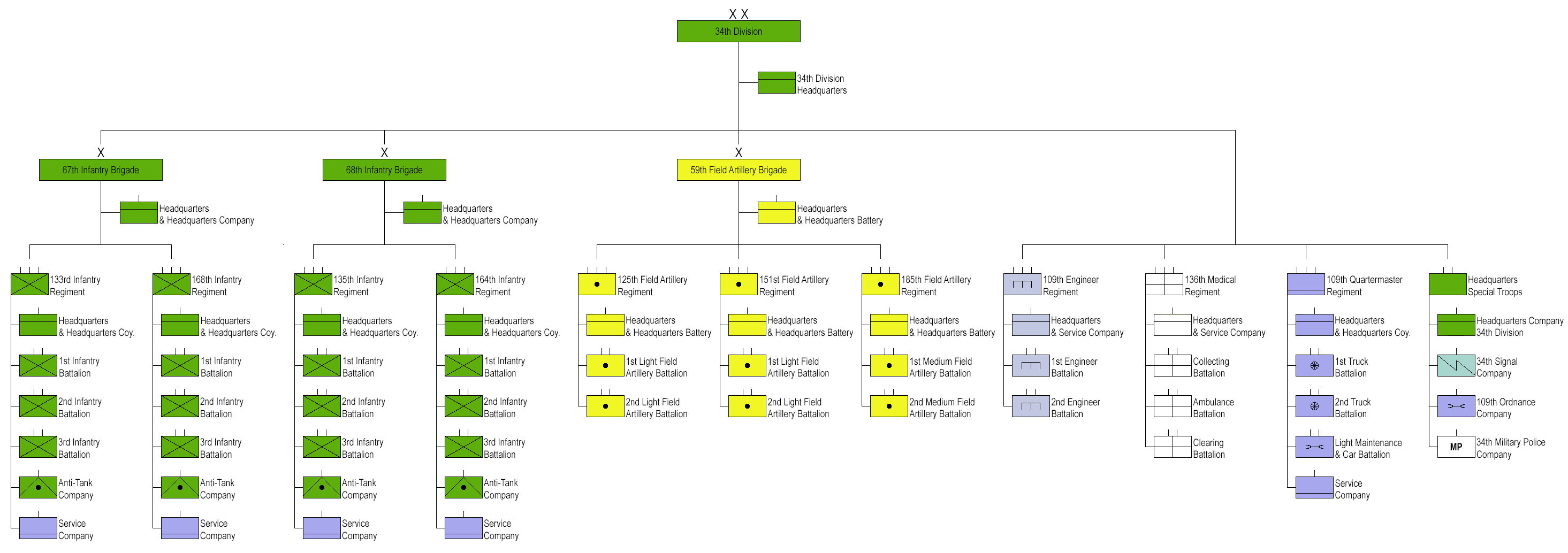
34th Division square organization (click to enlarge)

- 34th Division, in Council Bluffs (IA)
  - 34th Division Headquarters
  - 67th Infantry Brigade, in Des Moines (IA)
    - Headquarters and Headquarters Company, in Des Moines (IA)
    - 133rd Infantry Regiment, in Sioux City (IA)
      - Headquarters and Headquarters Company
      - 3× Infantry battalions
        - each battalion consists of: 1× Headquarters and Headquarters Detachment, 3× Rifle companies, 1× Weapons Company
      - Anti-Tank Company (M3 37mm Anti-Tank guns)
      - Service Company
    - 168th Infantry Regiment, in Council Bluffs (IA)
      - same organization as 133rd Infantry Regiment
  - 68th Infantry Brigade, in Valley City (ND)
    - Headquarters and Headquarters Company, in Northfield (MN)
    - 135th Infantry Regiment, in Minneapolis (MN)
      - same organization as 133rd Infantry Regiment
    - 164th Infantry Regiment, in Fargo (ND)
      - same organization as 133rd Infantry Regiment
  - 59th Field Artillery Brigade, in Minneapolis (MN)
    - Headquarters and Headquarters Battery, in Minneapolis (MN)
    - 125th Field Artillery Regiment, in Duluth (MN)
      - Headquarters and Headquarters Battery
      - 2× Light Field Artillery battalions
        - Headquarters and Headquarters Battery
        - 3× Howitzer batteries (M1897 75mm field guns), replaced by M2 105mm towed howitzers in 1941)
        - Service Battery
    - 151st Field Artillery Regiment, in Minneapolis (MN)
      - same organization as 125th Field Artillery Regiment
    - 185th Field Artillery Regiment, in Davenport (IA)
      - Headquarters and Headquarters Battery
      - 2× Medium Field Artillery battalions
        - Headquarters and Headquarters Battery
        - 3× Howitzer batteries (M1918 155mm towed howitzers, replaced by M1 155mm towed howitzers in 1941)
        - Anti-Tank Battery (M1897 75mm anti-tank guns)
        - Service Battery
  - 109th Engineer Regiment, in Rapid City (SD)
    - Headquarters and Headquarters and Service Company
    - 2× Engineer battalions
      - each battalion consists of: 1× Headquarters, 3× Engineer companies
  - 136th Medical Regiment, in Ames (IA)
    - Headquarters and Headquarters and Service Company
    - Collecting Battalion
      - battalion consists of: 1× Headquarters, 3× Collecting companies
    - Ambulance Battalion
      - battalion consists of: 1× Headquarters, 3× Ambulance companies
    - Clearing Battalion
      - battalion consists of: 1× Headquarters, 3× Clearing companies
  - 109th Quartermaster Regiment, in Osceola (IA)
    - Headquarters and Headquarters Company
    - 2× Truck battalions
      - each battalion consists of: 1× Headquarters, 2× Truck companies
    - Light Maintenance and Car Battalion
      - battalion consists of: 1× Headquarters, 1× Light Maintenance Company, 1× Car Company
    - Service Company
  - Headquarters, Special Troops, in Council Bluffs (IA)
    - Headquarters Company, 34th Division, in Council Bluffs (IA)
    - 34th Signal Company, in Watertown (SD)
    - 109th Ordnance Company, in Minnesota
    - 34th Military Police Company, in Aitkin (MN)

On 7 April 1941, the soldiers started rigorous training. The climate during the summer was especially harsh. The division then participated in what became known as the Louisiana Maneuvers, and became a well-trained unit. During the early phase of the maneuvers, General Walsh became too ill to continue in command because of chronic stomach ulcers. After an interim tenure by Iowan Brigadier General Gordon C. Hollar of the 67th Infantry Brigade, the senior brigadier general of the division, Walsh was replaced by Regular Army Major General Russell P. Hartle on 5 August 1941.

===== Triangular division =====
On 1 February 1942, as a part of an Army-wide reorganization of National Guard divisions, the 34th Division was reorganized as a triangular division. The division's two brigade headquarters were disbanded in favor of a structure containing three separate regimental commands reporting directly to the division headquarters, as well as four field artillery battalions under a division artillery headquarters, with the engineer, medical, and quartermaster regiments also reduced to battalions. The 164th Infantry Regiment had already been relieved from assignment to the division on 8 December 1941 and moved to California, from where it sailed in March 1942 to Australia. In May 1942 the regiment was assigned to the newly formed Americal Division. With the reorganization the division was renamed 34th Infantry Division. Afterwards the 34th Infantry Division was composed of the following units:

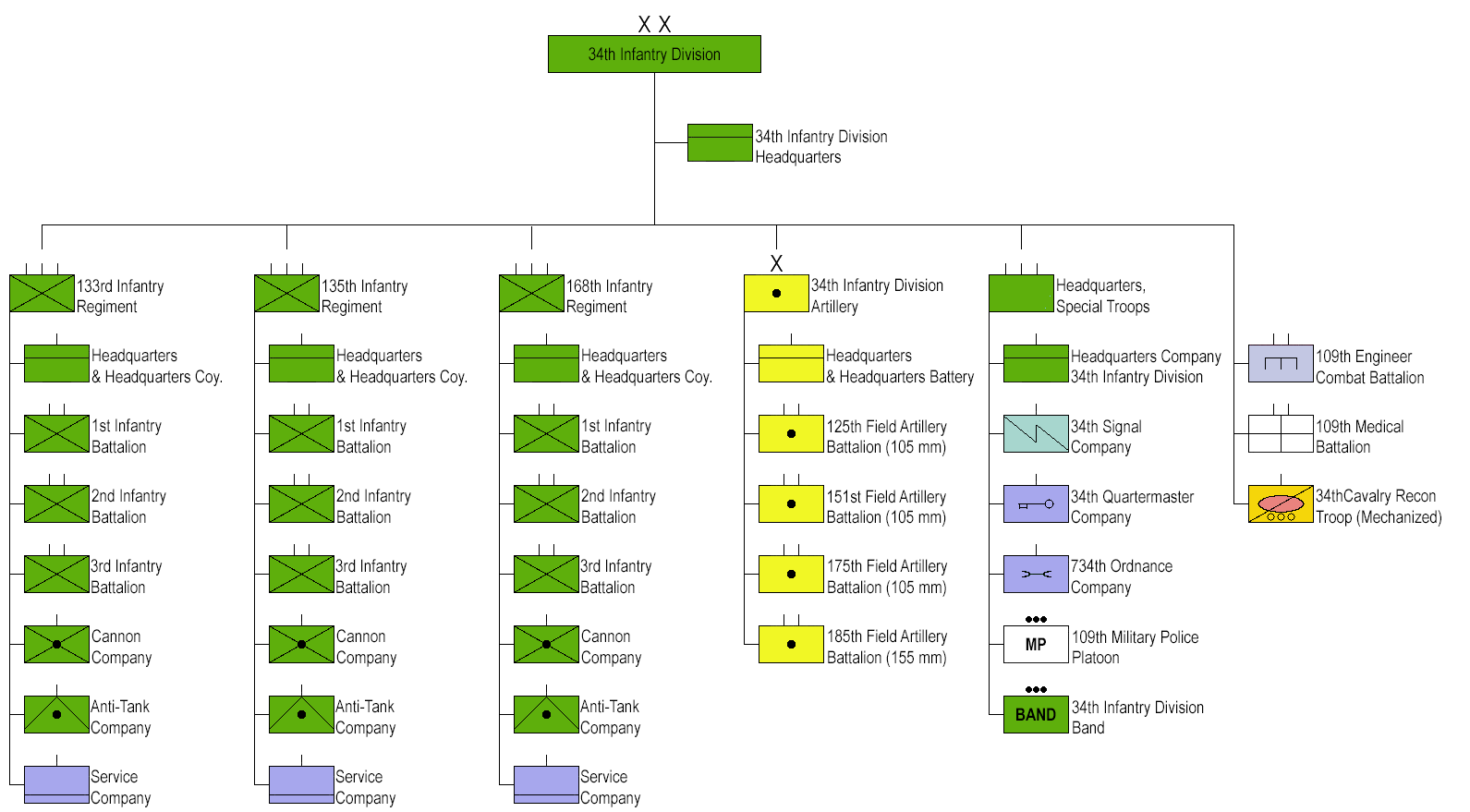
34th Infantry Division triangular organization (click to enlarge)

- 34th Infantry Division
  - 34th Infantry Division Headquarters
  - 34th Cavalry Reconnaissance Troop (Mechanized) (M3 scout cars and then M8 Greyhound armored cars)
  - 133rd Infantry Regiment
    - Headquarters and Headquarters Company
    - 3× Infantry battalions (including the 100th Infantry Battalion, which replaced the regiment's 2nd Battalion in 1943)
      - each battalion consists of: 1× Headquarters and Headquarters Company, 3× Rifle companies, 1× Heavy Weapons Company
    - Cannon Company (T12 Gun Motor Carriages and T19 Howitzer Motor Carriages, later replaced by either M3 105mm towed howitzers or M7 Priest self propelled howitzers)
    - Anti-Tank Company (M3 37mm anti-tank guns, which were replaced by 1944 with M1 57mm anti-tank guns)
    - Service Company
  - 135th Infantry Regiment
    - same organization as 133rd Infantry Regiment
  - 168th Infantry Regiment
    - same organization as 133rd Infantry Regiment
  - 34th Infantry Division Artillery
    - Headquarters and Headquarters Battery
    - 125th Field Artillery Battalion
      - Headquarters and Headquarters Battery
      - 3× Batteries (M2 105mm towed howitzers)
      - Service Battery
    - 151st Field Artillery Battalion
      - same organization as 125th Field Artillery Battalion
    - 175th Field Artillery Battalion
      - same organization as 125th Field Artillery Battalion
    - 185th Field Artillery Battalion
      - Headquarters and Headquarters Battery
      - 3× Batteries (M1 155mm towed howitzers)
      - Service Battery
  - Headquarters Special Troops
    - Headquarters Company, 34th Infantry Division
    - 34th Signal Company
    - 34th Quartermaster Company
    - 734th Ordnance Light Maintenance Company
    - 109th Military Police Platoon
    - 34th Infantry Division Band (attached)
  - 34th Quartermaster Battalion (Between September and November 1942 Quartermaster battalions were disbanded and their platoons used to form a Quartermaster Company and an Ordnance Company, which were both assigned to Headquarters Special Troops)
    - Headquarters and Headquarters Company (includes a service platoon and a maintenance platoon)
    - Truck Company
  - 109th Engineer Combat Battalion
    - Headquarters and Headquarters and Service Company
    - 3× Engineer combat companies
  - 109th Medical Battalion
    - Headquarters and Headquarters Detachment
    - 3× Collecting companies
    - Clearing Company

==== Combat chronicle ====
On 8 January 1942, the 34th Division was transported by train to Fort Dix, New Jersey to quickly prepare for overseas movement. The first contingent embarked at Brooklyn on 14 January 1942 and sailed from New York the next day. The initial group of 4,508 men stepped ashore at 12:15 hrs on 26 January 1942 at Dufferin Quay, Belfast, Northern Ireland. They were met by a delegation including the Governor (Duke of Abercorn), the Prime Minister of Northern Ireland (J. M. Andrews), the Commander of British Troops Northern Ireland (Lieutenant General Sir Harold Franklyn), and the Secretary of State for Air (Sir Archibald Sinclair). Private First Class Milburn H. Henke, Company B, 133rd Infantry Regiment, of Hutchinson, Minnesota, was honorarily selected as the "first" American soldier to set foot in the United Kingdom during the Second World War. The remainder of the division embarked for Northern Ireland in late April 1942, arriving in early May.

While in Northern Ireland, Hartle was tasked with organizing an American version of the British Commandos, a group of small "hit and run" forces, and promoted his aide-de-camp, Captain William Orlando Darby to lead the new unit. Darby assembled volunteers, and of the first 500 U.S. Army Rangers, 281 came from the 34th Infantry Division. On 20 May 1942, Hartle was designated commanding general of V Corps and Major General Charles Ryder, a distinguished veteran of World War I, took command of the 34th Division. In September 1942, the 2nd Battalion, 133rd Infantry, was attached to Allied Force Headquarters for guard and police duties, later traveling to North Africa with the headquarters. The division boarded ships to travel to North Africa for Operation Torch, the Allied invasion of North Africa, in November 1942.

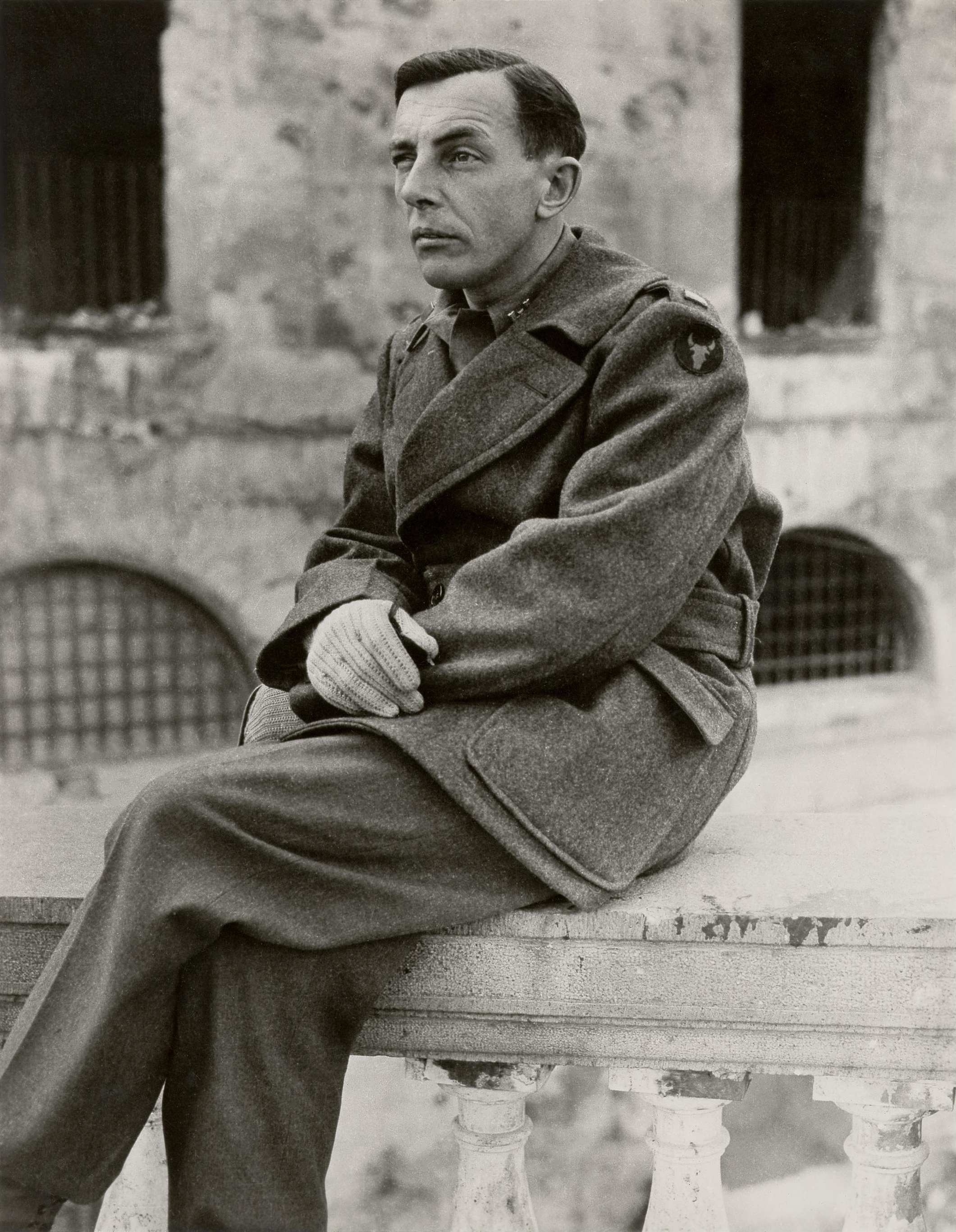
Acting intelligence officer Rudolph von Ripper c. 1942 wearing red bull shoulder badge

The 34th, under command of Major General Ryder, saw its first combat in French Algeria on 8 November 1942. As a member of the Eastern Task Force, which included two brigades of the British 78th Infantry Division, and two British Commando units, they landed at Algiers and seized the port and outlying airfields. Elements of the 34th Division took part in numerous subsequent engagements in Tunisia during the Allied build-up, notably at Sened Station, Sidi Bou Zid and Faid Pass, Sbeitla, and Fondouk Gap. In April 1943 during Operation Vulcan the division assaulted Hill 609, capturing it on 1 May 1943, and then drove through Chouigui Pass to Tebourba and Ferryville. The Battle of Tunisia was won, and the Axis forces surrendered.

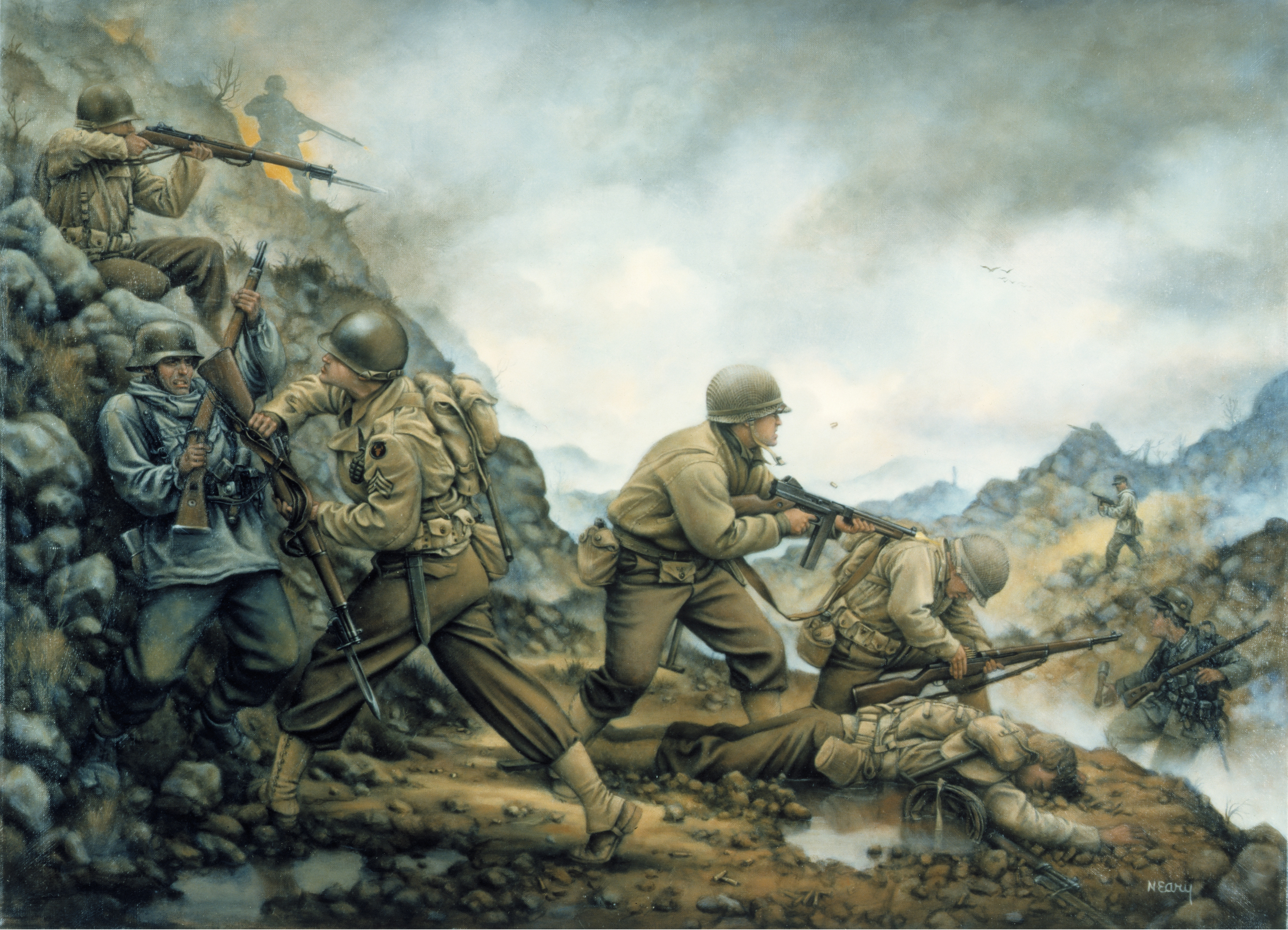
The Red Bull in the Winter Line of Pantano, Italy – 29 November to 3 December 1943.

The division skipped the Allied invasion of Sicily (Operation Husky) due to heavy casualties suffered in North Africa especially at Faid Pass where the 168th Infantry Regiment lost half of its strength with its men killed or captured and was in need of replacements and refitting, and instead trained intensively for the invasion of the Italian mainland, with the main landings being at Salerno (Operation Avalanche) on 9 September 1943, D-Day, to be undertaken by elements of the U.S. Fifth Army, commanded by Lieutenant General Mark Clark. The 151st Field Artillery Battalion went in on D-Day, 9 September, landing at Salerno, while the rest of the division followed on 25 September.

The segregated Japanese-American 100th Infantry Battalion was attached to the 133rd Infantry at the end of the North African campaign to replace the 2nd Battalion, later traveling with them to Italy. Composed of Japanese Americans, many of whom had been stripped of their weapons in Hawaii after the attack on Pearl Harbor, the 100th Battalion earned the nickname "Purple Heart Battalion" for its exceptionally high casualty rate. During five months of combat from Salerno through Monte Cassino, the battalion was reduced from approximately 1,300 men to 521 fit for duty. Major General Ryder authorized the 100th Battalion to wear the Red Bull shoulder patch in recognition of their service.

Engaging the enemy at the Calore River, 28 September, the 34th, as part of the VI Corps under Major General John Lucas, advanced north to take Benevento, crossed the winding Volturno three times in October and November, assaulted Monte Pantano, and took one of its four peaks before being relieved on 8 December.

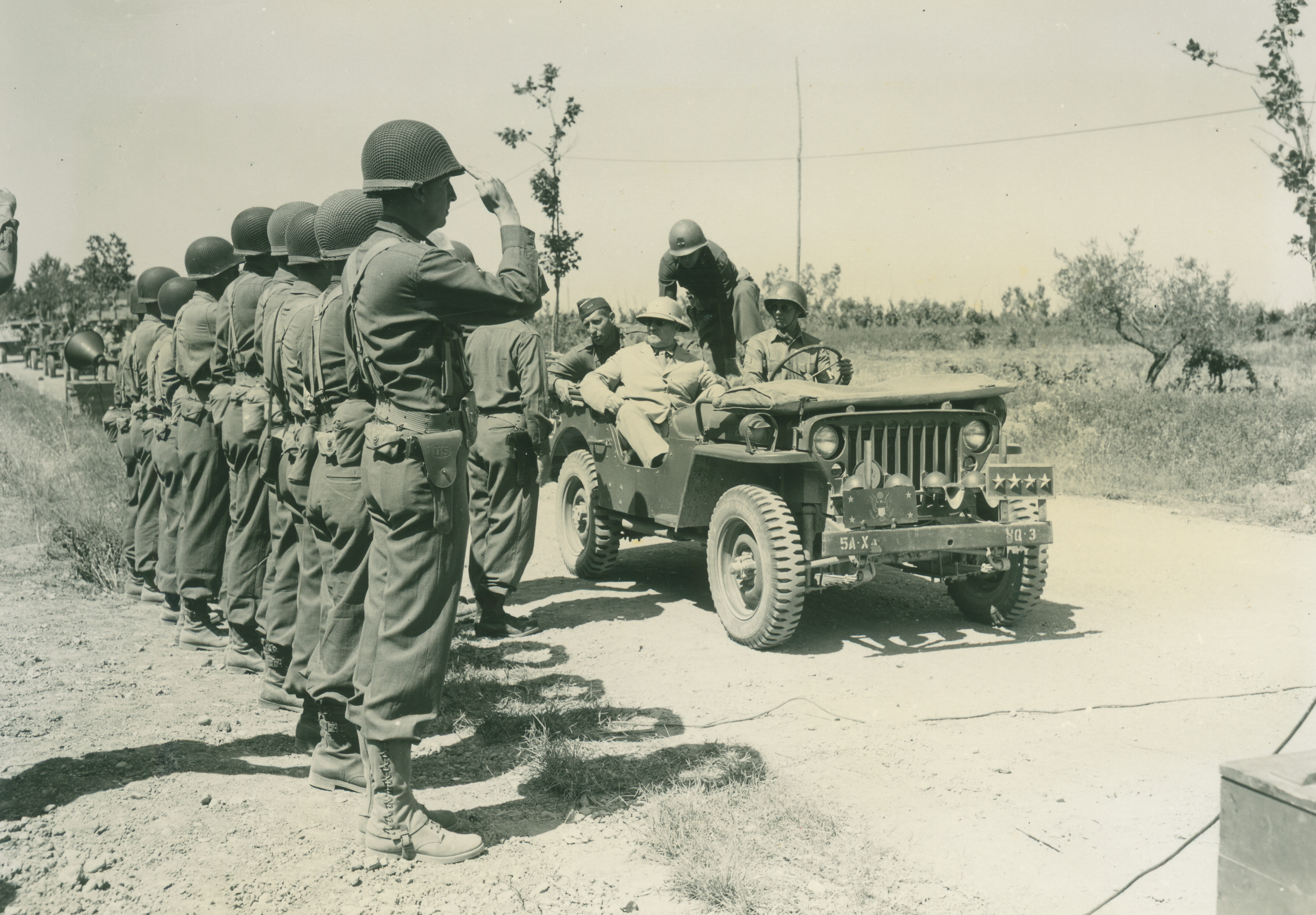
Secretary of War Stimson, Lt. Gen. Clark and Maj. Gen. Ryder reviewing 34th Division soldiers, 1944

In January 1944, the division was back on the front line battering the Bernhardt Line defenses. Persevering through bitter fighting along the Mignano Gap, the 34th used goat herds to clear the minefields. The 34th took Monte Trocchio without resistance as the German defenders withdrew to the main prepared defenses of the Gustav Line. On 24 January 1944, during the First Battle of Monte Cassino they pushed across the Gari River into the hills behind and attacked Monastery Hill which dominated the town of Monte Cassino. While they nearly captured the objective, in the end their attacks on the monastery and the town failed. The performance of the 34th Infantry Division in the mountains has been called one of the finest feats of arms carried out by any soldiers during the war. The unit sustained severe losses. In the 133rd Infantry, the attached 100th Battalion, had only 7 officers and 78 men remaining in its rifle companies. In the 135th Infantry, there was an average of only 30 men in each rifle company. In the 168th Infantry, the 1st Battalion had only 154 combat effective men, the 2nd Battalion had 393, and the 3rd Battalion had 246. They were relieved from their positions 11–13 February 1944. Three further Allied offensives involving multiple divisions were required before the monastery position finally fell on 18 May 1944.

After rest and rehabilitation, during which the 133rd Infantry's 2nd Battalion rejoined its parent regiment, the 34th Division landed at the Anzio beachhead 25 March 1944. The division maintained defensive positions until the offensive of 23 May, when it broke out of the beachhead, took Cisterna, and raced to Civitavecchia and the Italian capital of Rome. After a short rest, the division, now commanded by Major General Charles Bolte, drove across the Cecina River to liberate Livorno, 19 July 1944, and continued on to take Monte Belmonte in October during the fighting on the Gothic Line. Digging in south of Bologna for the winter, the 34th manned the line opposite the German 65th Infantry Division. The Red Bull Division jumped off as part of the Spring 1945 offensive in Italy, 15 April 1945, and captured Bologna on 21 April after hard fighting against the 65th. Pursuit of the routed enemy to the French border was halted on 2 May upon the German surrender in Italy and the end of World War II in Europe.

==== Combat statistics ====
The division participated in six major Army campaigns in North Africa and Italy. The division is credited with amassing 517 days of front-line combat, second only to the 654 days of fighting by the 32nd Infantry Division.

Unit history

- Activated: 10 February 1941 (National Guard Division from North Dakota, South Dakota, Iowa, Minnesota)
- Overseas: May 1942
- Days of combat: 517
- Distinguished Unit Citations: 3
- Casualties:
  - Killed in action: 2,866
  - Wounded in action: 11,545
  - Missing in action: 622
  - Prisoner of war: 1,368
  - Total battle casualties: 16,401
- Returned to U.S.: 3 November 1945
- Inactivated: 3 November 1945

==== Honors and decorations ====
- Medals of Honor: 9 (Note: The count of Medal of Honor recipients attributed to the 34th Infantry Division varies by source. Nine recipients served in organic division units. Some tallies include recipients from attached units such as the 100th Infantry Battalion, raising the figure to eleven.)
- Distinguished Service Crosses: 98
- Distinguished Service Medals: 1
- Silver Stars: 1,153
- Bronze Stars: 2,545
- Legions of Merit: 116
- Soldier's Medals: 54
- Purple Hearts: 15,000

Foreign awards

- Italian Medal of Valor: A highly prestigious decoration awarded to select Americans. For instance, Tech. Sgt. Don Singlestad (135th Infantry Regiment) was one of only three Americans to receive this award for his actions during the grueling battle of Hill 810 in September 1944.
- French Croix de Guerre with Palm. On 21 June 1945, French General Charles de Gaulle awarded the 34th Infantry Division the Croix de Guerre with Palm, the highest grade of the decoration. The citation praised the division as a "division d'elite" for its "loyal and efficient cooperation with French divisions, begun in Tunisia" and "gloriously continued throughout the Italian campaign, in particular during the operations of Belvedere."

=== Cold War to 1991 ===
The 34th was inactivated on 3 November 1945, and was reformed within the Iowa and Nebraska National Guards in 1946–1947. The 47th Infantry Division was activated in 1946 as a National Guard division for Minnesota and North Dakota in part of the 34th Infantry Division's former area.

==== Order of battle, 1948 ====
- Headquarters, 34th Infantry Division (Iowa, Nebraska)
- 133rd Infantry Regiment (Iowa)
- 134th Infantry Regiment (Nebraska)
- 168th Infantry Regiment (Iowa)
- Headquarters and Headquarters Battery, 34th Infantry Division Artillery (Iowa)
  - 554th Field Artillery Battalion (105 mm) (Iowa)
  - 556th Field Artillery Battalion (105 mm) (Iowa)
  - 568th Field Artillery Battalion (105 mm) (Nebraska)
  - 185th Field Artillery Battalion (155 mm) (Iowa)
- Headquarters, Special Troops, 34th Infantry Division (Iowa)
  - Headquarters Company, 34th Infantry Division (Iowa)
  - 734th Ordnance Maintenance Company (Nebraska)
  - 34th Quartermaster Company (Nebraska)
  - 34th Signal Company (Iowa)
  - 34th Military Police Company (Iowa)
  - 34th Infantry Division Band (Iowa)
- 128th Engineer Combat Battalion (Nebraska)
- 109th Medical Battalion (Iowa)
- 34th Mechanized Cavalry Reconnaissance Troop (Iowa)

In 1960, under the Pentomic organization, the 34th Infantry Division's units comprised the 1st and 2nd Battle Groups, 133rd Infantry, the 1st and 2nd Battle Groups, 134th Infantry, the 1st Battle Group, 168th Infantry, the 1st and 2nd Battalions, 168th Field Artillery, the 1st-4th Battalions, 185th Field Artillery, the 1st Battalion, 133rd Armor, the 2nd Squadron, 133rd Armor (Cavalry), the 734th Ordnance Battalion, the 128th Engineer Battalion, the 109th Medical Battalion, the 234th Signal Battalion, the 234th Transportation Battalion, the 34th Quartermaster Company, the 34th Aviation Company, the 34th Administration Company, and the 34th Aircraft Maintenance Detachment.

The 34th Division was disbanded again in 1963. It became a Command Headquarters, Divisional, retaining a National Guard general billet, to supervise training of combat and support units in the former division area. The HQ Company of the division became the HQ Company of the 34th CHQ (D) after consolidation with the 34th Administration Company. (Long afterwards, the HQ Company became HHC 734th Regional Support Group.) On 1 January 1968, the 34th Command Headquarters (Divisional) was reorganized as the 34th Infantry Brigade, part of the 47th Infantry Division.

=== Second activation ===
The 34th Infantry Division was reactivated on 10 February 1991 (the fiftieth anniversary of its federal activation for World War II) as a National Guard division for Minnesota and Iowa by, in effect, redesignating the 47th Infantry Division as the 34th Infantry Division, a process known as "reflagging." However, for historical purposes, the Department of the Army's Center of Military History does not recognize any lineal continuity between the headquarters of the 47th Infantry Division and the second activation of the headquarters of the 34th Infantry Division. Instead, the lineage of the 34th Infantry Division's headquarters is perpetuated by the headquarters of the 34th Infantry Brigade. At that point, the division transitioned into a medium division, with a required strength of 18,062 soldiers.

== Twenty-first century ==
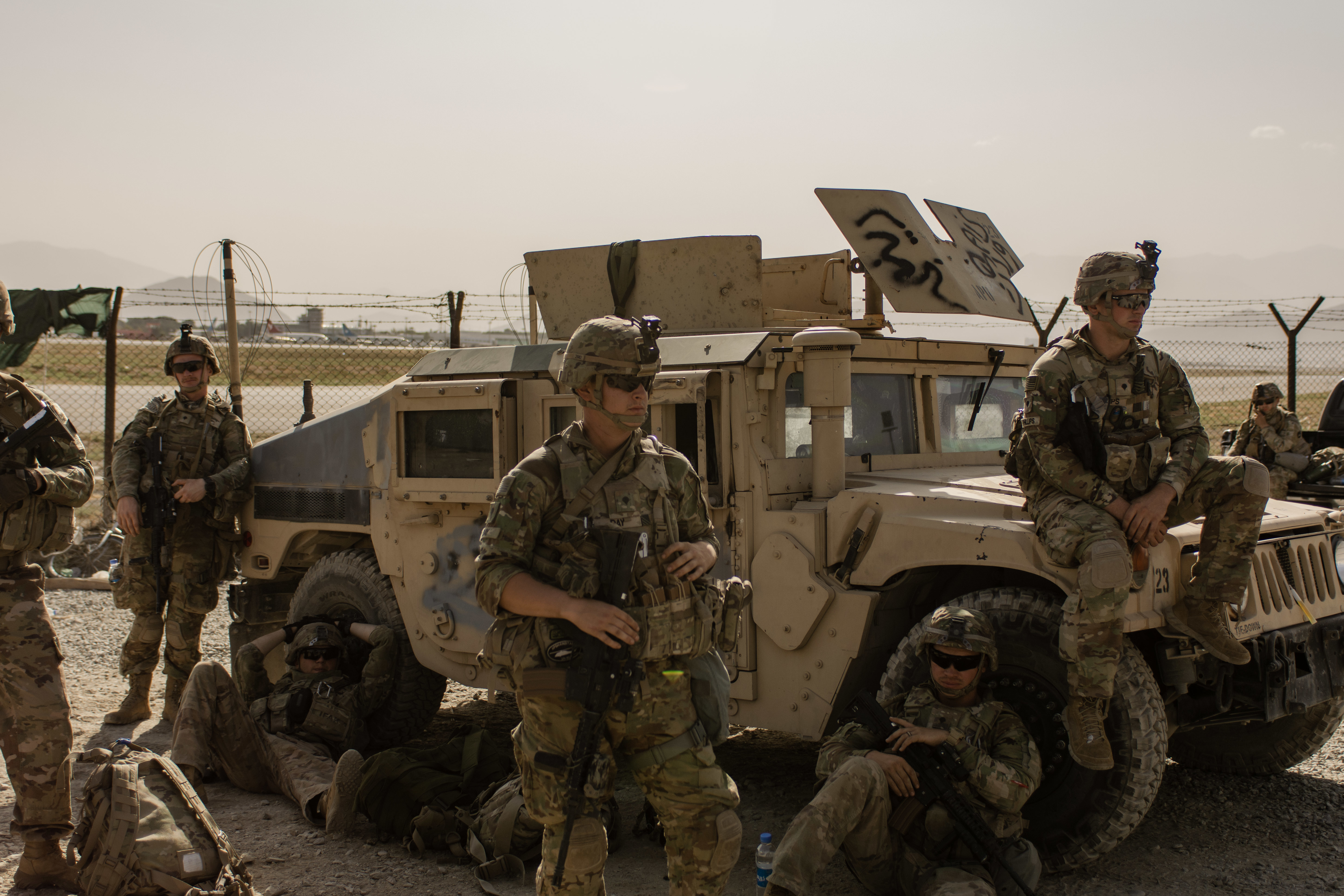
34th Infantry Division soldiers, part of Task Force Spartan, provide security at Hamid Karzai International Airport during the 2021 Kabul airlifts.

Shortly after its rebirth in 1991, the division began a process of reorganization and change that has continued to the present. One of the most significant developments was transformation from its old brigade structure into brigade combat teams and the broadening of its base into eight different states. In Minnesota, the 34th ID includes the 1st Armored Brigade Combat Team, 34th Combat Aviation Brigade, and the 347th Regional Support Group (previously the 47th then 34th Division Support Command). The 34th Infantry Division is capable of deploying its Main Command Post, Tactical Command Post, and Division Headquarters and Headquarters Battalion to provide command and control for Army brigades.

Outside Minnesota, the 34th Infantry Division provides training and operational guidance to the 1–112th Security & Support Battalion, ND National Guard; 1–183rd Aviation Battalion, Idaho National Guard; 1–189th Aviation Battalion, Mont. National Guard; 115th Fires Brigade, Wyo. National Guard; 116th Heavy Brigade Combat Team, Idaho National Guard; 141st Maneuver Enhancement Brigade, ND National Guard; 157th Maneuver Enhancement Brigade, Wis. National Guard; 196th Maneuver Enhancement Brigade, SD National Guard; 2nd Brigade Combat Team, Iowa National Guard; and the 32nd Infantry Brigade Combat Team, Wis. National Guard. Combined, the division represents 23,000 Citizen-Soldiers in units stationed across eight different states.

Since October 2001, division personnel served in Operation Joint Forge in Bosnia and Herzegovina and Operation Joint Guardian in Kosovo. Other deployments during the same time period have included Operation Vigilant Hammer in Europe, the Mediterranean Theater of Operations, and Egypt, and Joint Task Force Bravo – Honduras.

The 34th Infantry Division has deployed approximately 11,000 soldiers on operations since October 2001. At home this has included troops deployed for Operation Noble Eagle; abroad, units and individual soldiers have deployed to Afghanistan and Iraq.

=== Afghanistan ===
In May 2004, the 1st Battalion, 168th Infantry Regiment (augmented by Company D, 2nd Battalion, 135th Infantry Regiment), 2nd Brigade, 34th Infantry Division, and with nearly 100 key positions filled by members of the 1st Battalion (Ironman), 133rd Infantry Regiment, 2nd Brigade, 34th Infantry Division, commenced combat operations at 13 Provincial Reconstruction Team sites throughout Afghanistan as part of Operation Enduring Freedom. The deployment returned the 34th Infantry Division to combat after 59 years and made the unit the first in the division to wear the Red Bull patch as a right-shoulder combat patch since World War II. The 2011 book Words in the Dust by former 34th ID soldier Trent Reedy is a novel based on the experiences of the 34th ID soldiers assigned to the Farah, Afghanistan PRT.

In August 2010, nearly 3,000 Iowa National Guard soldiers, with 28 hometown send-offs, left for a year-long deployment to Afghanistan, making it the largest deployment of the Iowa National Guard since World War II. Augmented by the 1–134th Cavalry Reconnaissance and Surveillance Squadron of the Nebraska National Guard, the brigade conducted pre-mobilization training in Mississippi and California. The troops partnered with Afghan security forces to provide security and assist in training.

=== Iraq ===
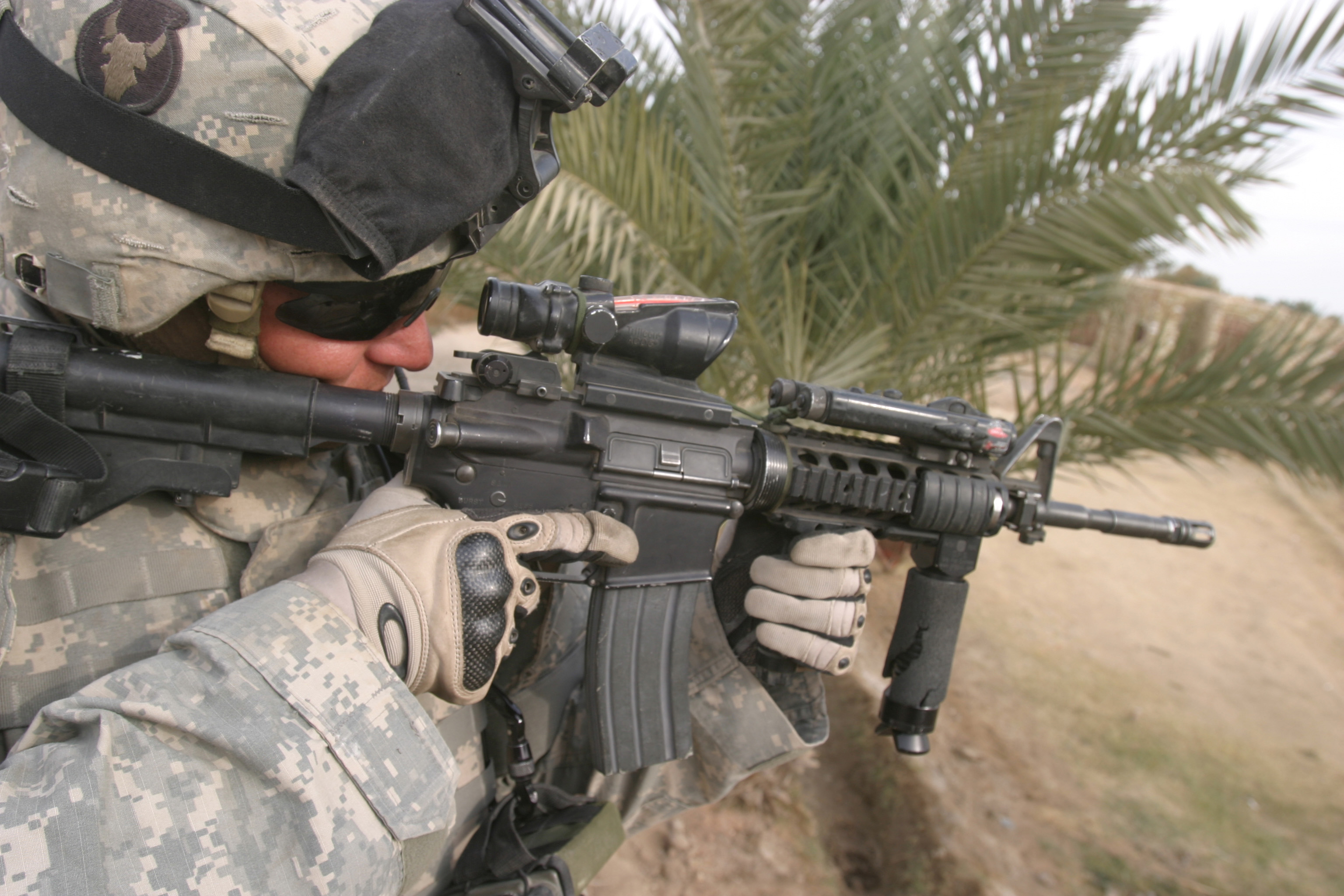
A Red Bull soldier in Anbar Province, Iraq in 2006.

In November 2003, the 34th Infantry Division's D Battery, 216th Air Defense Artillery, from Monticello, Minnesota, was activated for deployment in support of Operation Iraqi Freedom. From November 2003 through March 2004, the battery trained under the 81st Enhanced Separate Brigade (Armored) at Fort Lewis, Yakima Training Center, and Fort Irwin/National Training Center. While training at the National Training Center, D 216 ADA was reassigned to the 1st Cavalry Division, 2nd Brigade Combat Team, 4th Battalion, 5th Air Defense Artillery. In March 2004, the unit moved to Camp New York in Kuwait, then convoyed northward to Baghdad in early April 2004. From April 2004 through March 2005, the battery performed missions to quell a growing insurgency and secure areas of Baghdad ahead of Iraq's first elections. These included securing neighbourhoods adjacent to Route Irish, maintaining a quick reaction force for Route Irish, conducting combat operations across a 100 km^{2} area in the vicinity of Al Radwaniyah Presidential Complex, and providing gate and perimeter security across several locations on the perimeter of Victory Base Complex. In recognition of the unit's service, it was awarded the Valorous Unit Award.

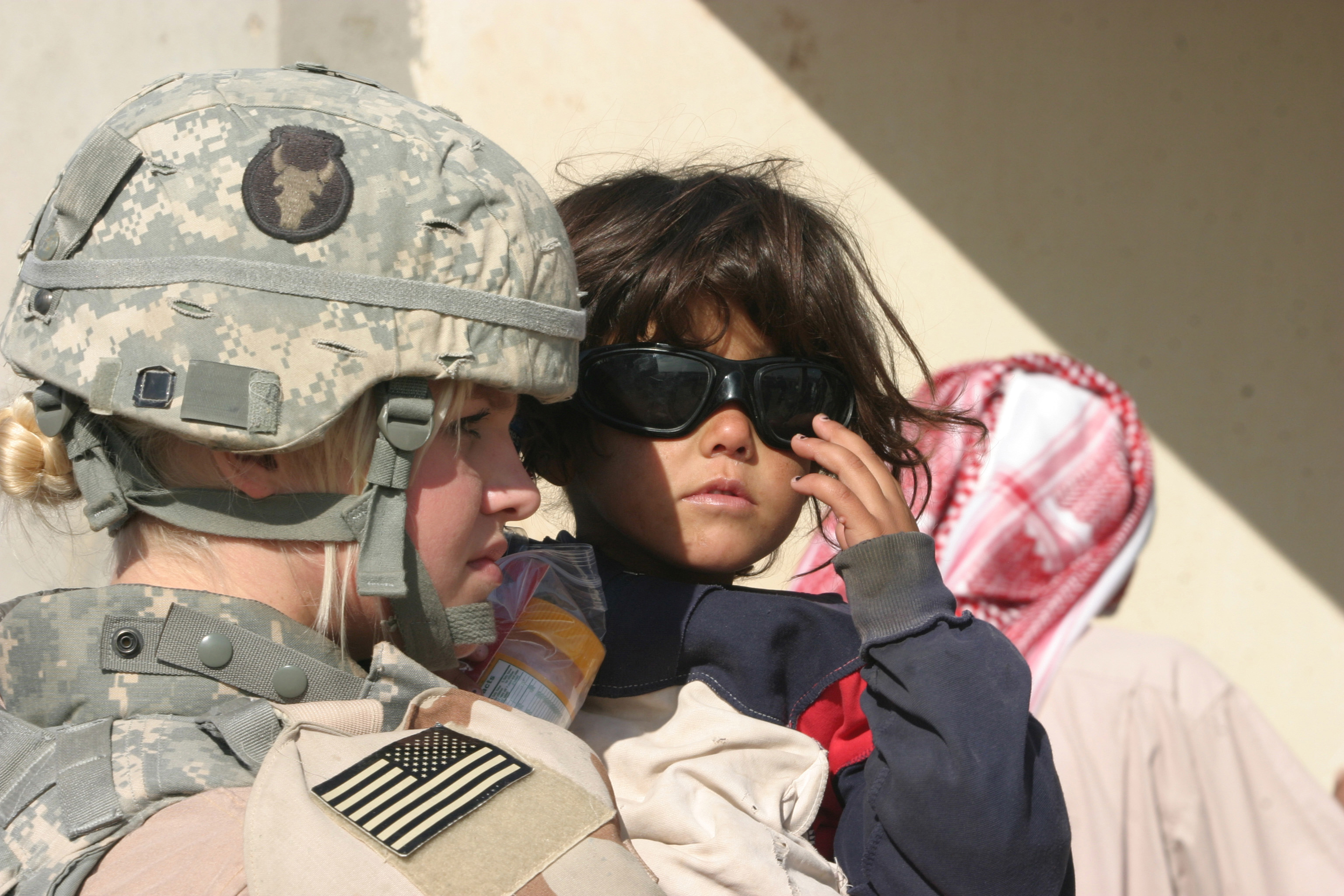
A Red Bull soldier in Iraq in 2006.

In January 2005, Company A, 1st Battalion, 194th Armor Regiment (1/194 AR) arrived at Camp Ashraf (about 80 km north of Baghdad) to conduct security and convoy operations in the surrounding area and conducted joint operations with the Iraqi Army ahead of the October 2005 Iraqi constitution ratification vote. The 151-man unit was formed from nearly all of the soldiers in the 1/194th and Company A was chosen to honour the unit's lineage of the soldiers who fought to defend the Philippines against the Japanese and the Bataan Death March that followed. The unit was awarded the Meritorious Unit Commendation for its exceptional service.

In March 2006, 1st Brigade, 34th Infantry Division commenced combat operations in central and southern Iraq as part of Operation Iraqi Freedom, marking the largest single unit deployment for the 34th since World War II. Returning in July 2007, 1st Brigade served one of the longest consecutive combat operations by a United States National Guard unit (activated for 22 months total with 16 in Iraq, after two deployment extensions). In an effort to recreate the Living Red Bull Patch from Camp Cody, NM, in 1918, the 1st Brigade made its own Living Patch on the parade field at Camp Shelby, MS prior to its deployment to Iraq for OIF 06–08. Twenty soldiers of the Brigade were killed in action during this deployment.

More than 700 34th Combat Aviation Brigade soldiers deployed to Iraq and Afghanistan in 2008–2009.

In 2009–2010, the 34th Red Bull Infantry Division deployed more than 1,200 soldiers to Basra, Iraq where they provided command and control for 16,000 U.S. military members and oversaw operations in nine of Iraq's 18 provinces. On 16 July 2009, three members of the division were killed in Basra.

The Saint Cloud-based B Company, 2nd General Support Aviation Battalion, 211th Aviation Regiment, departed in November 2010 for a deployment in support of Operation New Dawn, flying CH-47 Chinook cargo helicopters to provide aerial movement of troops, equipment, and supplies.

In June 2011, 1st Brigade deployed to Kuwait, supplying troops for Operation New Dawn. The brigade was augmented with 1–180th Cavalry and 1–160th Field Artillery from the Oklahoma National Guard as well as the 112th Military Police Battalion from the Mississippi National Guard.

Personnel from the 34th Infantry Division participated in the exercise Talisman Saber in 2013 to collectively train within the U.S. Pacific Command Theater of Operations. Division Headquarters personnel focused on offensive and defensive operations while fostering relationships with I Corps, U.S. Army Pacific, and the Australian Defence Forces.

=== United States ===
In August 2018, the 34th Combat Aviation Brigade provided CH-47 and UH-60 helicopters and personnel to local government agencies to fight and contain three wildfires in northwest Minnesota.

In 2013, the 34th Infantry Division participated in a Warfighter Exercise with the 40th Infantry Division at Fort Leavenworth. During this exercise, the brigade staff integrated with different levels of command and adjacent units.

=== Kuwait ===
The 34th Combat Aviation Brigade welcomed home the St. Cloud-based Company C, 2nd General Support Aviation Battalion, 211th Aviation Regiment in 2013 from a deployment in support of Operation Enduring Freedom where they conducted more than 650 medical evacuation missions and flew 1,700 accident-free flight hours. The company also received six new CH-47F Chinook helicopters and trained more than 30 personnel in their operation.

== Division organization in 2026 ==
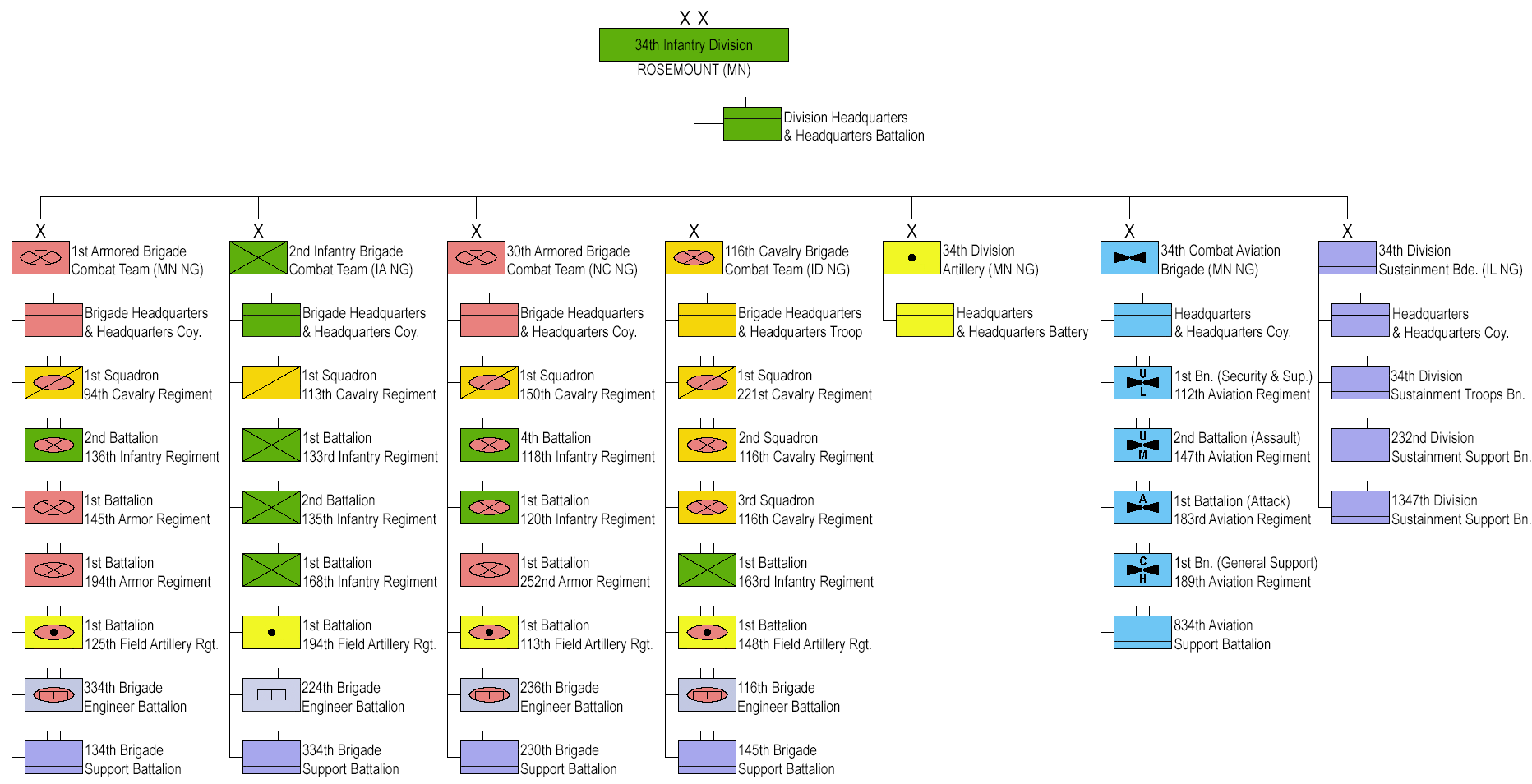
34th Infantry Division organization October 2026 (click to enlarge)

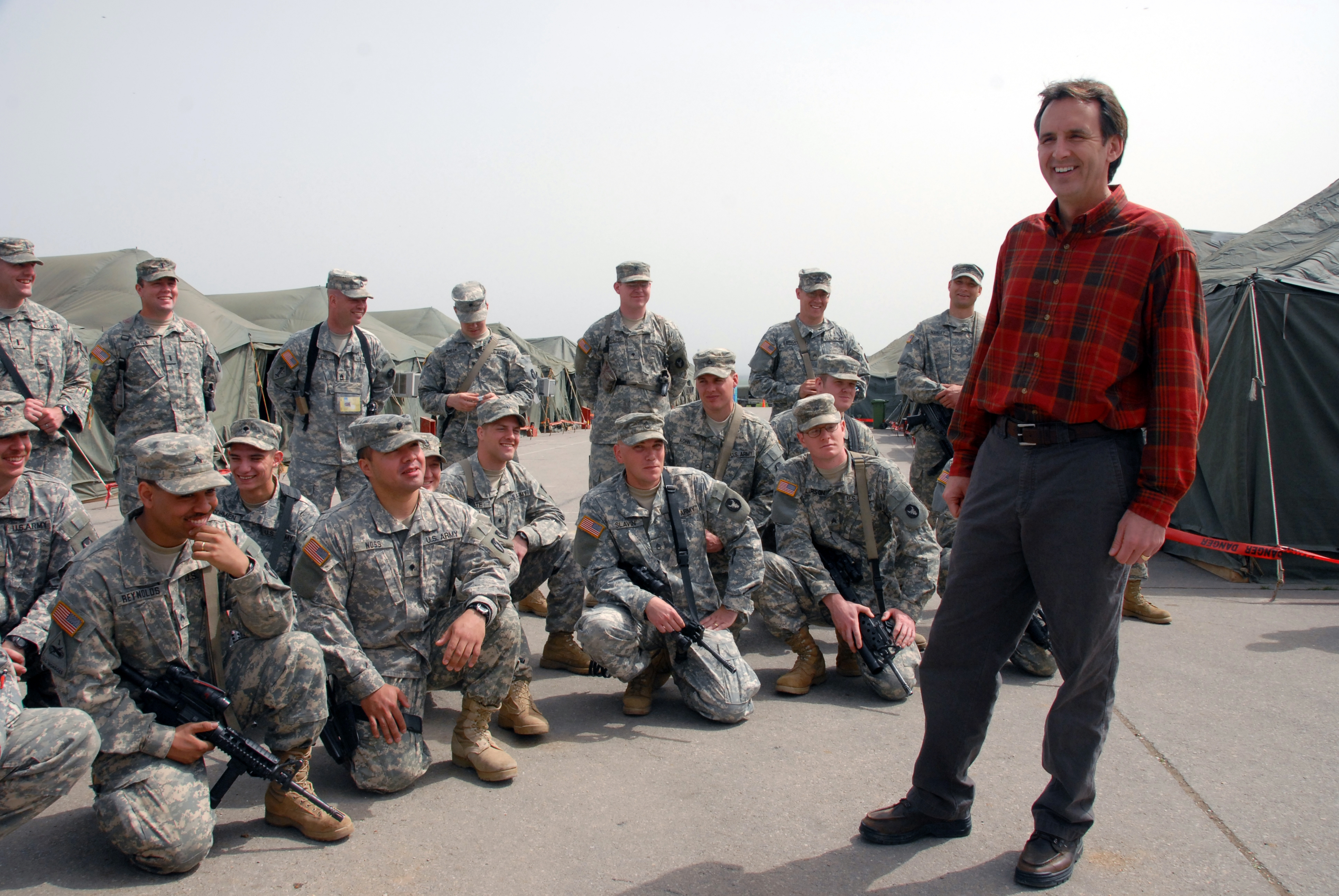
Soldiers of the division in Kosovo.

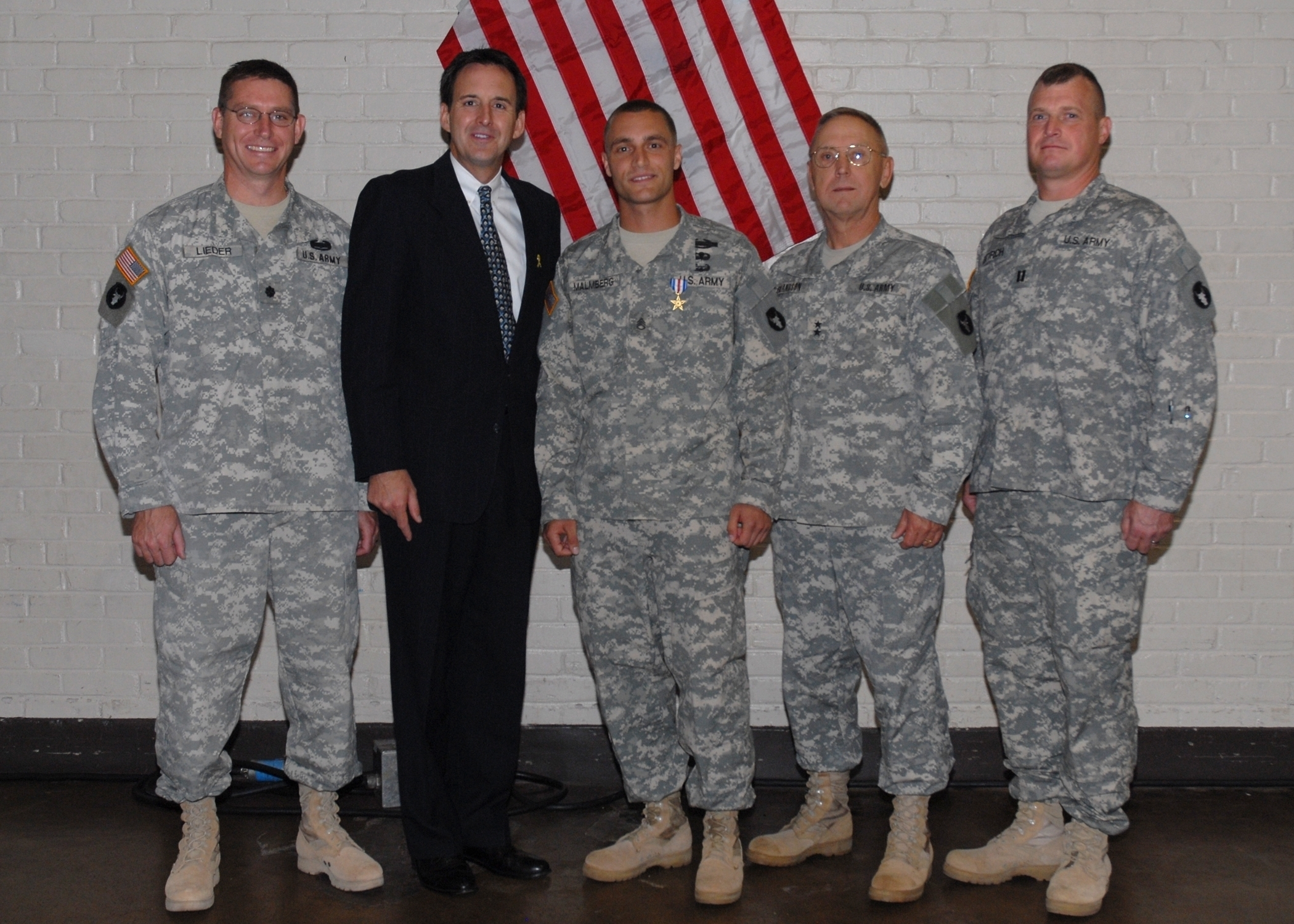
A soldier of the division receiving the Silver Star Medal in 2011.

The 34th Infantry Division has oversight of a Division Headquarters Battalion, four Brigade Combat Teams, a Division Artillery, a Combat Aviation Brigade and a Sustainment Brigade.

- 34th Infantry Division (MN NG)
  - Headquarters and Headquarters Battalion, 34th Infantry Division
  - 1st Armored Brigade Combat Team, 34th Infantry Division (MN NG)
    - Headquarters and Headquarters Company, 1st Armored Brigade Combat Team
    - 1st Squadron, 94th Cavalry Regiment (Armored Reconnaissance)
    - 1st Battalion, 145th Armor Regiment (OH NG)
    - 1st Battalion, 194th Armor Regiment
    - 2nd Battalion, 136th Infantry Regiment
    - 334th Brigade Engineer Battalion
  - 2nd Infantry Brigade Combat Team, 34th Infantry Division (IA NG)
    - Headquarters and Headquarters Company, 2nd Infantry Brigade Combat Team
    - 1st Squadron, 113th Cavalry Regiment, Reconnaissance Surveillance and Target Acquisition (IA NG)
    - 1st Battalion, 133rd Infantry Regiment (IA NG)
    - 1st Battalion, 168th Infantry Regiment (IA NG)
    - 2nd Battalion, 135th Infantry Regiment (MN NG)
    - 224th Brigade Engineer Battalion
  - 30th Mobile Brigade Combat Team (MBCT) (NC NG)
    - Headquarters and Headquarters Company
    - 1st Battalion, 119th Infantry Regiment (NC NG)
    - 1st Battalion, 120th Infantry Regiment (NC NG)
    - 2nd Battalion, 120th Infantry Regiment (NC NG)
  - 116th Cavalry Brigade Combat Team (Mobile Infantry) (ID NG)
    - Headquarters and Headquarters Company
    - 1st Battalion, 116th Cavalry Regiment (Mobile Infantry) (ID NG)
    - 2nd Battalion, 116th Cavalry Regiment (Mobile Infantry) (ID NG)
    - 1st Battalion, 221st Cavalry Regiment (Mobile Infantry) (NV NG)
  - 34th Division Artillery (MN NG)
    - Headquarters and Headquarters Company, 34th Division Artillery
    - 1st Battalion, 113th Field Artillery Regiment (NC NG; supports 30th Mobile Brigade Combat Team)
    - 1st Battalion, 125th Field Artillery Regiment (MN NG supports 1st Armored Brigade Combat Team, 34th Infantry Division)
    - 1st Battalion, 148th Field Artillery Regiment (ID NG; supports 116th Cavalry Brigade Combat Team (Mobile Infantry))
    - 1st Battalion, 194th Field Artillery Regiment (IA NG; supports 2nd Infantry Brigade Combat Team, 34th Infantry Division)
  - Combat Aviation Brigade, 34th Infantry Division (MN NG)
    - Headquarters and Headquarters Company, 34th Combat Aviation Brigade
    - 1st Battalion, 112th Aviation Regiment (Security & Support) (ND NG)
    - 2nd Battalion, 147th Aviation Regiment (Assault) (MN NG)
    - 1st Battalion, 183rd Aviation Regiment (Assault) (ID NG)
    - 1st Battalion, 189th Aviation Regiment (General Support) (MT NG)
    - 834th Aviation Support Battalion (MN NG)
  - 34th Division Sustainment Brigade (IL NG)
    - 1347th Division Sustainment Support Battalion, in Bloomington
    - 134th Brigade Support Battalion (MN NG supports 1st Armored Brigade Combat Team, 34th Infantry Division)
    - 145th Light Support Battalion (ID NG; supports 116th Cavalry Brigade Combat Team (Mobile Infantry))
    - 230th Light Support Battalion (NC NG; supports 30th Mobile Brigade Combat Team)
    - 334th Brigade Support Battalion (IA NG; supports 2nd Infantry Brigade Combat Team, 34th Infantry Division)
  - 157th Maneuver Enhancement Brigade (WI NG) — will convert to a Protection Brigade

=== Attached units ===
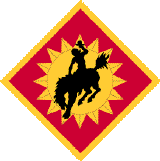
- 115th Field Artillery Brigade (WY NG)
  - 1st Battalion, 121st Field Artillery Regiment (WI NG)
  - 1st Battalion, 147th Field Artillery Regiment (SD NG)
  - 1st Battalion, 151st Field Artillery Regiment (MN NG)
  - 2nd Battalion, 300th Field Artillery Regiment (WY NG)
  - 960th Brigade Support Battalion (WY NG)
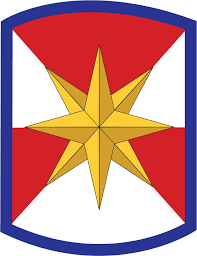
- 347th Regional Support Group (formerly 34th Division Support Command)
  - Headquarters and Headquarters Company, 347th Regional Support Group
  - 147th Personnel Services Battalion
  - 347th Personnel Services Detachment
  - 34th Military Police Company
  - 257th Military Police Company
  - 114th Transportation Company
  - 204th Medical Company
  - 147th Financial Management Support Detachment
  - 247th Financial Management Support Detachment
  - 1903rd Acquisition Team
  - 1904th Acquisition Team
  - 34th Infantry Division Band
  - Service Battery, 1st Battalion, 214th Field Artillery Regiment (Service Battery,1-214th Field Artillery) (GA NG)
- Companies A and B, 2nd Battalion, 123rd Armor Regiment (KY NG)

=== Former units ===
- 32nd Infantry Brigade Combat Team (WI NG)
  - Headquarters and Headquarters Company, 32nd Infantry Brigade Combat Team
  - 1st Squadron, 105th Cavalry Regiment, Reconnaissance Surveillance And Target Acquisition
  - 1st Battalion, 128th Infantry Regiment
  - 2nd Battalion, 127th Infantry Regiment
  - 3rd Battalion, 126th Infantry Regiment
  - 1st Battalion, 120th Field Artillery Regiment
  - 173rd Brigade Engineer Battalion
  - 132nd Brigade Support Battalion

== Leaders ==
Commanders
- MG Augustus P. Blocksom, 1917
- BG Frank G. Mauldin, 1917, ad interim
- MG Augustus P. Blocksom, 1917
- BG Hubert A. Allen, 1917, ad interim
- MG Augustus P. Blocksom, 1917
- BG Frank G. Mauldin, 1918, ad interim
- BG John A. Johnston, 1918 ad interim
- BG Hubert A. Allen, 1918, ad interim
- BG John A. Johnston, 1918
- MG Beaumont B. Buck, 1918
- BG John A. Johnston, 1918 – 1918, ad intim
- MG Mathew A. Tinley, 1924 – 1940
- MG George E. Leach, 1940 – 1941
- MG Ellard A. Walsh, 1941 – 1941
- MG Russel P. Hartle, 1941 – 1942
- MG Charles W. Ryder, 1942 – 1944
- MG Charles L. Bolte, 1944 – 1945
- MG Ray C. Fountain, 1946 – 1954
- MG Warren C. Wood, 1954 – 1962
- MG Frank P. Williams, 1962 – 1967
- MG David H. Lueck, 1991 – 1992
- MG Clayton A. Hovda, 1992 – 1995
- MG Gerald A. Miller, 1995 – 1998
- MG Rodney R. Hannula, 1998 – 2000
- MG Larry W. Shellito, 2000 – 2004
- MG Rick D. Erlandson, 2004 – 2007
- MG Richard C. Nash, 2007 – 2010
- MG David J. Elicerio, 2010 – 2013
- MG Neal G. Loidolt, 2013 – 2017
- MG Jon A. Jensen, 2017 – 2017
- MG Benjamin J. Corell, 2017 – 2019
- MG Michael D. Wickman, 2019 – 2022
- MG Charles Kemper, 2022 – 2025
- BG Joseph Sharkey, 2025 – present

Senior Enlisted Leaders:

- CSM Ronald E. Muehlbauer, 1988 – 1993
- CSM Charles J. Benda, 1993 – 1998
- CSM Robert L. Boone, 1998 – 2002
- CSM Stephen D. Rannenberg, 2002 – 2004
- CSM Ronald Kness, 2004 – 2007
- CSM Douglas L. Julin, 2007 – 2012
- CSM Joel M. Arnold, 2012 – 2015
- CSM John M. Lepowski, 2015 – 2018
- CSM Joseph J. Hjelmstad, 2018 – 2019
- CSM Stephen E. Whitehead, 2019 – 2022
- CSM Matthew Erickson, 2023 – 2024
- CSM Marc Dempsey, 2025 – present

== Legacy and memorials ==
In 2000, the Minnesota Legislature renamed all of Interstate 35 in Minnesota the "34th Division (Red Bull) Highway," in honour of the division and its service in the World Wars.

On 7 May 2023, a monument honouring the 34th Infantry Division was dedicated at Fort Snelling National Cemetery near Minneapolis, Minnesota. World War II veteran Donald Halverson, who served with the division in North Africa and Italy, unveiled the monument.

A memorial to the division also stands at Monte Pantano in Italy, near the site where the 34th fought in late 1943 during the Winter Line campaign.

== Bibliography ==
- Davis Jr., Henry Blaine (1998). Generals in Khaki. Pentland Press, Inc. ISBN 1571970886. OCLC 40298151.
