= Miscellaneous shoulder sleeve insignia of the United States Army =

Cloth emblems on US Army uniforms

Shoulder sleeve insignia (SSI) are cloth emblems worn on the shoulders of US Army uniforms to identify the primary headquarters to which a soldier is assigned. Most military units smaller than brigades do not have SSI, but rather wear the SSI of a higher headquarters. Insignia of units that are no longer active can be found at Obsolete shoulder sleeve insignia of the United States Army.

== Army elements to joint commands / joint forces ==
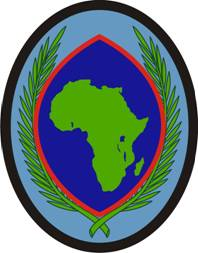
US Africa Command

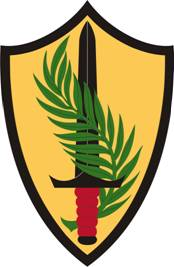
US Central Command

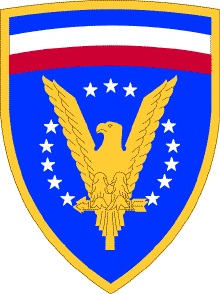
US European Command

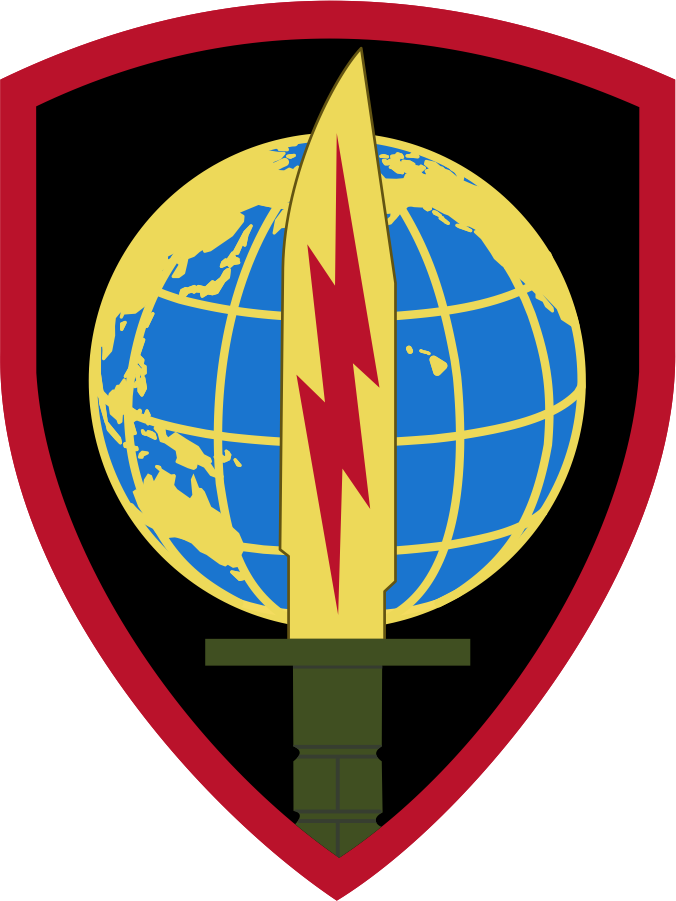
US Indo-Pacific Command

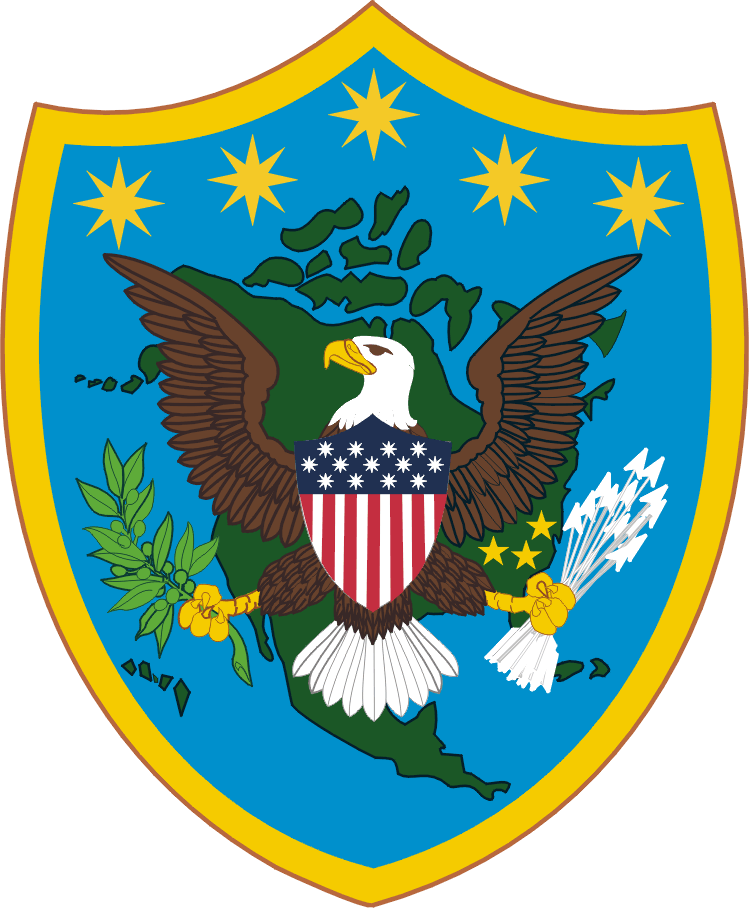
US Northern Command

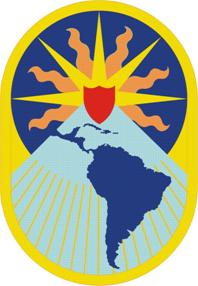
US Southern Command

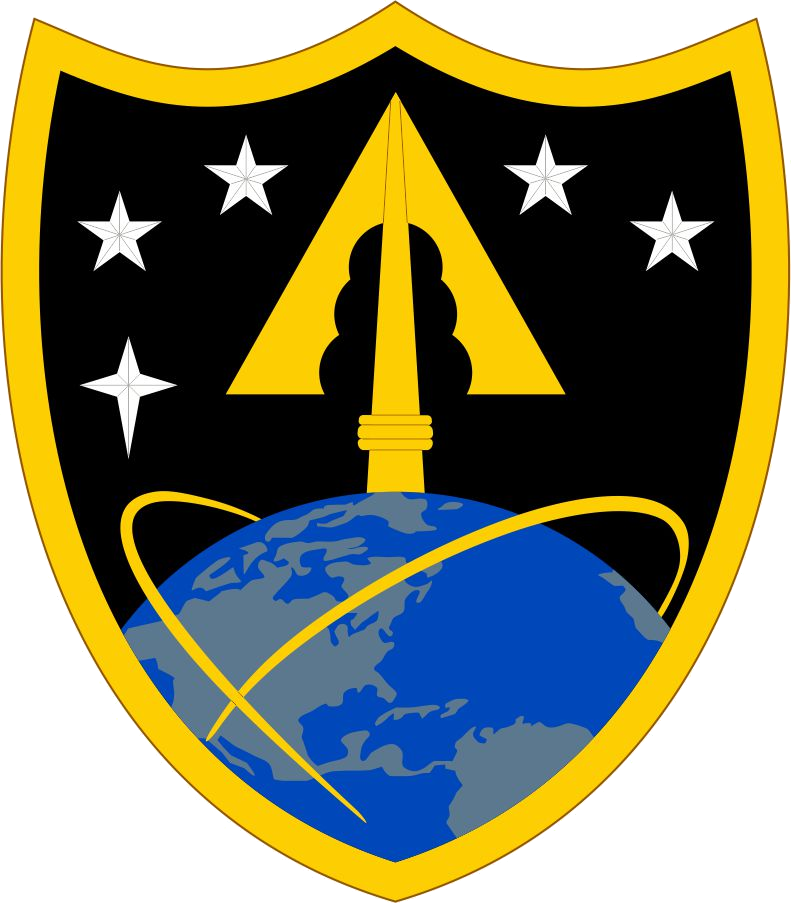
US Space Command

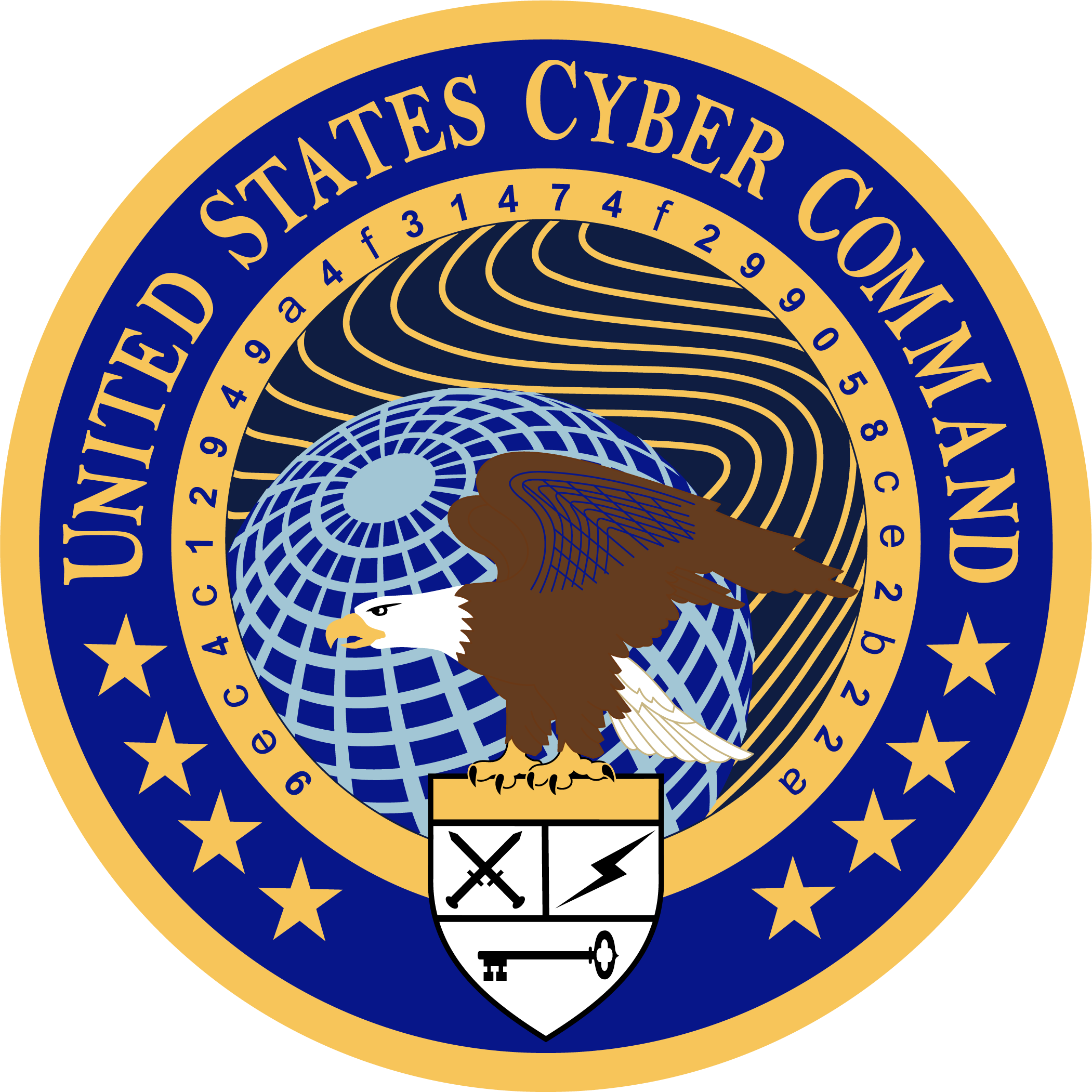
US Cyber Command

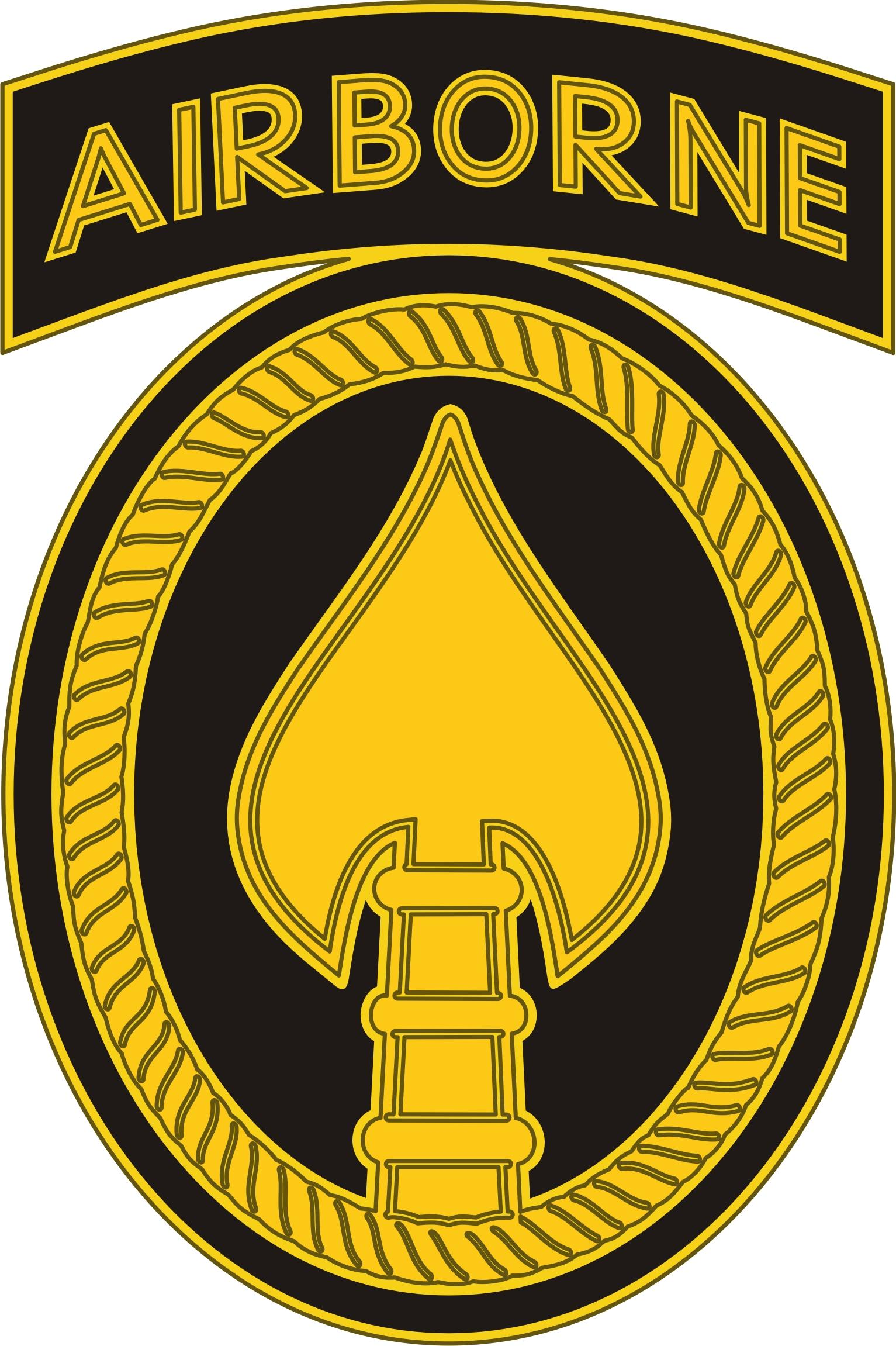
US Special Operations Command

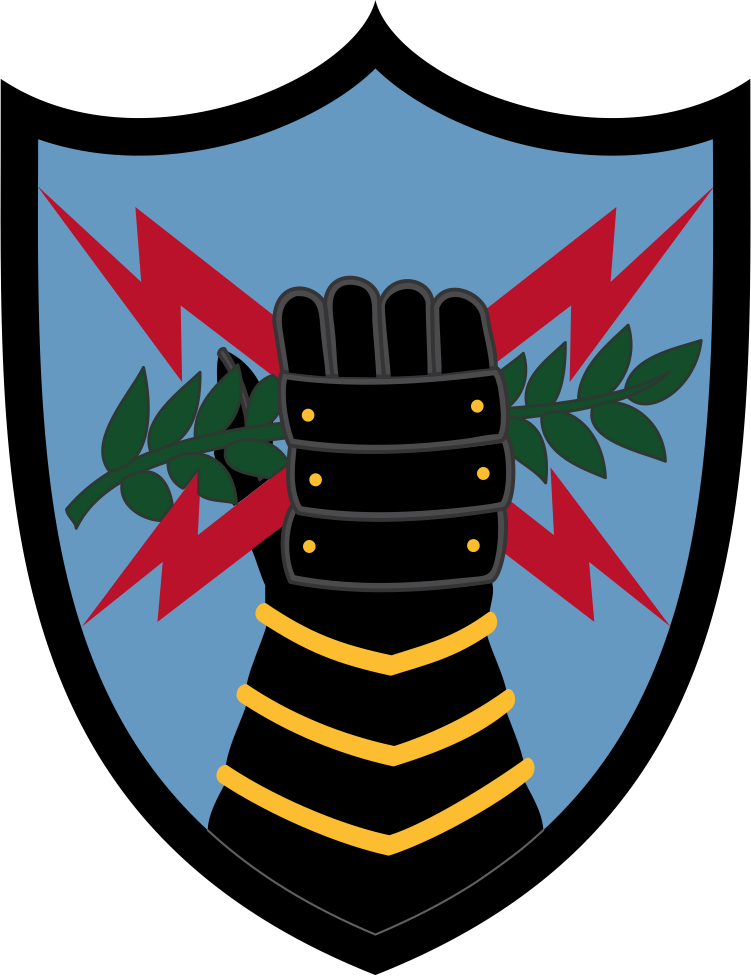
US Strategic Command

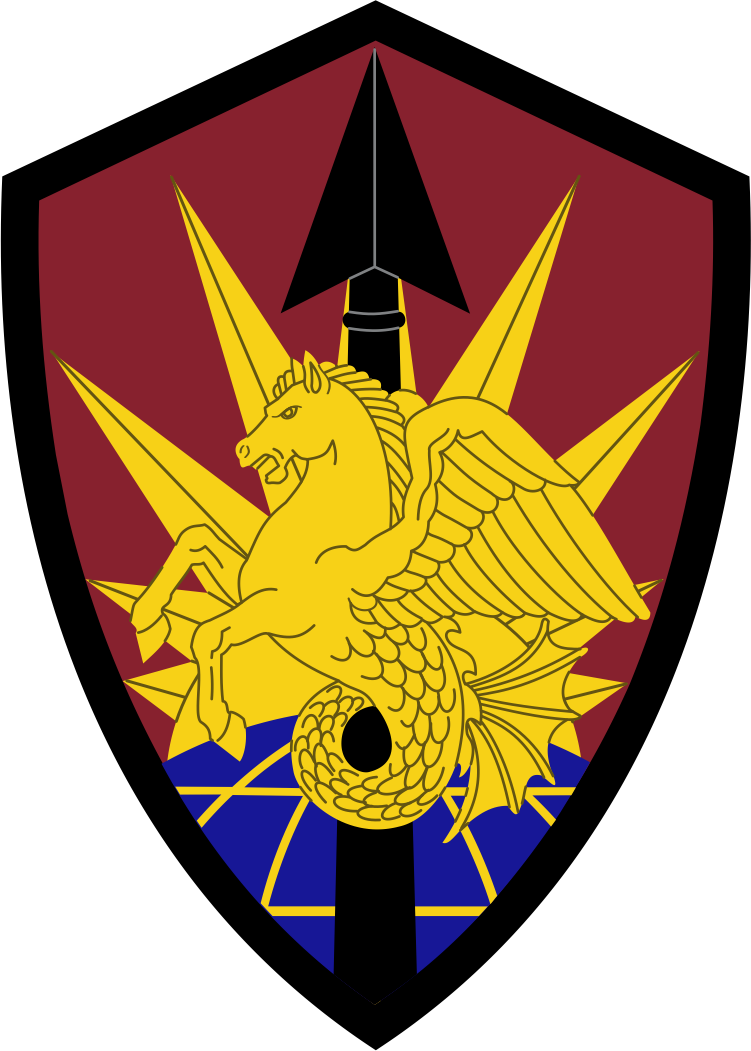
US Transportation Command

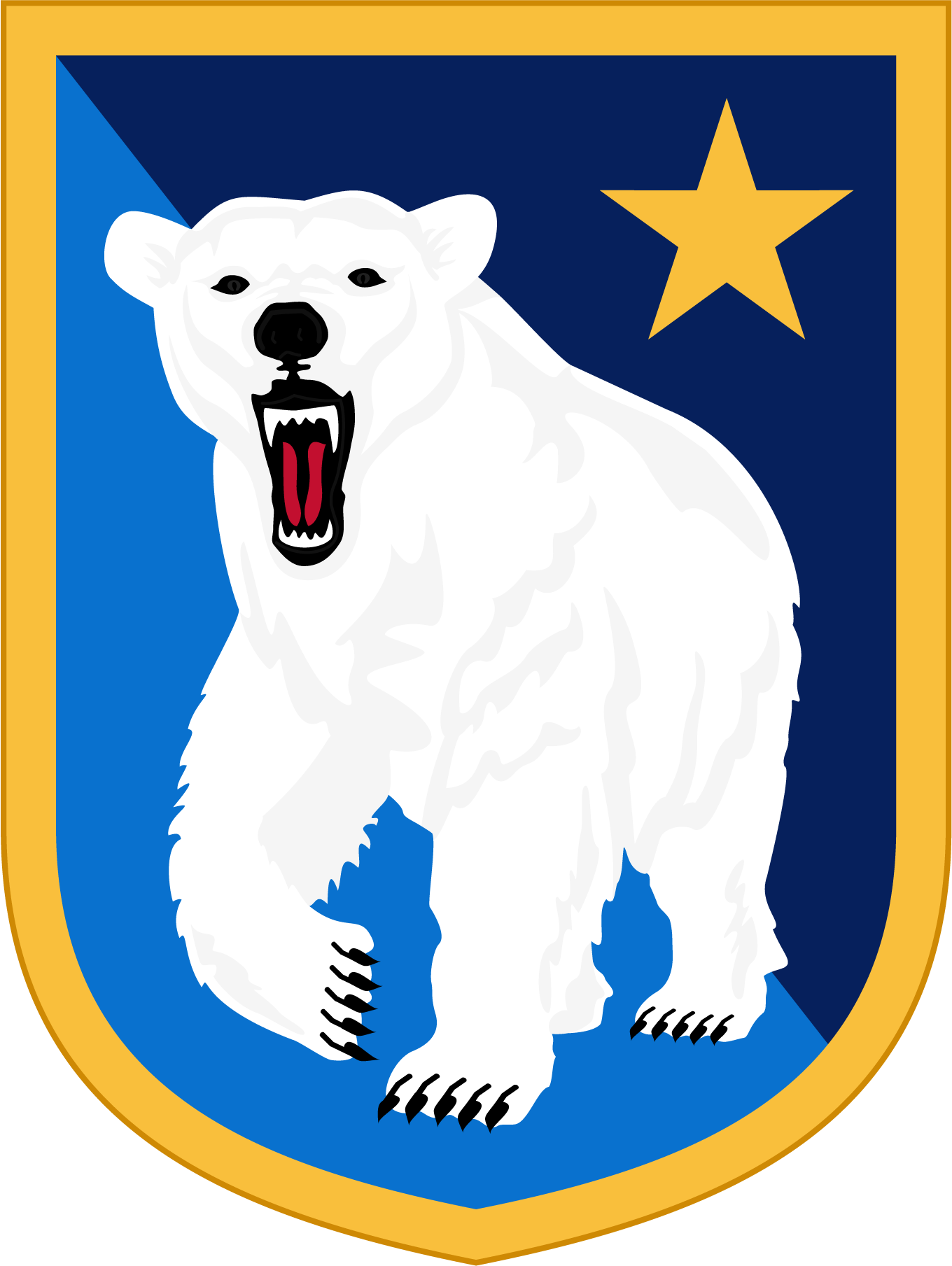
US Alaskan Command

US Forces Korea

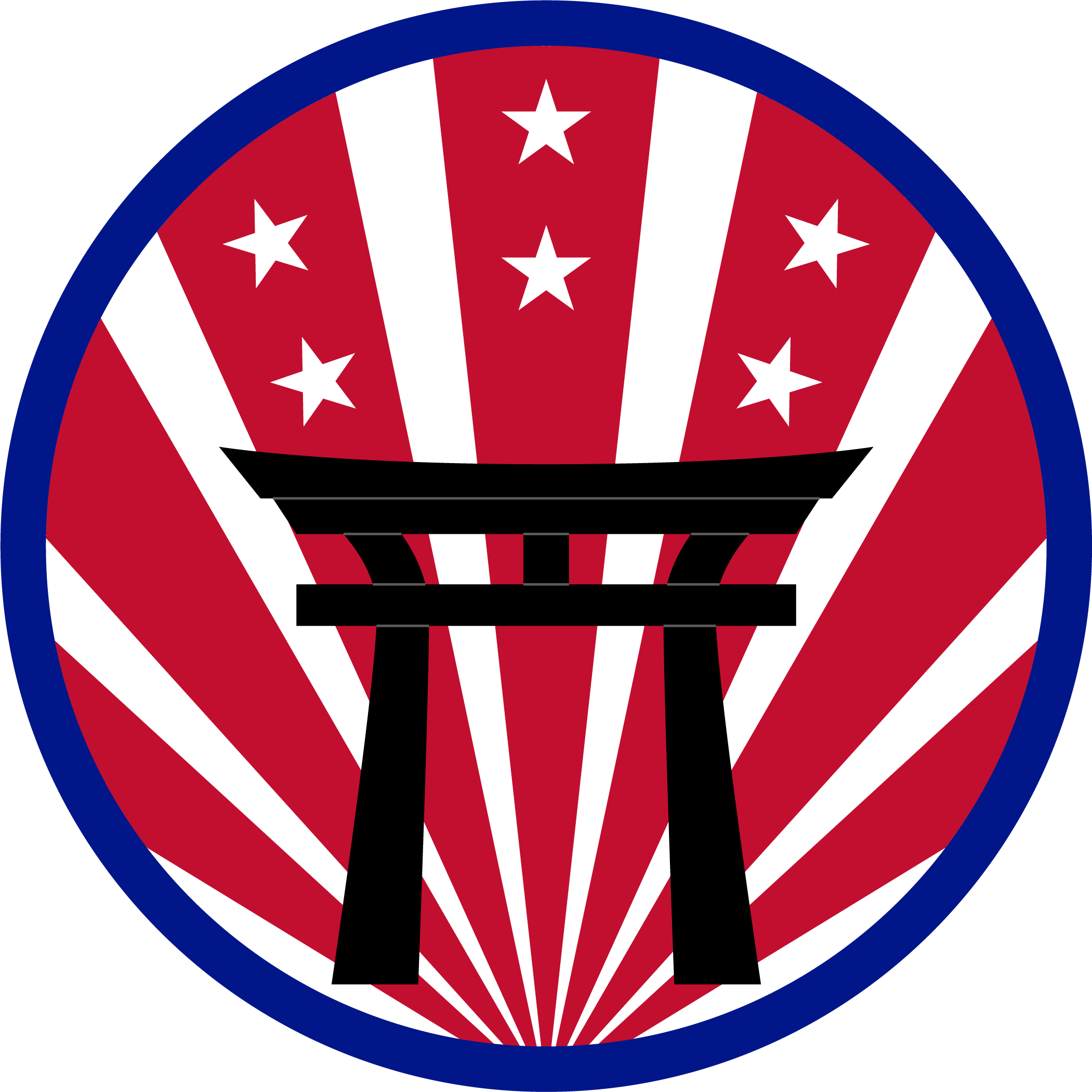
US Forces Japan

== Commands / field armies / corps / other ==
Army Central

Army Europe and Africa

Army North

Army Pacific

Army South

Army Japan, Army Pacific

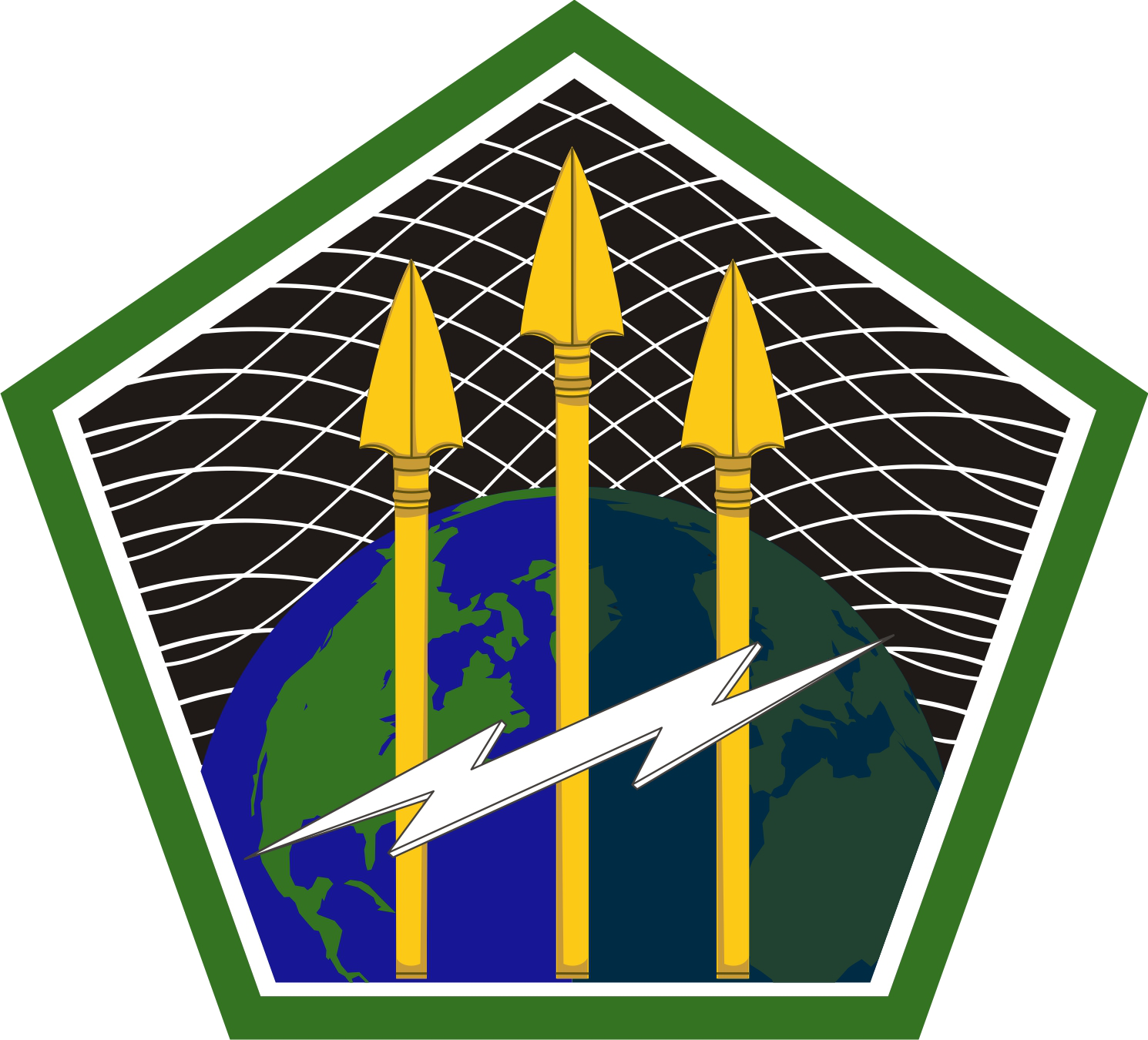
Army Cyber Command

Army Transportation Command

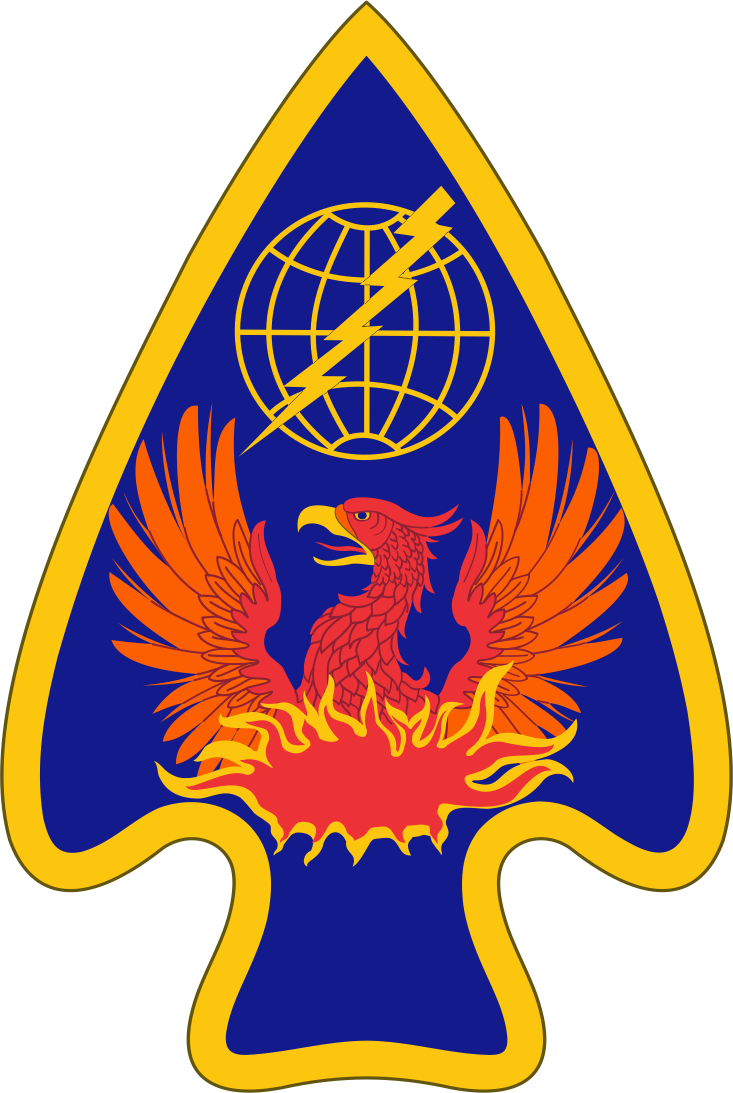
Air Traffic Services Command

Acquisition Support Center

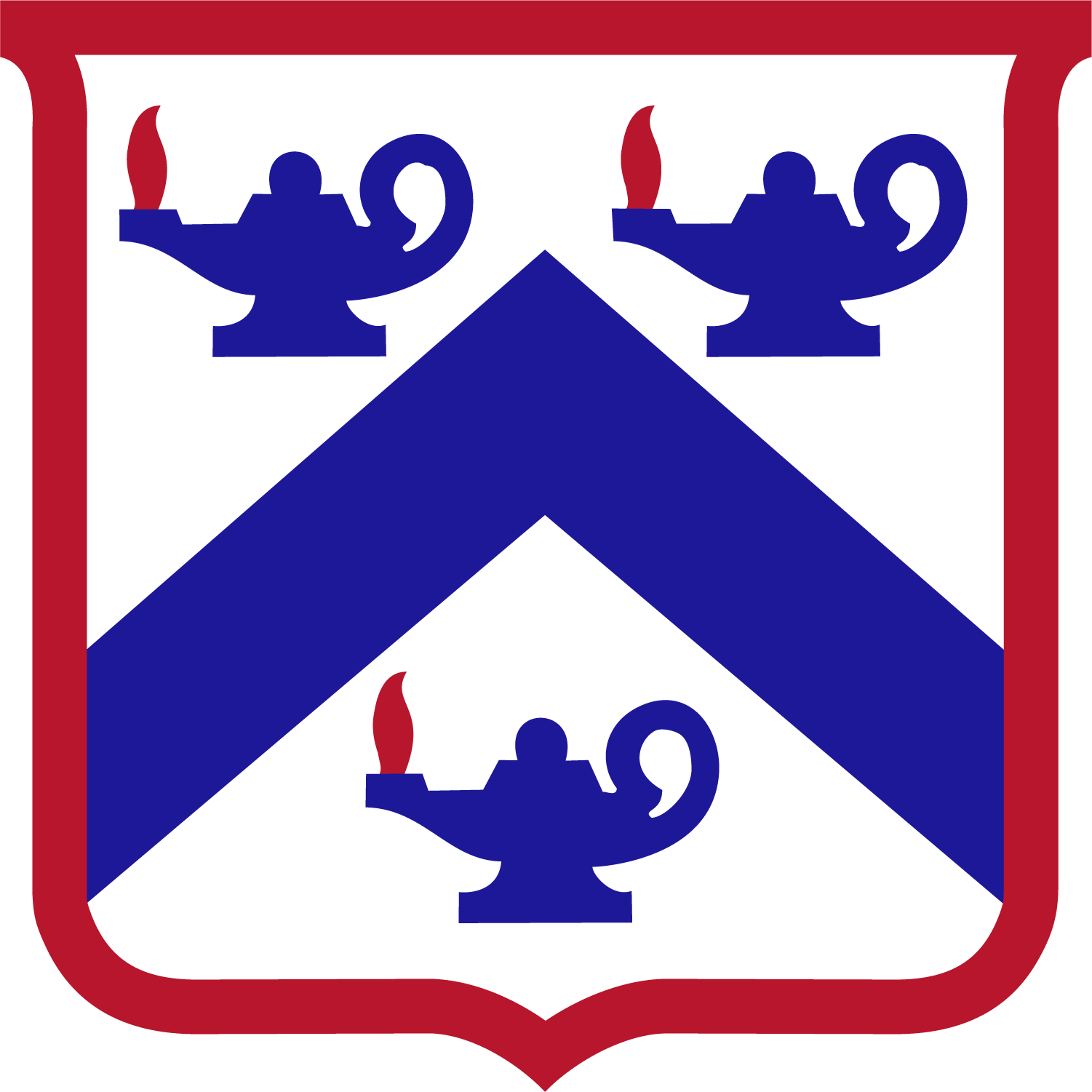
Combined Arms Command

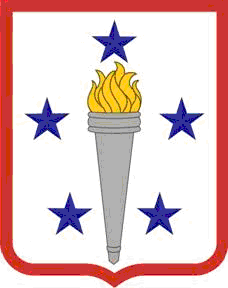
Combined Arms Support Command (of Sustainment Center of Excellence)

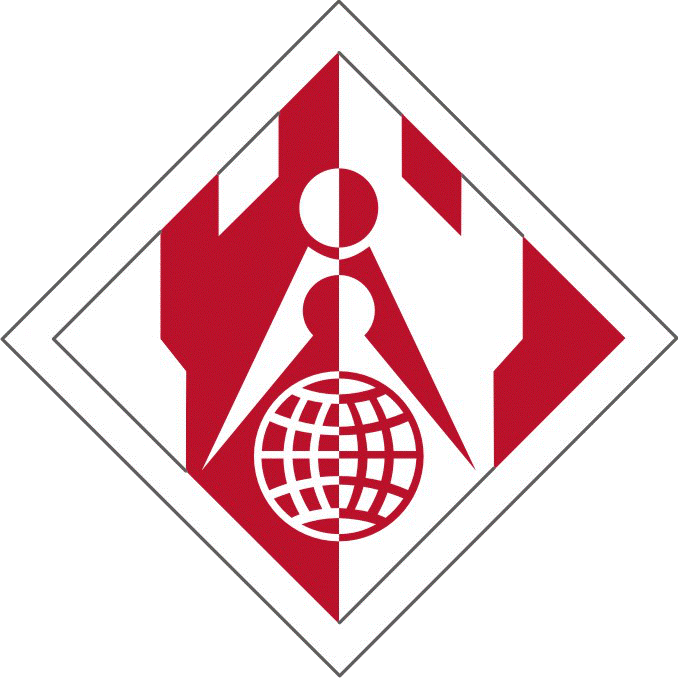
Corps of Engineers

Corrections Command

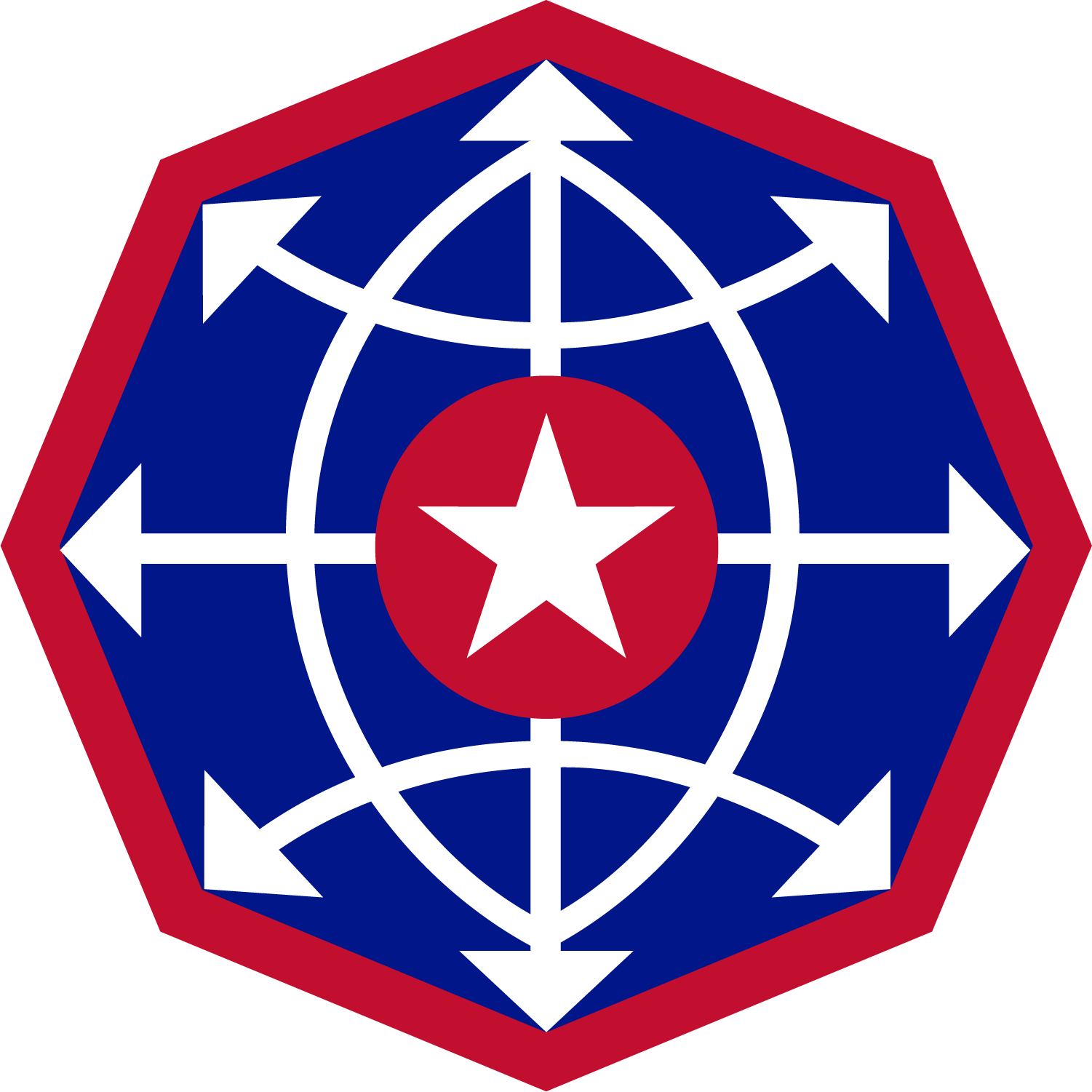
Criminal Investigation Division

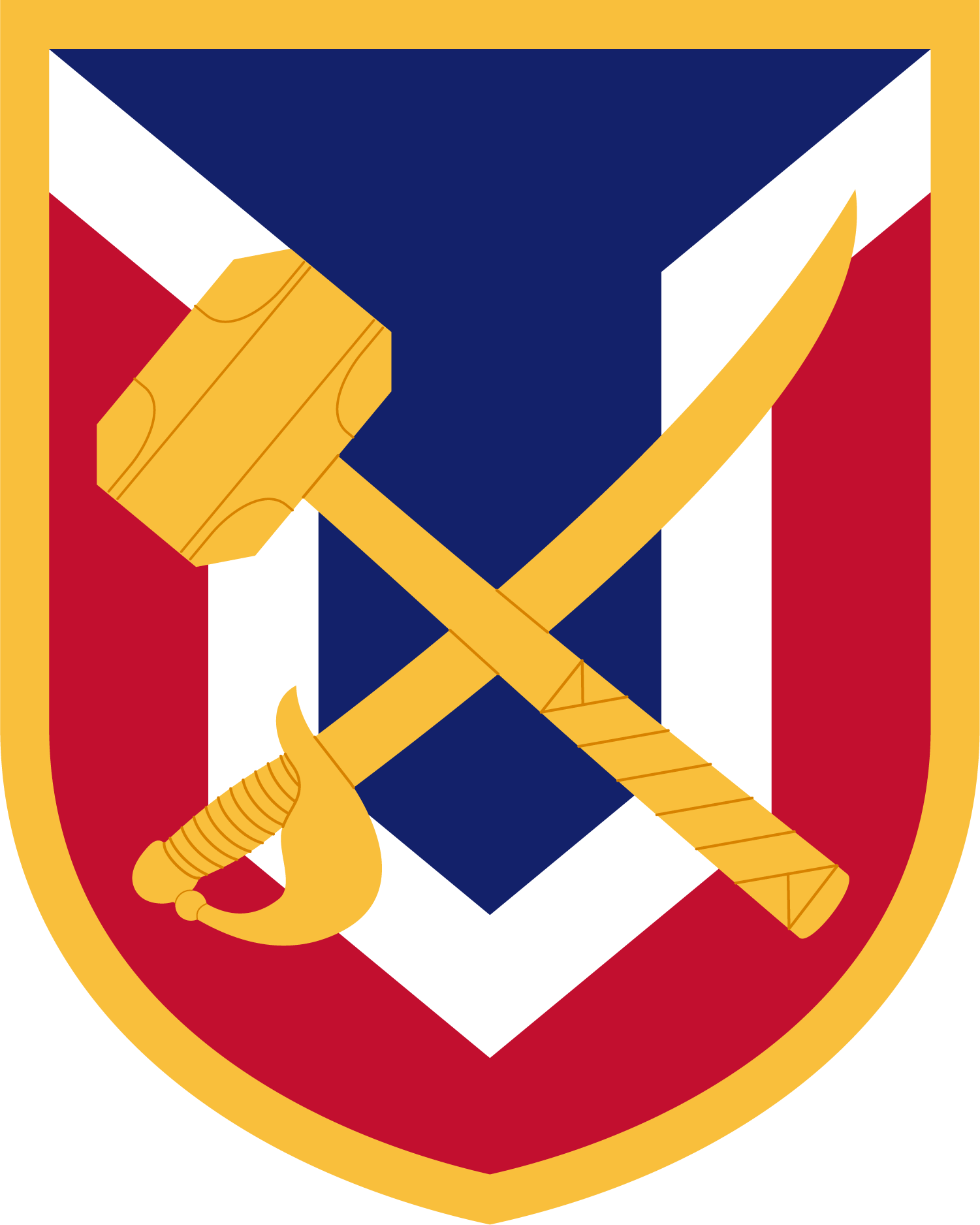
Futures and Concepts Command

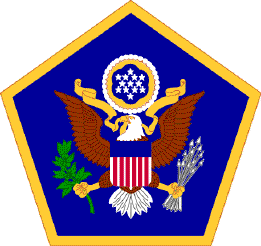
Headquarters Company, United States Army

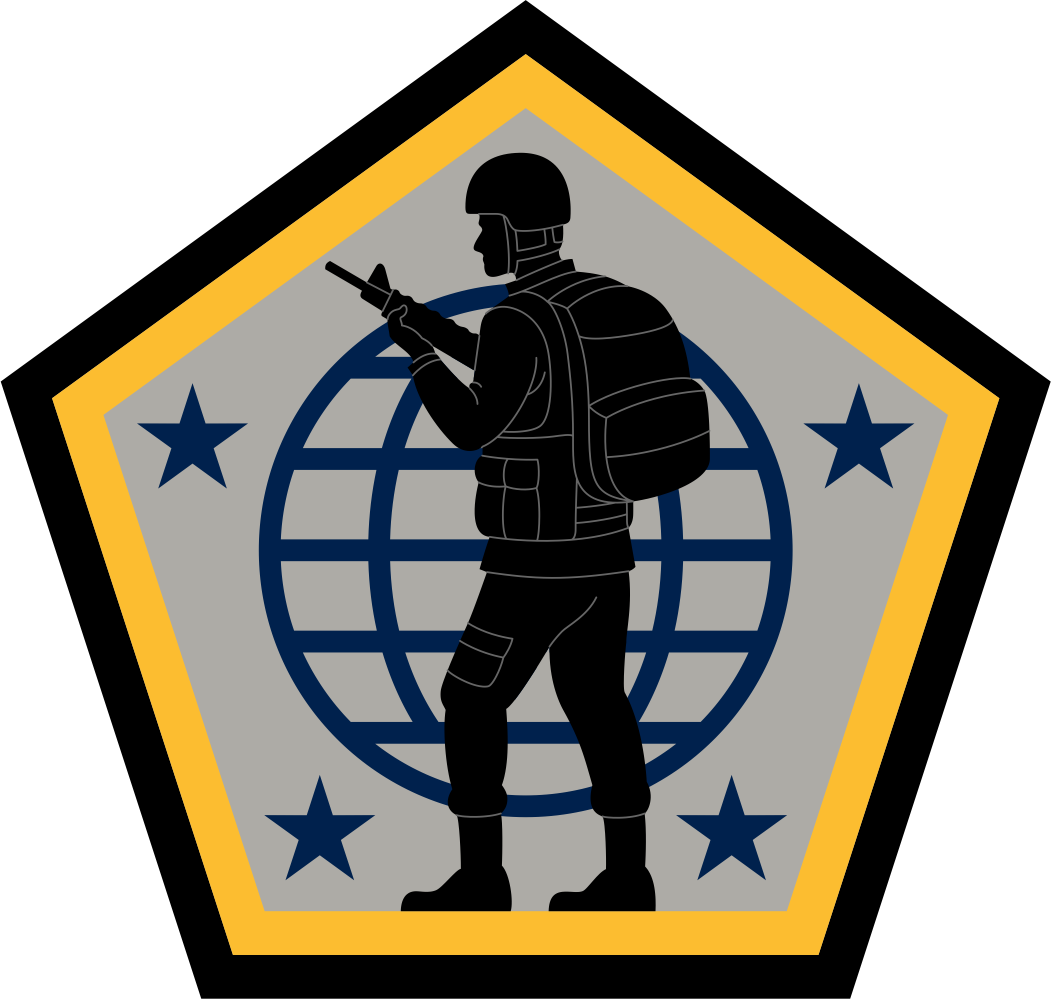
Human Resources Command

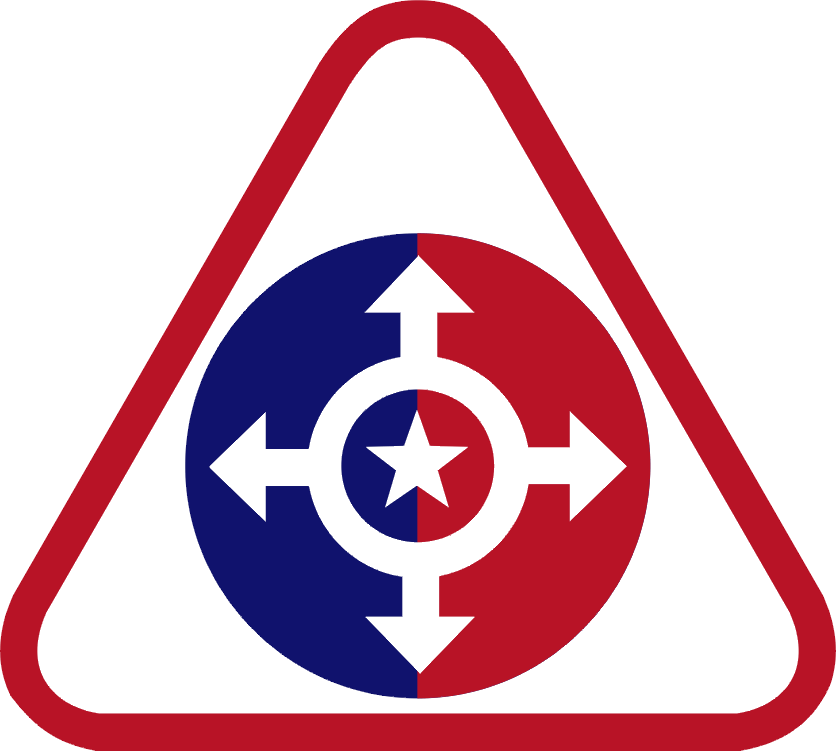
Individual Ready Reserve

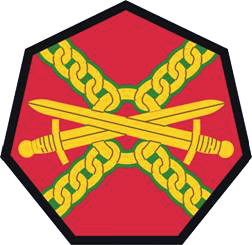
Installation Management Command

Intelligence and Security Command

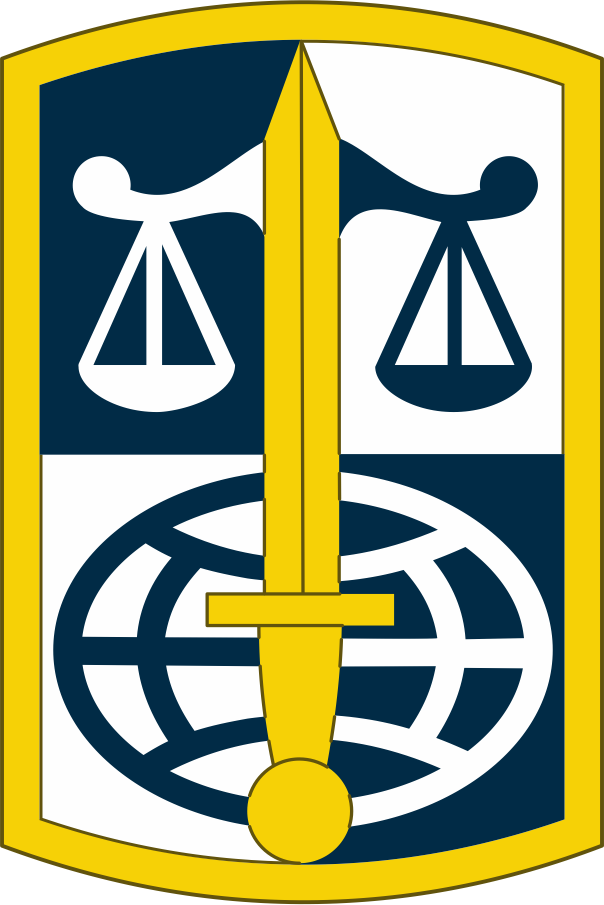
Legal Services Agency

Materiel Command

Medical Command

Military District of Washington

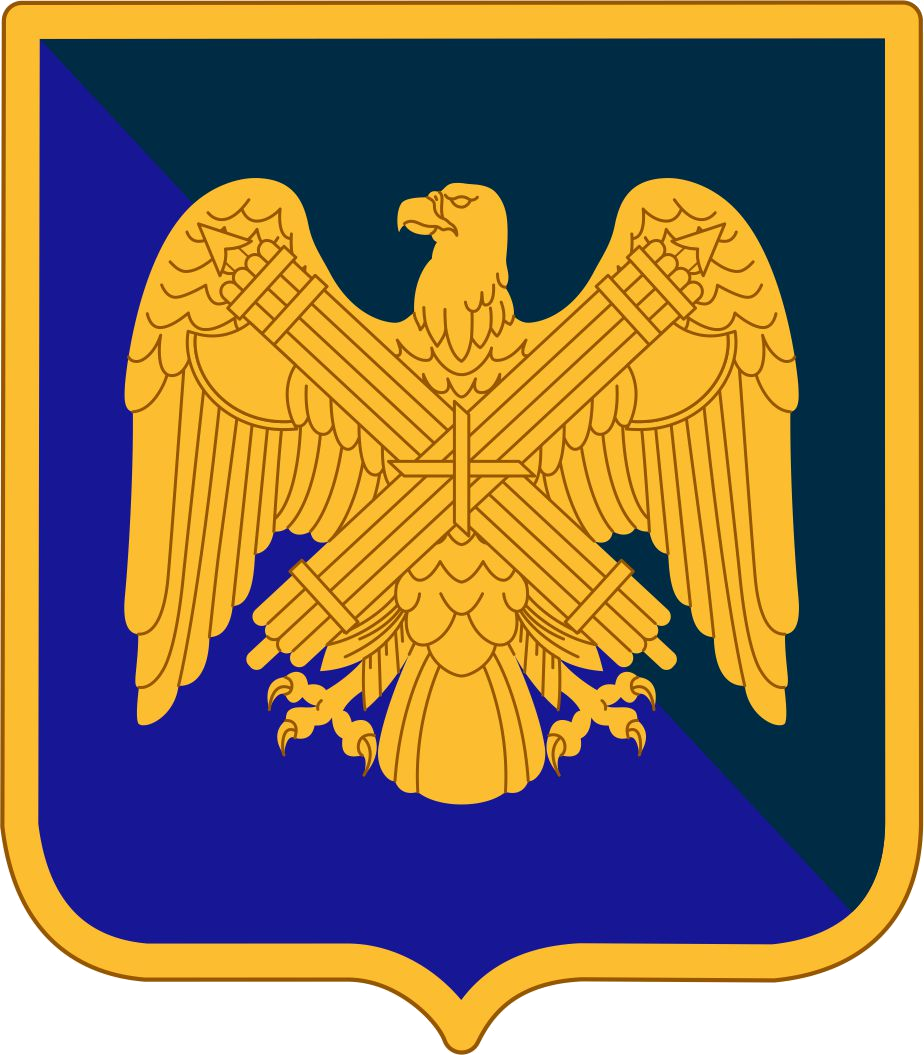
National Guard Bureau

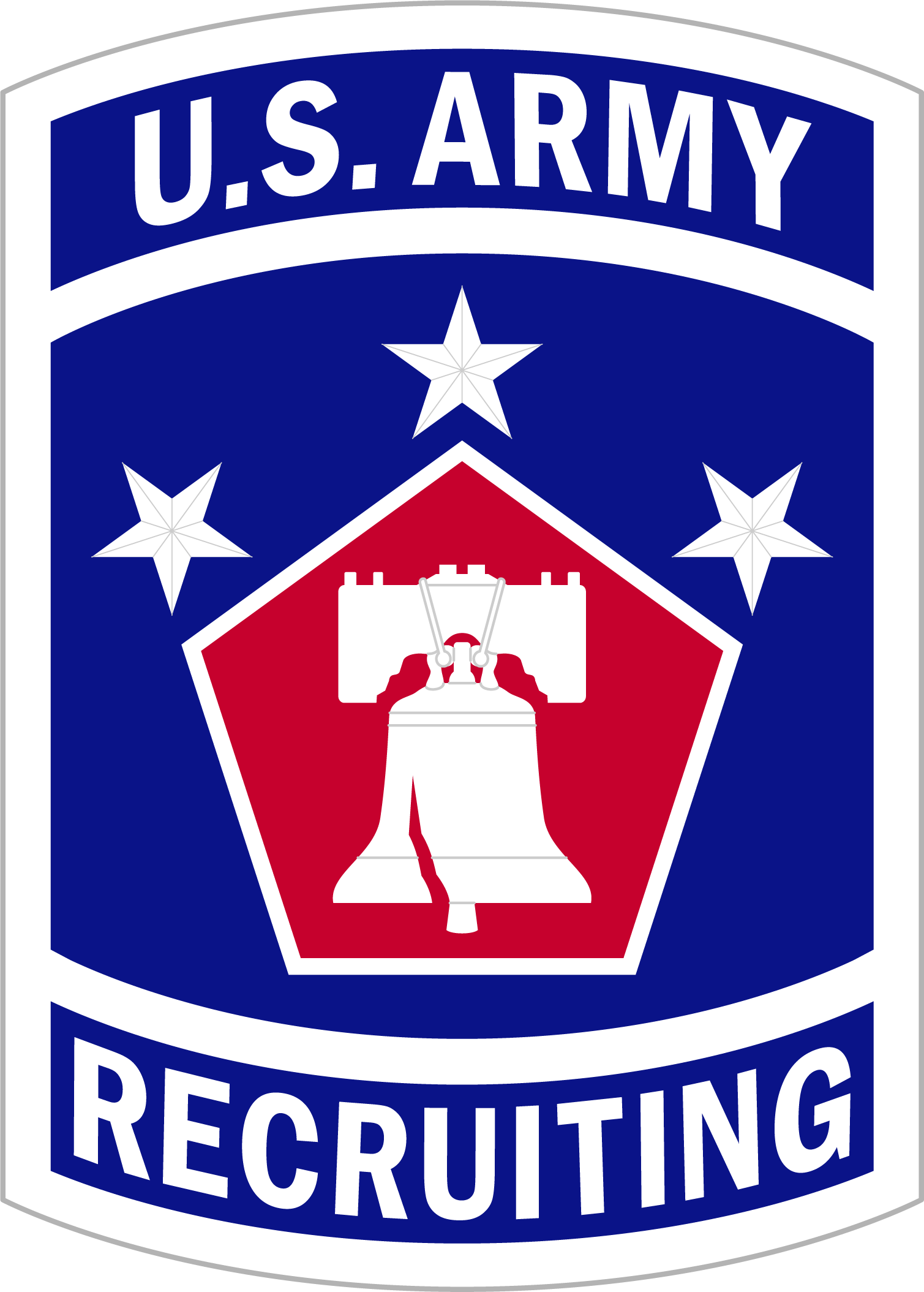
Recruiting Command

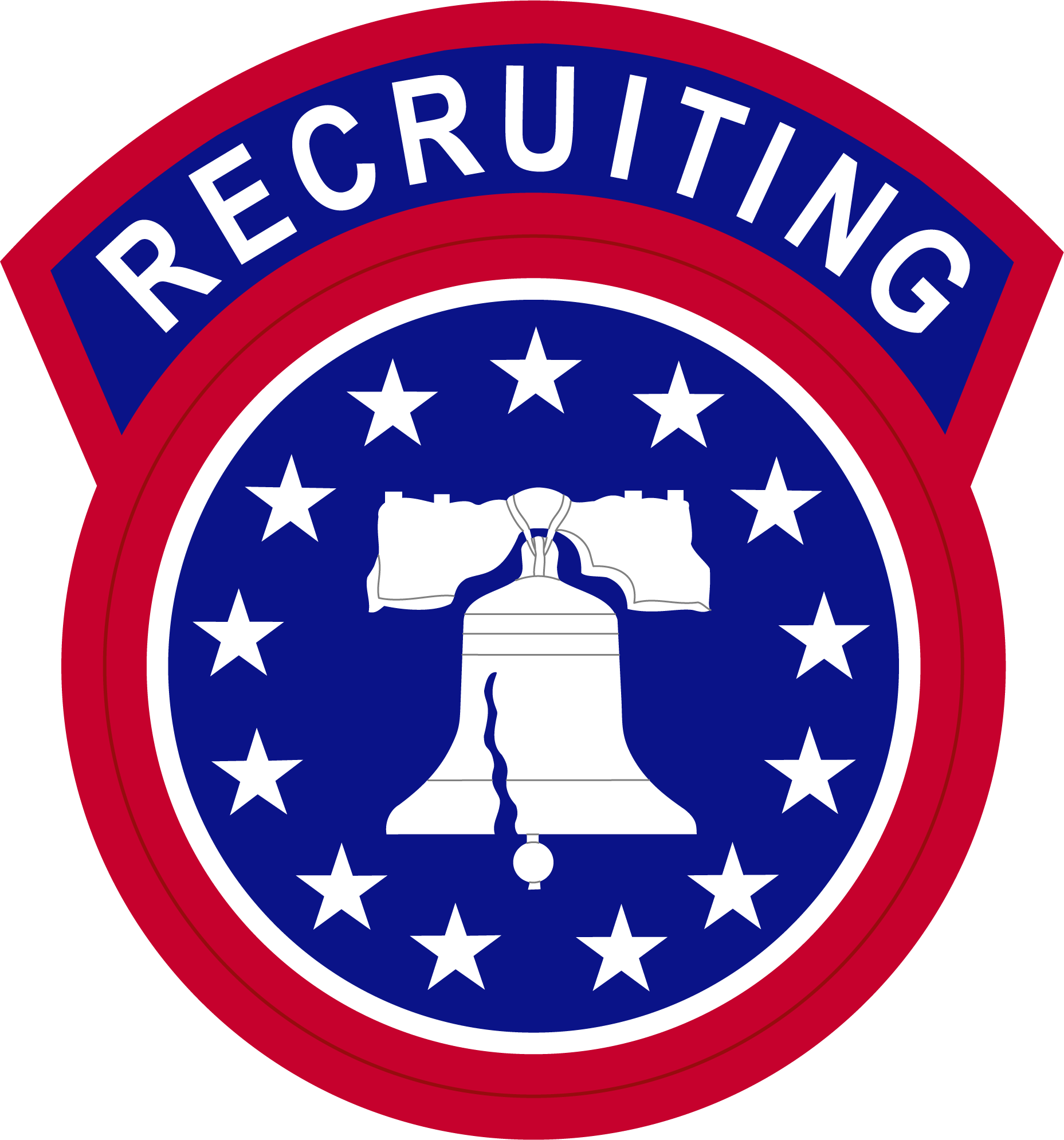
Recruiting Division

Reserve Command

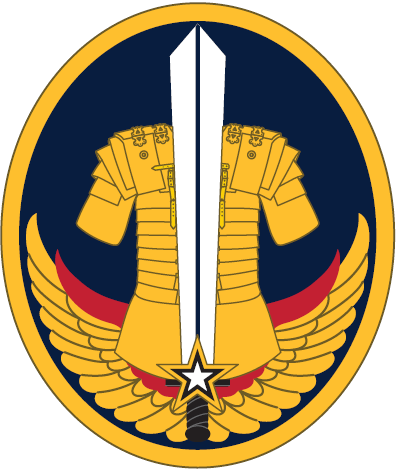
Reserve Careers Group

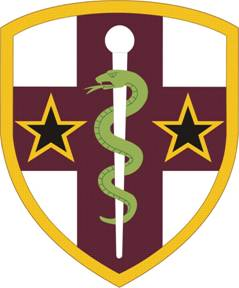
Reserve Medical Command

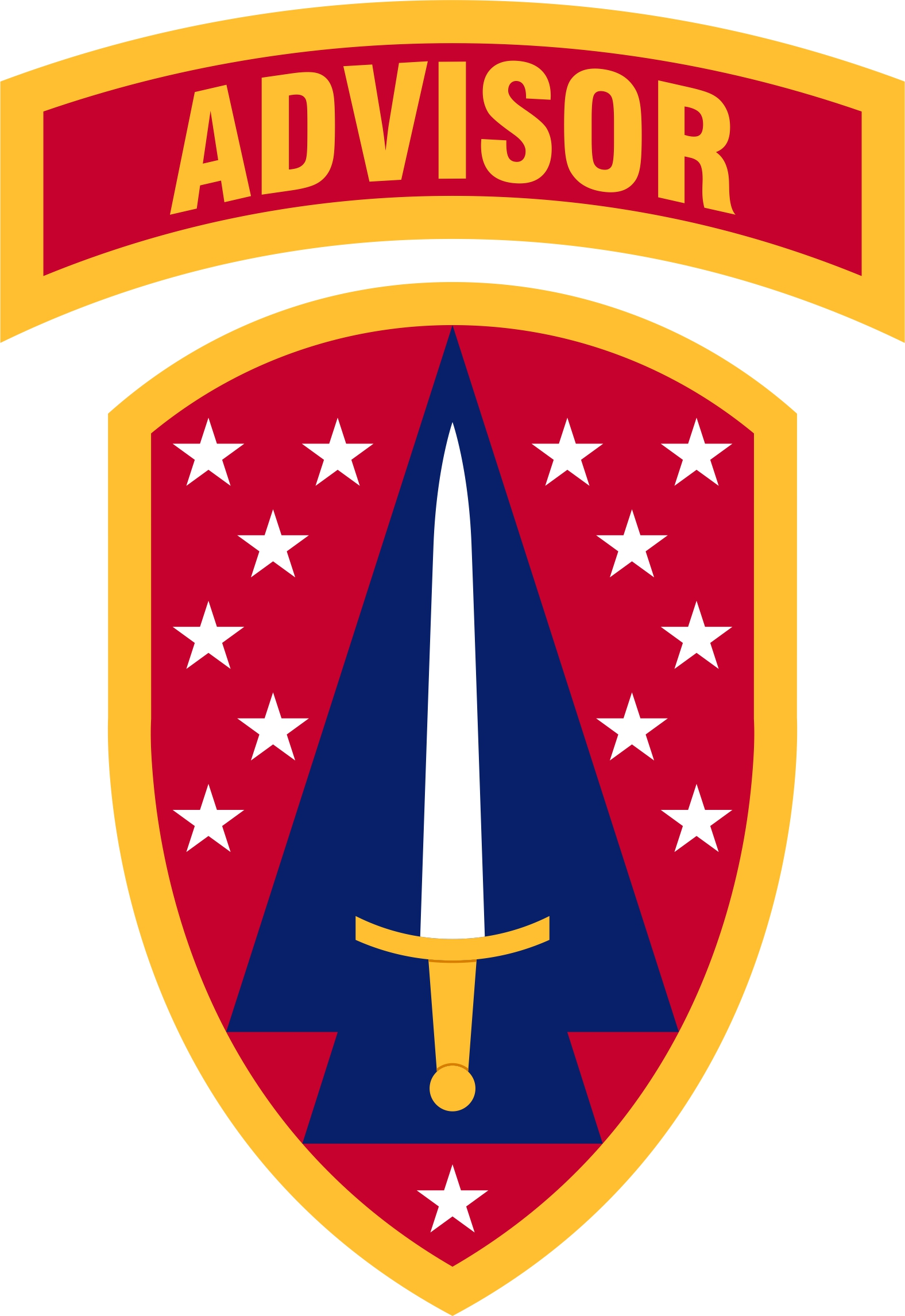
Security Force Assistance Command

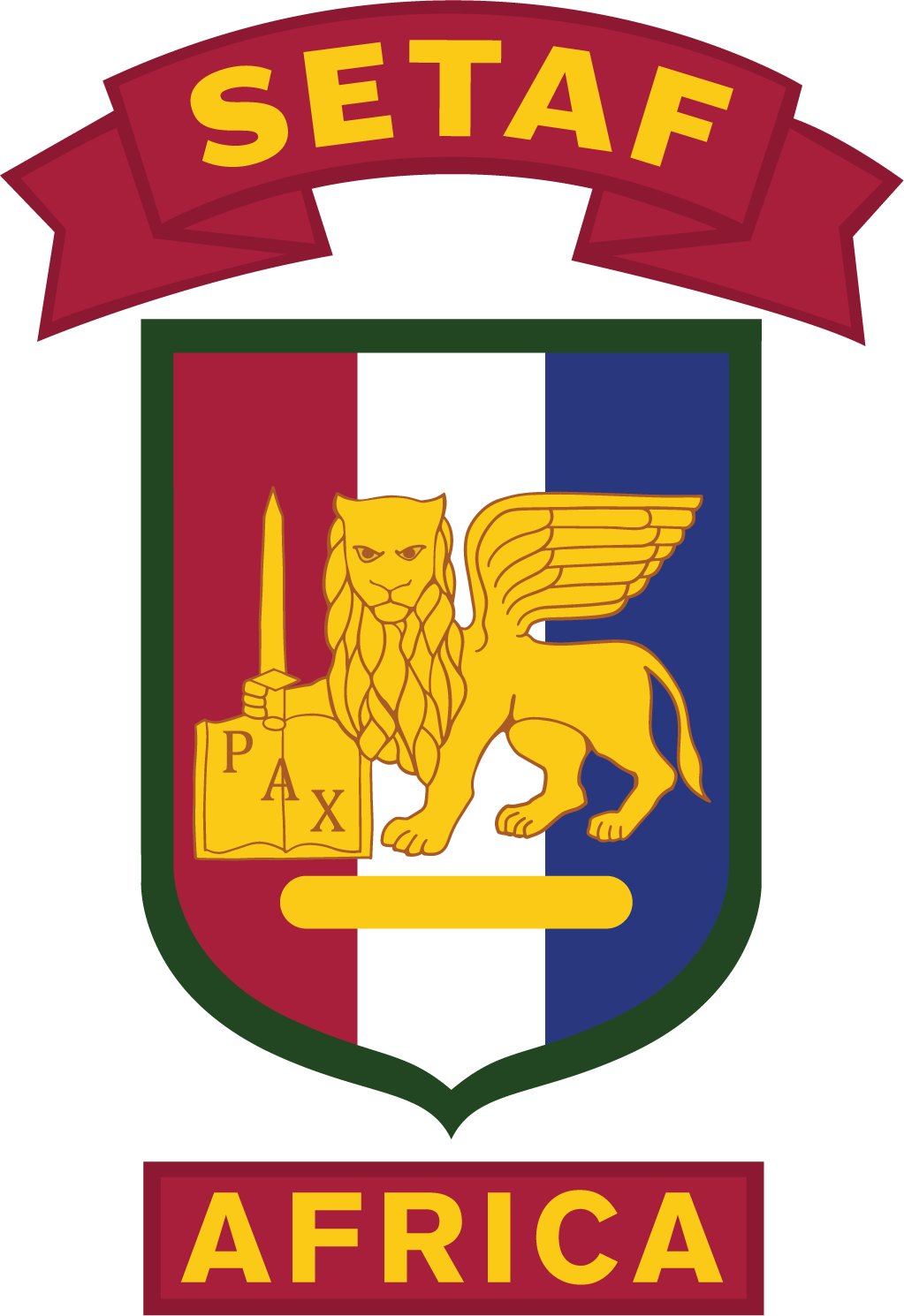
Southern European Task Force, Africa

Special Operations Command

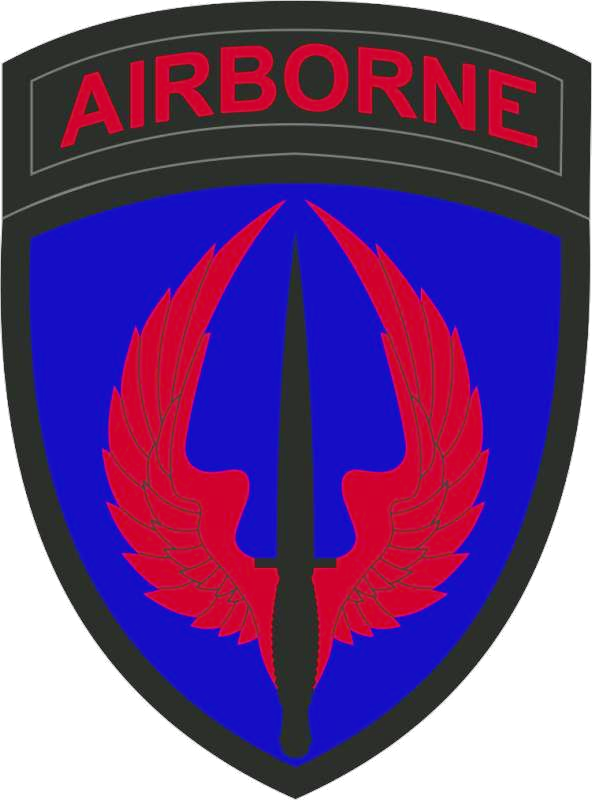
Special Operations Aviation Command

Space and Missile Defense Command

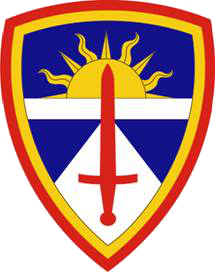
Test and Evaluation Command

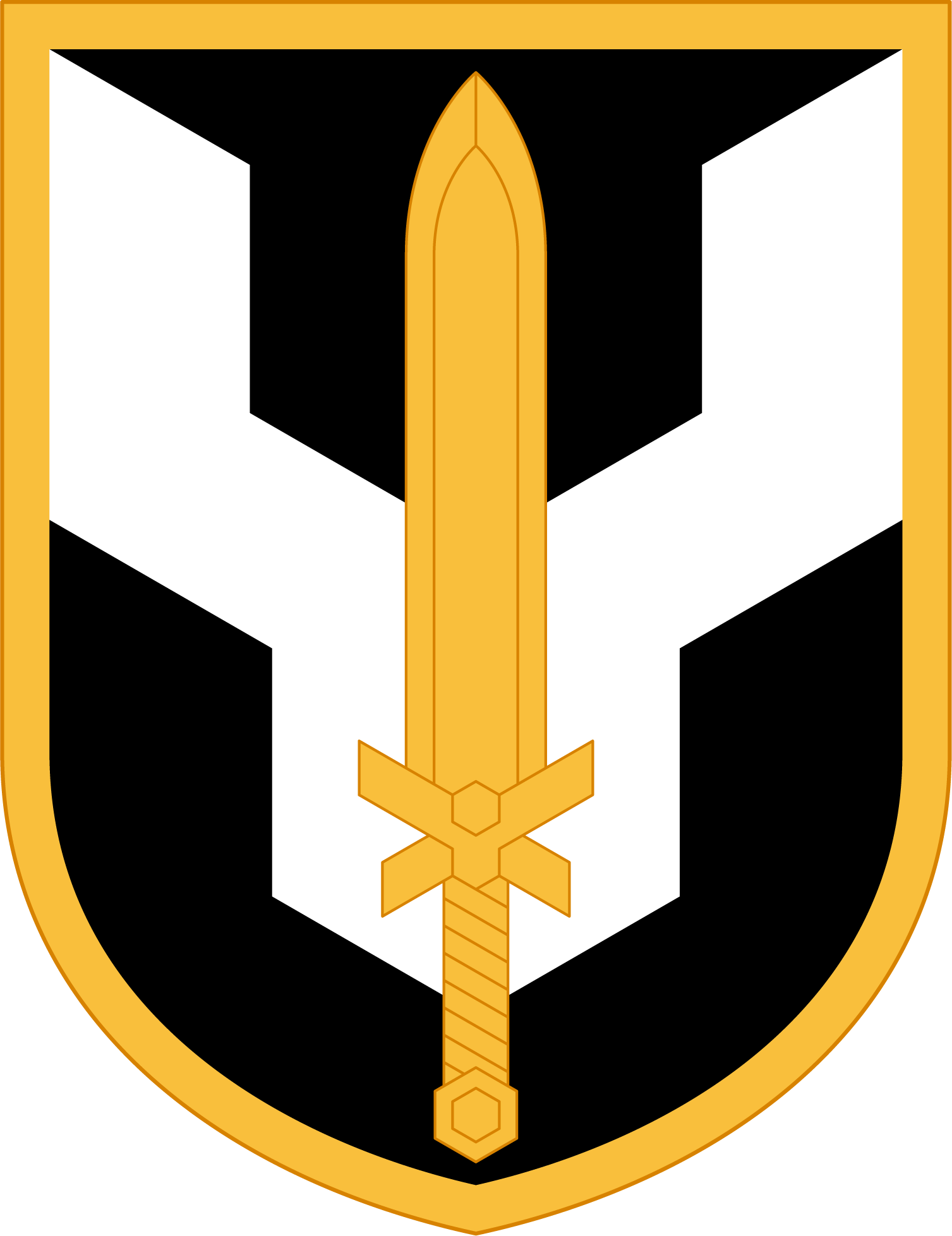
Transformation and Training Command

Western Hemisphere Command

== Cavalry regiments ==
2nd Cavalry Regiment

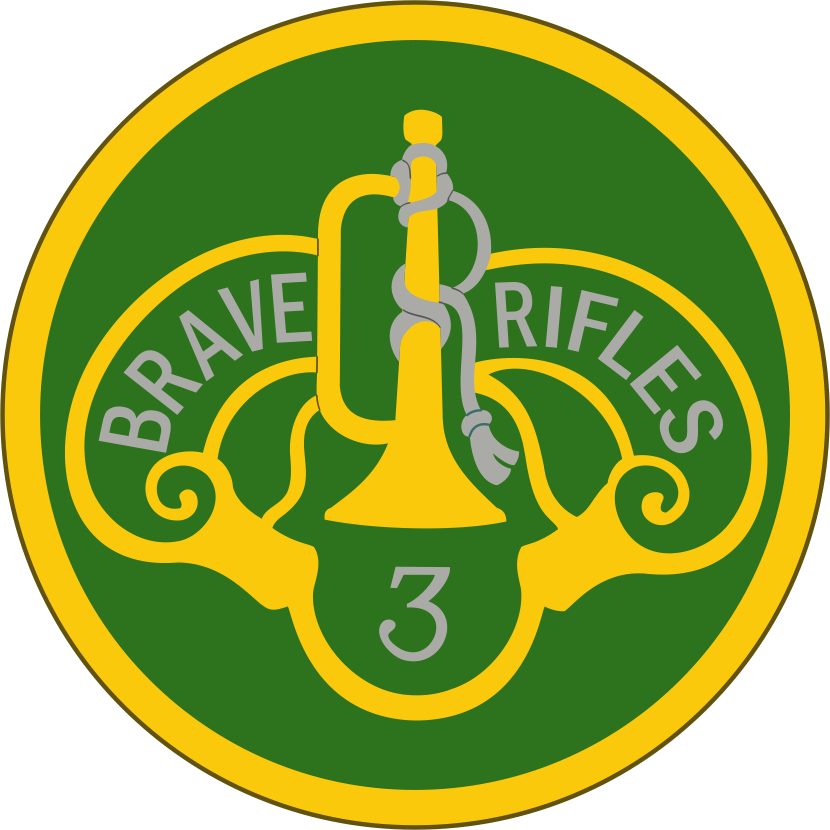
3rd Cavalry Regiment

== Civil affairs commands ==
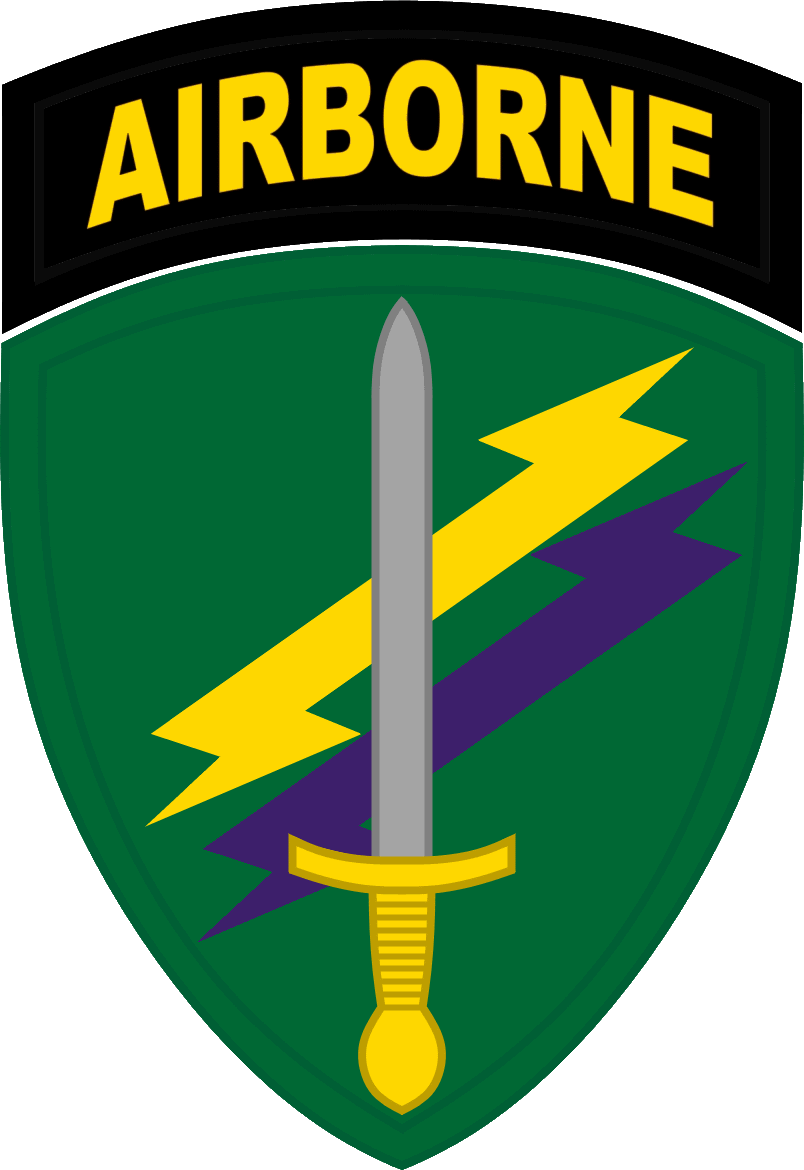
Civil Affairs and Psychological Operations Command

== Explosive ordnance groups ==
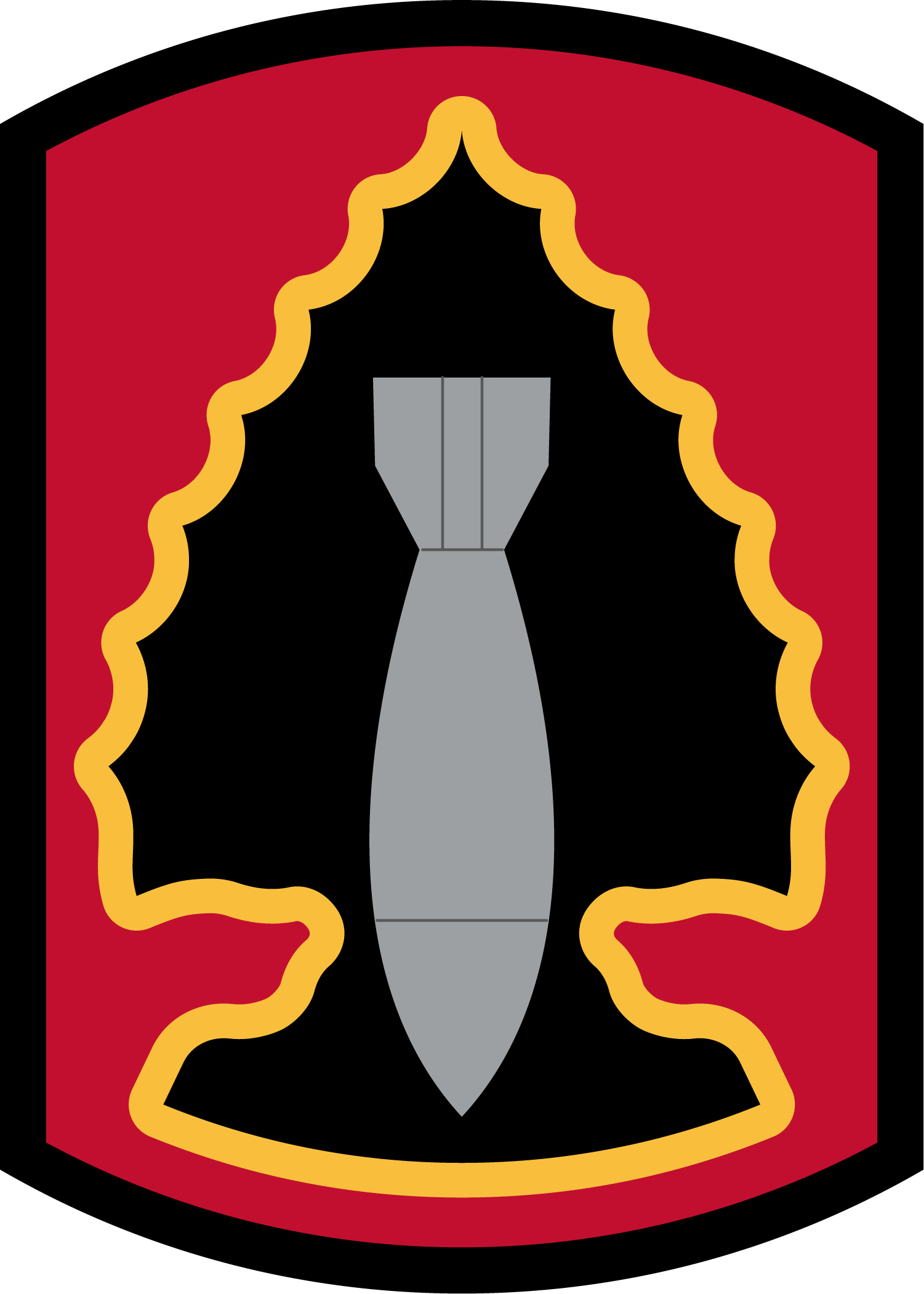
48th Ordnance Group

52nd Ordnance Group

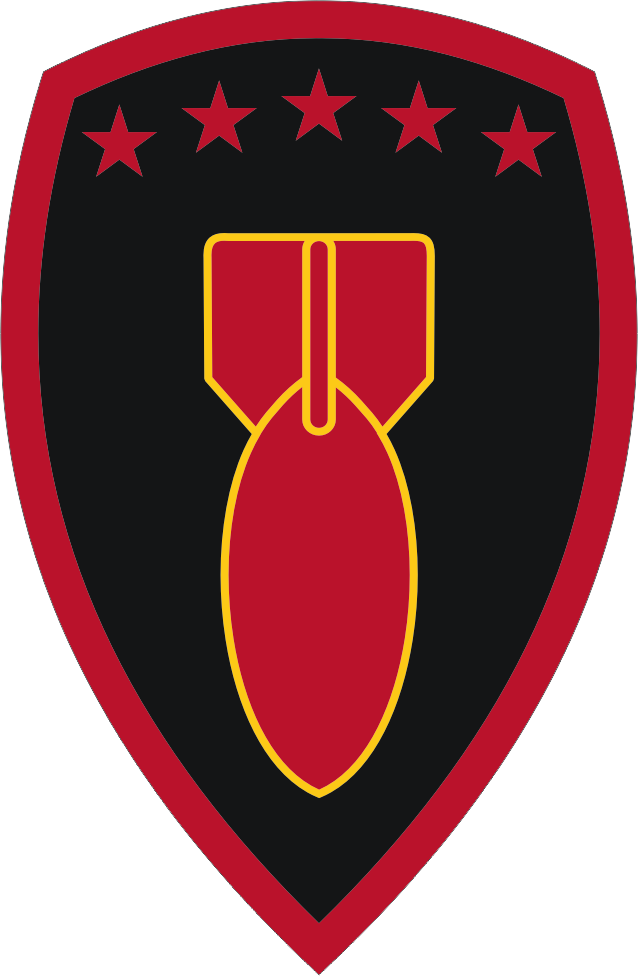
71st Ordnance Group

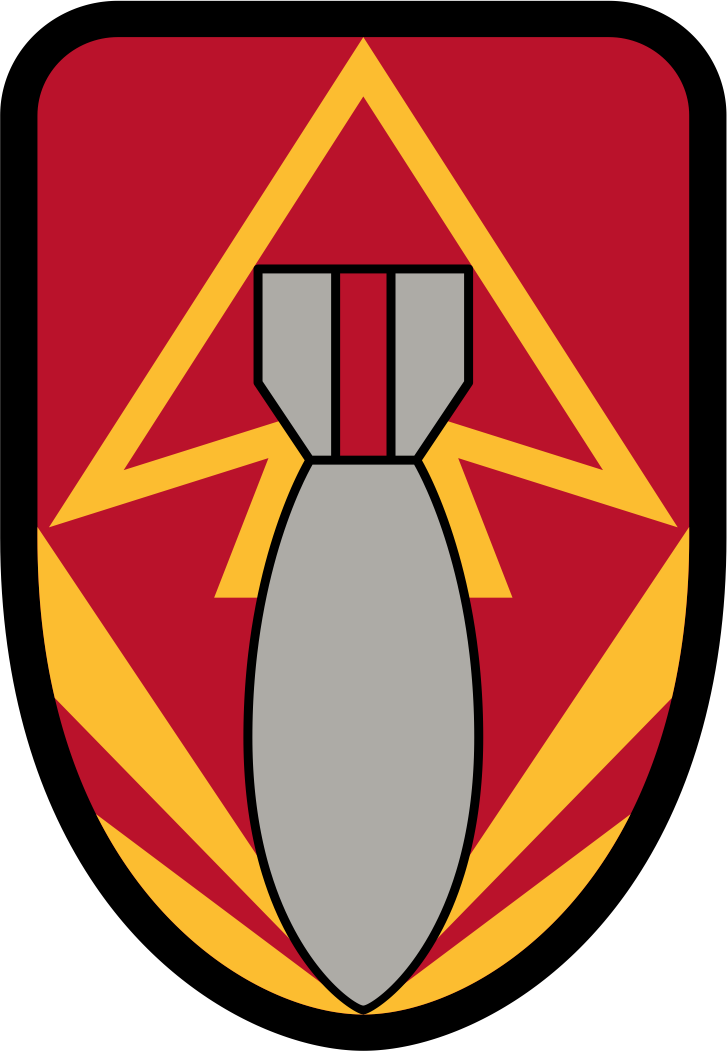
111th Explosive Ordnance Group

== Military intelligence groups ==
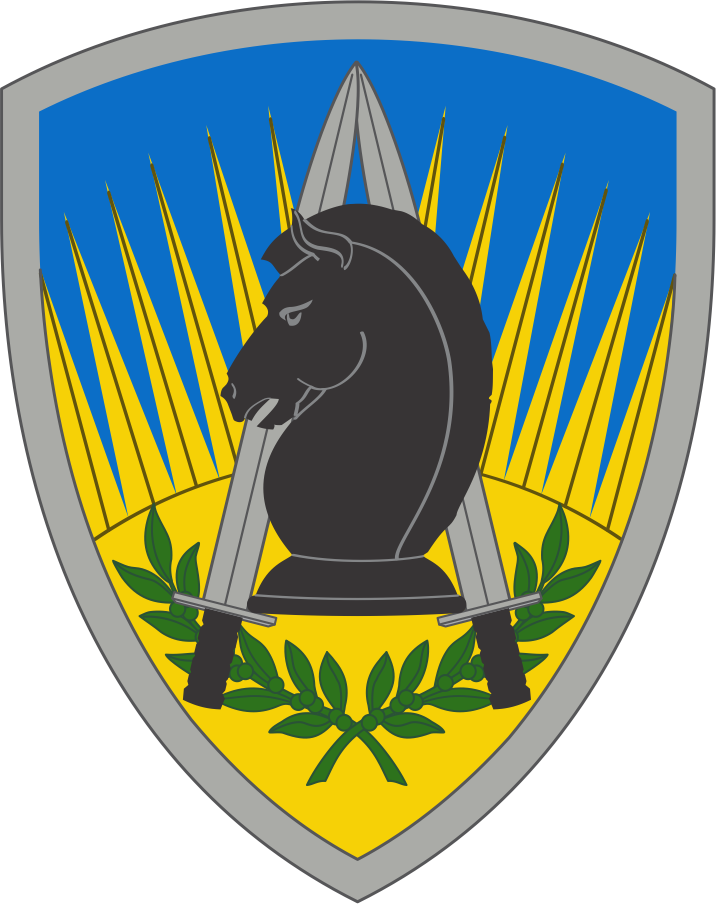
650th Military Intelligence Group

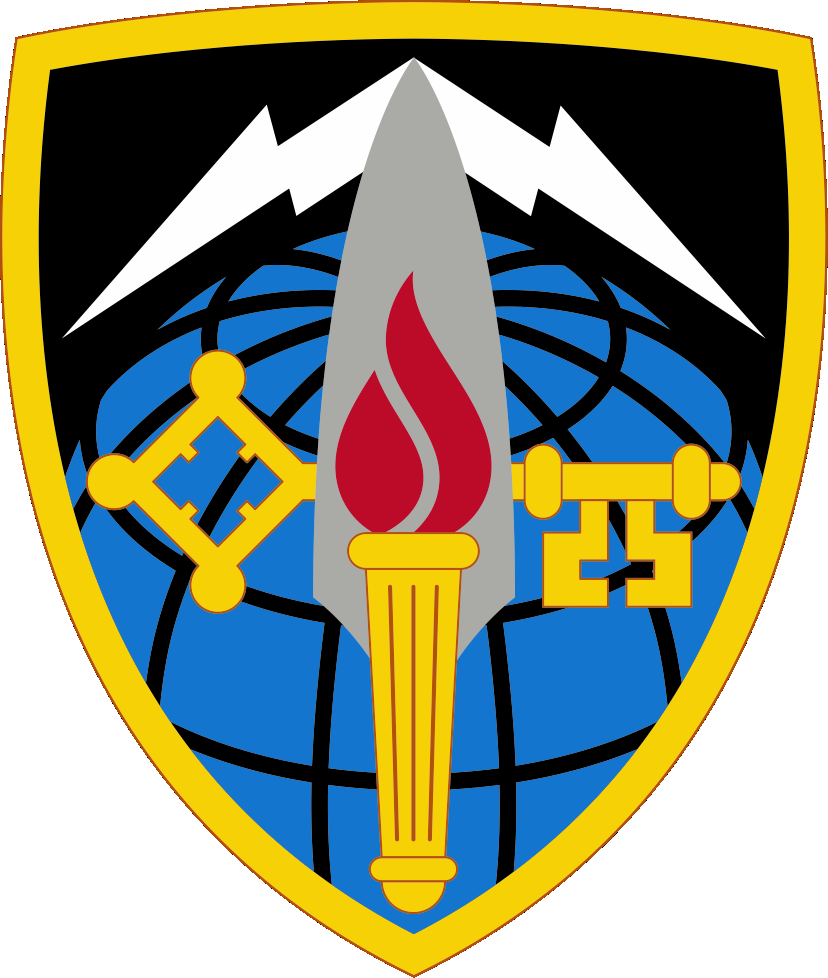
706th Military Intelligence Group

== Multi-domain task forces ==
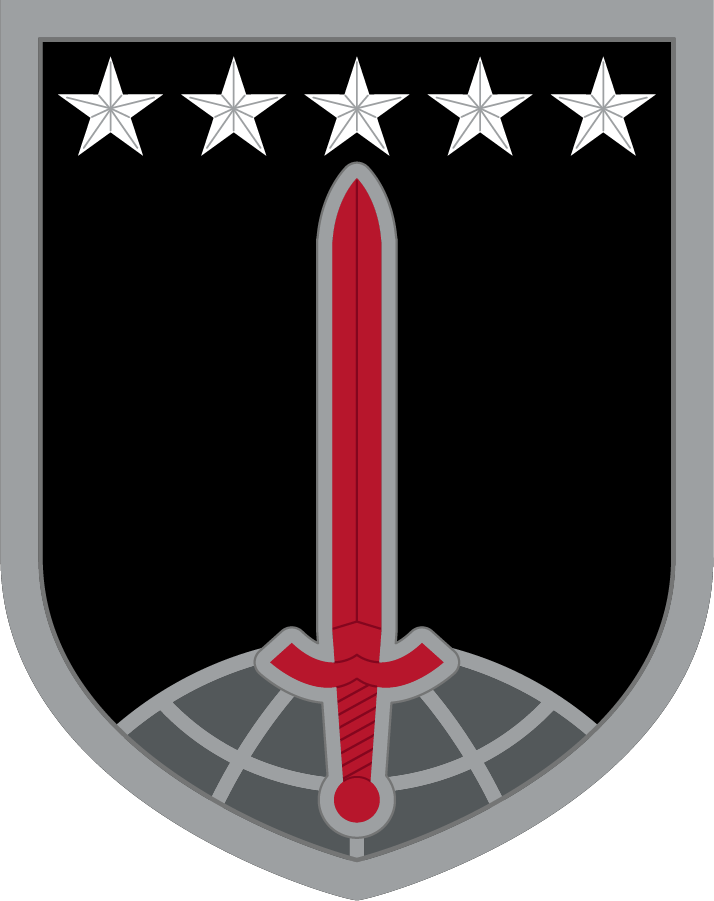
1st Multi-Domain Task Force

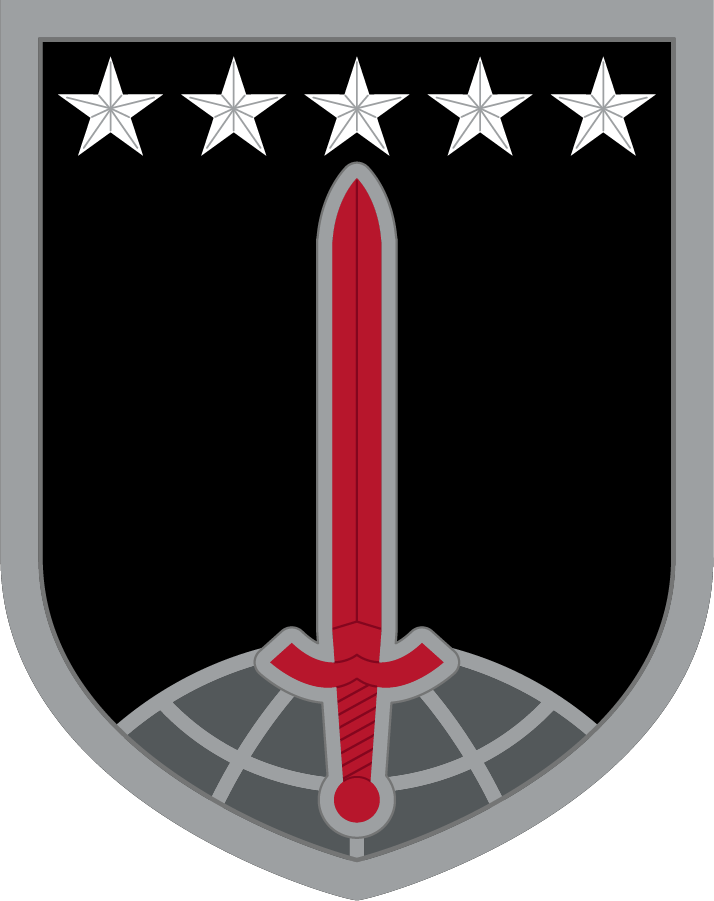
2nd Multi-Domain Task Force

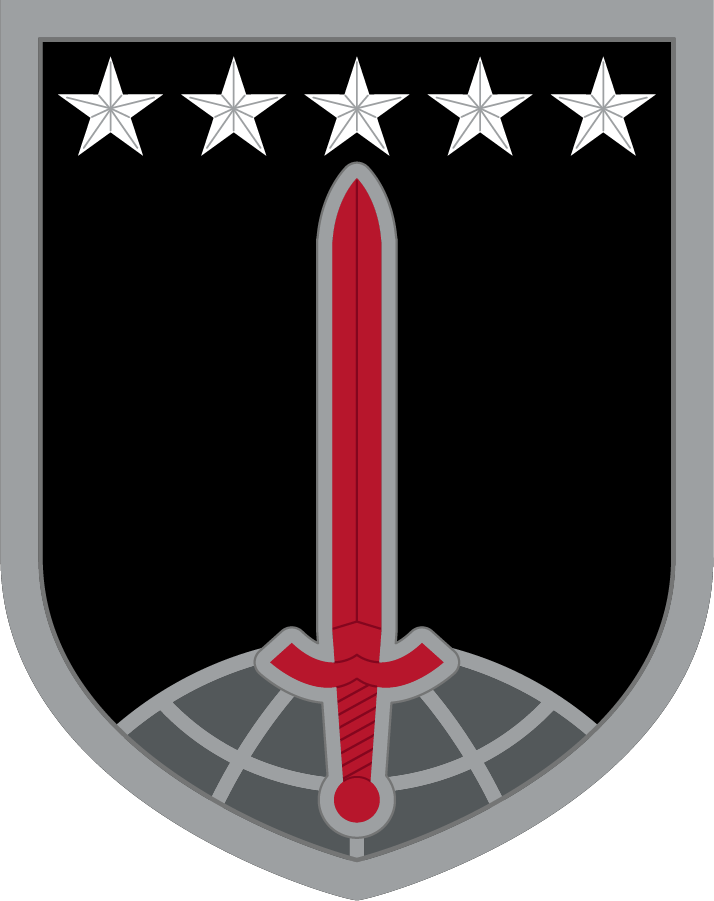
3rd Multi-Domain Task Force

== Regional support groups ==
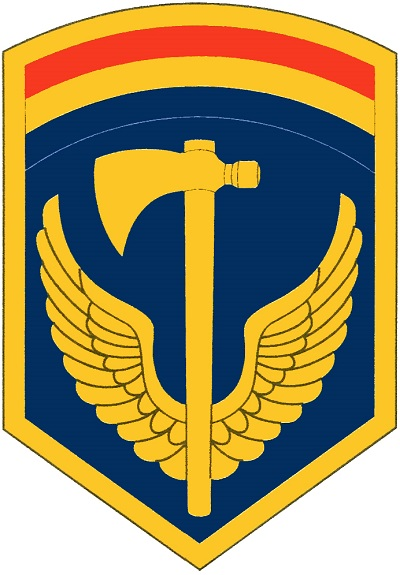
42nd Regional Support Group

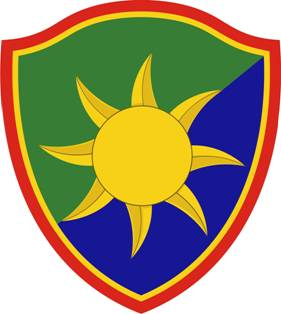
50th Regional Support Group

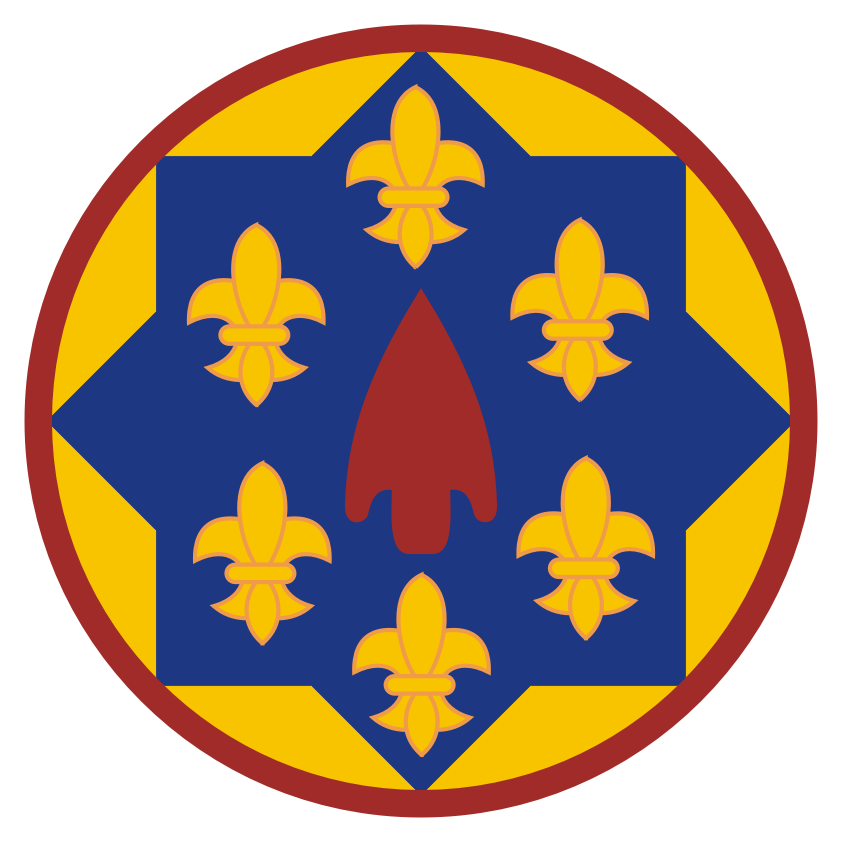
115th Regional Support Group

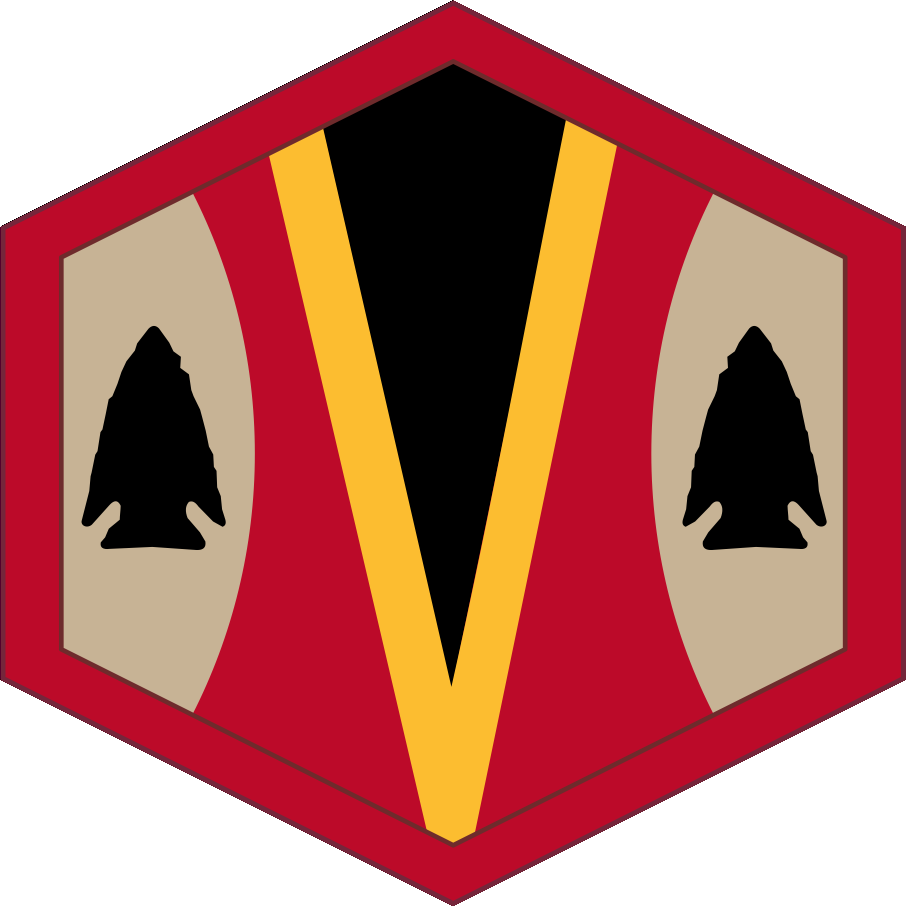
151st Regional Support Group

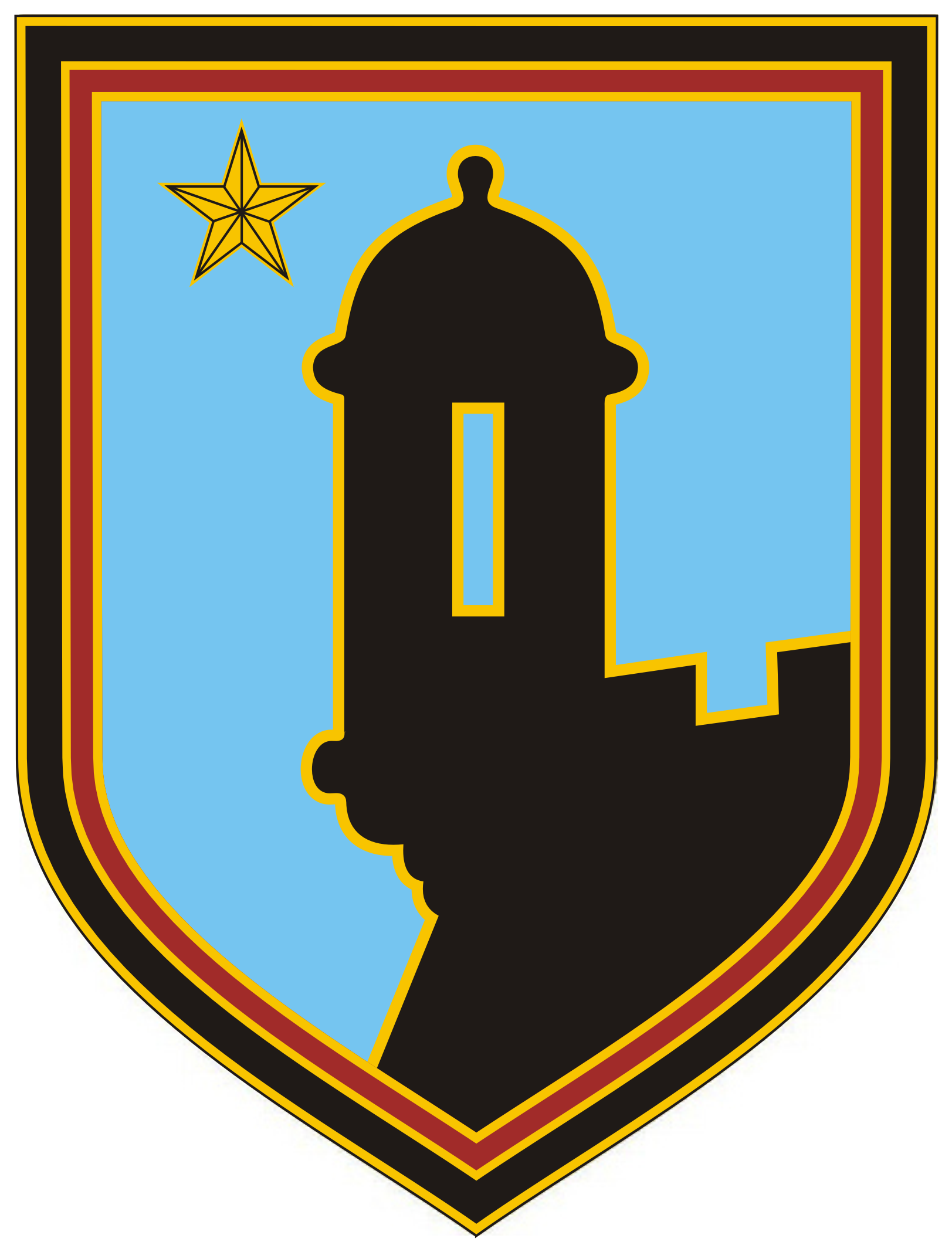
191st Regional Support Group

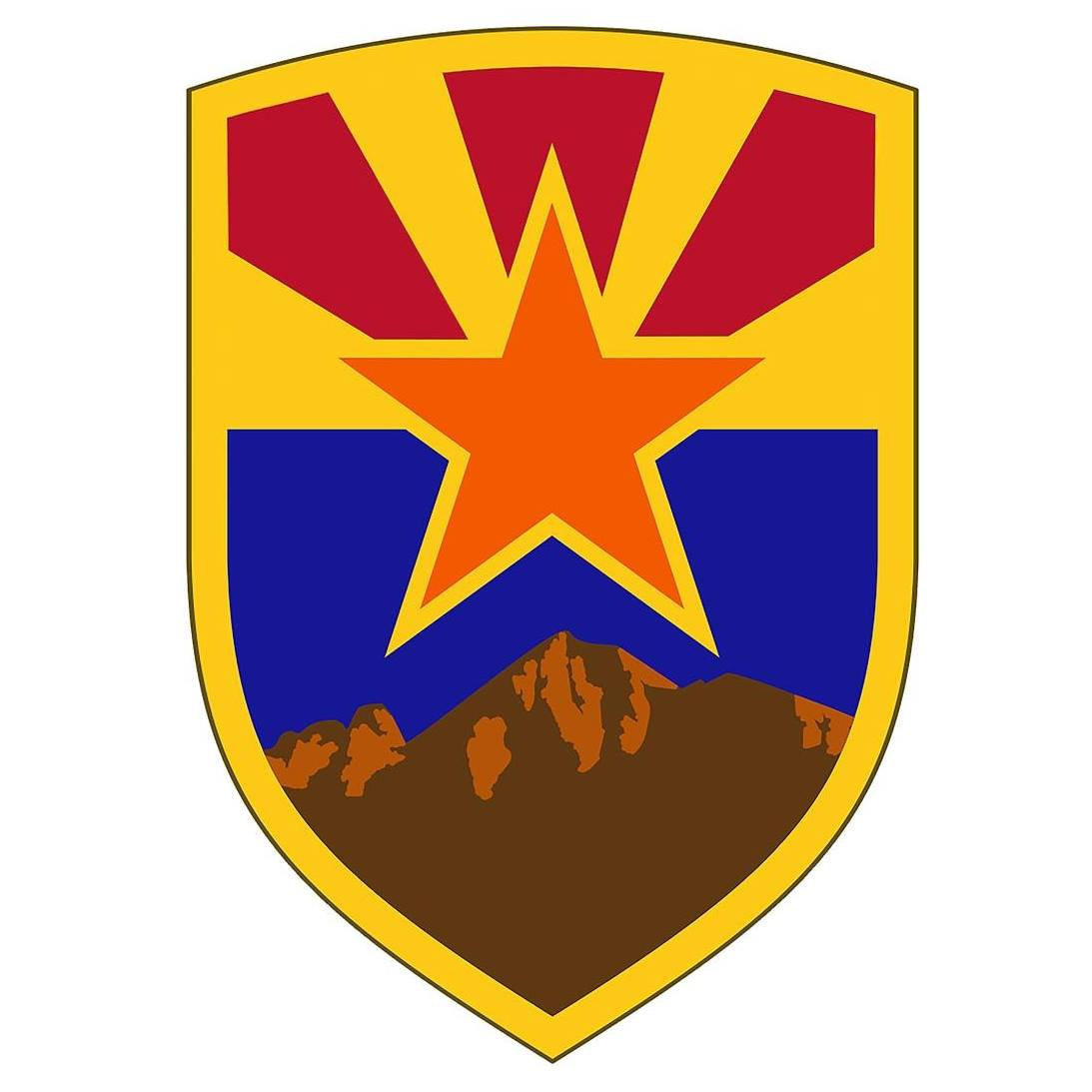
198th Regional Support Group

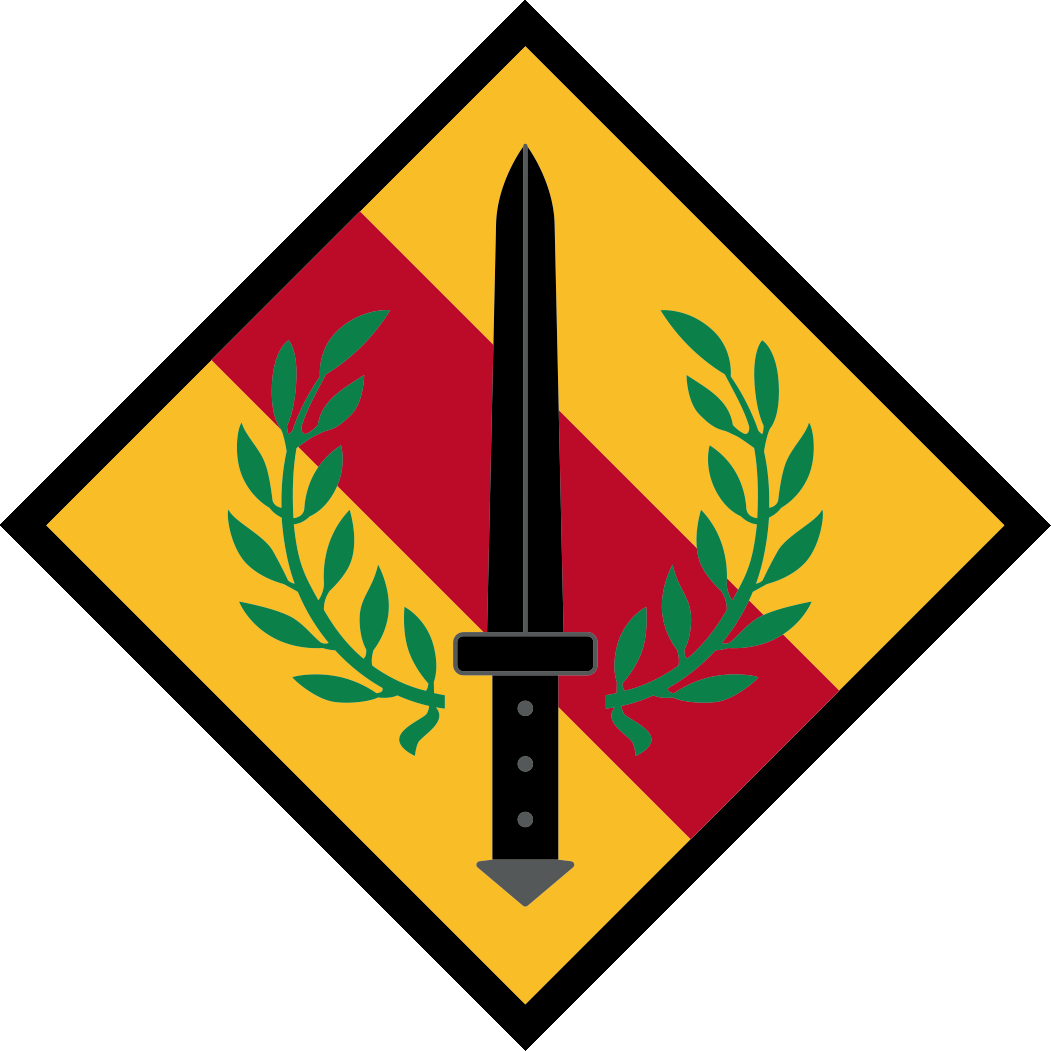
201st Regional Support Group

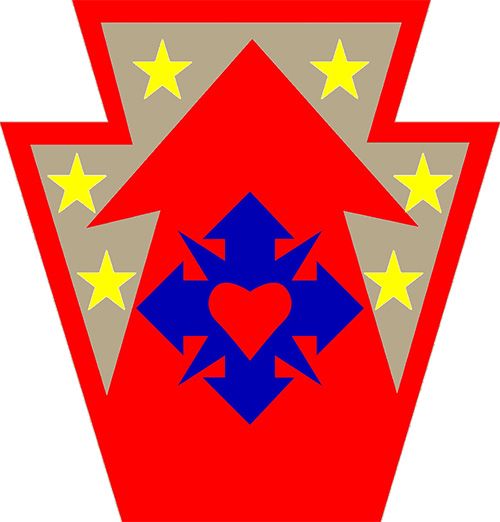
213th Regional Support Group

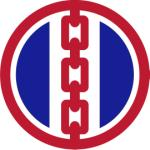
301st Regional Support Group

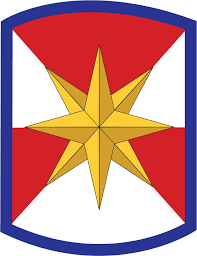
347th Regional Support Group

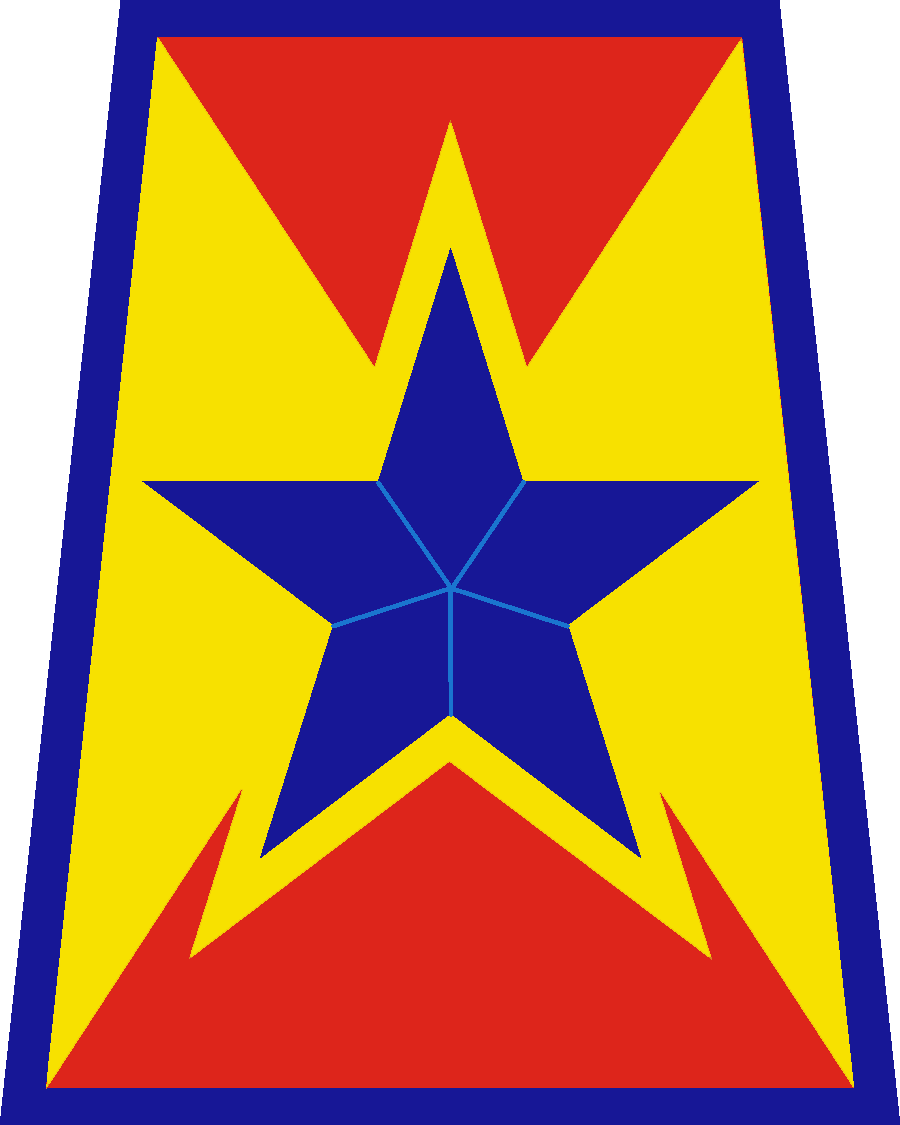
635th Regional Support Group

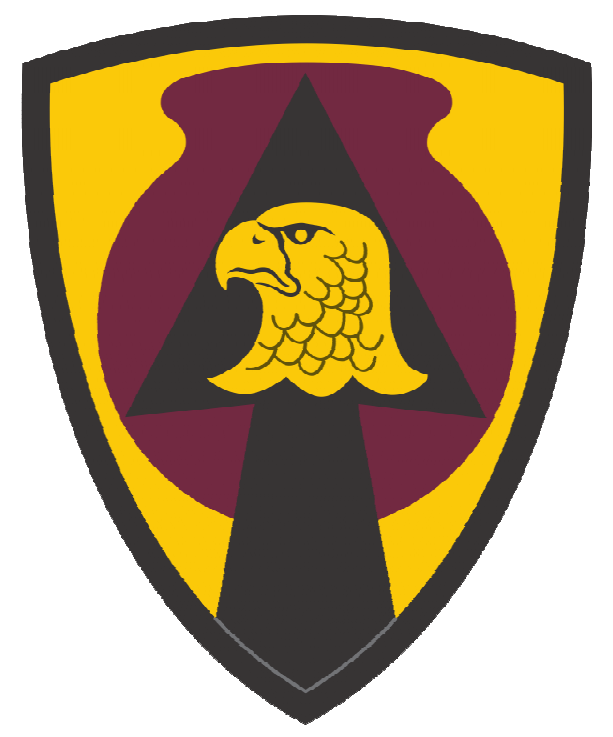
734th Regional Support Group

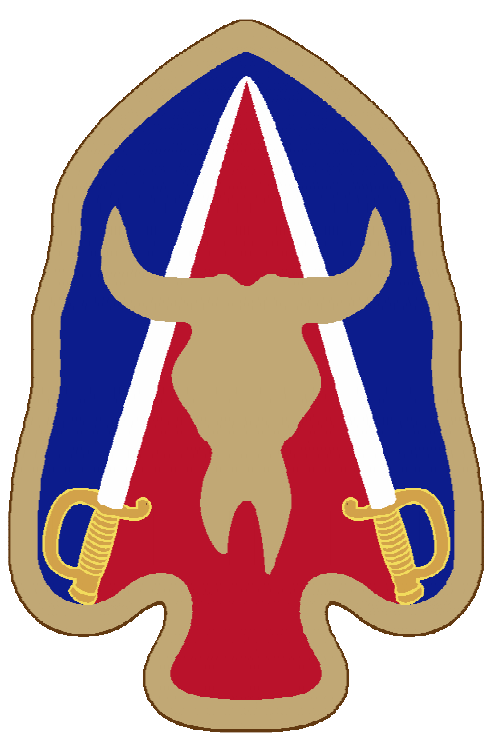
1889th Regional Support Group

== Schools and centers of excellence ==
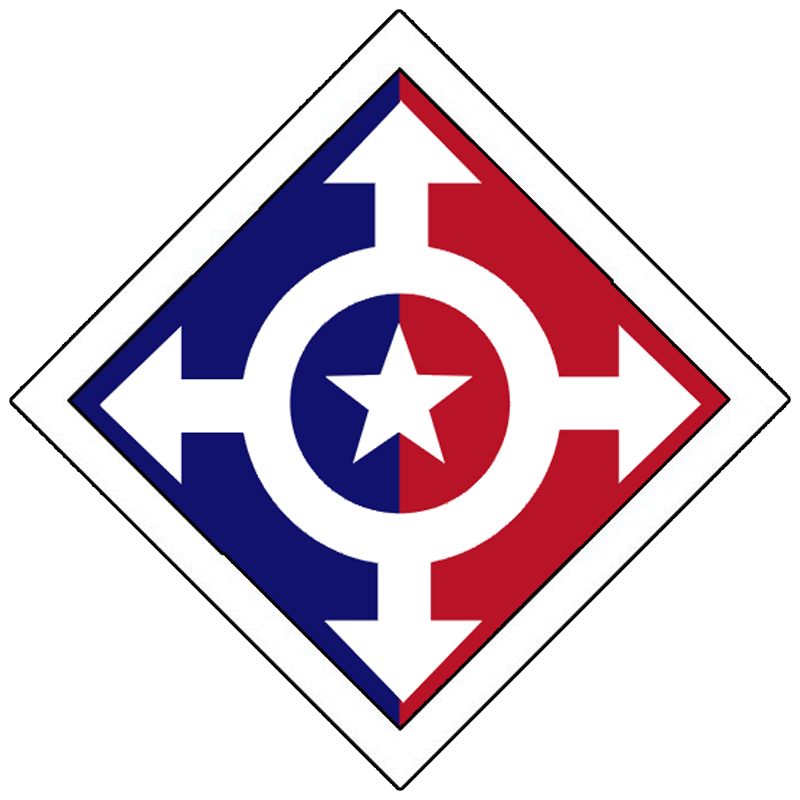
Adjutant General School

Air Defense Artillery Center & School

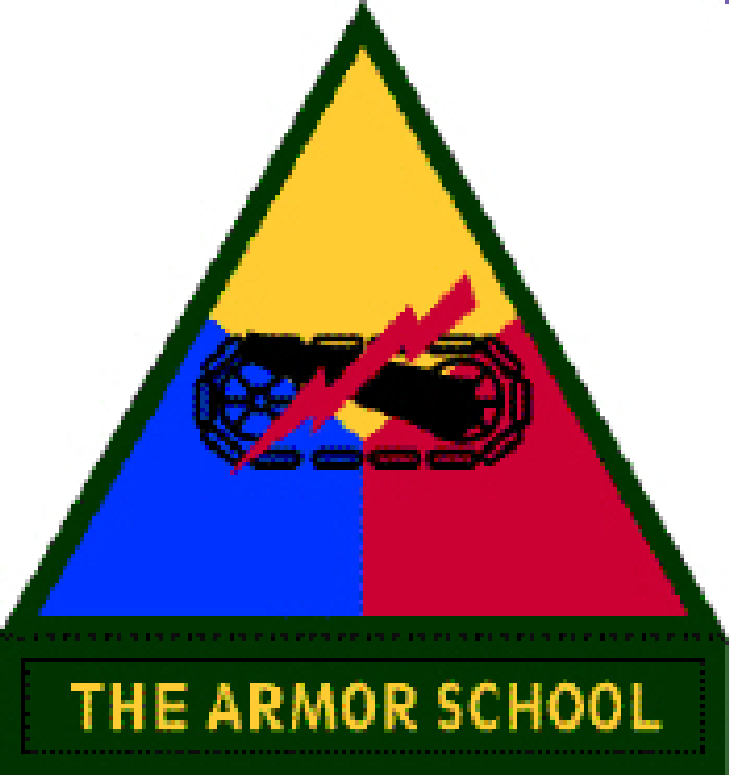
The Armor School

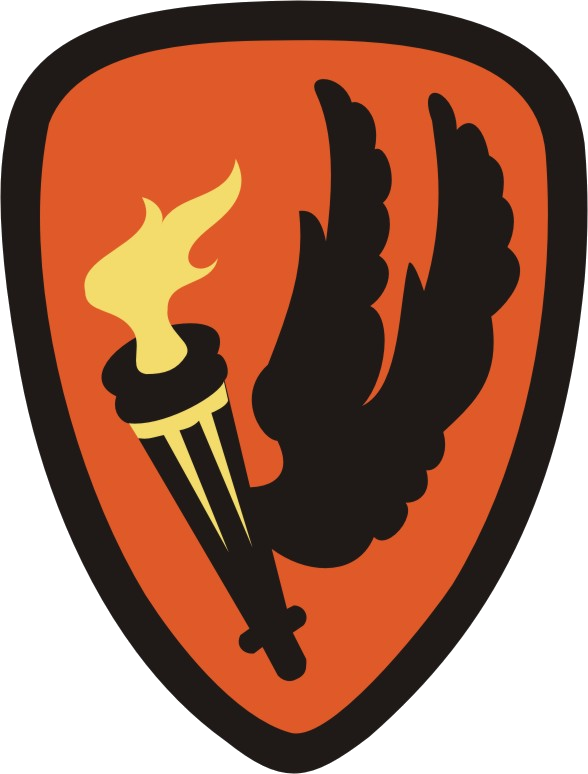
Aviation Center of Excellence

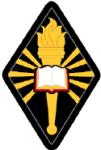
Institute for Religious Leadership Formerly Army Chaplains Center and School

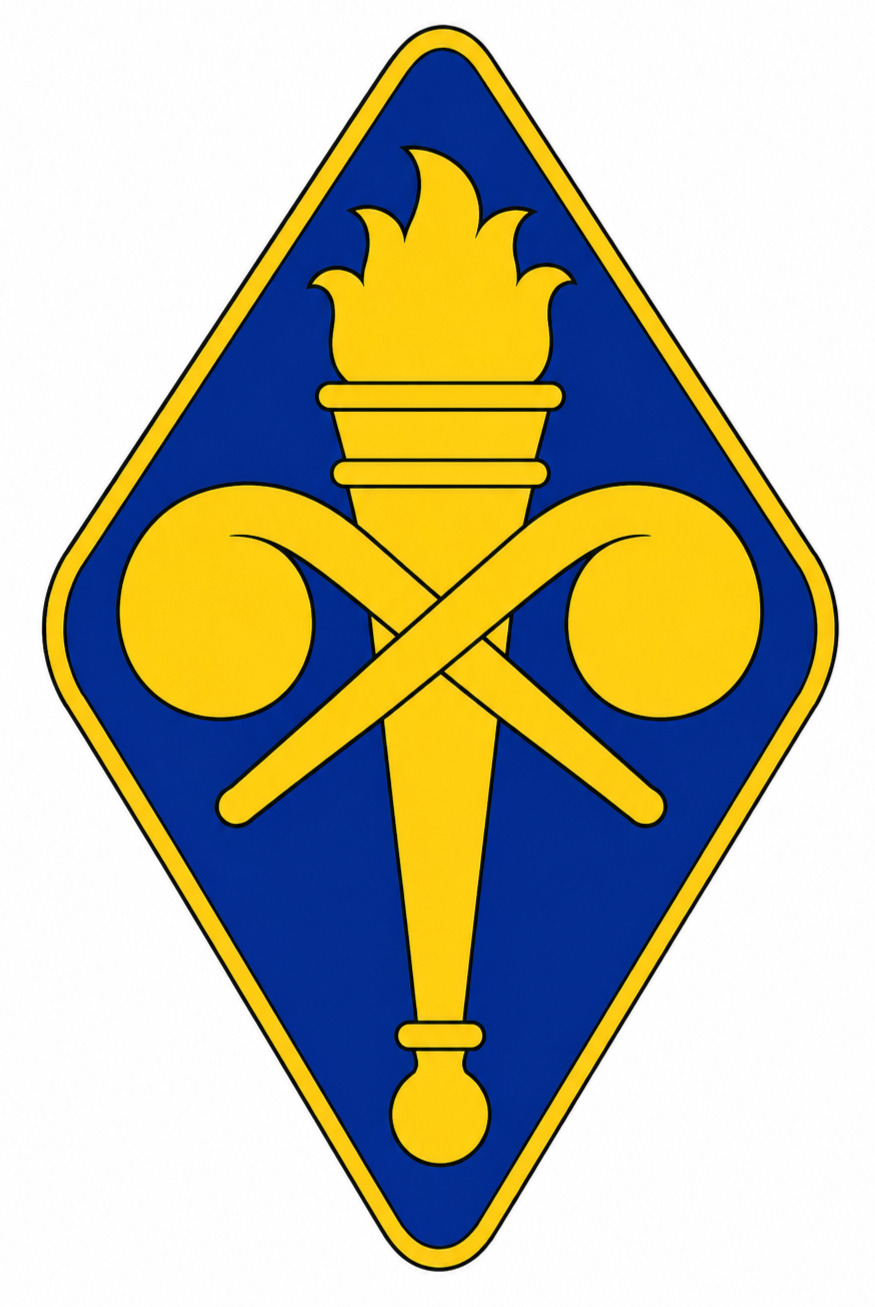
CBRN School and Training Center

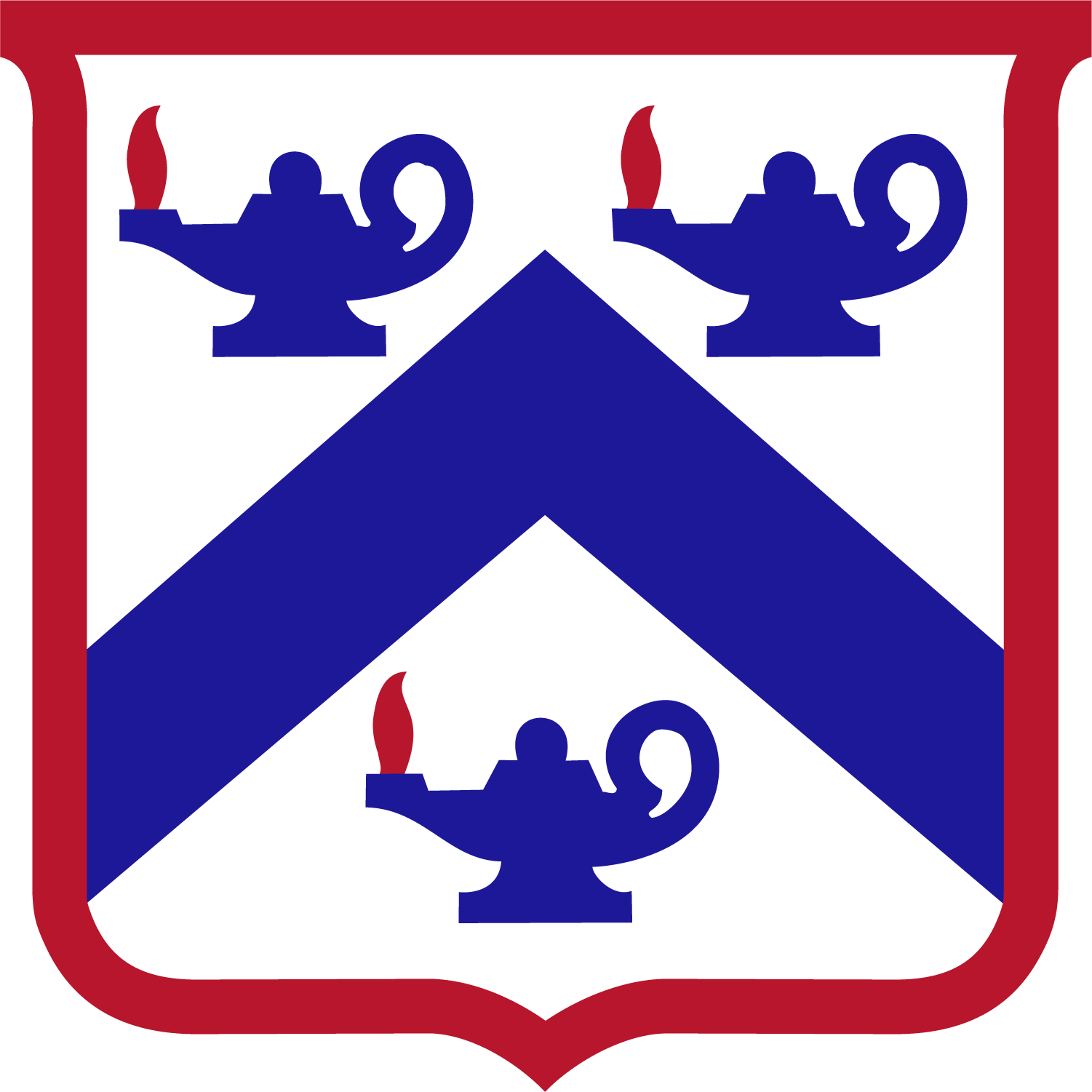
Command and General Staff College

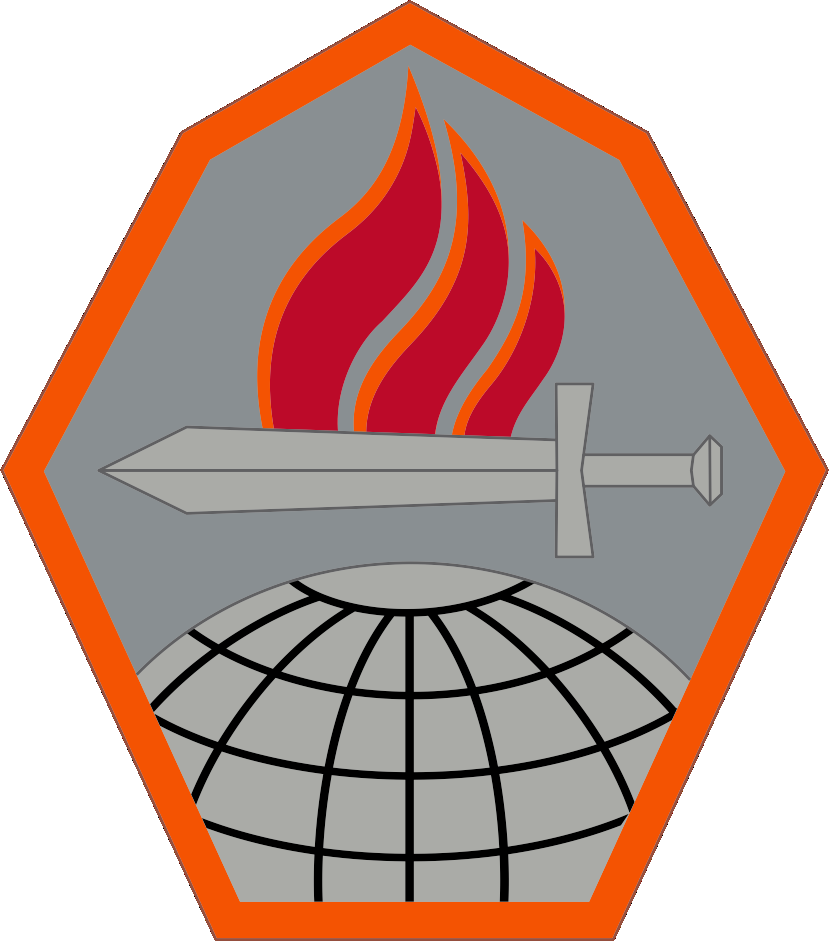
Cyber Center of Excellence

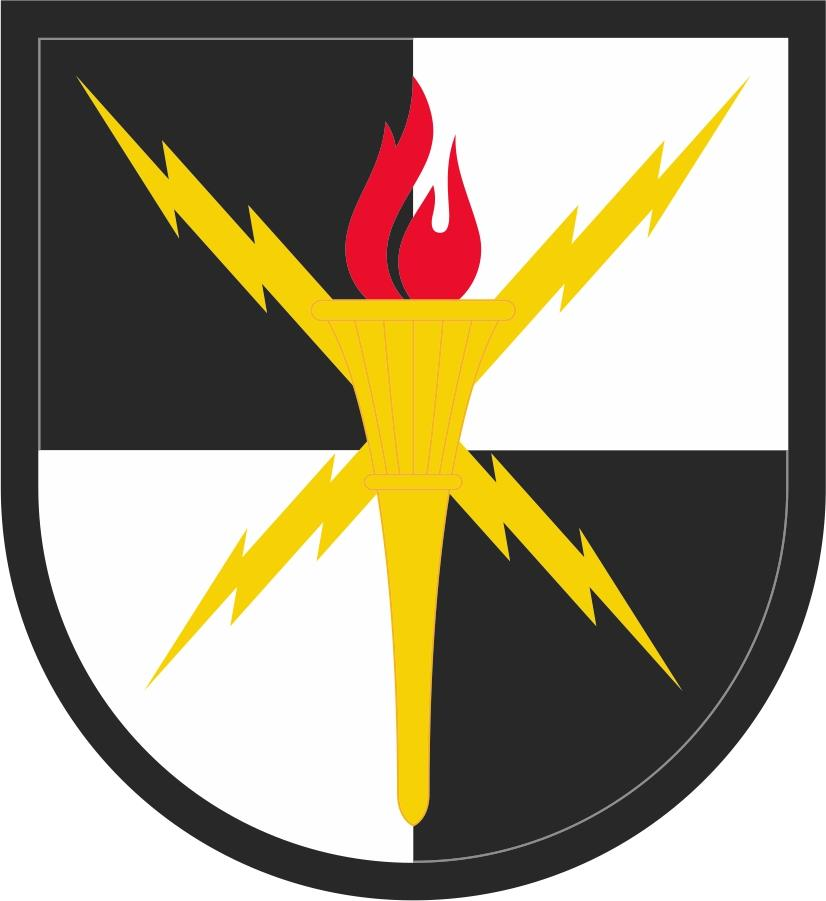
Cyber School

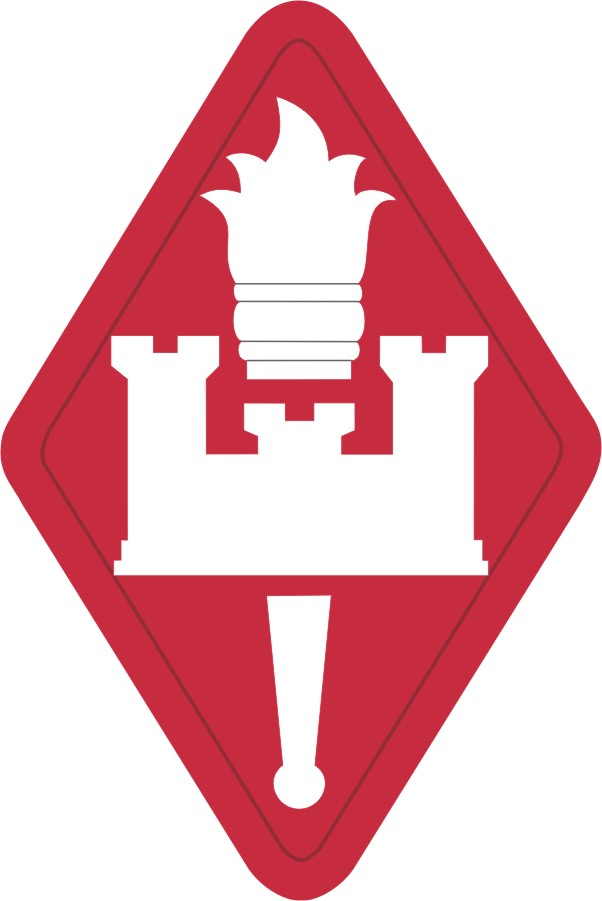
Army Engineer Center USACE Learning Center

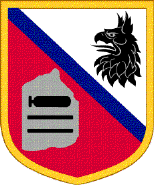
Defense Language Institute

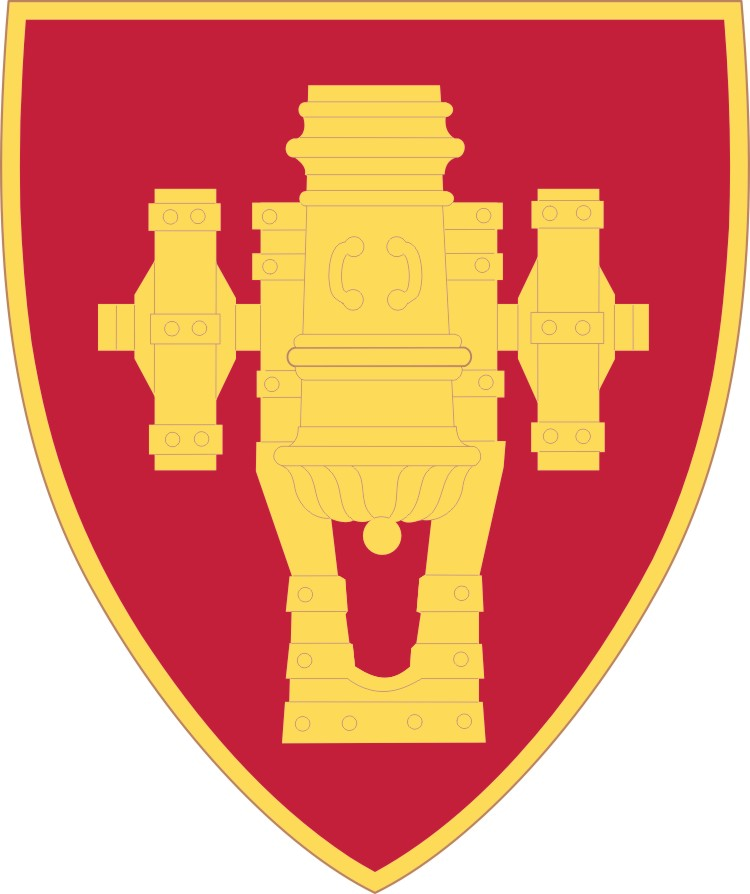
Field Artillery School

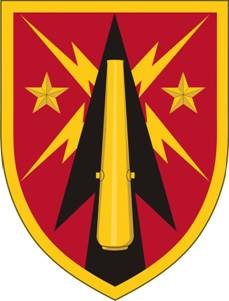
Fires Center of Excellence Fort Sill

Infantry School

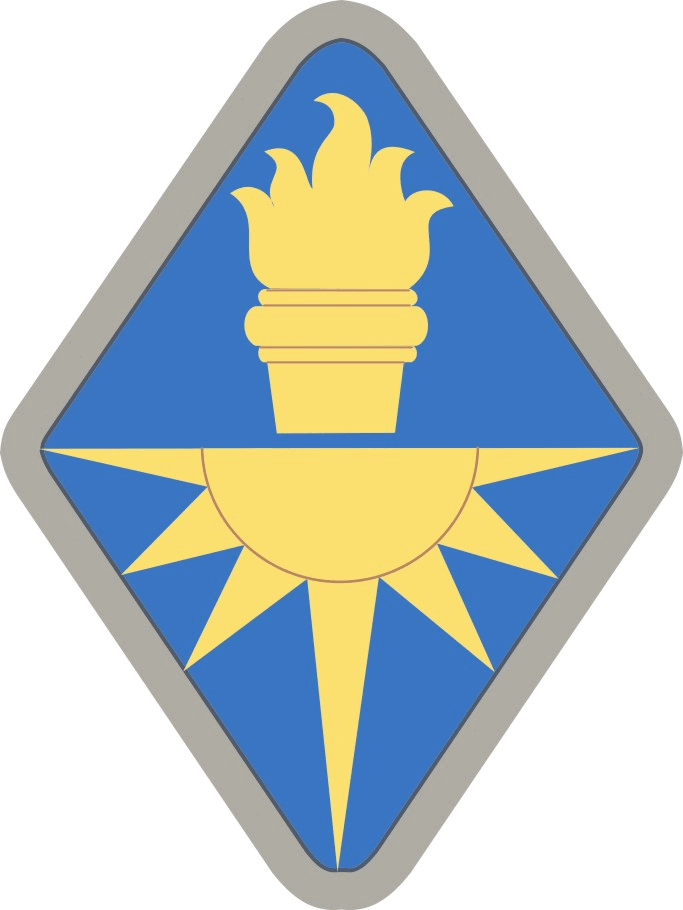
Intelligence Center of Excellence

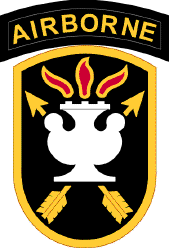
John F Kennedy Special Warfare Center and School

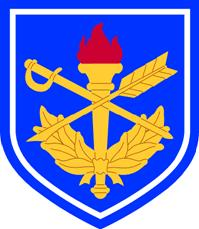
Judge Advocate General School

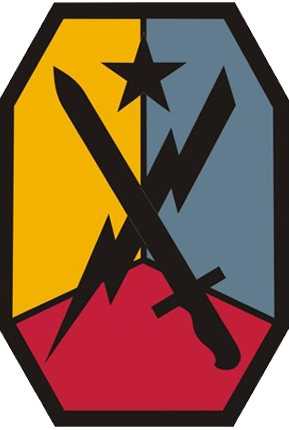
Maneuver Center of Excellence

Maneuver Support Center of Excellence

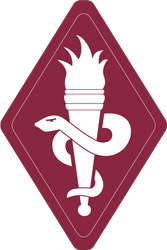
Medical Center of Excellence

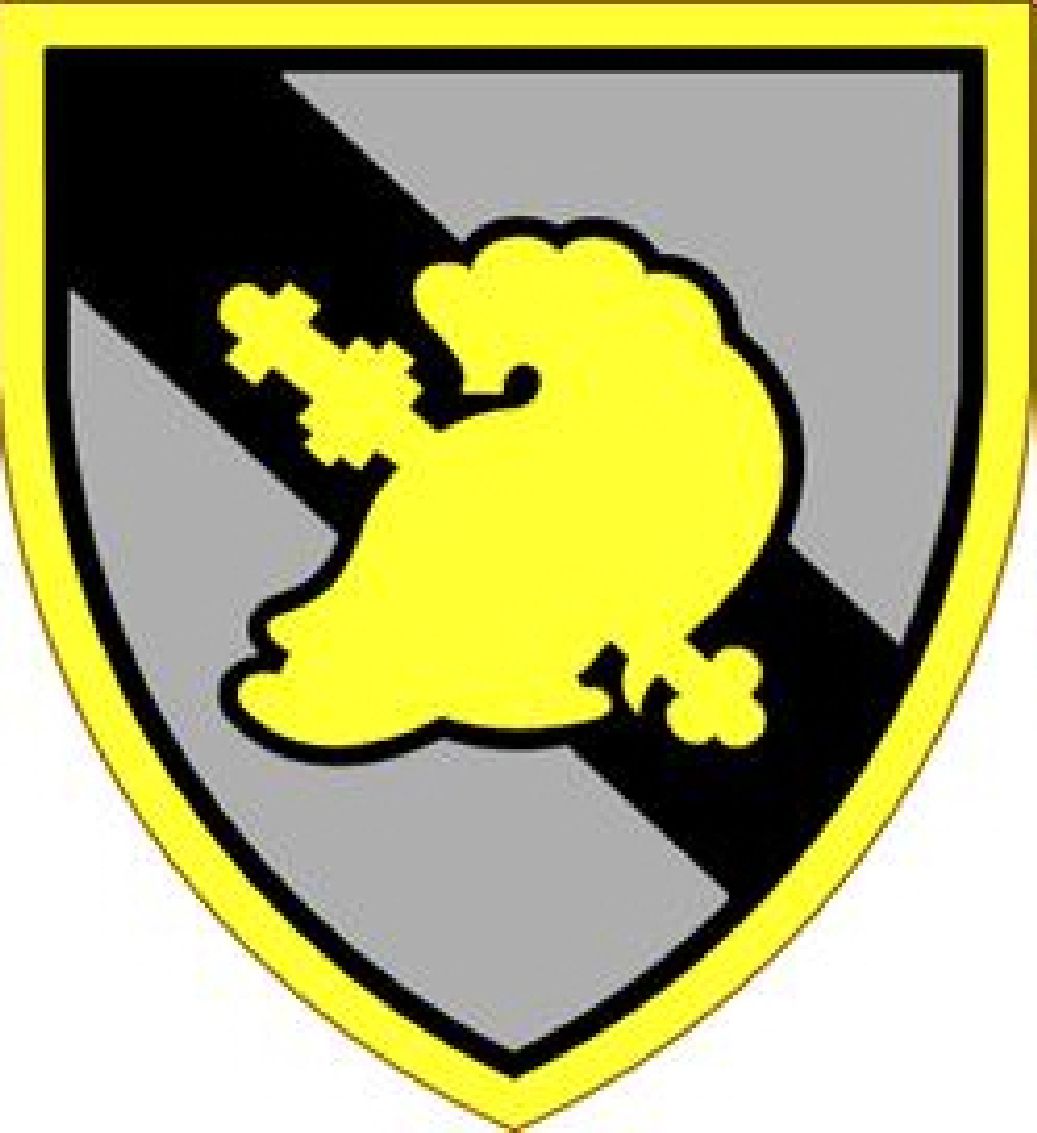
USMA West Point

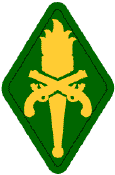
Military Police School

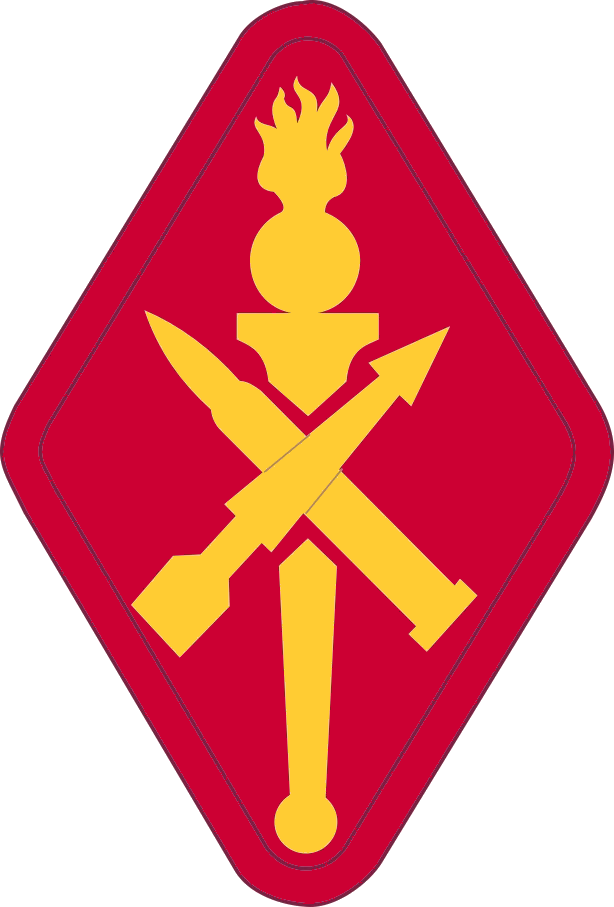
Ordnance Munitions and Electronic Maintenance School

Officer Candidate School

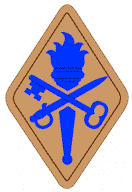
Quartermaster Center and School

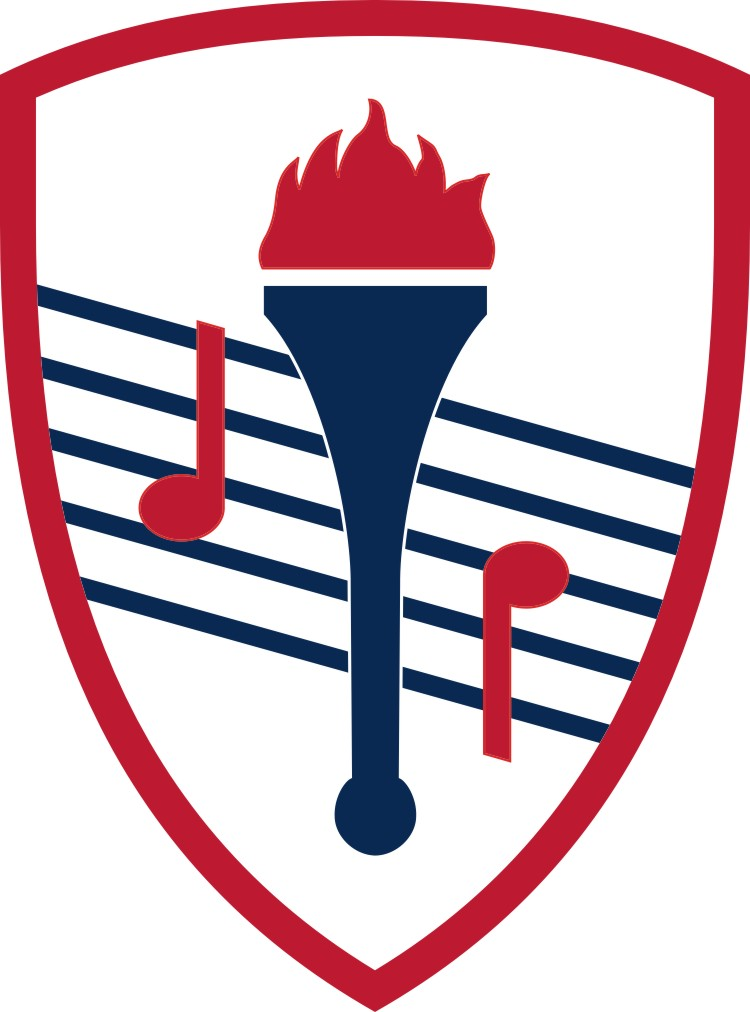
Army School of Music

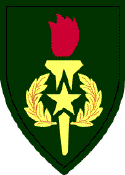
Sergeants Major Academy

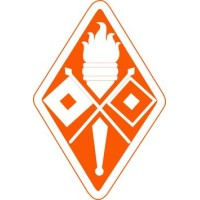
Army Signal School

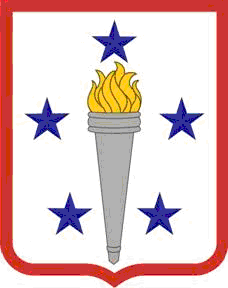
Sustainment Center of Excellence

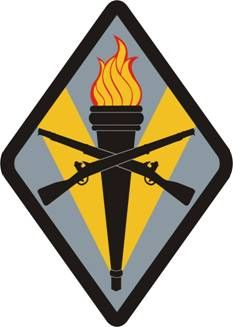
Army Training Center Fort Jackson

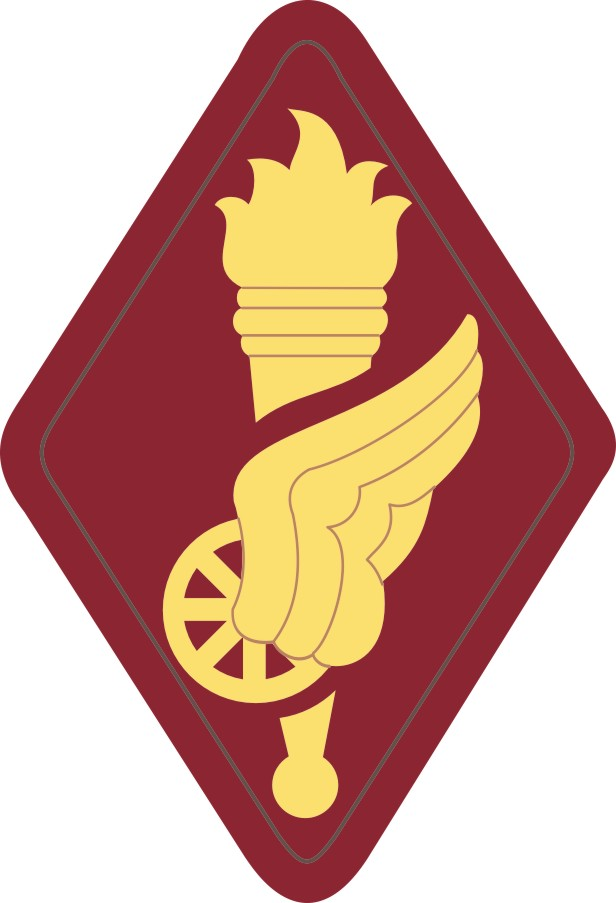
Transportation Center and School

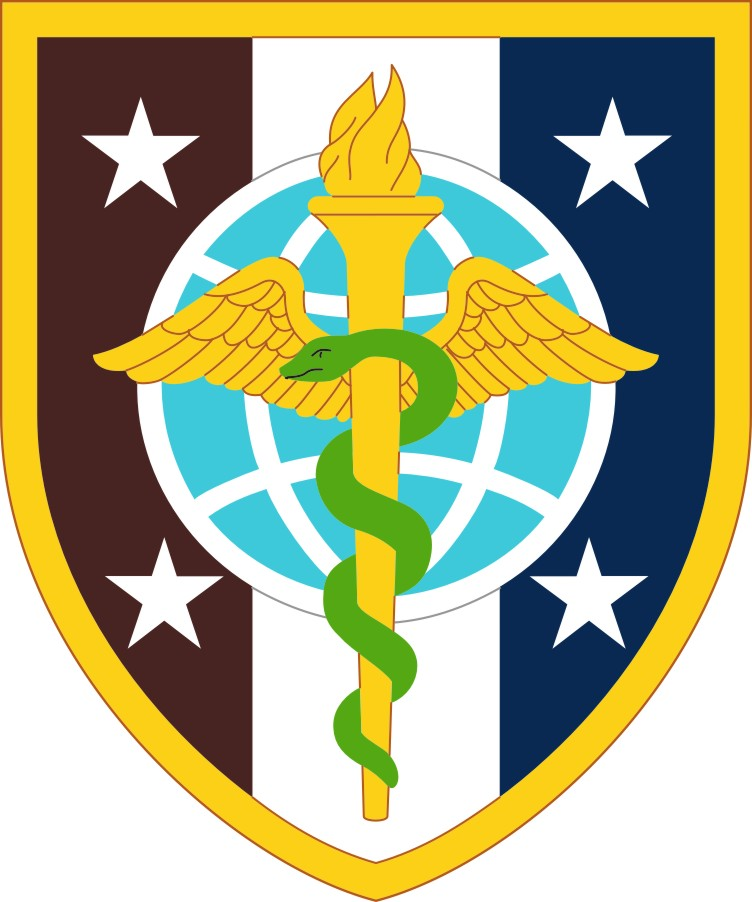
Uniformed Services University of the Health Sciences

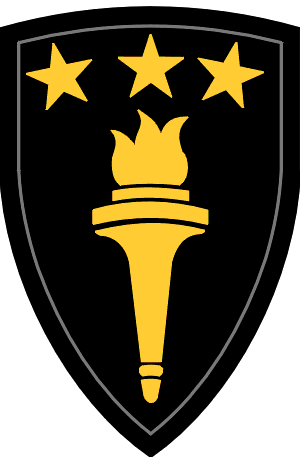
War College

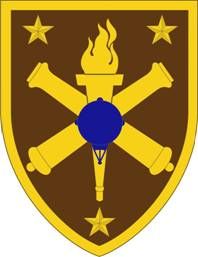
Warrant Officer Candidate School

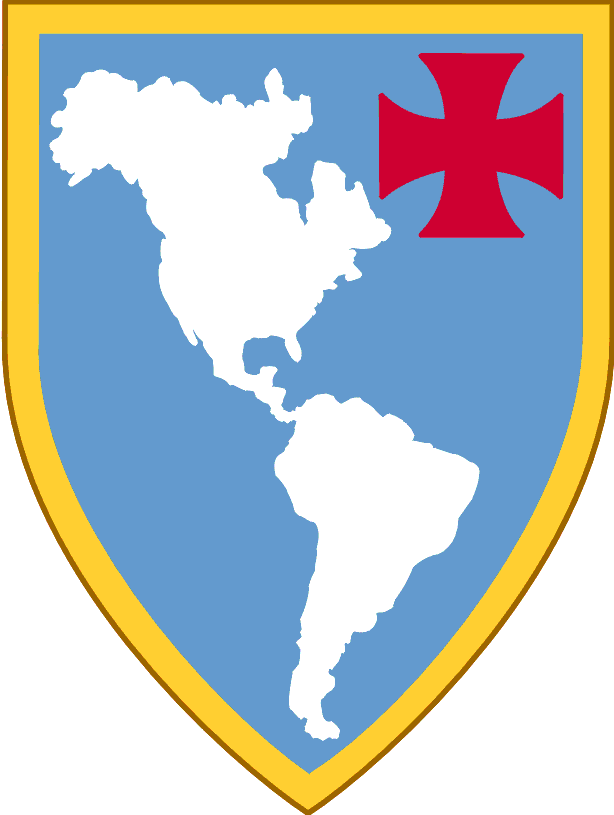
Western Hemisphere Institute for Security Cooperation

== Special operations units ==
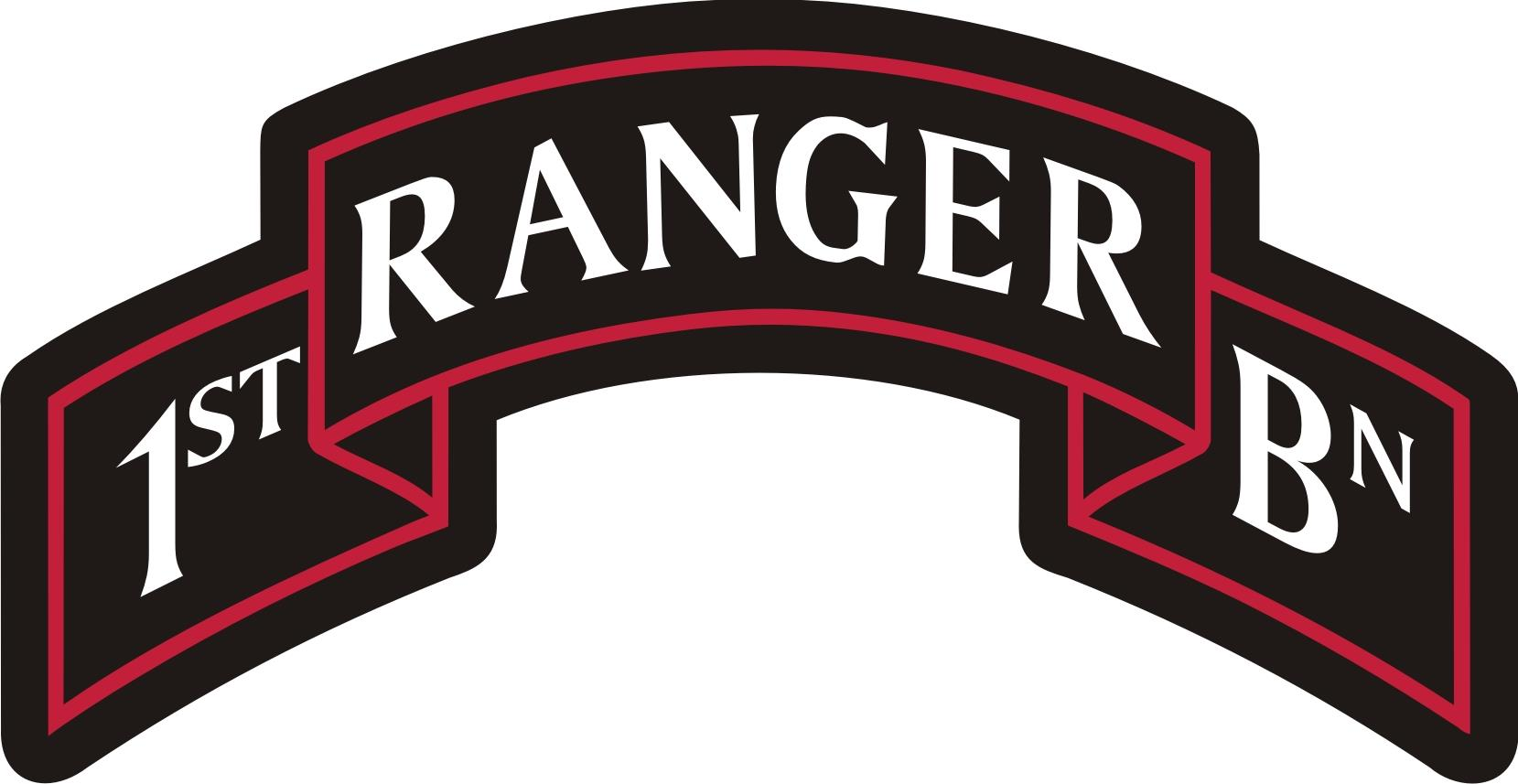
1st Ranger Battalion

2nd Ranger Battalion

3rd Ranger Battalion

75th Ranger Regiment

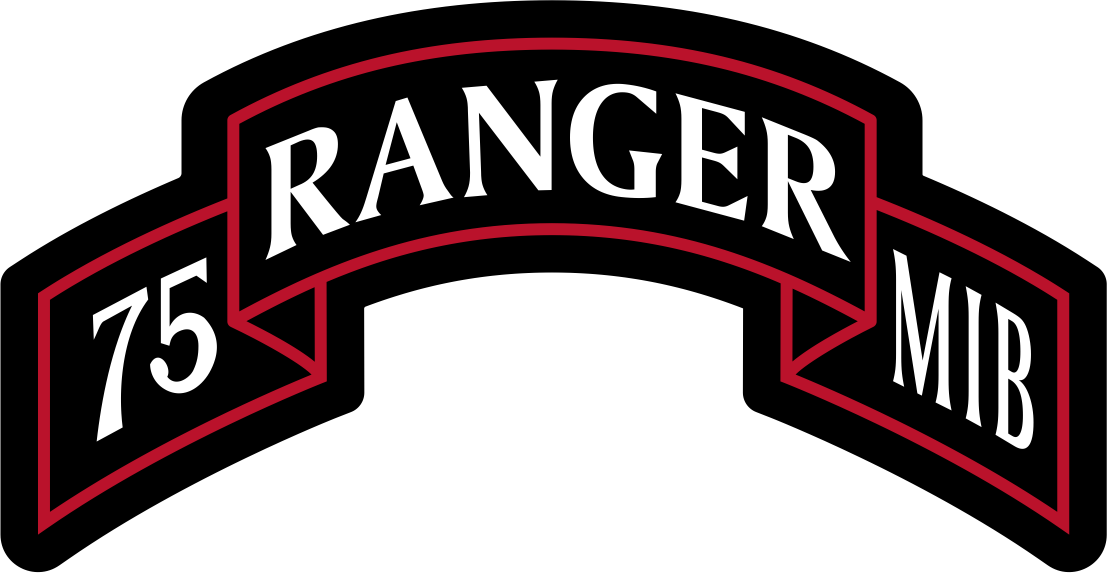
75th Ranger Regimental Military Intelligence Battalion

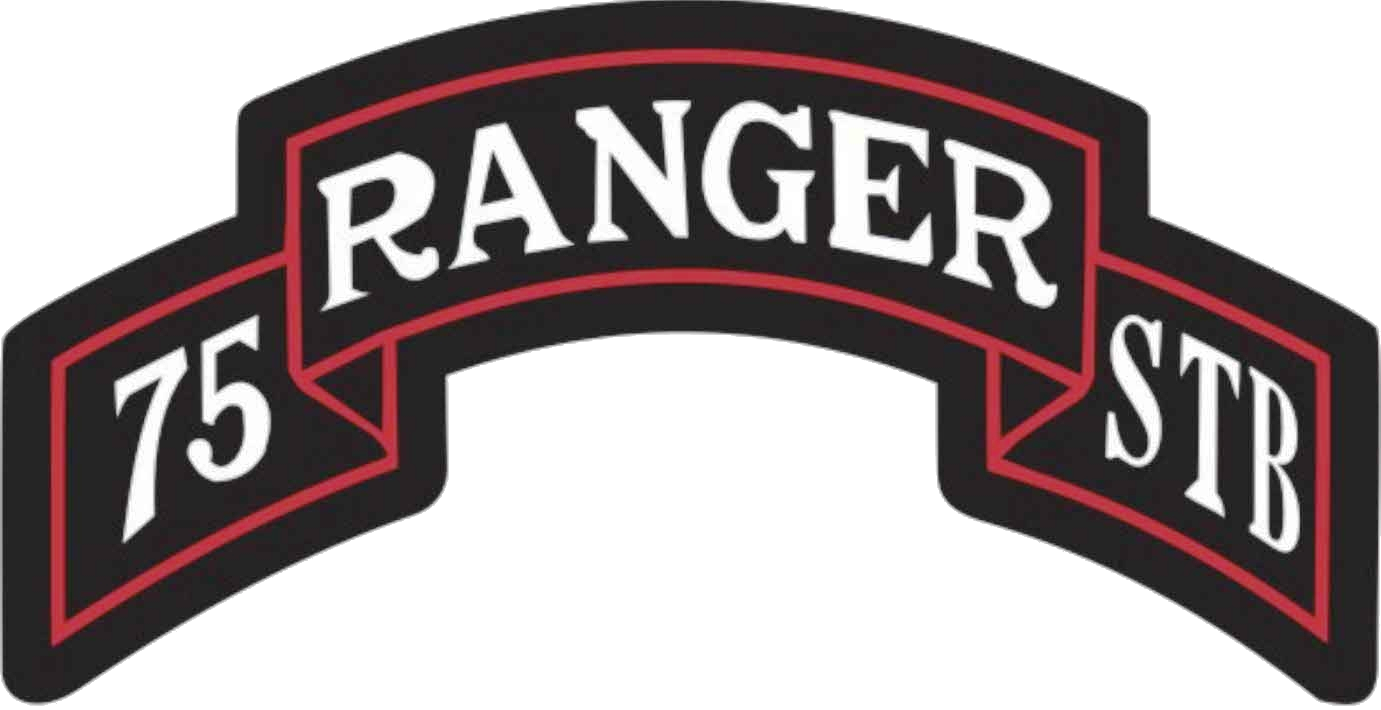
75th Ranger Regimental Special Troops Battalion

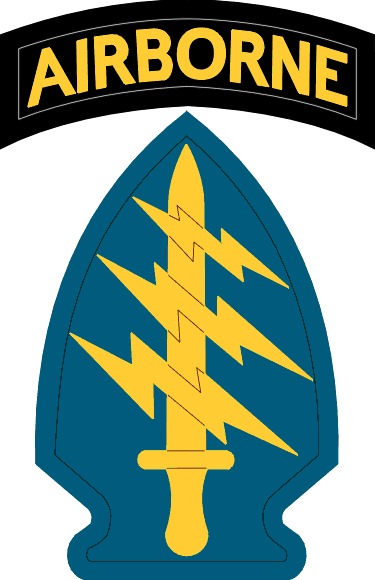
1st Special Forces Command (Airborne)

Special Operations Command

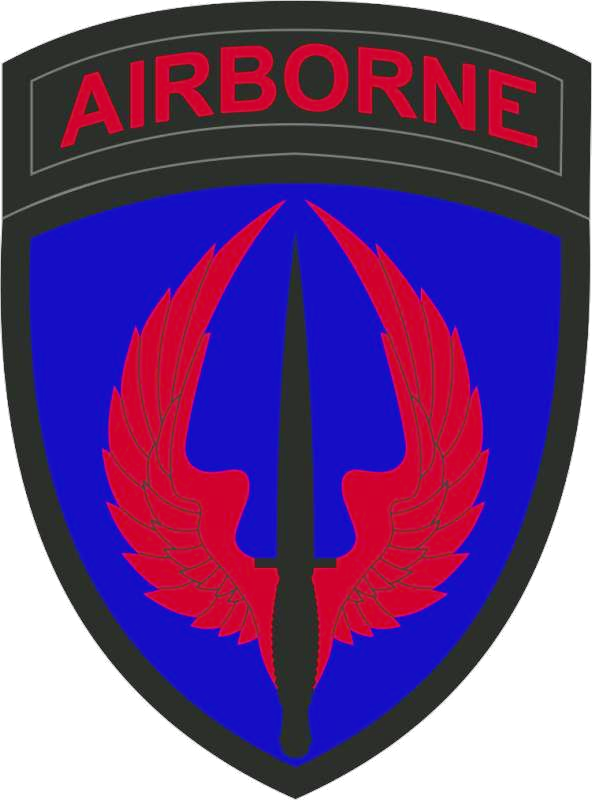
Special Operations Aviation Command

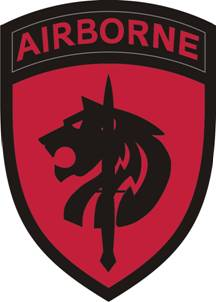
Special Operations Command Africa

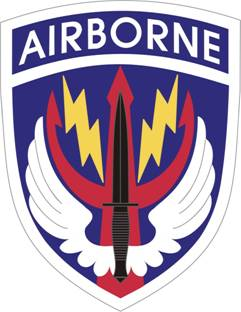
Special Operations Command Central

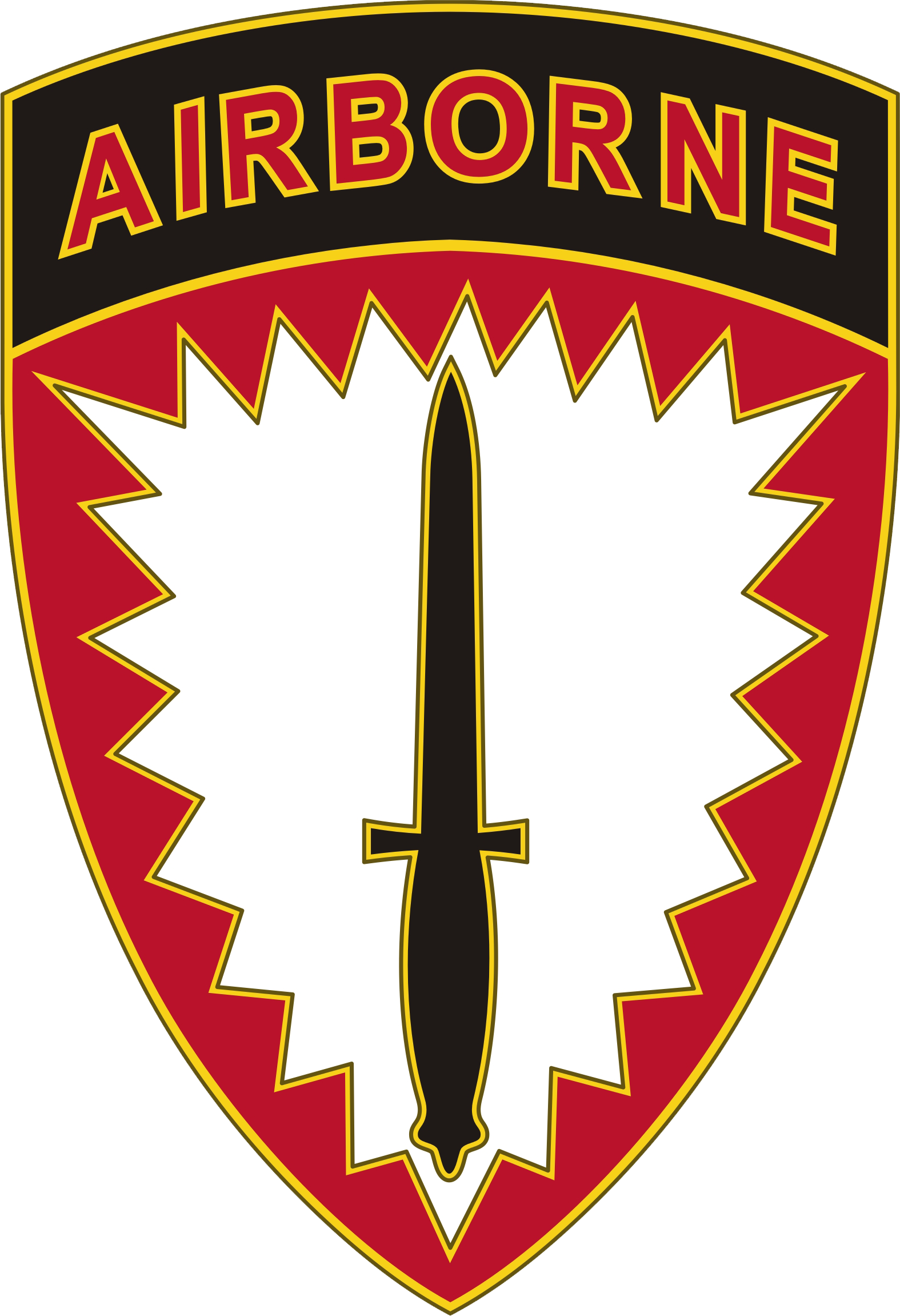
Special Operations Command Europe

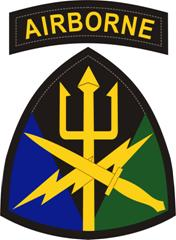
Special Operations Command, Joint Forces Command
2003–2013

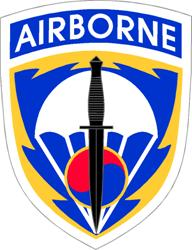
Special Operations Command Korea

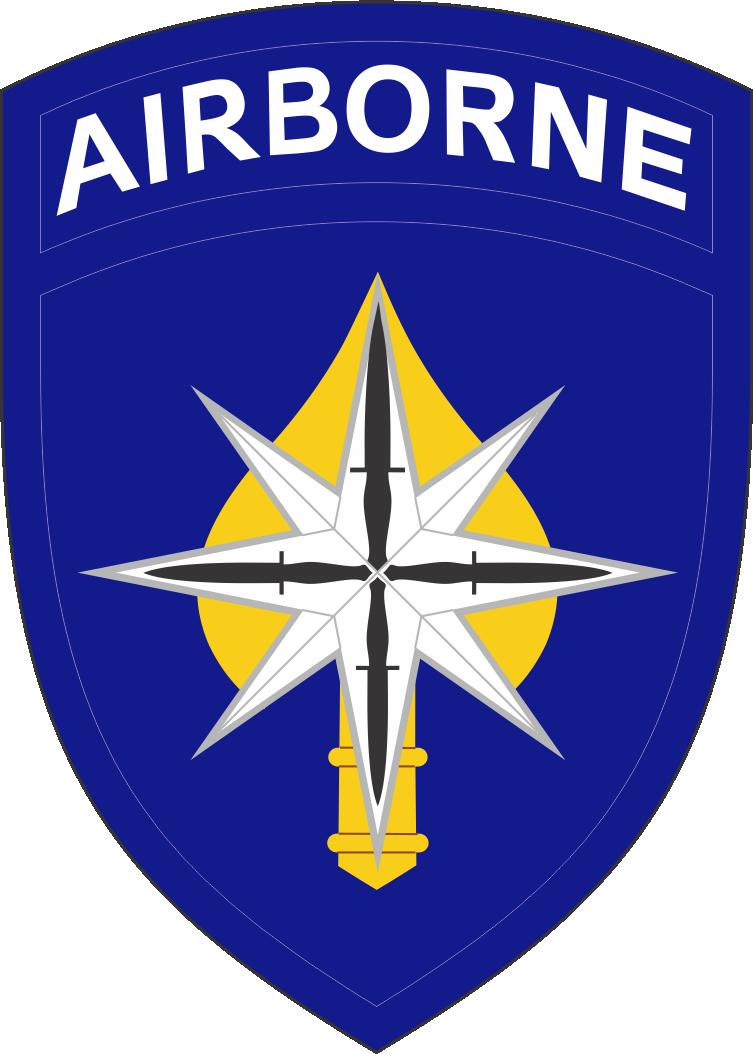
Special Operations Command North

Special Operations Command Pacific

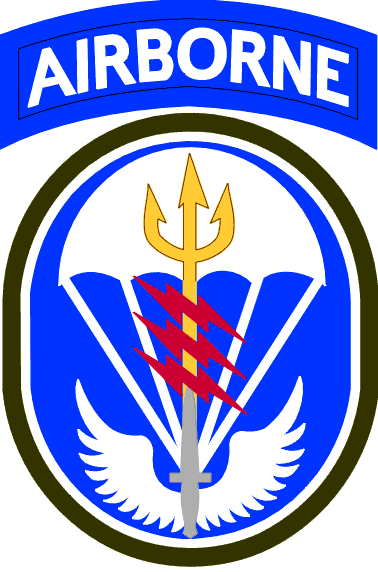
Special Operations Command South

== Sustainment commands (expeditionary) ==
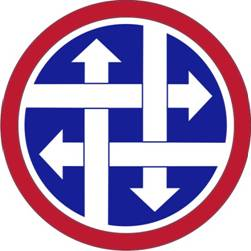
4th Sustainment Command (Expeditionary)

13th Sustainment Command (Expeditionary)

19th Sustainment Command (Expeditionary)

103rd Sustainment Command (Expeditionary)

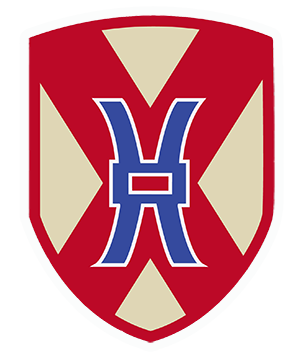
135th Sustainment Command (Expeditionary)

143rd Sustainment Command (Expeditionary)

184th Sustainment Command (Expeditionary)

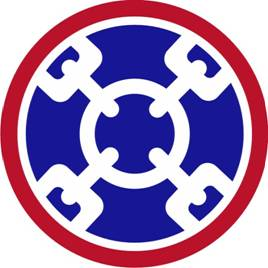
310th Sustainment Command (Expeditionary)

311th Sustainment Command (Expeditionary)

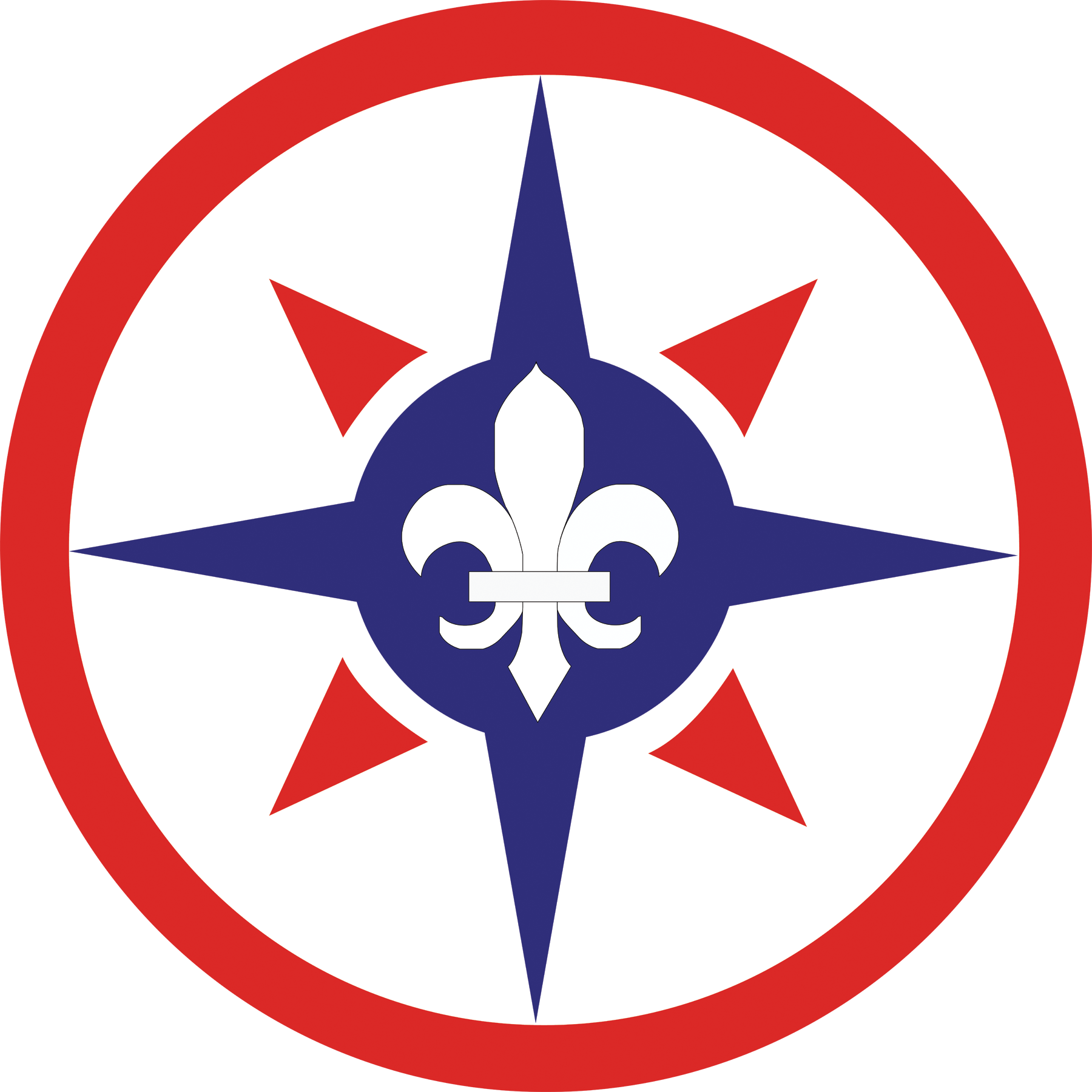
316th Sustainment Command (Expeditionary)

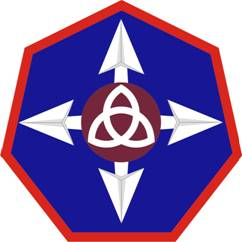
364th Expeditionary Sustainment Command

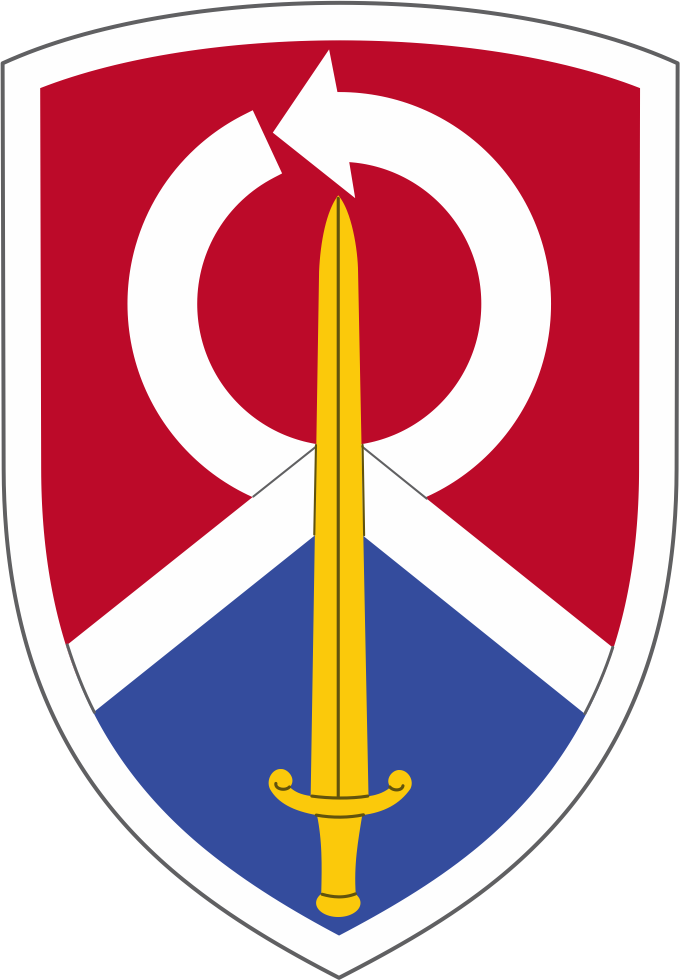
451st Expeditionary Sustainment Command

== Theater sustainment commands ==
1st Sustainment Command (Theater)

8th Theater Sustainment Command

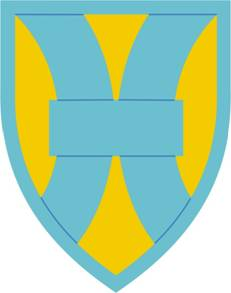
21st Theater Sustainment Command

79th Sustainment Support Command

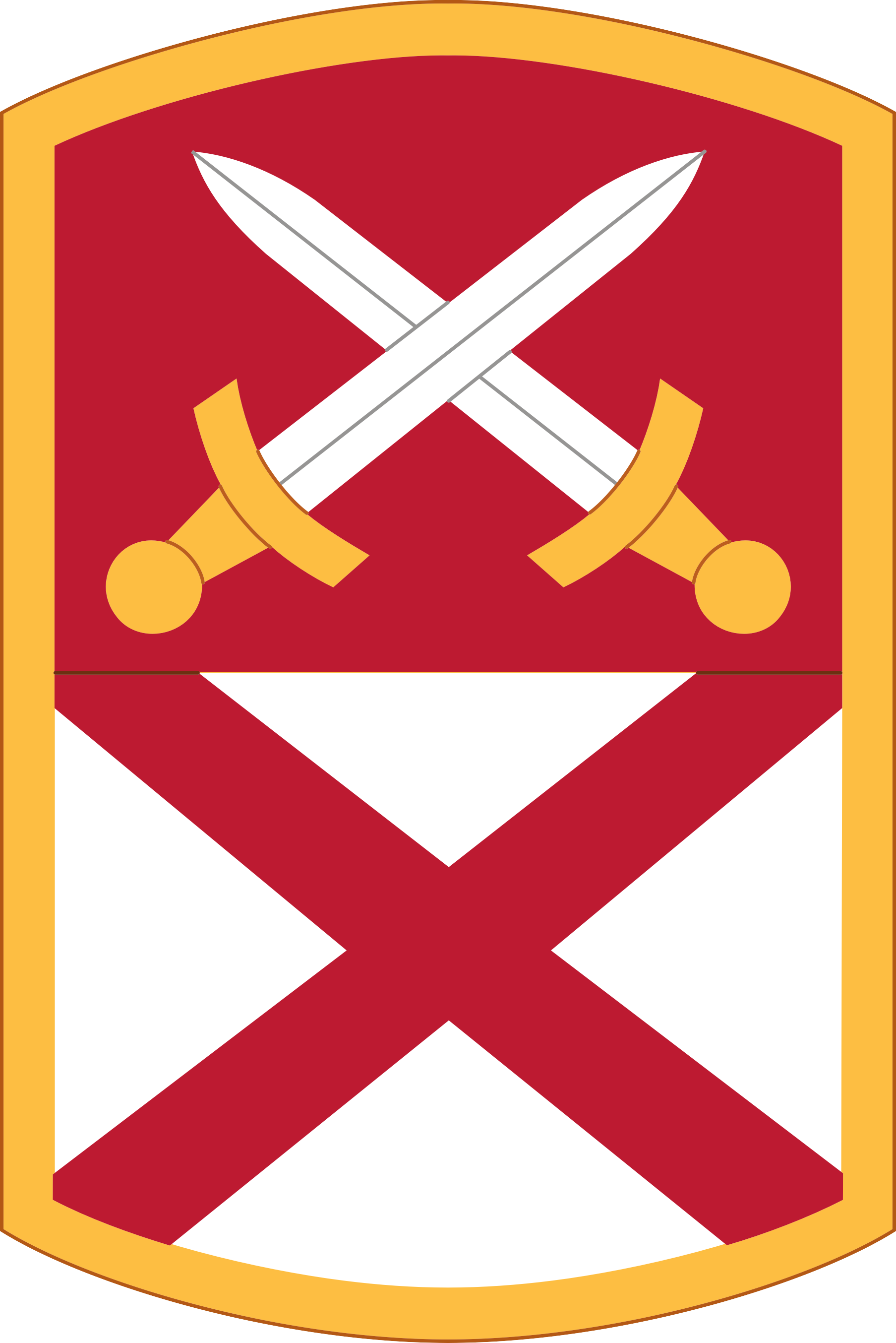
167th Theater Sustainment Command

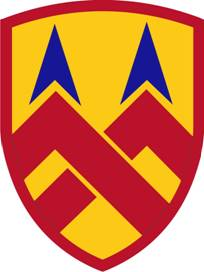
377th Theater Sustainment Command

== Training centers ==
Fort Irwin and the National Training Center

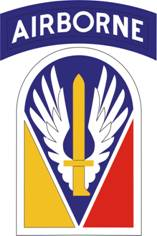
Fort Polk and the Joint Readiness Training Center

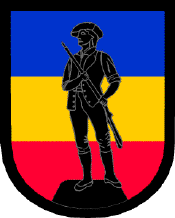
National Guard Regional Training Institute

== See also ==
- Field army insignia of the United States Army
- Corps insignia of the United States Army
- Division insignia of the United States Army
- Brigade insignia of the United States Army
- Obsolete shoulder sleeve insignia of the United States Army
