= 88th Brigade Support Battalion =

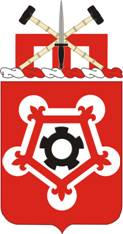
- 88th Support Battalion's Coat of Arms
- Active: 1941–1945; 1955–1962; 1965–1972; 2007–2014
- Country: USA
- Branch: U.S. Army
- Role: Mission Command of logistics units
- Size: Battalion
- Part of: 1st Maneuver Enhancement Brigade
- Garrison/HQ: Fort Polk, Louisiana
- Motto: " Muleskinners! "
- Anniversaries: 1 October 1933 unit constituted
- Battle honours: World War II; Vietnam

Insignia
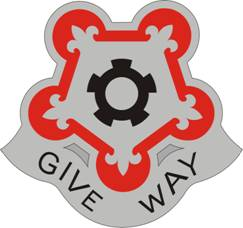
- Distinctive unit insignia

The 88th Brigade Support Battalion is a U.S. Army support battalion stationed at Fort Polk, Louisiana. The battalion motto is "Muleskinners!". The 88th has deployed overseas to France and Vietnam.

== Organization ==
The 88th BSB is currently inactive. It was assigned to the 1st Maneuver Enhancement Brigade until September 15, 2014. Subordinate elements at the time of its inactivation were:

- 88th Brigade Support Battalion (88th BSB)
  - Headquarters and Headquarters Company (HHC)
  - Alpha (Quartermaster) Company
  - Bravo (Maintenance)
  - 41st Transportation Company
  - 337th Signal Company
  - 383rd Movement Control Team (383rd MCT)
  - 546th Support Maintenance Company (546th SMC)

== Service history ==
=== Activation ===
The 88th Brigade Support Battalion was constituted in the Organized Reserve as the 19th Engineer Battalion (Heavy Pontoon) (Motorized) located in Cleveland, Ohio. In 1940, the 19th was redesignated as the 88th Engineer Battalion (Heavy Pontoon) (Motorized). The battalion was activated at Camp Beauregard, Louisiana, on June 2, 1941.

=== World War II ===
The 88th Engineer Battalion departed Boston on March 24, 1944, arriving in England on 5 April 1944 aboard the MV Santa Paula as shipment 0821-KK. The 88th arrived in Normandy on July 22. The 88th was assigned to Third Army's 1135th Engineer Group and built pontoon bridges across Normandy, Northern France, the Rhineland, the Ardennes, Alsace, and Germany. The Battalion constructed Class 40 rafts to ferry units across the Rhine River on 22 March 1944 as part of XII Corps. The 88th returned to the United States September 15, 1945, arriving in New York City as shipment R 6604-T. The 88th inactivated on 23 November 1945 in Texas.

=== Cold War ===
The battalion was brought back into service from 9 February 1955 through 15 May 1956 at Fort Carson, Colorado, as a general support Engineer unit. The 88th returned to France from December 1956 to September 1962 to provide Engineer support to NATO until the removal of all foreign troops from French soil.

=== Viet Nam ===
The battalion was reactivated at the Granite City Army Depot, Illinois, as an Engineer Depot Battalion June 1965 and deployed to Vietnam in September under the command of the 1st Logistics Command. The battalion converted to a supply and service battalion in June 1966 at Pleiku. Later in the war, the battalion was stationed at Tuy Hòa and Qui Nhơn. The battalion provided all classes of supply to units in the Northern II Corps Tactical Zone. The battalion redeployed to Travis Air Force Base, California and inactivated May 11, 1972.

=== Persian Gulf War ===
The battalion reactivated in the summer of 1991 as a provisional supply and service battalion to support the 2nd Area Support Group, 22nd Support Command at King Khalid Military City, Saudi Arabia and deactivated in February, 1992 in Kuwait City.

=== War on Terror ===
On 16 September 2007 the 88th Brigade Support Battalion was activated to support the 1st Maneuver Enhancement Brigade at Fort Polk, Louisiana. On 15 September 2014, the 88th inactivated for the fifth time.

== Campaign streamers ==
Conflict	Streamer	Year(s)
World War II	Normandy	1944
World War II	Rhineland	1944
World War II	Central Europe	1944
World War II	Ardennes-Alsace	1944
World War II	Northern France	1944
Vietnam War	Counteroffensive, Phase II	1966–67
Vietnam War	Counteroffensive, Phase III	1967–68
Vietnam War	Tet Counteroffensive	1968

== Decorations ==
US Army Superior Unit Award PO 350-09, 1 OCT 11- 30 SEP 13

Ribbon	Award	Year	Notes
	Meritorious Unit Commendation (Army)	1967–1968	Vietnam
	Superior Unit Award (Army)	2011-2013	Defense Chemical, Biological, Radiological & Nuclear Response Force Mission

== Shoulder sleeve insignia ==
- Description: A rectangular shape device pointed at base 3 1/4 inches (8.26 cm) in height and 2 1/4 inches (5.72 cm) in width overall divided per pale golden yellow and teal blue, a silver gray sword palewise point down with a black hilt, on the hilt and upper portion of the blade is a scarlet fusil; all within a 1/8 inch (.32 cm) black border.
- Background: The shoulder sleeve insignia was originally approved for the 1st Combat Support Brigade (Maneuver Enhancement) effective 16 September 2007. It was redesignated for the 1st Maneuver Enhancement Brigade on 1 February 2008. (TIOH Drawing Number A-1-931)

== Distinctive unit insignia ==
- Description/Blazon: A silver color metal and enamel device 1 1/8 inches (2.86 cm) in height overall consisting of a scarlet penta-foil bearing a silver pentagon, corners terminating in fleurs-de-lis and charged with a black annulet embattled of five, in base a silver scroll bearing the motto in black letters "GIVE WAY."
- Symbolism: Scarlet and white are the colors used for the Engineers, the original unit designation. The penta-foil refers to the five component elements of the Headquarters and Headquarters Detachment, Engineer Battalion (Depot). The pentagon fleury device and gear allude to embattled depot areas and to the organization's five battle honors received in World War II. The motto "Give Way" of the former Engineer Construction Battalion is retained as a historical connection to the present battalion.
- Background: The distinctive unit insignia was originally approved for the 88th Engineer Battalion on 6 April 1966. It was redesignated for the 88th Supply and Service Battalion on 14 July 1967. The insignia was redesignated effective 16 September 2007, for the 88th Support Battalion with description and symbolism updated.

== Coat of arms ==
Description/Blazon

- Shield: Gules, on a penta-foil Argent a pentagon ensigned at each corner with a fleur-de-lis of the first, charged with a pentagon of the second, bearing a gear Sable.
- Crest: From a wreath Argent and Gules, a fesse embattled couped reversed of the second surmounted by two sledge hammers in saltire, handles bamboo of eight segments Proper, the hammer head Sable, overall a dagger palewise, point up, hand guard of the third edged of the first, the blade Gris.
- Motto: GIVE WAY.

Symbolism

- Shield: Scarlet and white are the colors used for the Engineers, the original unit designation. The penta-foil refers to the five component elements of the Headquarters and Headquarters Detachment, Engineer Battalion (Depot). The pentagon fleury device and gear allude to embattled depot areas and to the organization's five battle honors received in World War II. The motto "Give Way" of the former Engineer Construction Battalion is retained as a historical connection to the present battalion.
- Crest: The fesse embattled couped alludes to the operation symbol for Engineers and the unit's past branch affiliation. The three crenels denote the Meritorious Unit Commendations awarded to the battalion for duty in Vietnam. The sledge hammers denote the unit's construction function and each segment of the handles suggest the Vietnam campaign credits. The dagger signifies military readiness.

Background

- The coat of arms was approved for the 88th Support Battalion effective 16 September 2007.
