= Corps insignia of the United States Army =

Shoulder sleeve insignia (SSI) are cloth emblems worn on the shoulders of US Army uniforms to identify the primary headquarters to which a soldier is assigned.

== Airborne Corps ==
XVIII Airborne Corps

== Armored Corps ==
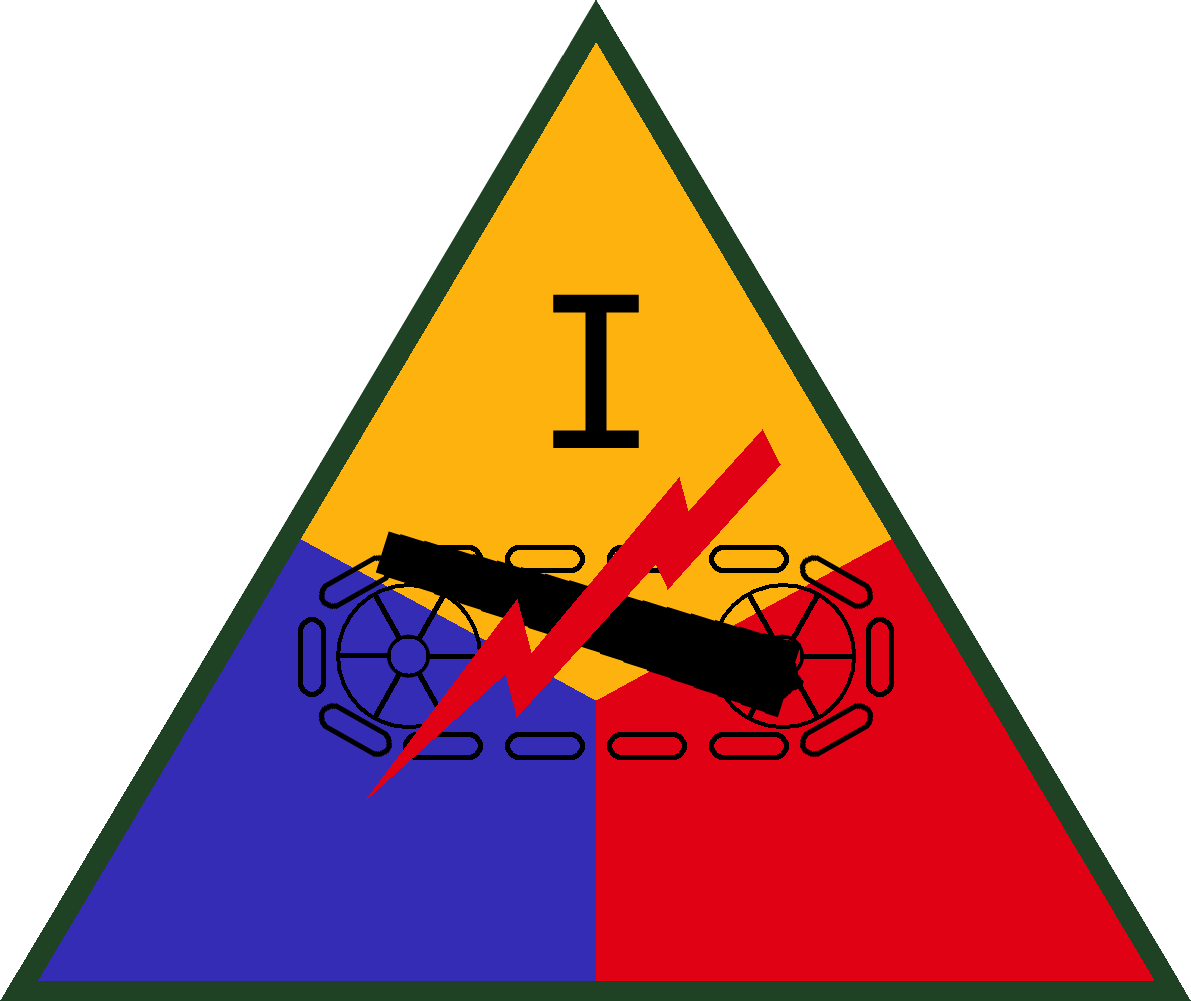
I Armored Corps

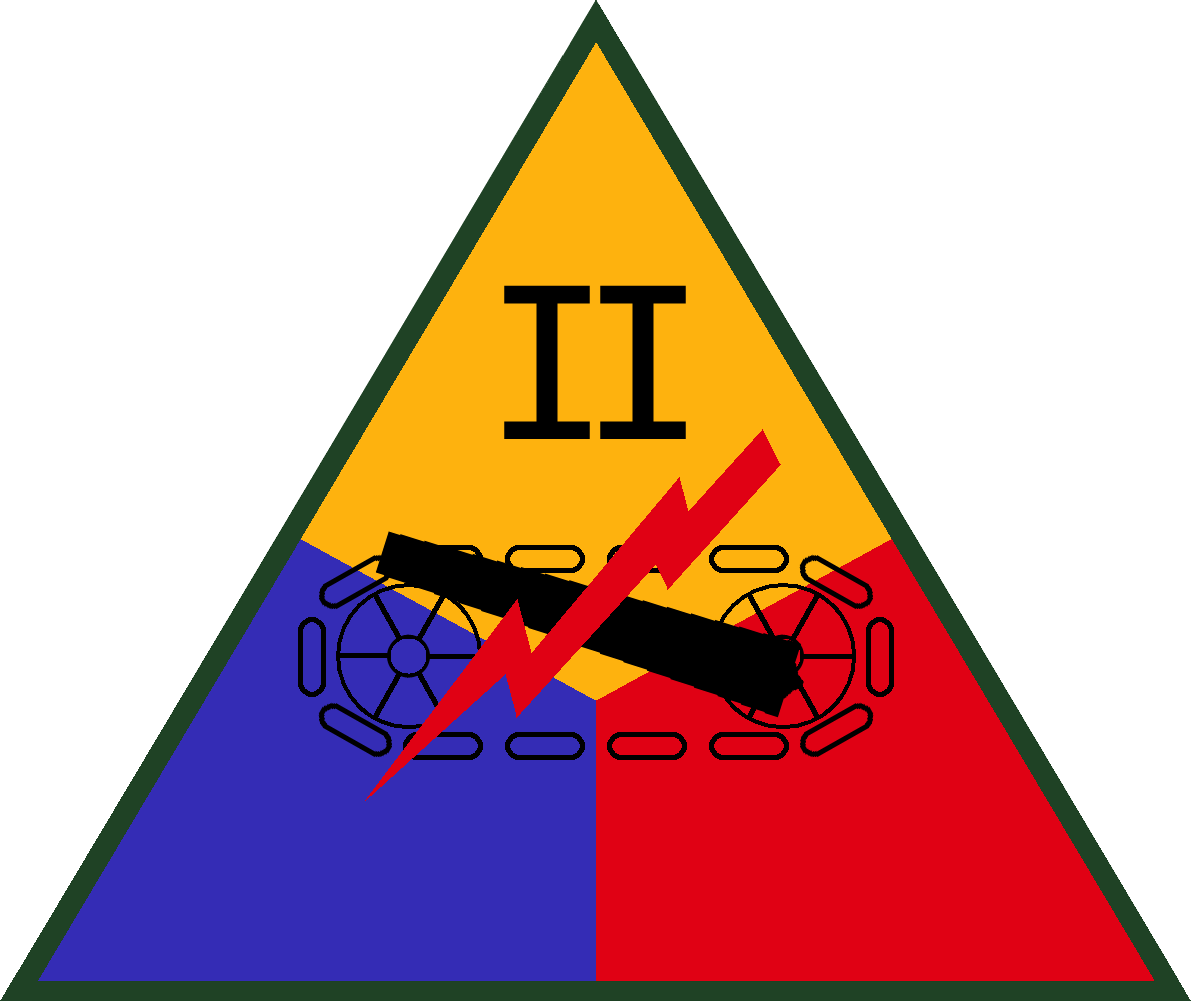
II Armored Corps

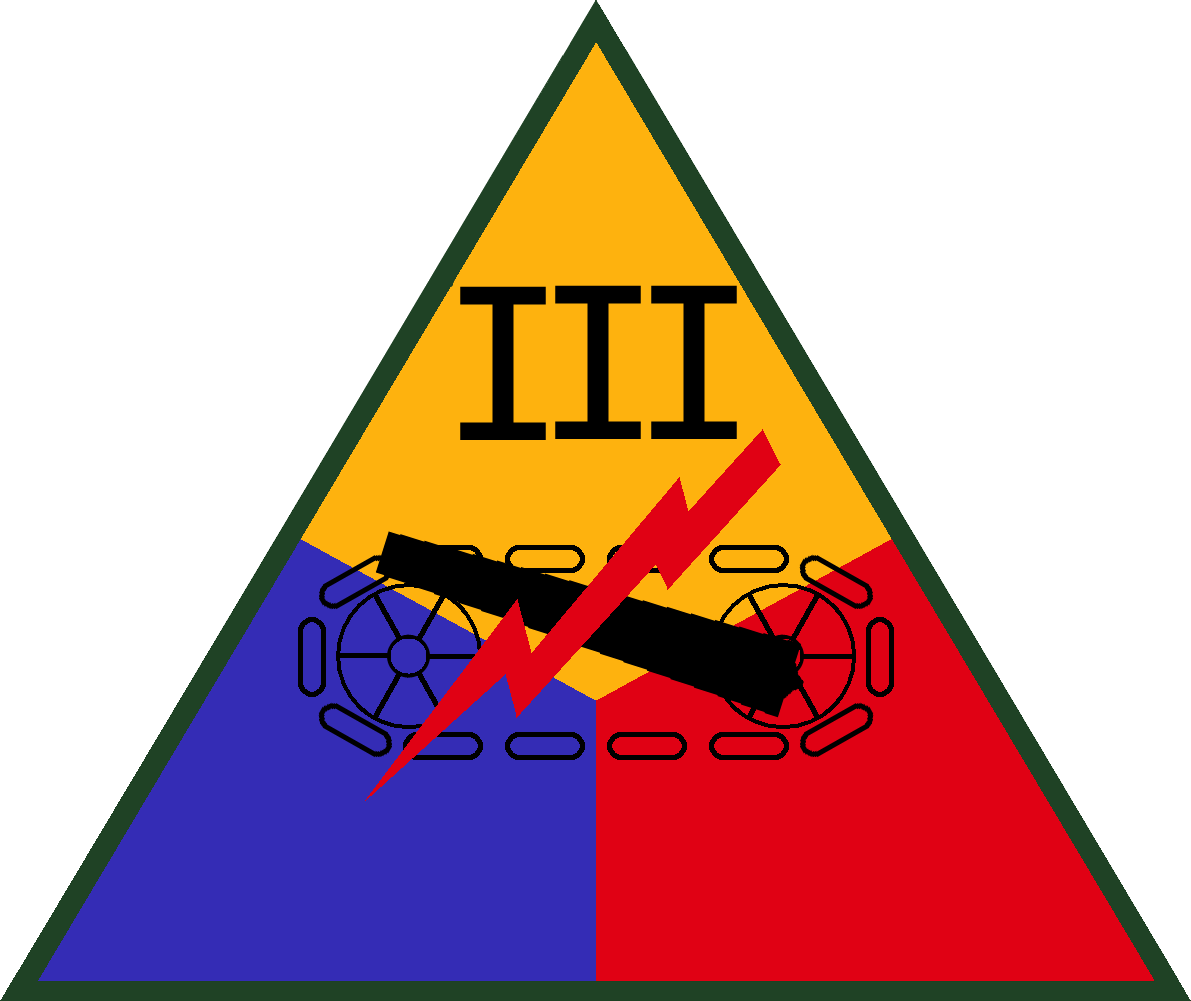
III Armored Corps

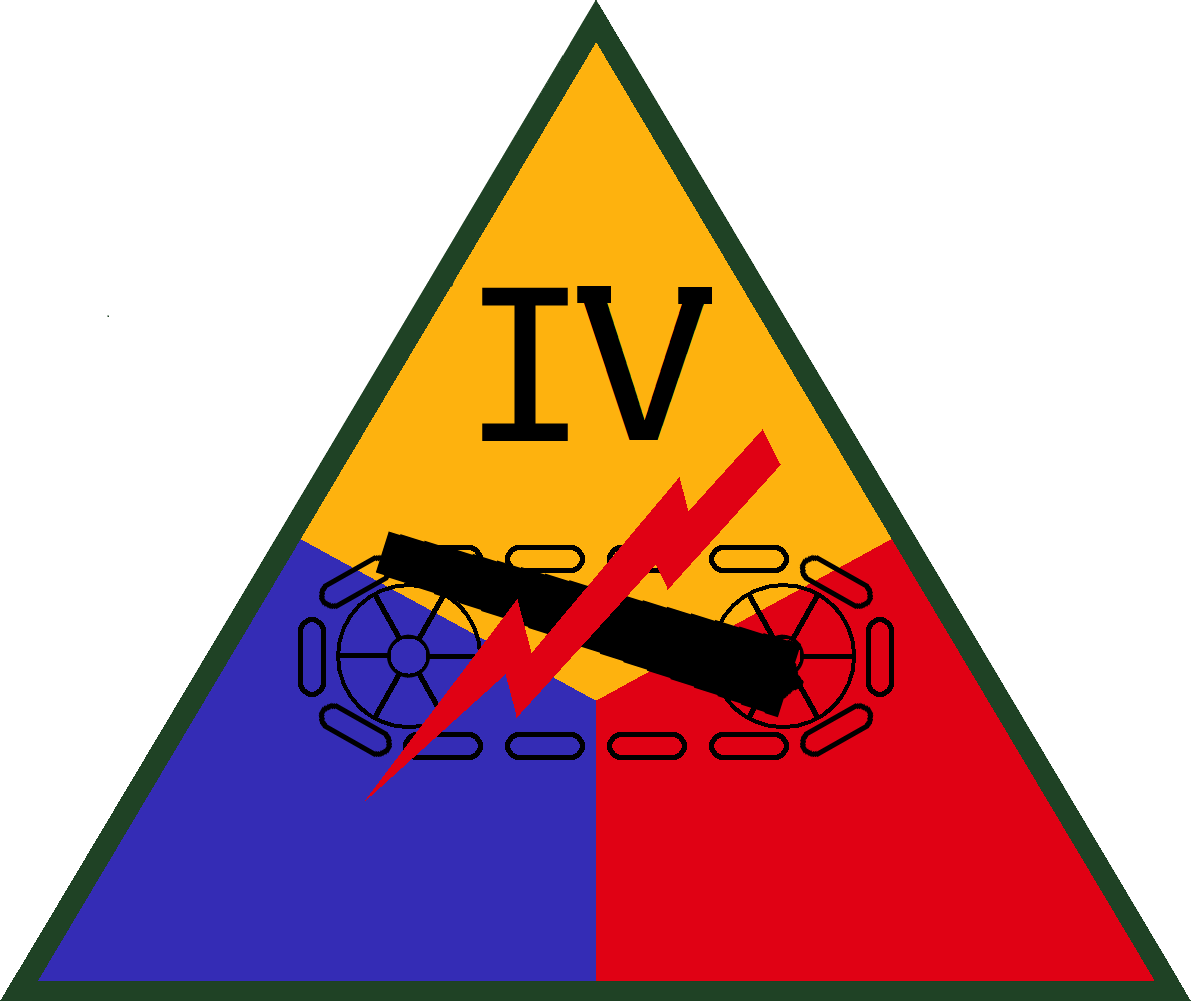
IV Armored Corps

== Army Corps ==
I Corps

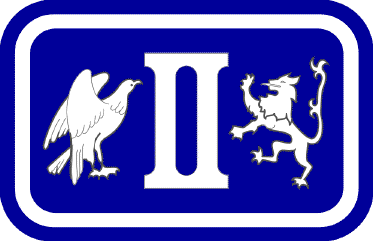
II Corps

III Corps

IV Corps

V Corps

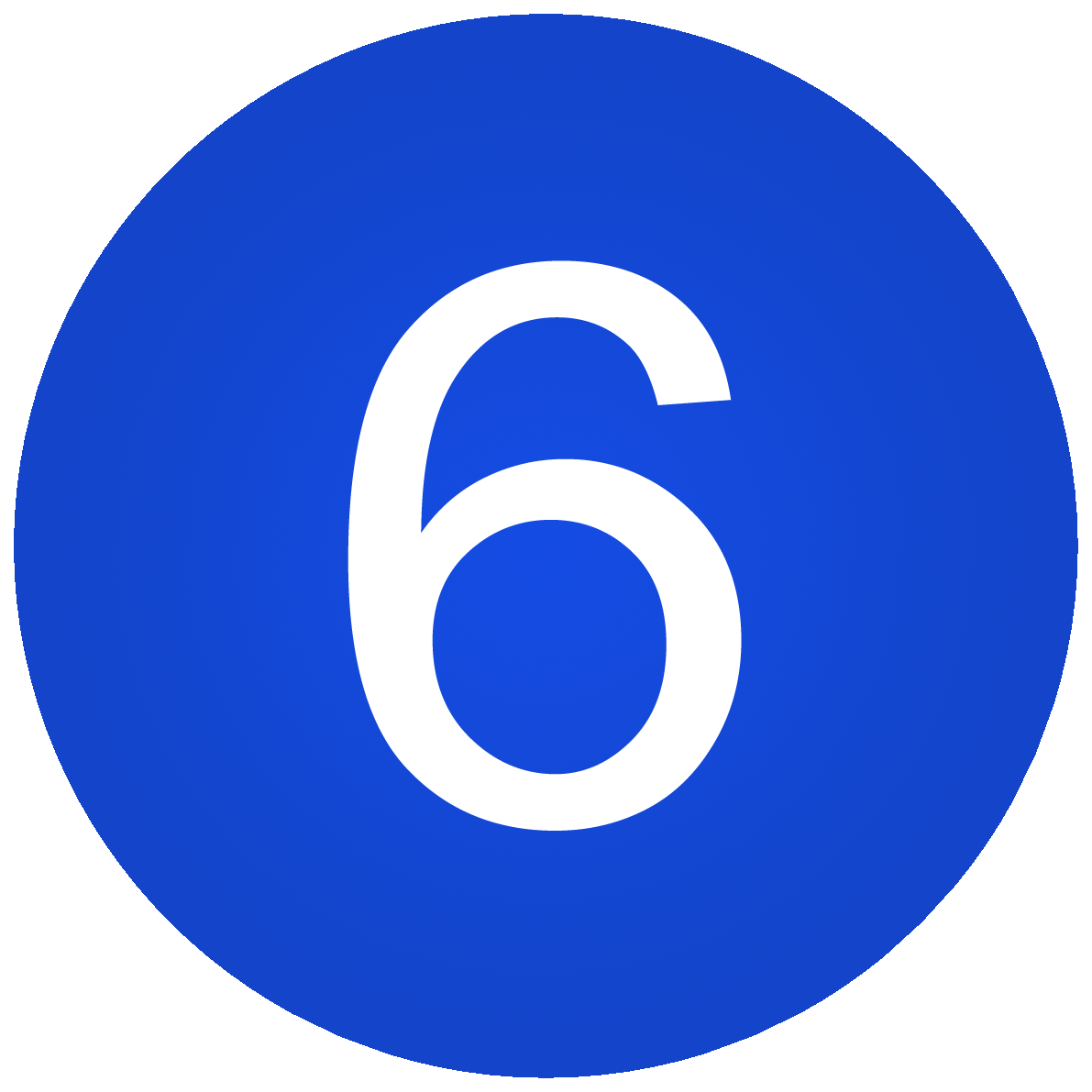
VI Corps

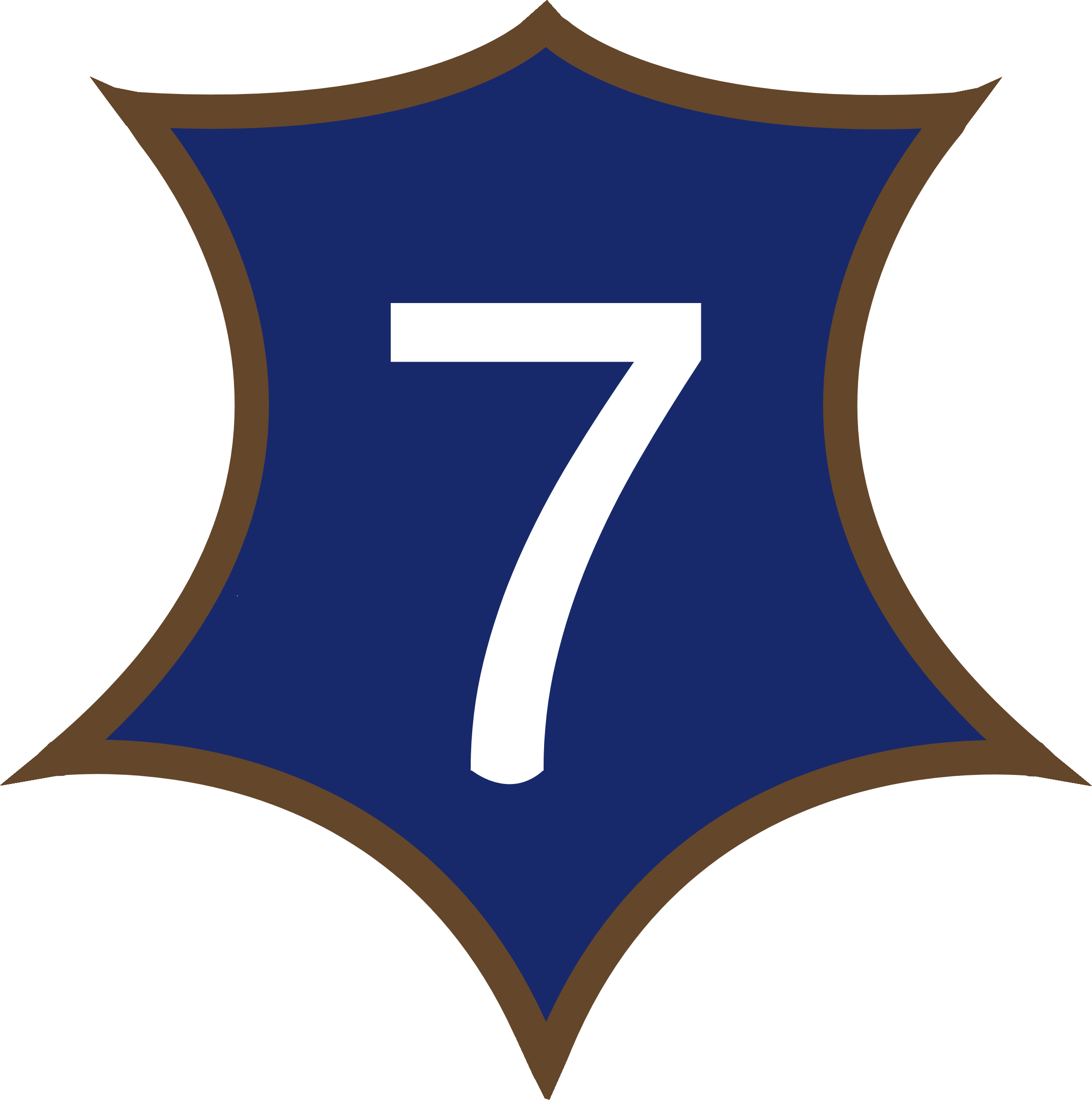
VII Corps
Prior to 28 April 1944

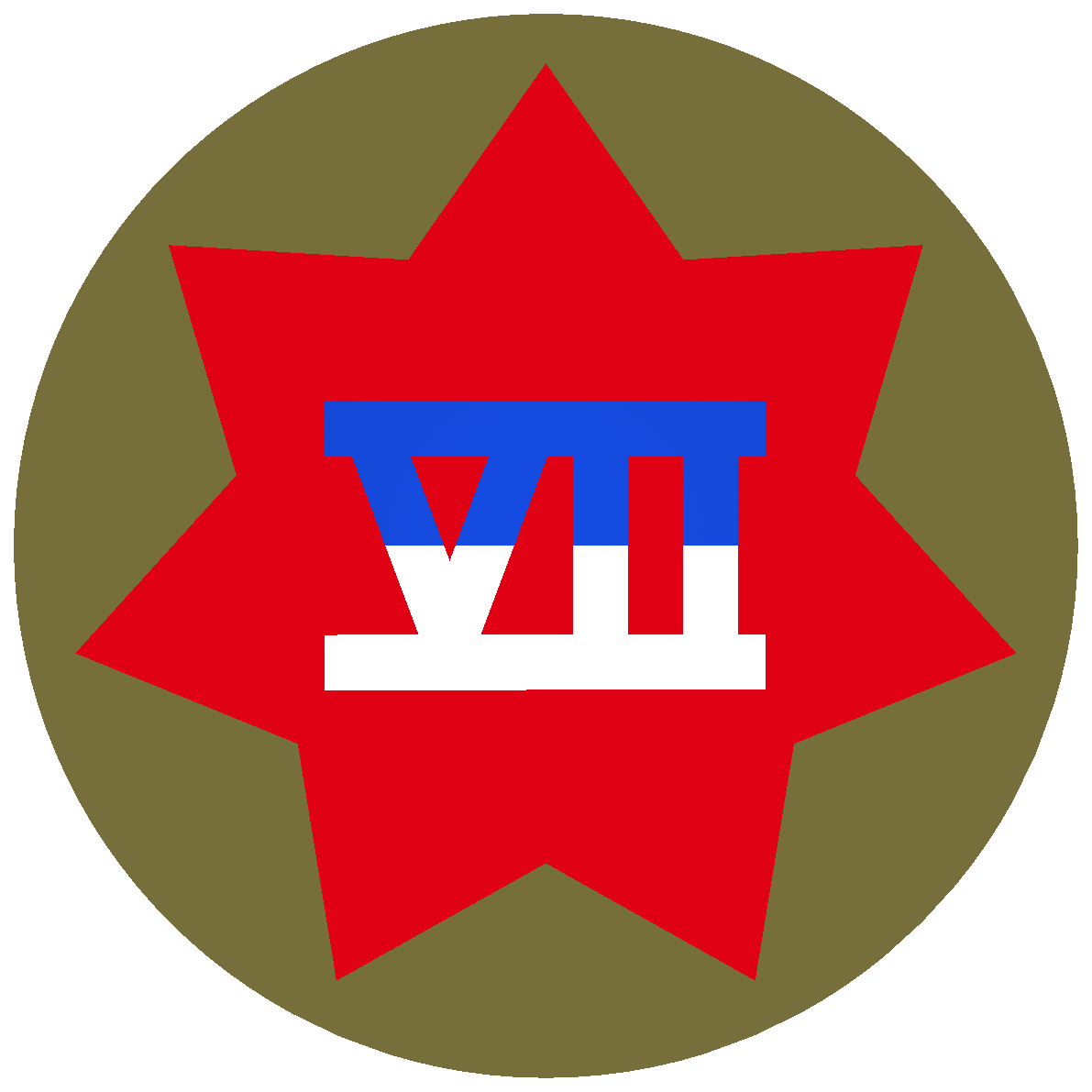
VII Corps
After 28 April 1944

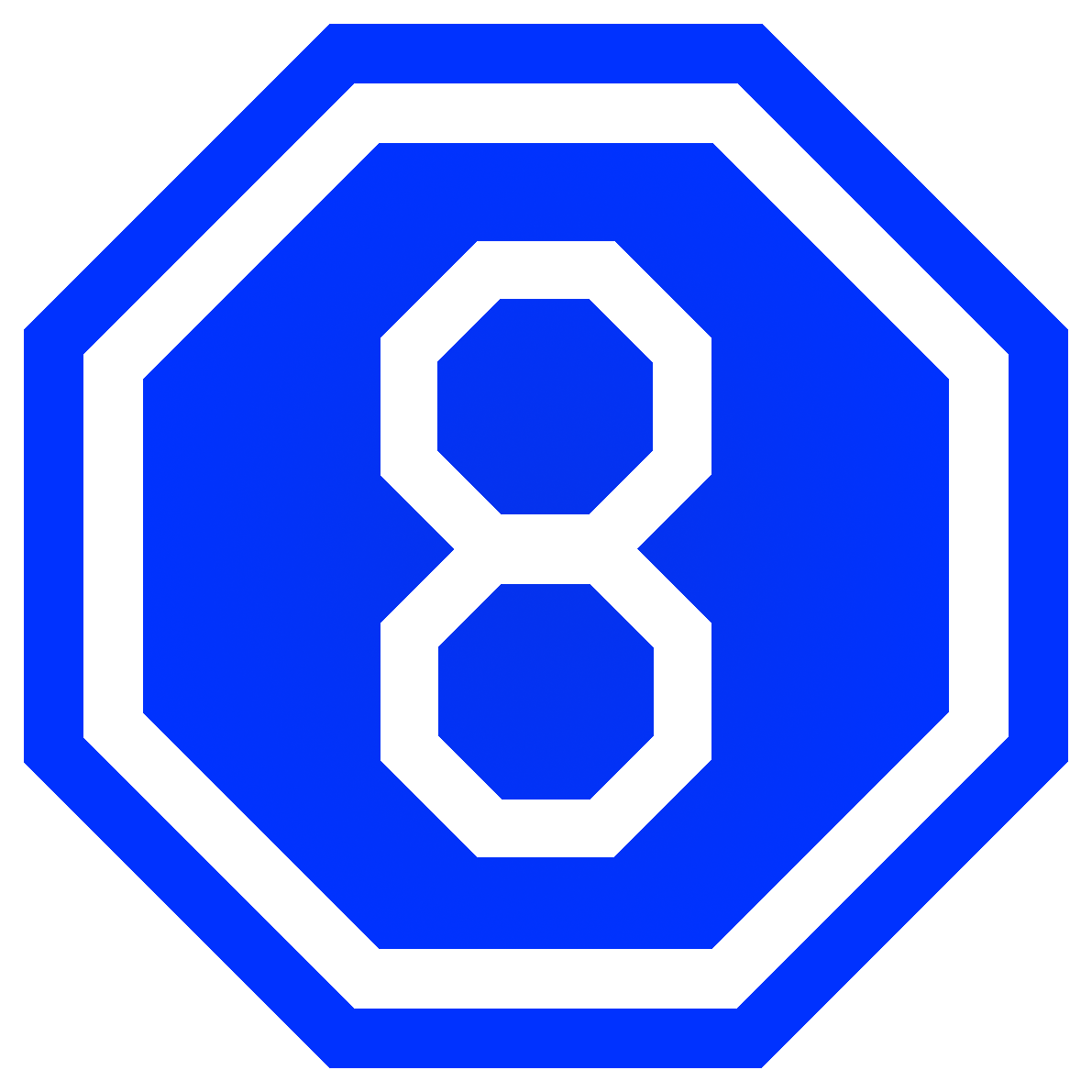
VIII Corps

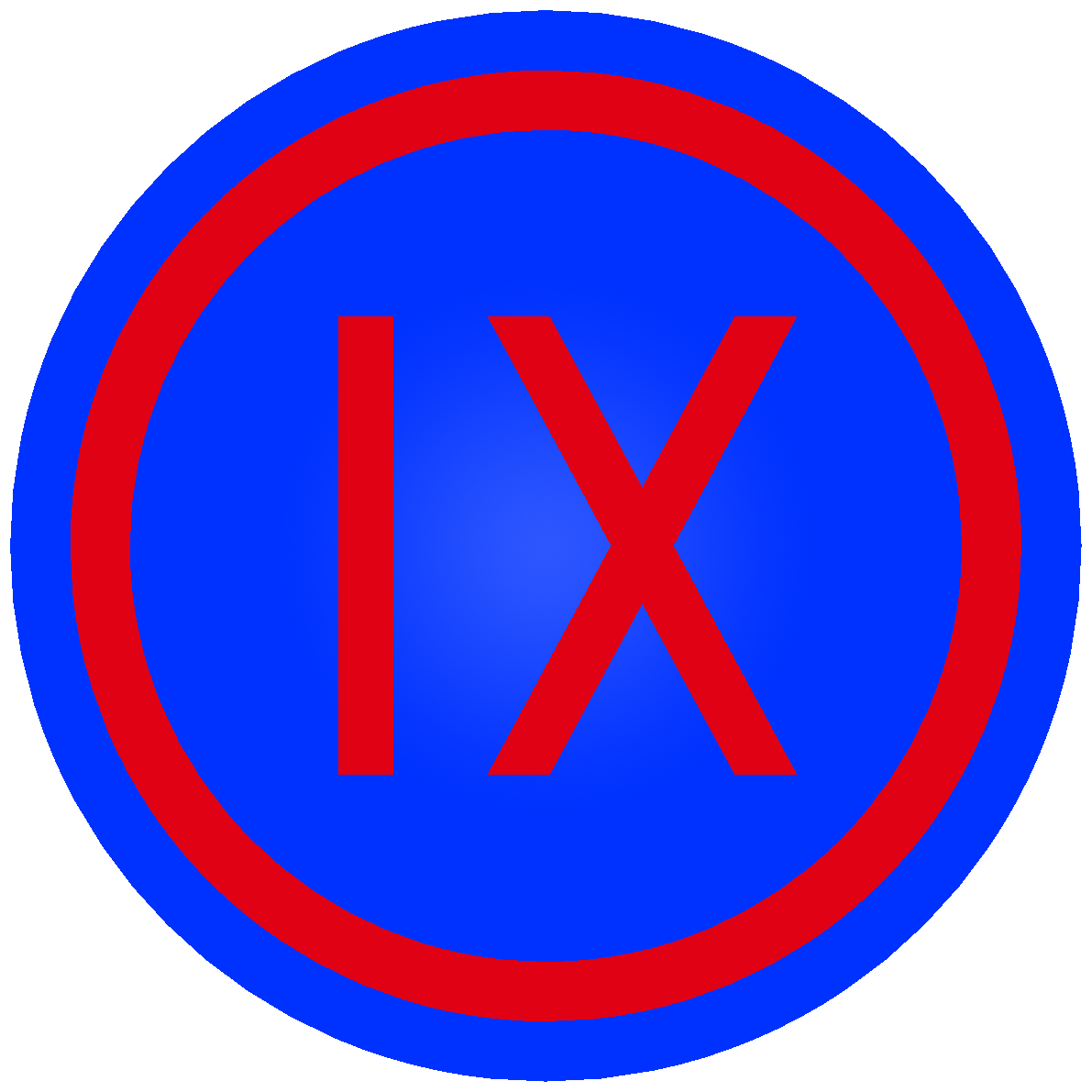
IX Corps

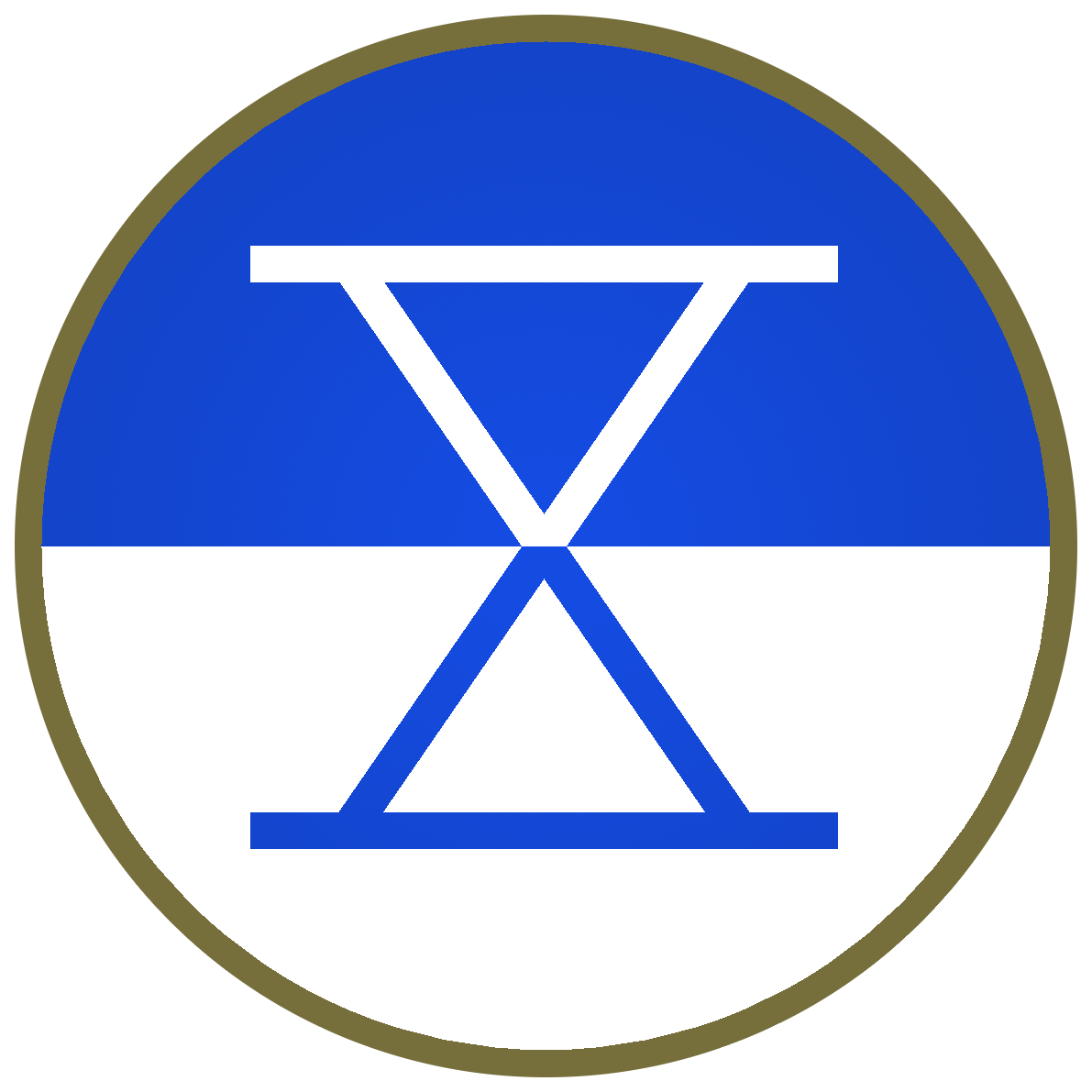
X Corps

XI Corps

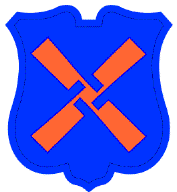
XII Corps

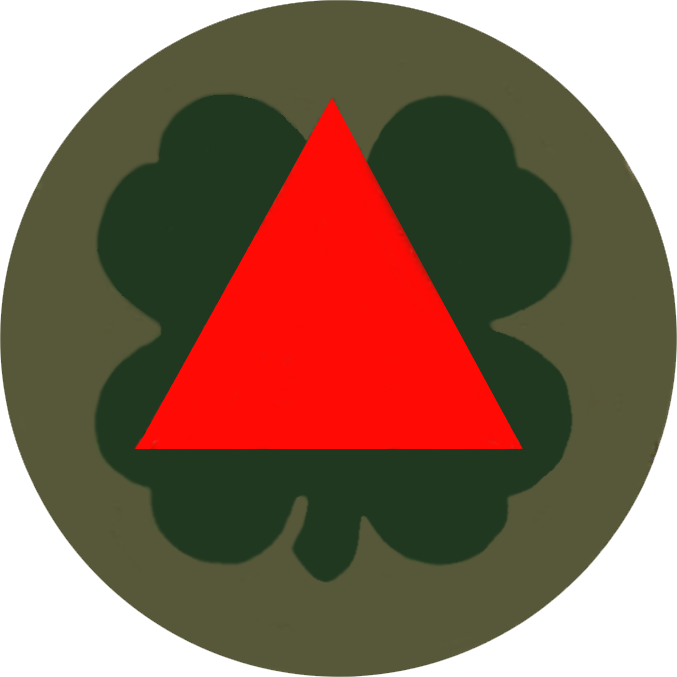
XIII Corps

XIV Corps

XV Corps

XVI Corps

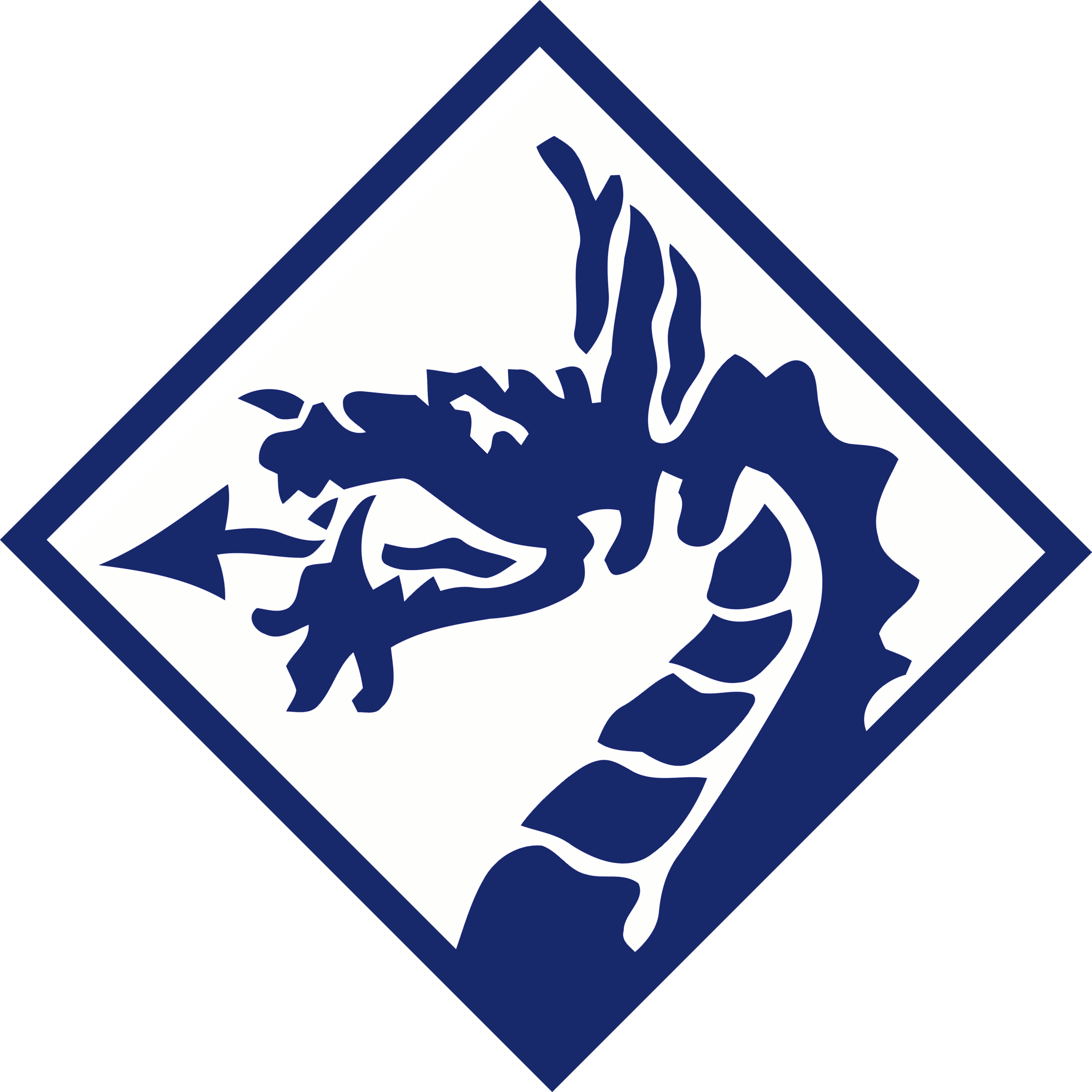
XVIII Corps
9 October 1943 - 25 August 1944

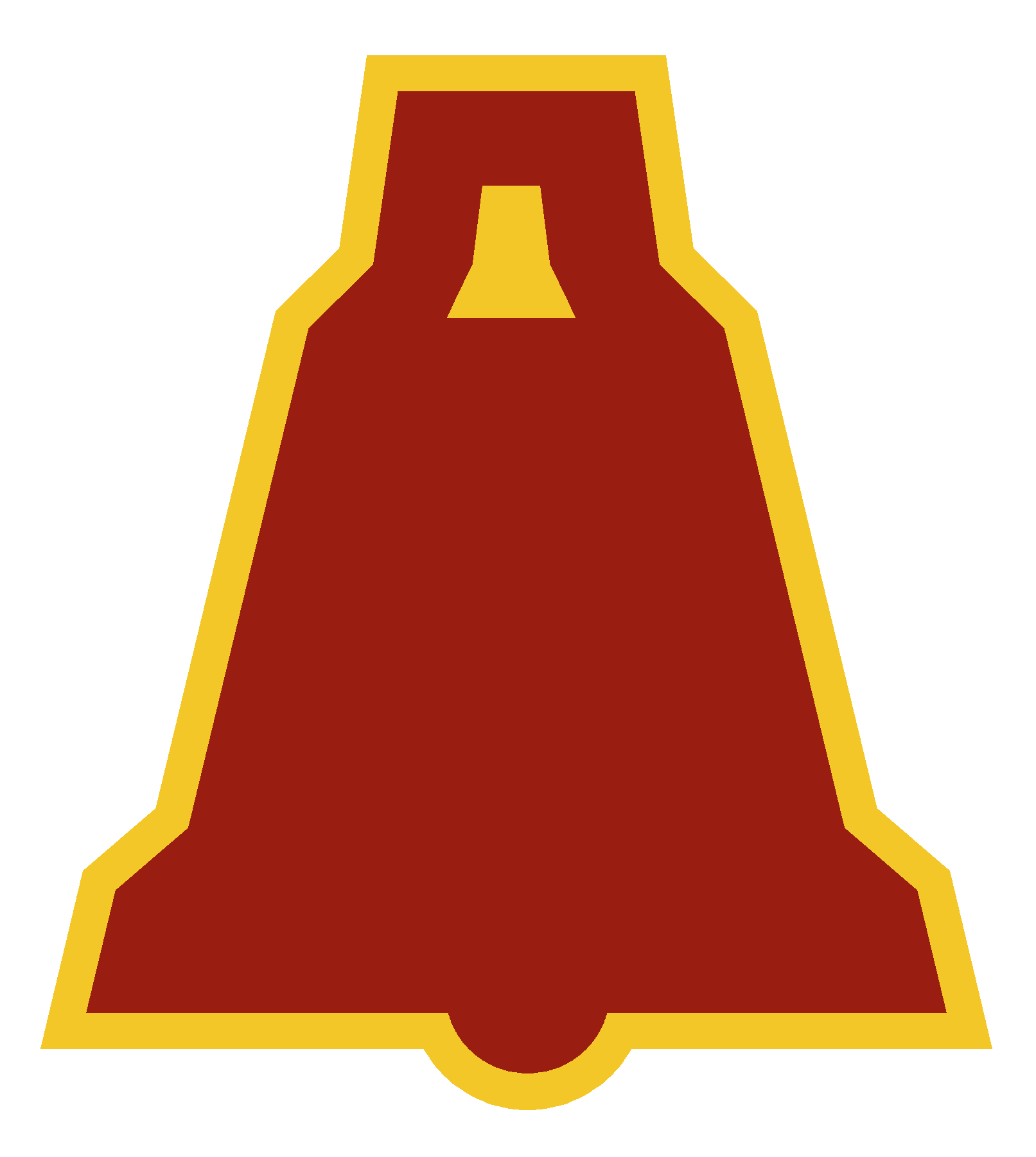
XIX Corps
2 October 1935 - 1 October 1943

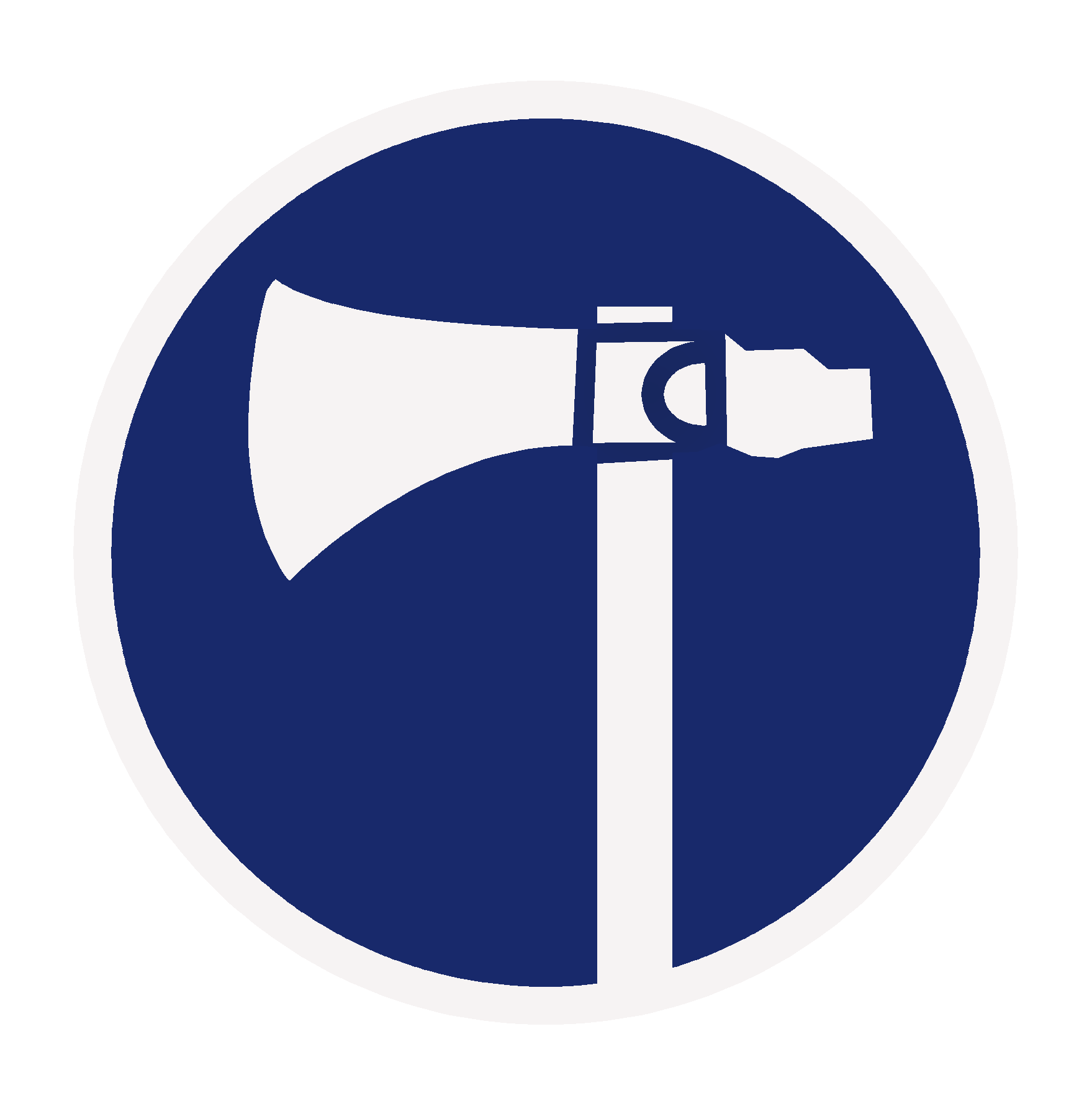
XIX Corps
October 1943 - 10 March 1949

XIX Corps
After 10 March 1949
This patch unofficially began use around January 1944 and was the primary patch used during WWII

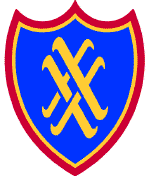
XX Corps

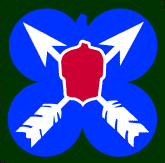
XXI Corps

XXII Corps

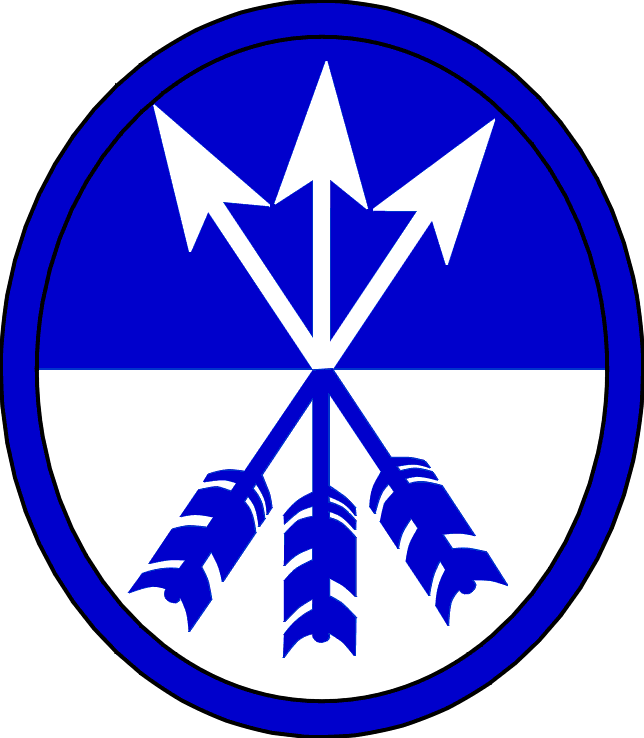
XXIII Corps

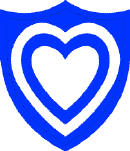
XXIV Corps

XXXI Corps
"Phantom Unit"

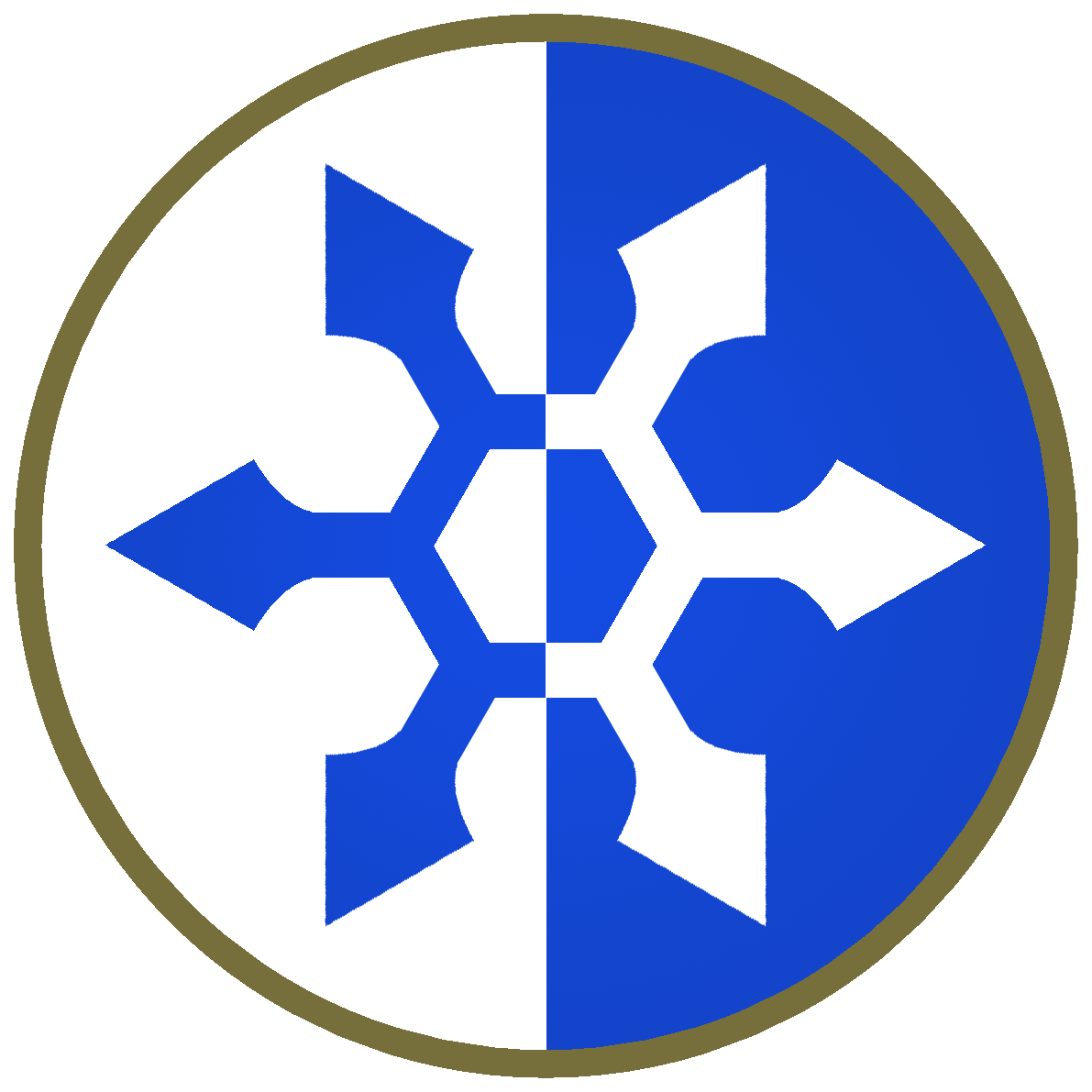
XXXIII Corps
"Phantom Unit"

XXXVI Corps
10 July 1944 - 12 July 1950

== See also ==
- Field army insignia of the United States Army
- Division insignia of the United States Army
- Brigade insignia of the United States Army
- Miscellaneous shoulder sleeve insignia of the United States Army
- Obsolete shoulder sleeve insignia of the United States Army
- American Civil War corps badges
