= 1st Maneuver Enhancement Brigade =

- 1st Maneuver Enhancement Brigade shoulder sleeve insignia
- Active: 3 January 2006 to 17 August 2015
- Country: United States
- Branch: U.S. Army
- Role: Combat Support
- Size: Brigade
- Part of: FORSCOM
- Garrison/HQ: Fort Polk
- Nickname: Guardians
- Motto: Enhancing The Warrior Spirit
- Colors: Teal and Gold
- Anniversaries: Constituted 3 January 2006, Activated 16 September 2007, Redesignated 1 February 2008
- Engagements: Operation Enduring Freedom

Insignia
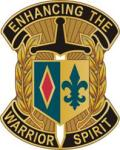
- Distinctive Unit Insignia

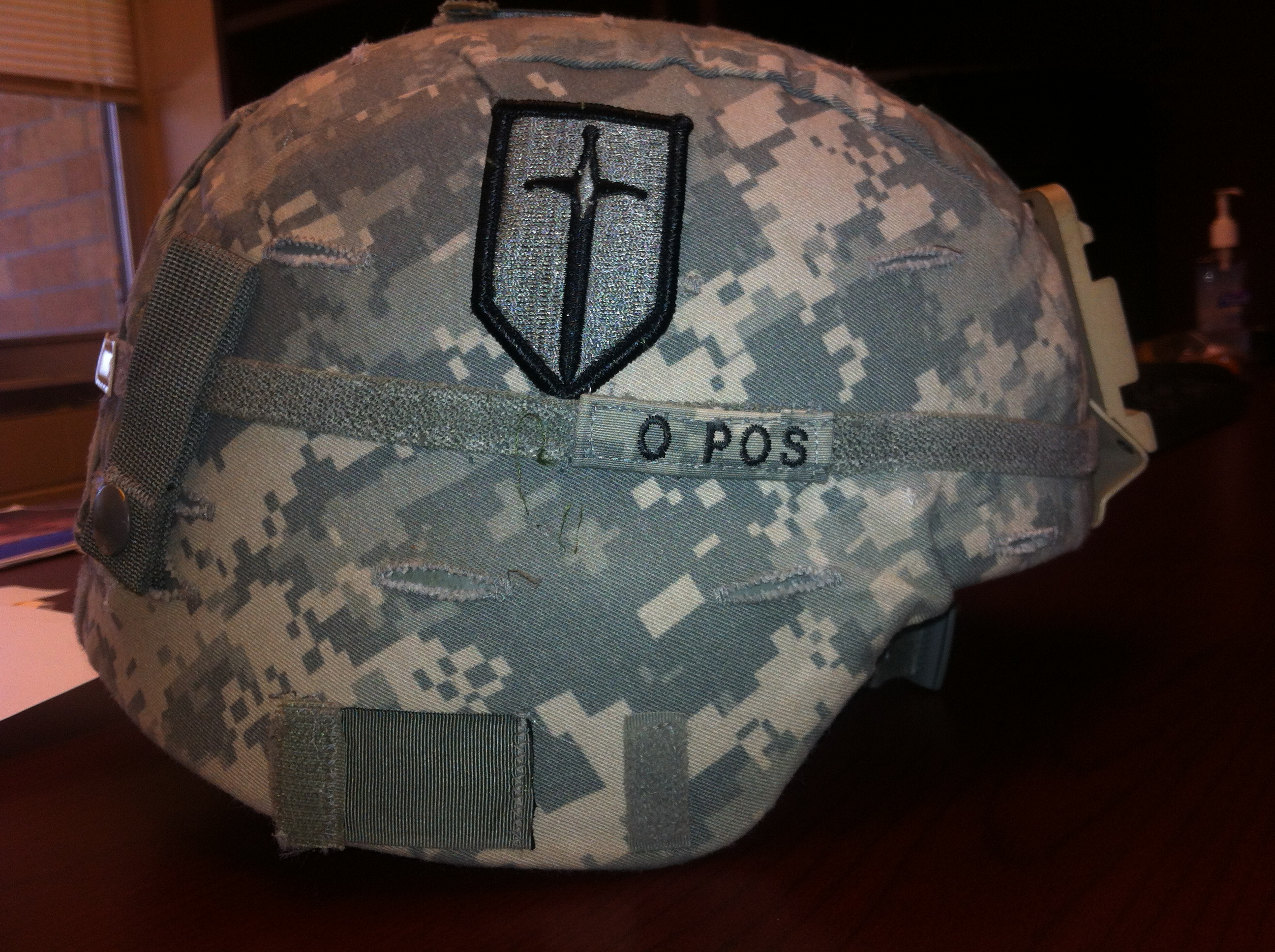
- Helmet Insignia

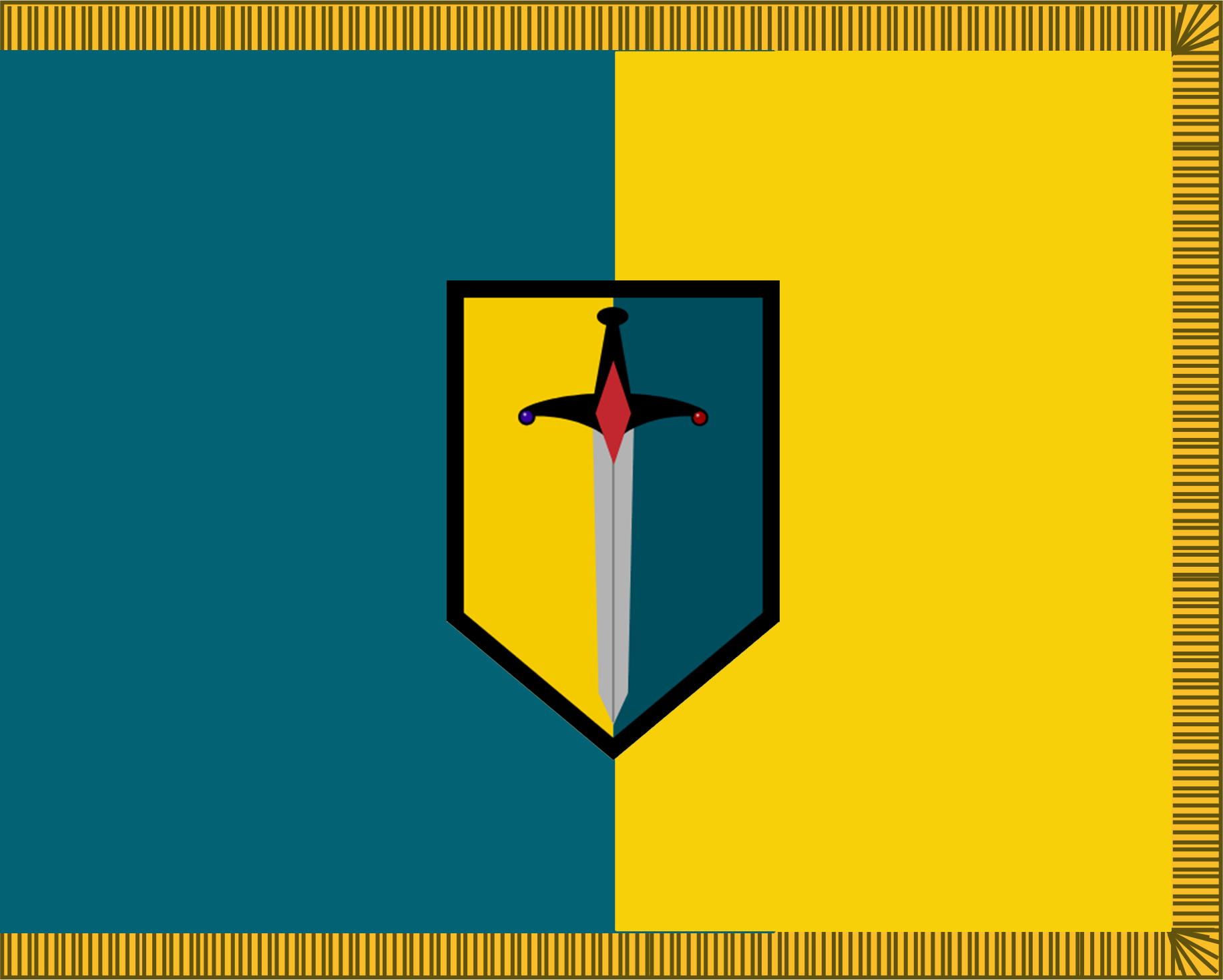
- 1st Maneuver Enhancement Brigade Flag

The 1st Maneuver Enhancement Brigade (1st MEB) was a United States Army brigade located at Fort Polk, Louisiana. The Brigade was tasked to improve the movement capabilities and rear area security for commanders at division level or higher. The Brigade has deployed units for combat operations in Afghanistan, Iraq, and for humanitarian assistance in Haiti after the 2010 earthquake.

The MEB is a tailored combined arms force with a headquarters staff designed to plan and execute protection, movement and maneuver, and sustainment tasks. It uses its subordinate units within their specialties to conduct maneuver support operations in its area of operations (AO) and within the broader AO of the organization it supports. The MEB provides added security and defense for other units and enhances freedom of action for the supported higher command. The capability to synchronize maneuver support operations and support area operations under the MEB provides a unique set of capabilities to other Army, joint, and multinational elements. Aside from its headquarters element and the organic communications and logistics elements that form the basis for commanding, controlling, and supporting the brigade, the Brigade is a mission, enemy, terrain and weather, troops and support available, time available, and civil considerations-dependent organization. The MEB leverages the current modular principles and the "plug-and-play" nature of current forces to apply the right force for the mission. Typically, but not exclusively, the MEB is composed of engineer, military police, chemical, air defense, and other units that routinely function together during protection, stability, and support operations.

== Unit history ==
=== Afghanistan 2008–2009 ===
From Jun 2008 through Sep 2009, the Brigade was deployed to Afghanistan as part of Operation Enduring Freedom to act as the tactical command element for Bagram Airfield, a French infantry battalion and the Provincial Reconstruction Teams in the Parwan Province. The unit earned a Campaign Streamer embroidered "Consolidation II" and the Meritorious Unit Citation for this mission.

=== Defense CBRNE (Chemical, Radiological, Biological, Nuclear, and Explosive) Response Force 2011–2013 ===
The Brigade was committed to the United States Northern Command and United States Army North as part of Joint Task Force-Civil Support to serve as the CBRNE Consequence Management Response Force, and served as an on-call federal response force for terrorist attacks and other natural or manmade emergencies and disasters. This assistance is termed "Defense Support of Civil authorities". This response is subject to the limitations of the Posse Comitatus Act. See also the National Response Framework.

=== Currently ===
On 23 February 2015 the U.S. Army Center of Military History authorized the special designation "Guardian Brigade" for the 1st Maneuver Enhancement Brigade. The 1st Maneuver Enhancement Brigade inactivated on 17 August 2015. The 46th Engineer Battalion was assigned to the 20th Engineer Brigade at Fort Bragg. The 519th Military Police Battalion was assigned to the 16th Military Police Brigade at Fort Bragg.

== Composition ==
The 1st MEB was composed of the following units at the time of its inactivation:

- Headquarters & Headquarters Company
- 46th Engineer Battalion (Heavy)
  - Headquarters and Headquarters Company
  - Forward Support Company
  - 22d Engineer Detachment (Survey)
  - 93d Engineer Engineer Company (Vertical)
  - 524th Engineer Detachment (Fire Fighting)
  - 573d Engineer Company (Clearance)
  - 687th Engineer Company (Horizontal)
  - 814th Engineer Company (Multi-Role Bridge)
- 519th Military Police Battalion
  - Headquarters and Headquarters Detachment
  - 41st Transportation Company
  - 50th Military Police Detachment (Military Working Dogs)
  - 91st Military Police Detachment (Law & Order)
  - 204th Military Police Company
  - 258th Military Police Company
  - 383d Transportation Detachment (Movement Control)

== Formerly assigned subordinate units ==
- Headquarters and Support Company, 46th Engineer Battalion (reorganized into the Headquarters & Headquarters Company, and the Forward Support Company for the 46th Engineer Battalion)
- Company A, 46th Engineer Battalion
- 11th Patient Administration Detachment
- 485th Medical Detachment
- 31st Engineer Detachment (Concrete)
- 178th Vertical Engineer Company
- 209th Military Police Company
- 272nd Military Police Company
- 83rd Chemical Battalion
  - Headquarters and Headquarters Detachment, 83rd Chemical Battalion
  - 7th Chemical Company
  - 51st Chemical Company
  - 59th Chemical Company
- 88th Brigade Support Battalion
  - Headquarters and Headquarters Company, 88th Brigade Support Battalion
  - Alpha (Quartermaster) Company, 88th Brigade Support Battalion
  - Bravo (Maintenance) Company, 88th Brigade Support Battalion
  - 337th Signal Company
  - 546th Support Maintenance Company
- 142nd Combat Sustainment Support Battalion
  - Headquarters and Headquarters Company, 142nd Combat Sustainment Support Battalion
  - E Detachment, 18th Personnel Services Battalion
  - F Detachment, 18th Personnel Services Battalion
  - 126th Finance Detachment
  - 229th Quartermaster Company (Field Services)
  - 488th Quartermaster Company (Force Provider)
  - 585th Movement Control Team
  - 603rd Transportation Company

== Campaign streamers and decorations ==
Conflict	Streamer	Period	Orders
Operation Enduring Freedom	Consolidation II	2008–2009	Campaign Credit for deployment to Afghanistan from 12 June 2008 to 1 September 2009
Ribbon	Award	Period	Orders
Afghanistan 2008–2009	Meritorious Unit Commendation (Army)	2008–2009	Award of the Meritorious Unit Citation from June 2008 through September 2009
Defense Chemical, Biological, Radiological and Nuclear Response Force Mission	Superior Unit Award (Army)	2011–2013	US Army Superior Unit Award PO 350-09, 1 Oct 11 – 30 Sep 13

== Shoulder sleeve insignia ==
- Description: A rectangular shape device pointed at base 3 1/4 inches (8.26 cm) in height and 2 1/4 inches (5.72 cm) in width overall divided per pale golden yellow and teal blue, a silver gray sword palewise point down with a black hilt, on the hilt and upper portion of the blade is a scarlet fusil; all within a 1/8 inch (.32 cm) black border.
- Symbolism: Teal blue and yellow are associated with Branch Immaterial. Yellow/gold is also emblematic of excellence. Blue is for loyalty and red is for valor and sacrifice. The sword represents the power, honor, and wisdom of the warrior and the combat ready support of the unit. The diamond, epitomizing the essence of invincibility and the cutting edge, highlights the hardened bonds of courage, fidelity, and commitment to the Brigade. The two sections of the shield refer to the two missions to protect both the operational and tactical freedom actions of the supported Force.
- Background: The shoulder sleeve insignia was originally approved for the 1st Combat Support Brigade (Maneuver Enhancement) effective 16 September 2007. It was redesignated for the 1st Maneuver Enhancement Brigade on 1 February 2008. (TIOH Drawing Number A-1-931)

== Distinctive unit insignia ==
- Description: A gold color metal and enamel device 1 1/16 inches (2.70 cm) in height overall consisting of a sword palewise point down with a black hilt and white blade supporting a shield divided per pale teal blue and gold, on dexter side a red fusil and on the sinister, a teal blue fleur-de-lis; all between two gold laurel branches. Around the top is a black scroll inscribed with ENHANCING THE and around the bottom a black scroll inscribed WARRIOR SPIRIT in gold letters divided by the sword point.
- Symbolism: Teal blue is associated with Branch Immaterial and gold is emblematic of excellence and high ideals. Red is for sacrifice and valor. The sword represents the power, honor, and wisdom of the warrior and the combat ready support of the unit. The fleur-de-lis is for Louisiana where the Brigade was activated with its middle section resembling a spearhead denoting martial power and strength. The laurel symbolizes victory and a job well done. The two sections of the shield refer to the two missions to protect both the operational and tactical freedom actions of the supported Force. The diamond, epitomizing the essence of invincibility and the cutting edge, highlights the hardened bonds of courage, fidelity, and commitment to the Brigade.
- Background: The distinctive unit insignia was originally approved for the 1st Combat Support Brigade (Maneuver Enhancement) effective 16 September 2007. It was redesignated for the 1st Maneuver Enhancement Brigade on 1 February 2008. The insignia was amended to correct the height on 22 October 2008.
