= Shoulder sleeve insignia =

United States Army insignia

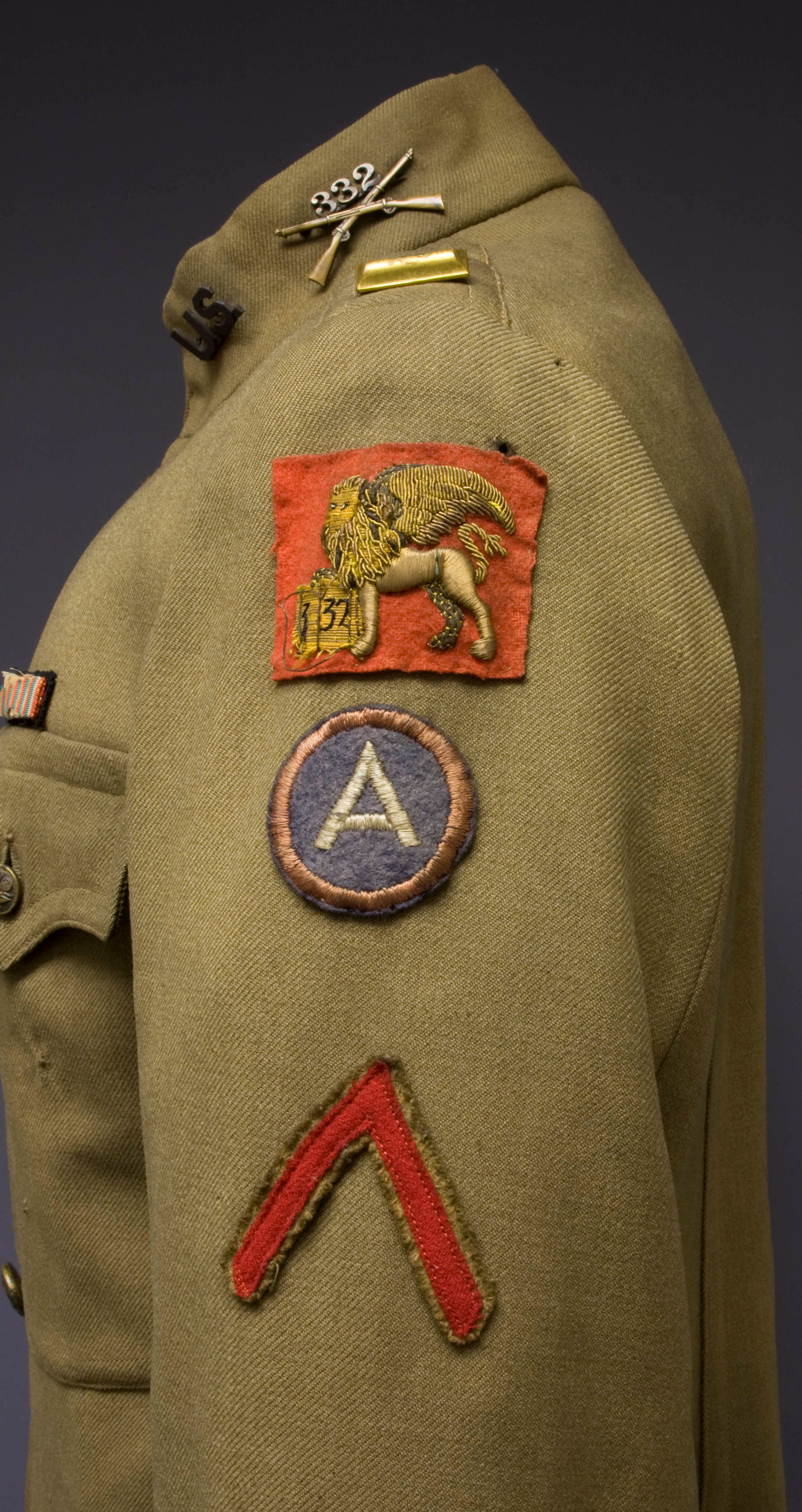
- 332d Infantry Regiment and Army of Occupation shoulder sleeve insignia worn on a World War I era U.S. infantry officer's coat
- Designer: United States Army
- Year: 1918–present
- Type: Patch
- Material: Cloth

Shoulder sleeve insignia (SSI) are embroidered cloth emblems worn on U.S. Army uniforms, primarily on the upper left sleeve, to identify the wearer’s current unit of assignment and lineage. When worn on the right sleeve, the insignia denotes prior participation in designated hostile conditions. Before the introduction of the current term, the right-sleeve version was officially designated Shoulder Sleeve Insignia – Former Wartime Service (SSI-FWTS); this designation was superseded by SSI-Military Operations in Hostile Conditions (SSI-MOHC) to reflect updated Department of the Army terminology. Informally, it is also known as a "combat patch". It signifies prior participation in combat or designated hostile environments with the represented unit. Authorization to wear SSI depends on the soldier’s unit and is governed by Department of the Army uniform regulations (such as Army Regulation 670-1), which specify the conditions under which patches may be worn.

== Versions and history ==
=== Earliest identifying devices ===
Corps badges were first used during the American Civil War as metal badges on caps or the uniform tunic. This continued during the Spanish-American War, but with different badges.

=== Colored shoulder-sleeve insignia ===
Early SSI were designed with bright colors and detailed symbols primarily for display on service or dress uniforms. During World War I, units such as the 81st Infantry Division began wearing colored SSI in combat zones, reflecting both practical identification needs and unit heritage. While the patches were initially primarily for identification, they quickly became a symbol of pride and unit affiliation.

In 1918, the 81st Infantry Division deployed to France after training at Camp Jackson, South Carolina. Its soldiers wore an olive drab felt patch featuring the silhouette of a wildcat named after Wildcat Creek, which ran through the training post. This patch, worn on the left shoulder, became the first officially recognized SSI in the U.S. Army. When challenged by other units, General John J. Pershing ruled in favor of the 81st's right to wear the patch and encouraged other divisions to develop their own insignia. The patch was officially adopted by the Army on October 19, 1918, establishing the precedent for shoulder sleeve insignia across the force.

Historically, full-color SSI were worn:

- On the 81st Infantry Division's uniform during World War I.
- On the brown service coat during World War II.
- On the green "Class A" uniform from the 1950s through the early 2000s.
- On the OG-107 utility uniforms during the late 1950s and 1960s.

They were also displayed on Military Police (MP) brassards, black or dark blue armbands with white "MP" lettering worn in garrison environments with both Class A and subdued field uniforms such as the Battle Dress Uniform or Desert Combat Uniform.

During this time, nearly all U.S. Army groups, field armies, corps, and divisions, as well as many major commands, had distinctive SSIs. These designs often contained symbolism relevant to the unit's origins, for example, the 82nd Airborne Division's "AA" for "All-American", and the 29th Infantry Division's blue-and-gray circle symbolizing its makeup of Union and Confederate states. Most units had unique patches, though armored divisions, the I Armored Corps, and the U.S. Army Armor Center used a shared triangular design with unit-specific numbers and, later, labels added to the patch.

With the transition to the Army Combat Uniform in the mid-2000s, and the eventual retirement of the Army Green Class A Uniform in 2015, full-color SSI were phased out. In their place, the Combat Service Identification Badge was introduced. It is a metal pin worn on the Army Service Uniform.

In recent years, the Army Green Service Uniform, commonly called the "pinks and greens", was reintroduced to reflect the WWII-era aesthetic. This uniform authorizes the return of full-color SSI on the left sleeve (ref: ALARACT 029/2021). Soldiers currently wear subdued SSI on combat uniforms when in the field or deployed and full-color SSI on the AGSU and combat uniforms when specified by regulation. The CSIB remains in use on the blue ASU, but it is not worn on the AGSU or AGSU Class B shirt.

=== Subdued ===
Subdued Shoulder Sleeve Insignia were developed to ensure uniform concealment and soldier survivability in field and combat environments. These patches are produced in low-contrast, camouflage-matching colors and have evolved alongside the Army's field uniforms.

- Type III OG-107 Olive Drab subdued SSI (1966–1980s)

The OG-107 Olive Drab fatigues were in use during the Vietnam War. At the beginning of the conflict, soldiers went to war with full-color insignia, white name tapes and black and gold US Army tapes. But in 1966, the Army authorized subdued or green and black versions of the SSI patches to be worn instead.

- BDU-era subdued SSI (1980s–2008)

The Battle Dress Uniform (BDU) was the standard field uniform from the early 1980s until it was fully phased out in 2008. To match the BDU's woodland camouflage, subdued SSI were created in olive drab, dark brown, and black. These patches were sewn onto the uniform. These versions are now obsolete, in accordance with the retirement of the BDU.

- DBCU / DCU-era subdued SSI (1990s–2008)

The Desert Battle Dress Uniform (DCBU) "chocolate-chips" and its successor the Desert Camouflage Uniform (DCU) were used primarily during Operations Desert Shield/Desert Storm, Operation Gothic Serpent, early Middle East tensions and the initial stages of Operation Enduring Freedom, and Iraqi Freedom. During this period, subdued SSI were manufactured in light tan and coyote brown thread to match the desert color palette. Like their BDU counterparts, these patches were sewn on and have since been retired with the discontinuation of the DCU around 2008.

- UCP/ACU-era subdued SSI (2005 — 2019)

With the rollout of the Army Combat Uniform (ACU) and Universal Camouflage Pattern (UCP) in 2005, subdued SSI were reimagined with new color schemes: foliage green, gray, and black, occasionally incorporating maroon or red for units with distinctive branch colors (e.g., medical or artillery). These were the first Army-issued SSI designed with hook-and-loop backing, aligning with the ACU's modular configuration and shoulder loop fields. This allowed for easier removal, reassignment, and replacement, a significant shift from previously sewn-on insignia.

- OCP-era subdued SSI (2015–present)

The Operational Camouflage Pattern (OCP), derived from Crye Precision's MultiCam, replaced UCP in 2015 and is now the standard combat uniform. Current SSI are designed in bagby green, spice brown, and tan, with no foliage green. They retain hook-and-loop fasteners and are worn on the left sleeve to denote current unit assignment, and optionally on the right sleeve as SSI-MOHC to indicate combat service with that unit or previous units to which they were assigned in a combat zone.

== Wear and SSI-MOHC ==
The shoulder sleeve insignia is worn on the left sleeve of the U.S. Army uniform to identify a soldier's current unit of assignment. On combat uniforms such as the Army Combat Uniform and Operational Camouflage Pattern uniform, the SSI is attached to a hook-and-loop field on the upper arm, just below the shoulder seam.

When a standard SSI placement is obscured by equipment such as body armor, units may follow supplemental guidance to display the SSI on alternative locations approved by commander's policy or uniform regulations (for example, on shoulder straps or helmet covers). Certain units, such as the 3rd Infantry Division and the 101st Airborne Division, have authorized wear of the SSI on helmet covers for unit identification.

The specific SSI worn depends on the soldier’s assignment and the relevant unit’s standard operating procedures, with soldiers generally wearing the insignia of their assigned division, corps, or separate brigade. If the soldier's unit falls under the operational control of a higher headquarters with a distinct SSI, they may be required to wear that higher headquarters' patch. For example, First Army directs all subordinate brigades under its command to wear the First Army SSI as a unit patch, regardless of the brigade's organic insignia.

=== Shoulder Sleeve Insignia - military operations in hostile conditions ===
The US Army's first official combat patch, or Shoulder Sleeve Insignia – Military Operations in Hostile Conditions (SSI-MOHC), was authorized at the end of World War II to denote service in combat against hostile forces. The practice of wearing unit patches on the right sleeve to signify combat experience became official in 1945. While unit patches had been used before, this was the first instance of a specific patch to denote combat service. Soldiers who have participated in military operations in designated combat or hostile fire zones are authorized to wear the SSI of the unit they served with on their right shoulder. This insignia, officially designated as the Shoulder Sleeve Insignia-Military Operations in Hostile Conditions (SSI-MOHC) or formerly known as the Shoulder Sleeve Insignia-Former Wartime Service (SSI-FWTS), is commonly referred to as a combat patch and represents former wartime service.

There is no minimum time-in-theater requirement to qualify for the SSI-MOHC. The only requirements to obtain or earn one are to serve in a hostile fire pay/imminent danger pay, combat zone tax exclusion pay or in a combat zone. If eligible for more than one SSI–MOHC, a soldier may alternate between them but may not wear more than one at a time. Orders are not issued for authorization of combat patches like in previous years when it was issued alongside a notice of authorization. In some cases, units produce patch certificates as a ceremonial gesture.

Previous and current authorized patch combat zones per AR 670-1-21-18c
Operation/theater	Dates authorized (inclusive)	Eligibility/notes
World War II	7 December 1941 — 2 September 1946	U.S. Army units; USMC personnel 15 March 1943 —2 September 1946 May wear SSI-MOHC for Marine unit.
Korean War	27 June 1950 — 27 July 1954	All assigned soldiers
Korea (Additional)	1 April 1968 — 31 August 1973	Only for personnel with Purple Heart, CIB, CMB, or at least one month of hostile fire pay in Korea.
Vietnam War	1 July 1958 - 28 March 1973	All assigned soldiers
Dominican Civil War	29 April 1965 — 21 September 1966	Authorized SSI: XVIII Airborne Corps, 82nd Airborne Division, 5th Logistical Command; others wear Organization of American States (OAS/OEA) SSI.
Invasion of Grenada	24 October 1983 — 21 November 1983	Multiple units listed (XVIII Airborne Corps, 82nd Airborne Division, 101st Airborne, Rangers, etc.).
Lebanon	9 August 1983 — 24 April 1984	Soldiers in Field Artillery School Target Acquisition Battery or 214th Field Artillery Brigade attached to USMC in Beirut.
Panmunjom firefight	23 November 1984	Soldiers who directly participated in firefight with North Korean guards at the Joint Security Area.
Operation Earnest Will	27 July 1987 — 1 August 1990	Soldiers assigned/attached/Operational Control to units supporting Earnest Will; must be eligible for Armed Forces Expeditionary Medal and imminent danger pay (IDP).
Operation Just Cause	20 December 1989 — 31 January 1990	Soldiers in listed units or Operational Control; others wear parent unit SSI or U.S. Army South SSI.
Operation Desert Shield/Desert Storm	17 January 1991 — 31 August 1993	Soldiers assigned/attached/Operational Control to units supporting Desert Storm; IDP required; includes Joint Task Forces Patriot Defender, etc.
El Salvador	1 January 1981 — 1 February 1992	Personnel who participated in El Salvador operations.
Somalia	1 January 2004 — present	Soldiers deployed to Somalia under USCENTCOM or AFRICOM with combat zone tax exclusion and hostile fire/IDP.
Operation Restore Hope	5 December 1992 — 31 March 1995	Soldiers in Operation Restore Hope/Continue Hope/United Shield.
Operation Enduring Freedom	11 September 2001 — present	Soldiers deployed in Afghanistan, Pakistan, Tajikistan, Turkmenistan, Uzbekistan; Philippines from 2002; Djibouti from 2008. OEF is still used as a code for deployments.
Operation Iraqi Freedom	19 March 2003 — 31 August 2010	Soldiers in USCENTCOM AOR or supporting countries; 1st Marine Division (March–April 2003) allowed.
Operation New Dawn	1 September 2010 — 31 December 2011	Soldiers assigned to units participating in OND in USCENTCOM AOR or supporting countries.
Operation Inherent Resolve	15 June 2014 — present	Soldiers deployed to Iraq, Jordan, Syria, Saudi Arabia supporting OIR with combat zone tax exclusion and hostile fire/IDP.
Operation Freedom's Sentinel	1 January 2015 — 30 August 2021	Soldiers deployed to Afghanistan, Pakistan, Yemen, Djibouti supporting OFS with combat zone tax exclusion and hostile fire/IDP.
Operation Epic Fury	28 February 2026 — to be determined	Soldiers supporting operations tied to the conflict with Iran in areas under US Central Command and US Africa Command
Future operations or notices	Designated by combatant commanders	Requests for SSI–MOHC wear must be approved by Chief of Staff of the Army (CSA). Most recent with the release of ALARACT 069/2025 for the countries of Kuwait, Bahrain, Qatar, UAE, Oman and Egypt.

In the early phases of the Global War on Terrorism, soldiers sometimes received multiple combat patches due to changing command relationships during deployments. However, policy changed on March 27, 2007, to limit eligibility to a single SSI–MOHC per deployment. Under current policy, soldiers are authorized to wear the insignia of the lowest echelon unit (company level or above) with its own distinctive SSI (usually a brigade), with which they were assigned or attached in a combat zone. This change was meant to simplify patch entitlement and eliminate overlapping authorizations from multiple command levels.

While all U.S. Army groups, field armies, and corps have their own shoulder sleeve insignia, combat patches are generally not awarded to all soldiers serving under those commands. Only personnel assigned to or directly supporting the corps or army headquarters are typically authorized to wear those insignia as SSI–MOHC.

During the Israel-Hamas War and the Iran-Israel War, the US Army announced through ALARACT 069/2025 that from the dates of 7 October 2023 to 24 June 2025, all US Army Units from Active Duty, National Guard and the Reserves are authorized a SSI-MOHC Patch due to the increasing hostilities in the region of CENTCOM and AFRICOM and the ballistic missile attack on Qatar. This is a rare move as the SSI-MOHC, formerly known as SSI-FWTS or the "combat patch", has almost always been an earned item to those serving in regions that qualify one for hostile fire pay/imminent danger pay, CZTE, and in recognized combat zones, which are currently Iraq, Syria, Jordan, Saudi Arabia, Pakistan, Yemen, Lebanon, Israel, Sinai Peninsula and Djibouti.

The 81st Infantry Division "Wildcat" insignia; the first approved SSI.

1st Armored Corps insignia.

1st Armored Division insignia showing division nickname.

4th Armored Division insignia. The division chose not to add a nickname as befit their motto: Name Enough!

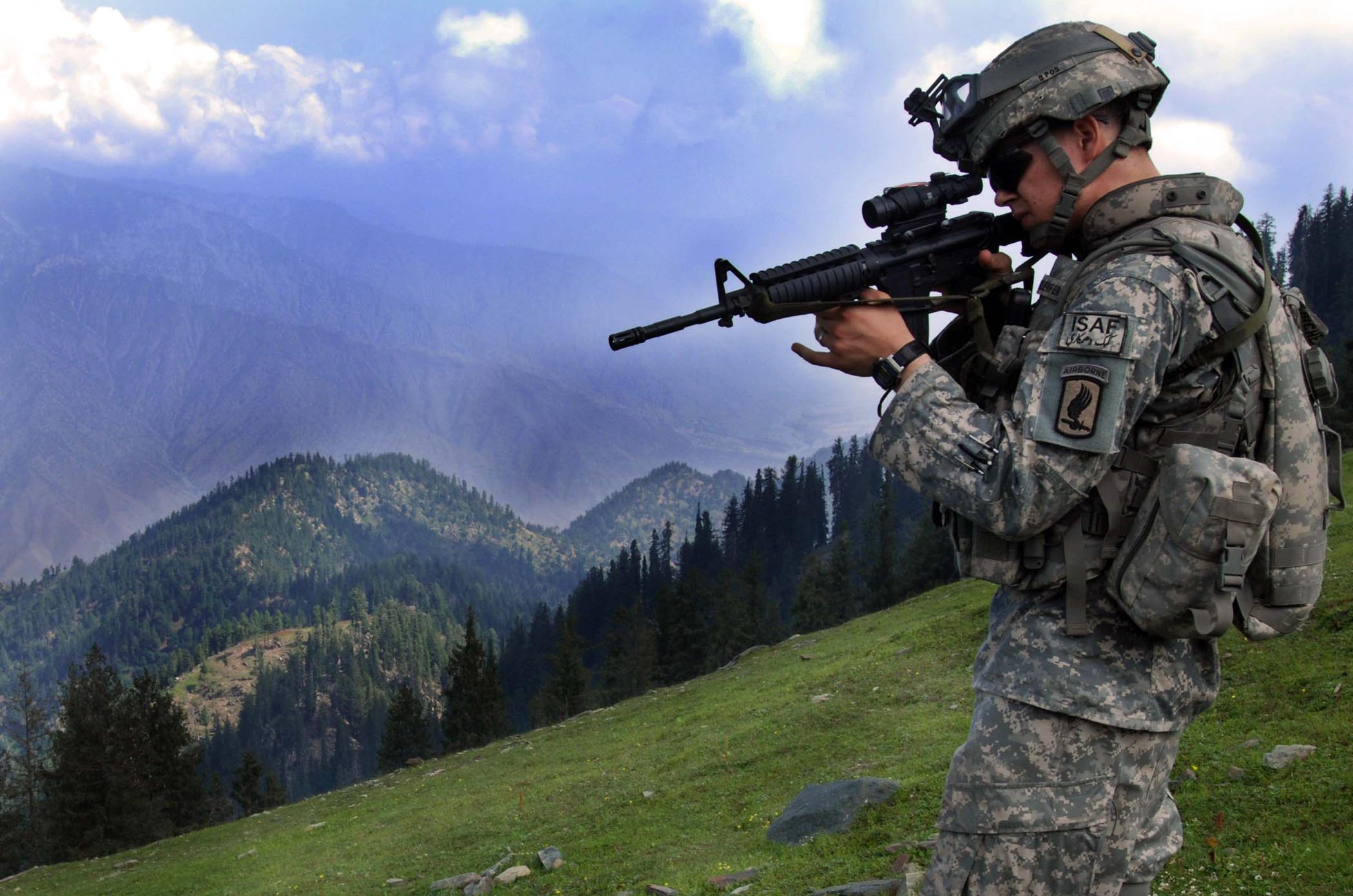
A soldier wears the 173rd Airborne Brigade Combat Team SSI on his ACU uniform while serving in Afghanistan

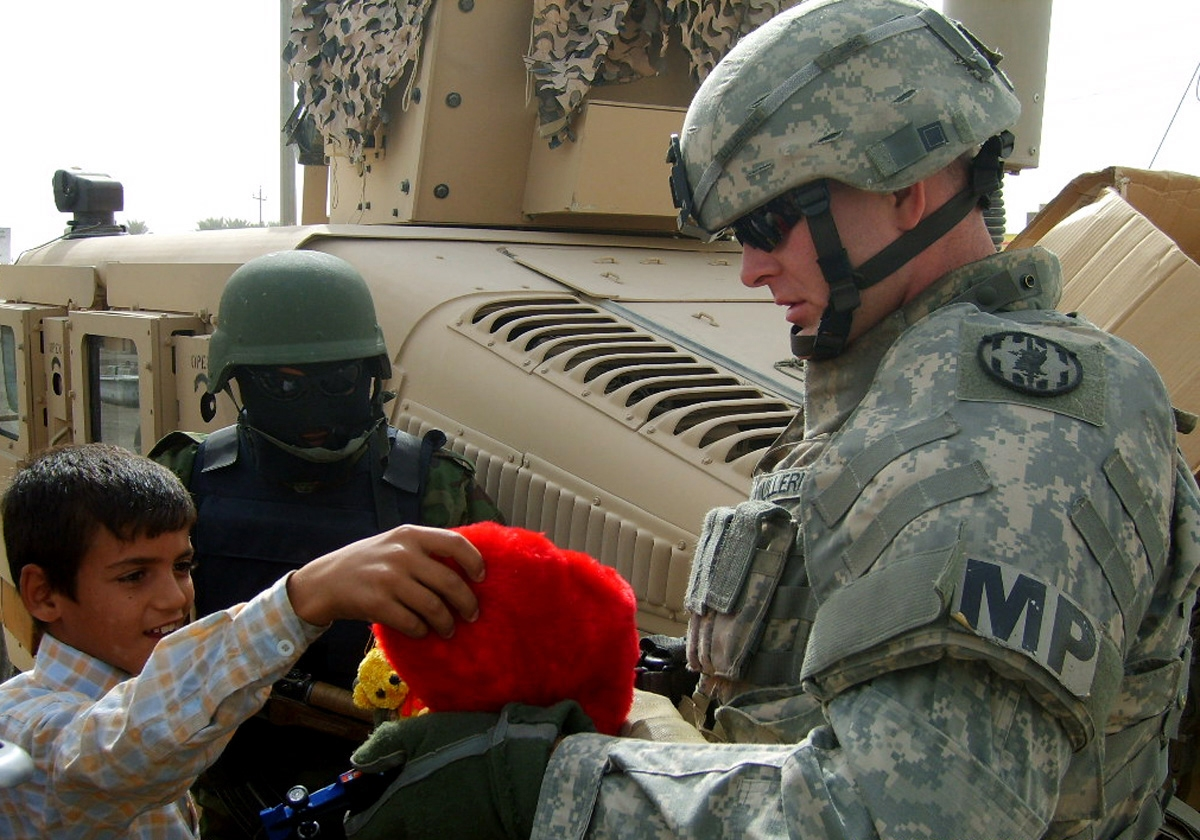
A soldier with the SSI of the 89th Military Police Brigade on his Interceptor Body Armor shoulder pad.

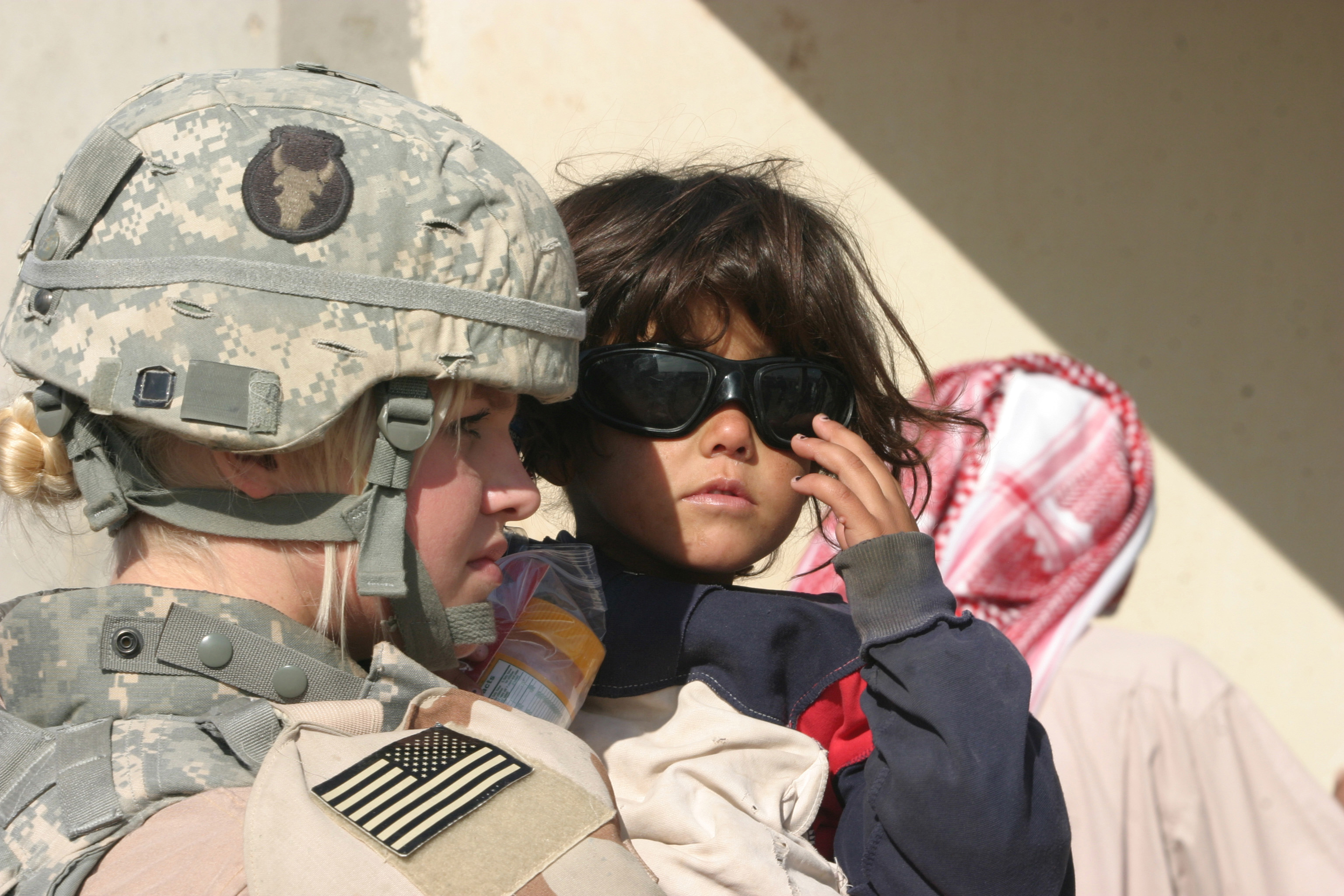
A soldier with the SSI of the 34th Infantry Division on her MICH TC-2000 Combat Helmet.

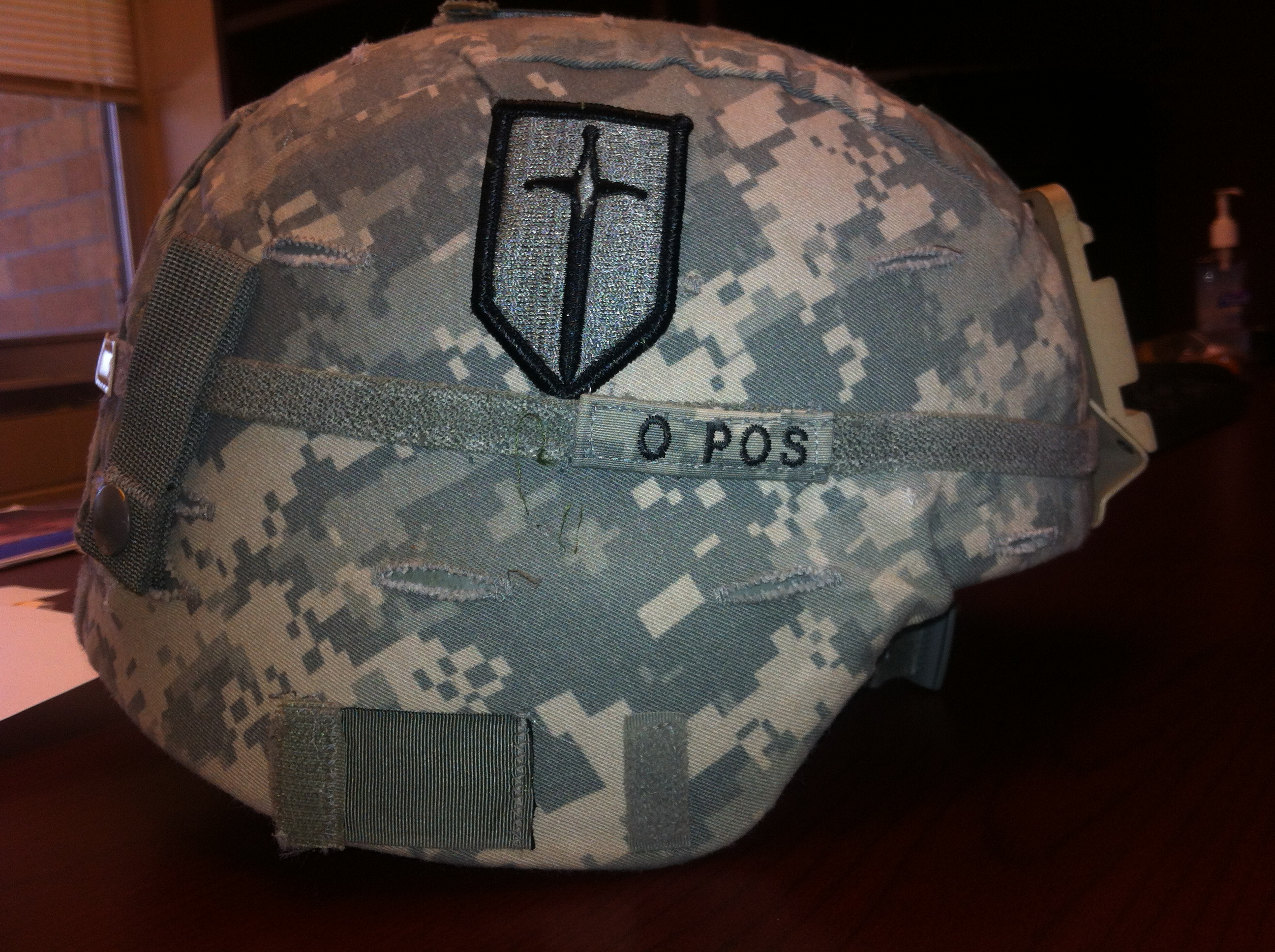
Half scale insignia of the 1st Maneuver Enhancement Brigade worn on the right side of an Advanced Combat Helmet.

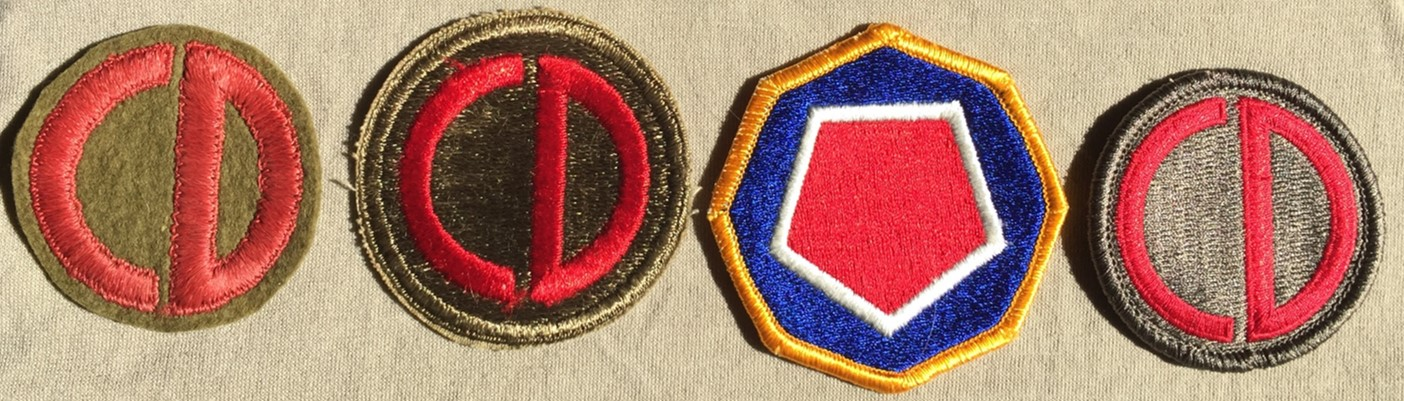
SSI for the 85th Infantry Division. WWI, WWII, 1970–1986, and present

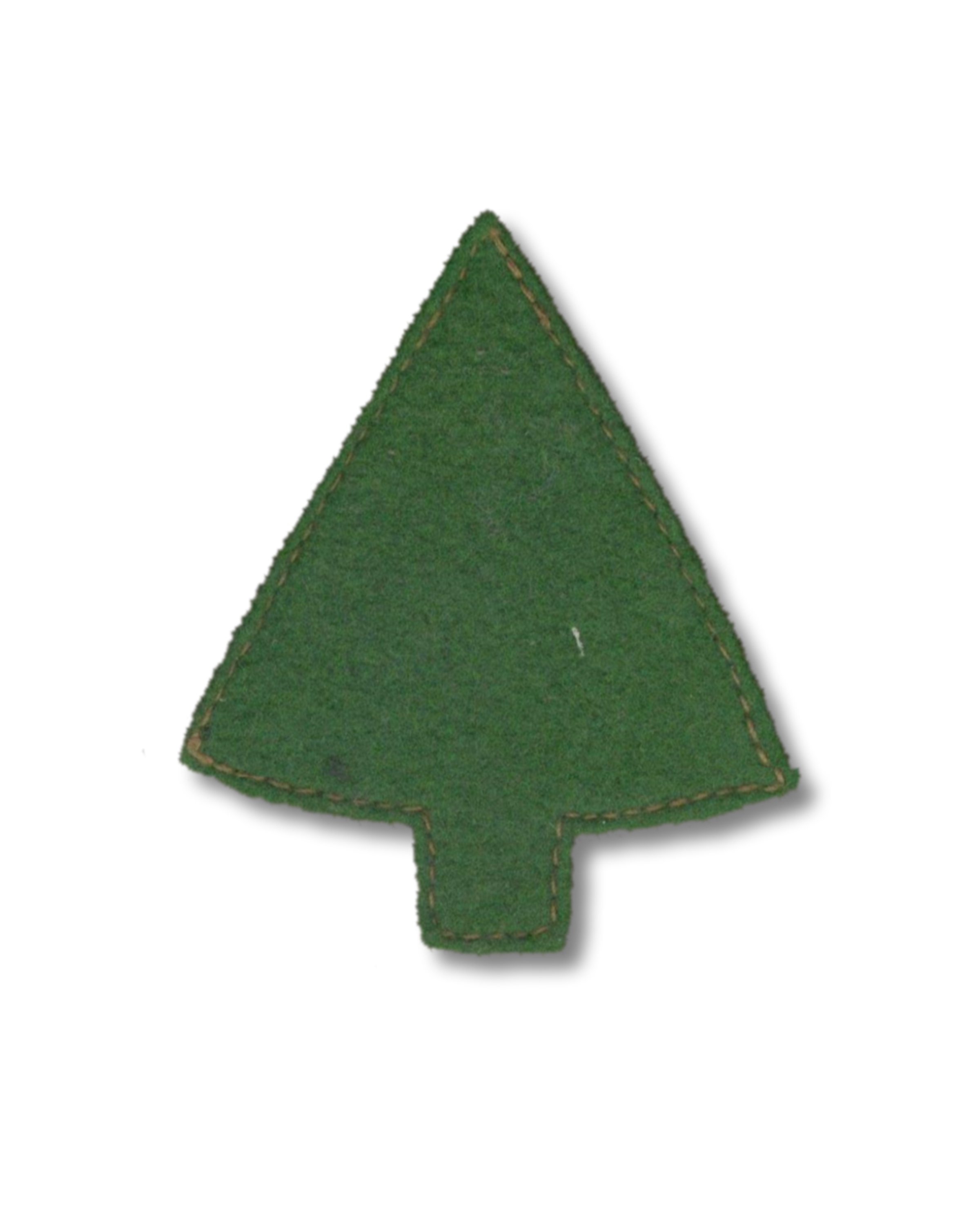
SSI for the 91st Infantry Division in World War II

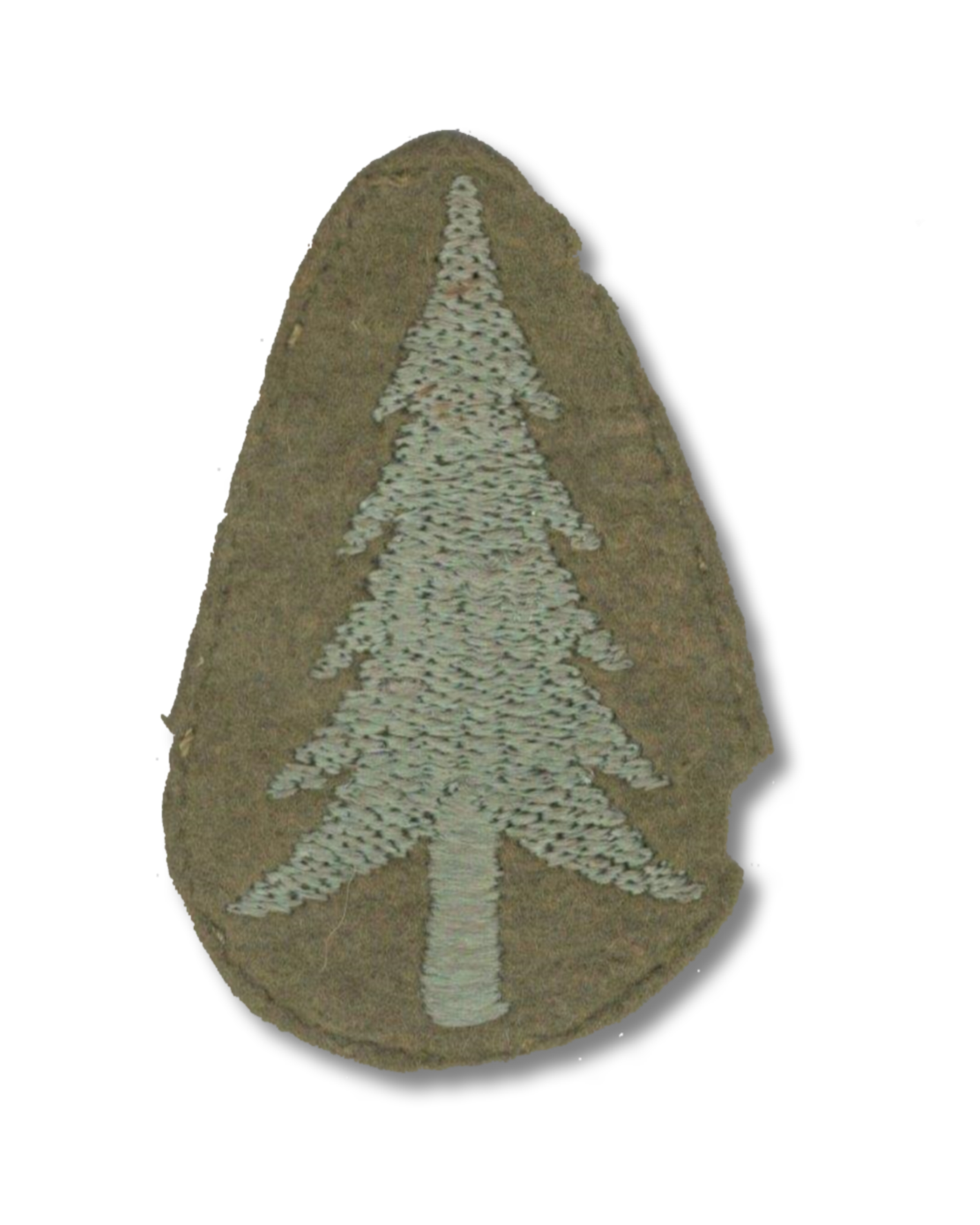
Variation SSI for the 91st Infantry Division in World War II

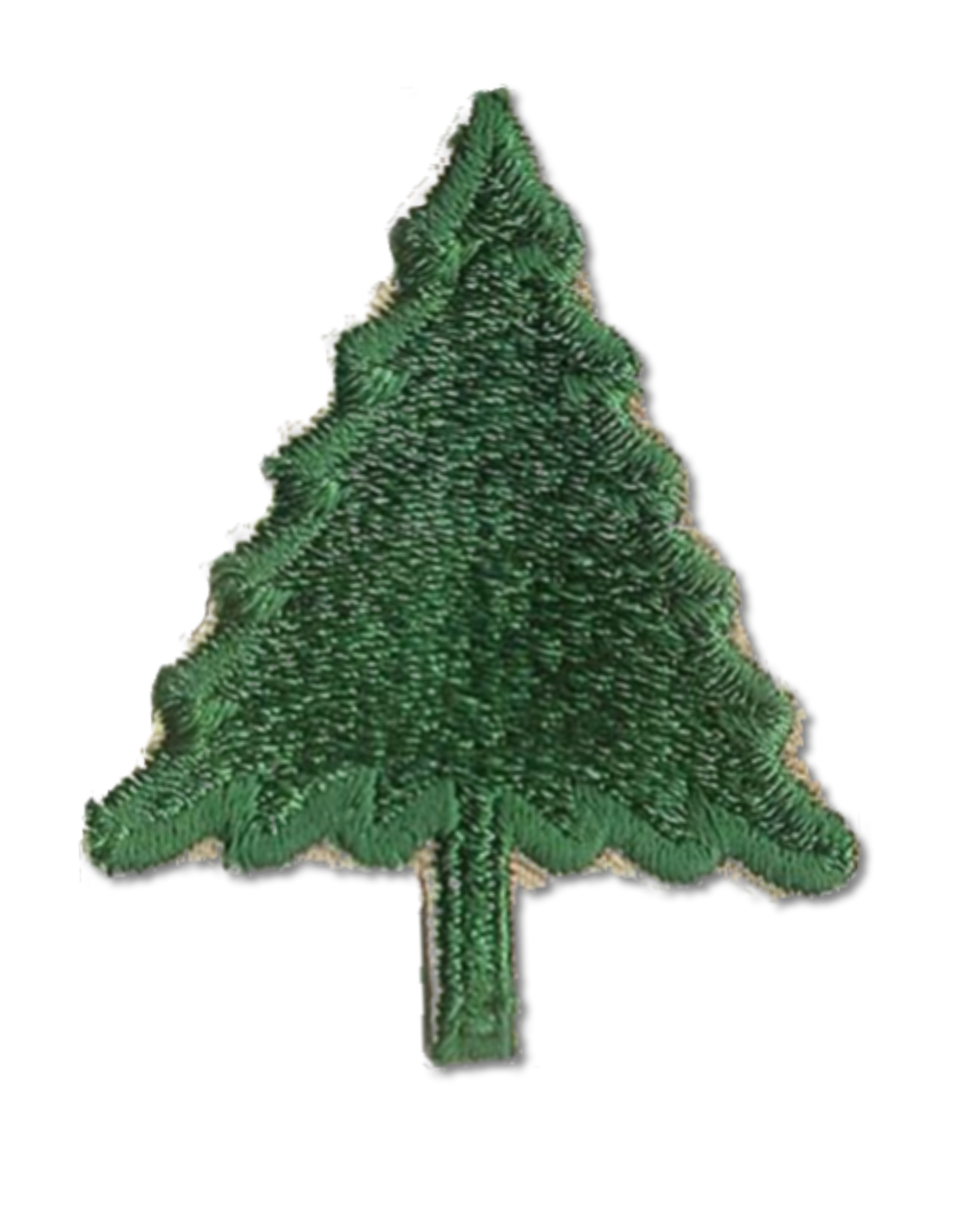
SSI for the 91st Infantry Division in World War II

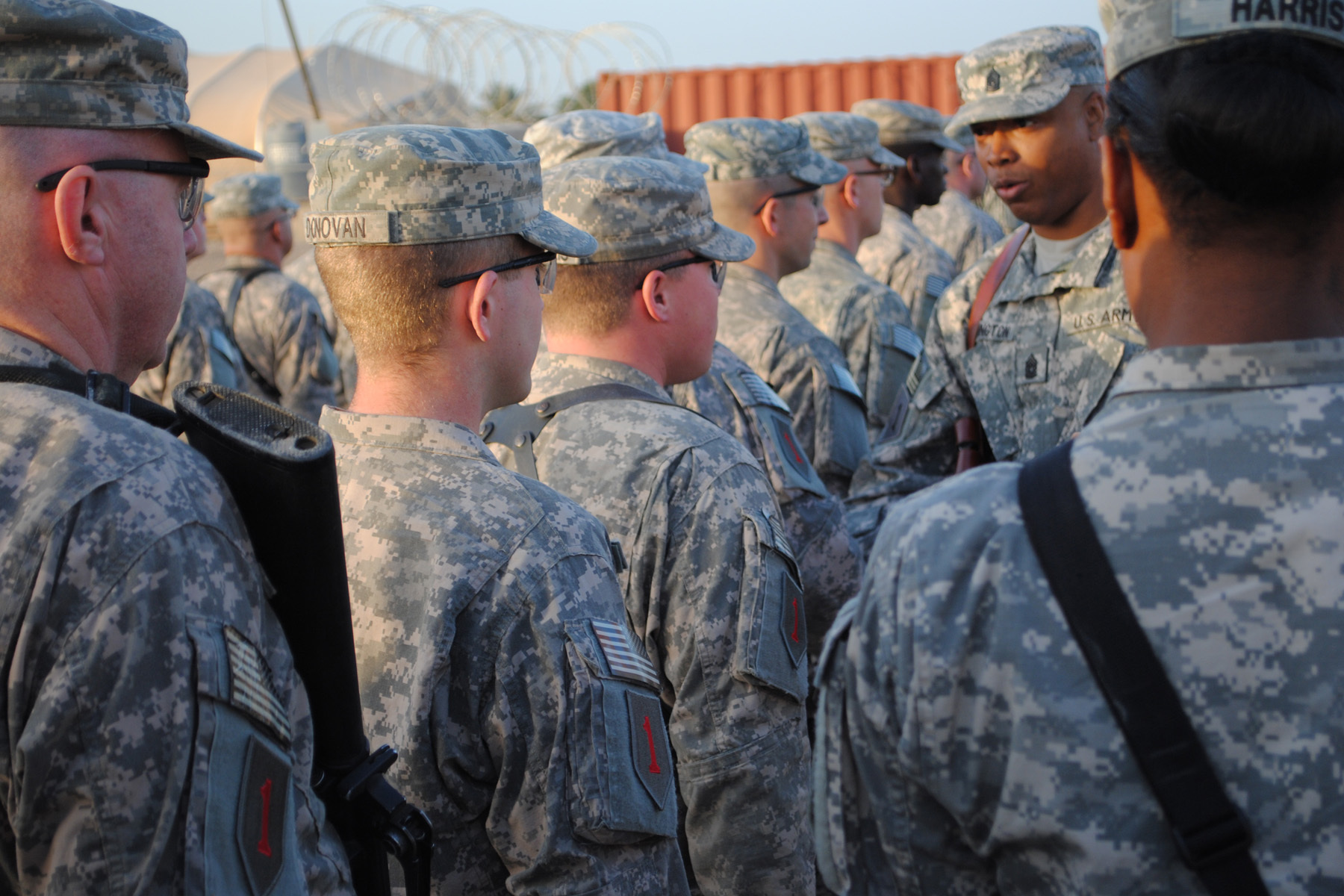
Soldiers with the 94th Military Police Company, Special Troops Battalion, 2nd Advise and Assist Brigade, 1st Infantry Division, places a 1st Infantry Division shoulder sleeve insignia – former wartime service at Camp Liberty, Iraq.

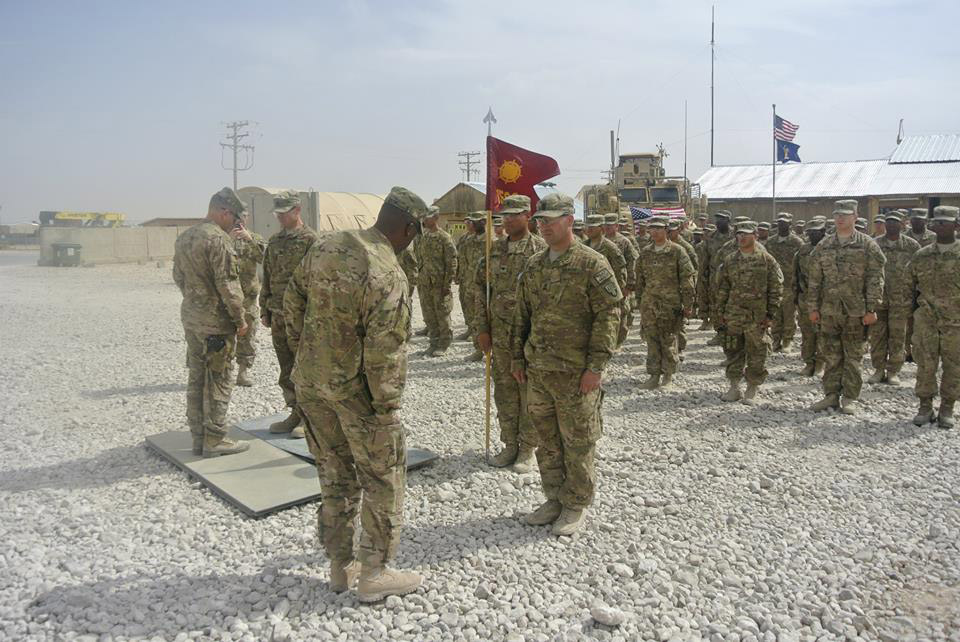
New York Army National Guard Soldiers of the 1569th Transportation Corps celebrate their "patch ceremony" on June 6, 2014 in Afghanistan.

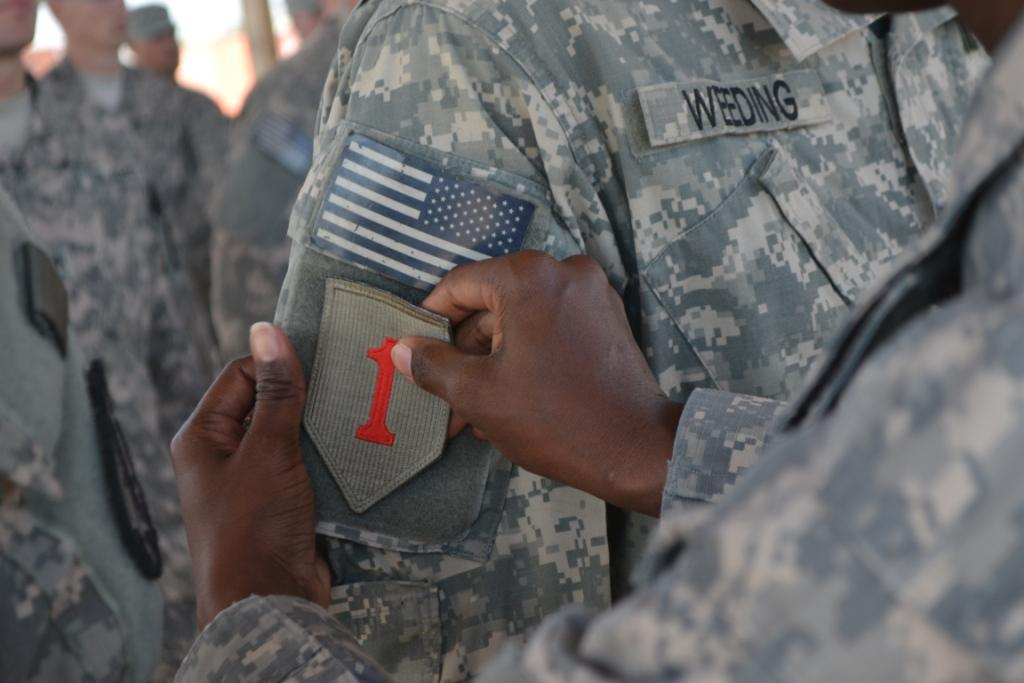

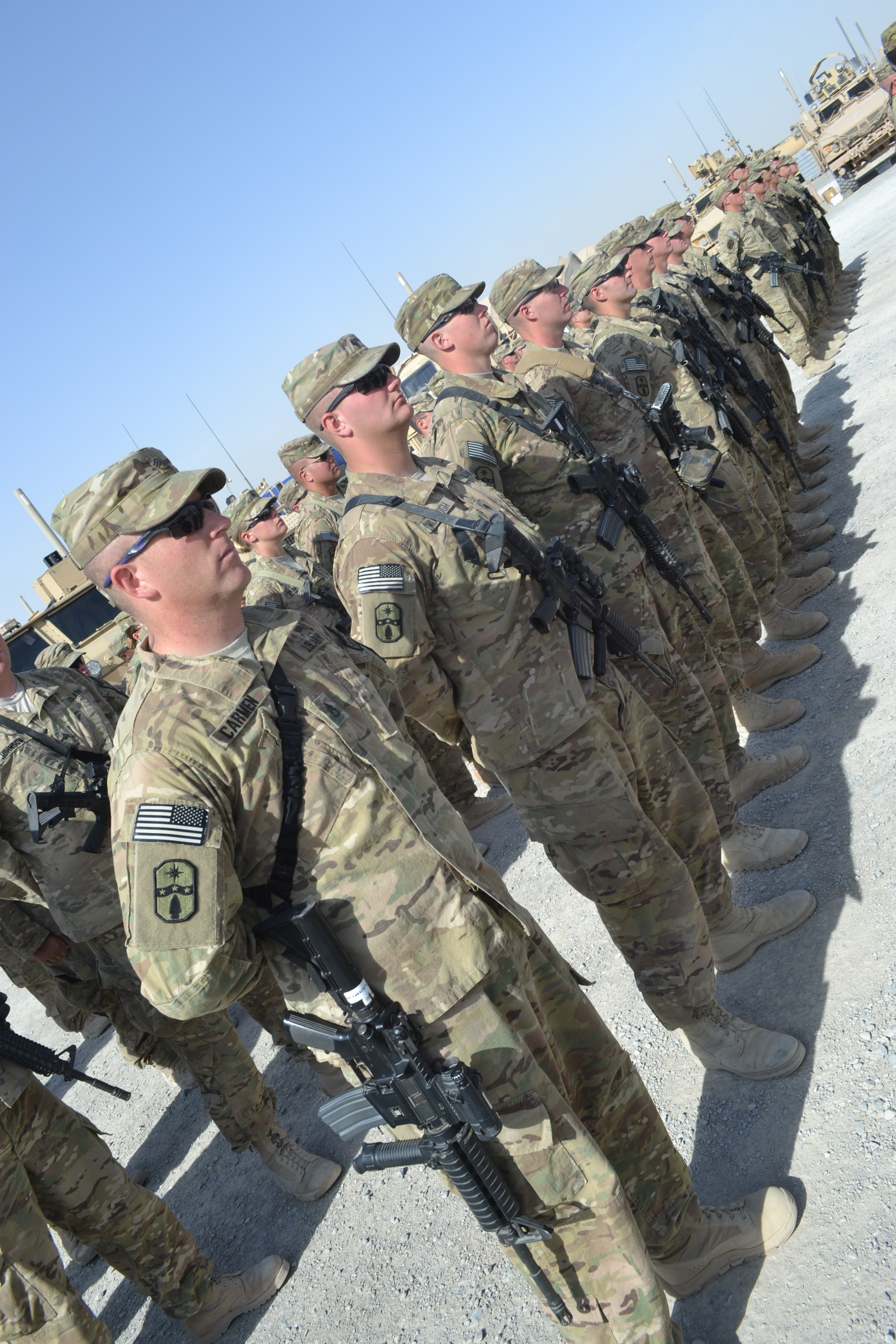
Soldiers with the 1487th Transportation Company-Ohio National Guard earn the Shoulder Sleeve Insignia Former Wartime Service, April 28, at Kandahar Airfield, Afghanistan.

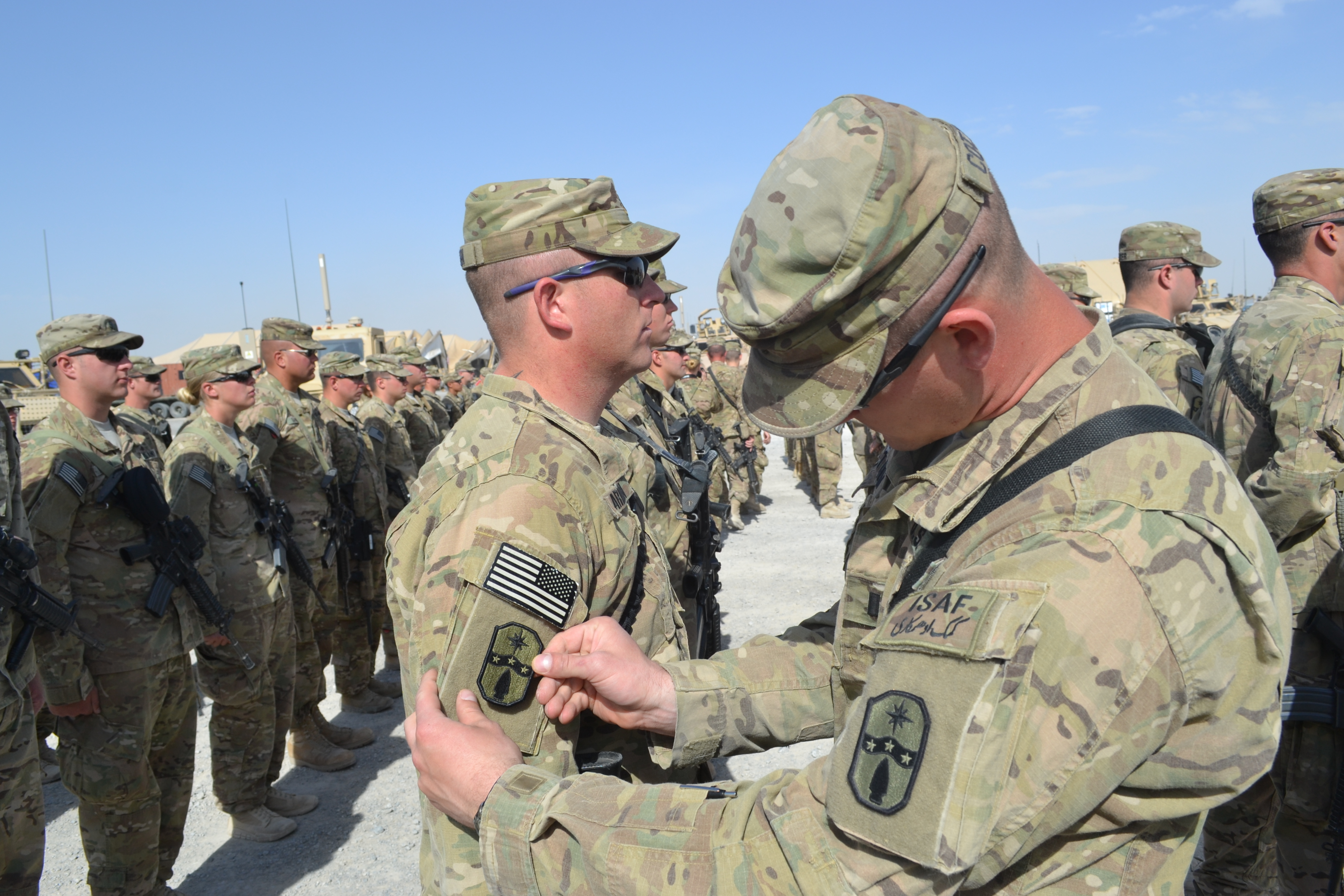
Soldiers with the 1487th Transportation Company-Ohio National Guard earn the Shoulder Sleeve Insignia Former Wartime Service, April 28, at Kandahar Airfield, Afghanistan.

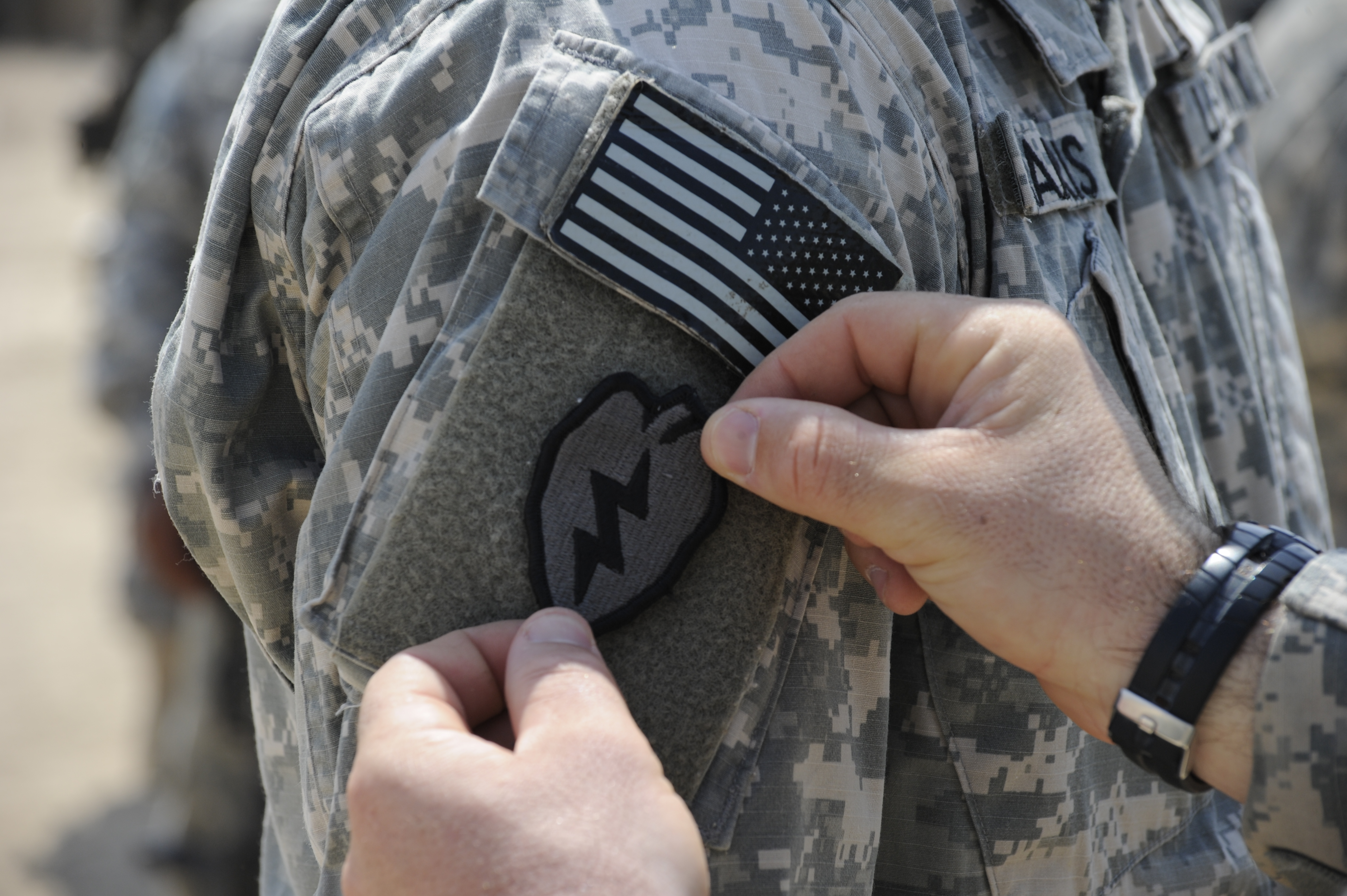
U.S. Army Sgt. Ashanti Harris, assigned to 1st Battalion, 21st Infantry Regiment, 2nd Advise and Assist Brigade, 25th Infantry Division, receives a combat patch from U.S. Army Lt. Philip Riglick, assigned to 1st Battalion, 21st Infantry Regiment, 2nd Advise and Assist Brigade, 25th Infantry Division, at Forward Operating Base Warhorse, Diyala province, Iraq, Aug. 21, 2010.

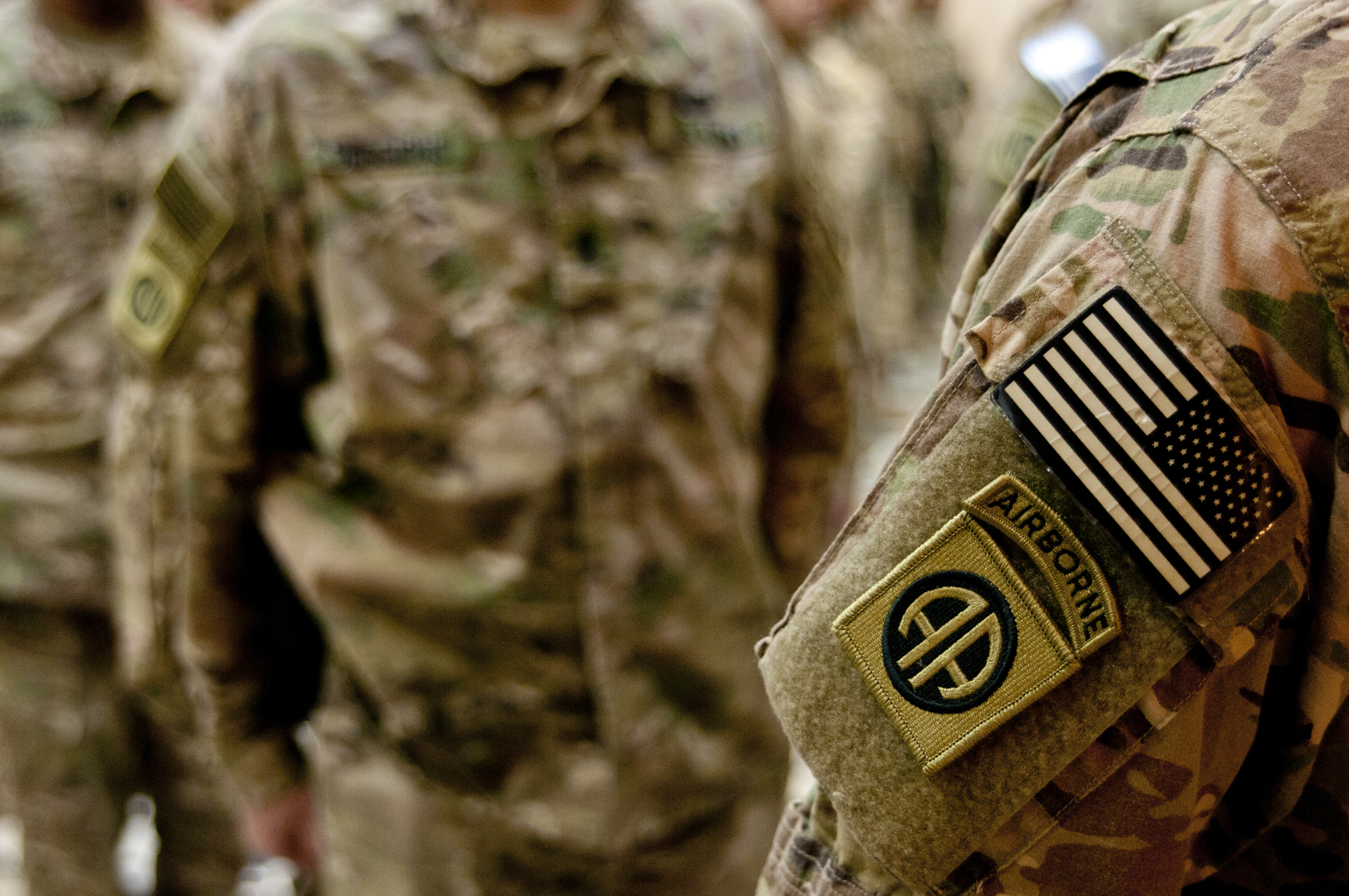
A paratrooper assigned to the 82nd Airborne Division displays his newly-awarded Shoulder Sleeve Insignia-former wartime service patch during a ceremony in Baghdad, Iraq, July 4, 2015

== See also ==
- Distinctive unit insignia
- Combat Service Identification Badge
- Emblems of the United States Air Force
- Divisional insignia of the British Army
- Formation badges for the British Army equivalent
- Tactical recognition flash
- US Army Institute of Heraldry

=== Shoulder Sleeve Insignia Galleries ===
- Field army insignia of the United States Army
- Corps insignia of the United States Army
- Division insignia of the United States Army
- Brigade insignia of the United States Army
- Miscellaneous Shoulder Sleeve Insignia of the United States Army
