= United States Army Recruiting and Retention College =

United States Army Recruiting and Retention College (RRC)
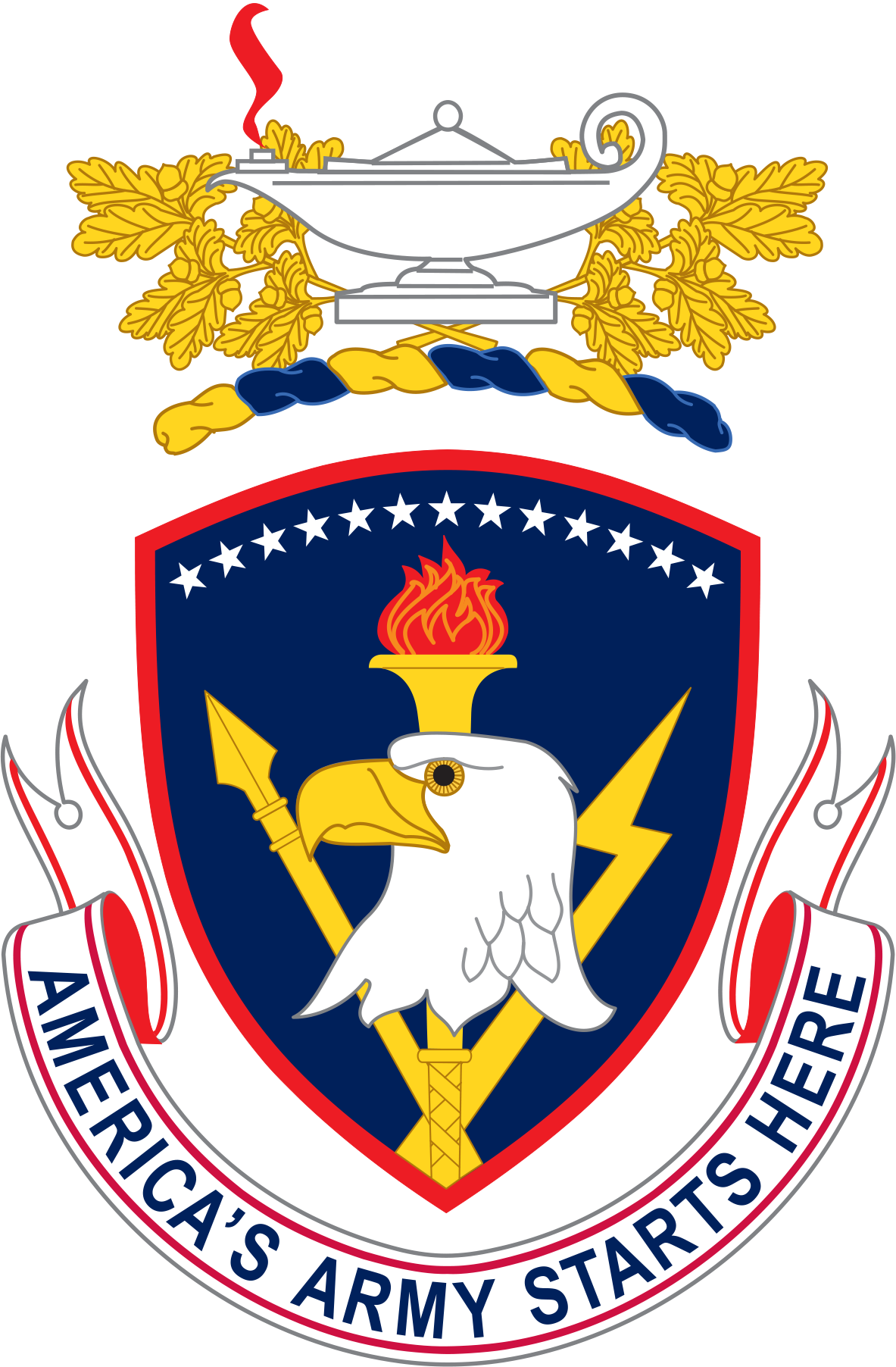
- Active: July 1, 1983 - Present
- Country: United States of America
- Branch: United States Army
- Type: Military Education and Training
- Role: Recruiting and Retention
- Part of: United States Army Soldier Support Institute (USASSI); United States Army Recruiting Command
- Garrison/HQ: Fort Knox, Kentucky
- Mottos: "America's Army Starts Here" "Docendo Discimus" (We Learn By Teaching)
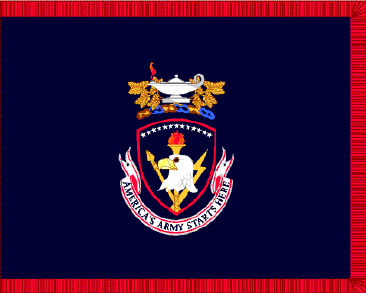
- Unit Colors
- Website: recruiting.army.mil/RRC/

Commanders
- Commandant: Col. Kirk Duncan
- Command Sergeant Major: Command Sgt. Maj. Scott Wolfe
- Dean/Chief Academic Officer: Susan Troendle, EdD

The United States Army Recruiting and Retention College (RRC), located at Fort Knox, Kentucky, is a satellite school under the United States Army Soldier Support Institute (USASSI) that provides United States Army officers and non-commissioned officers (NCOs) with the knowledge, skills, and techniques to conduct recruiting and career counselor duties for the United States Army and Army Reserve at the company, battalion, brigade, and headquarters levels.

== History ==
=== Fort Benjamin Harrison and Fort Jackson ===
With the creation of the U.S. Army Recruiting Command (USAREC) in October 1967, the teaching of the Army's recruiting and retention personnel was conducted by instructors from the United States Army Adjutant General School at Fort Benjamin Harrison, Indiana. On July 1, 1983, the United States Army Recruiting and Retention School (RRS) was activated at Fort Benjamin Harrison as the fifth Army school under the United States Army Institute of Personnel and Resource Management (USAIPRM). In August 1984, the Army reorganized USAIPRM as the USASSI where it would oversee eight schools responsible for the training of all Army personnel, finance, music, and recruiting and retention Soldiers.

In April 1991, the United States Congress approved the 1991 Base Realignment and Closure Commission list, with Fort Benjamin Harrison recommended for closure and units located there moved to other military bases. By October 1995, USASSI and its associated schools had relocated to Fort Jackson, South Carolina, where they continued to train thousands of Soldiers annually for nearly 20 years.

=== Fort Knox ===
In March 2014, the Army directed the RRS to be reassigned as a brigade under USAREC and relocated to Fort Knox, Kentucky, in order to improve synergy and communication between USAREC headquarters and the RRS and increase the speed that recruiting doctrine and training curriculum was developed and implemented. The move was projected to save the Army more than $14 million per year in training and travel costs by repurposing the headquarters buildings and barracks previously used by the deactivated 3d Brigade Combat Team, 1st Infantry Division into a new campus for the RRS.

The relocation process began in July 2014 with instructors and civilian personnel beginning to move or be assigned to Fort Knox, and courses being taught at both Fort Knox and Fort Jackson. By January 2015 all courses had been moved to Fort Knox, and the RRS was formally activated as USAREC's seventh brigade on October 1, 2015; its Headquarters Company was activated one year later on October 1, 2016, to provide better mission command support to the Soldiers and civilians working at the RRS. On October 1, 2017, the RRS was reflagged as the United States Army Recruiting and Retention College (RRC) as part of its incorporation under the Army University system, which integrated all of the Army's professional military education institutions under a single educational structure modeled after many civilian university systems.

=== Return to USASSI ===
On October 1, 2024, the RRC was reassigned back under the USASSI as part of the recommended changes to the Army accession systems and processes made by the Army Recruiting and Retention Task Force, which included the creation of two new Army MOSs, Talent Acquisition Specialist (42T) for enlisted Soldiers and Talent Acquisition Technician (420T) for warrant officers, that are being taught at the RRC and will eventually replace the current Recruiter (79R) MOS and end detailed recruiting assignments for Soldiers. The RRC co-developed the training courses for the new MOSs in conjunction with training developers at USASSI and serves as the lead agency for the training and development of the 42T and 420T students.

== Accreditation ==
The RRC is one of 27 Army Centers of Excellence (CoE), Colleges, and Schools under the Army University system and is accredited by the United States Army Training and Doctrine Command (TRADOC) Quality Assurance Office to provide military education and issue diplomas and transcripts to military and civilian students. It is one of only 45 U.S. military and government training institutions to earn civilian accreditation from the Council on Occupational Education (CoE).

Courses at the RRC have been evaluated by the American Council on Education (ACE) for awarding of civilian college credit hours towards undergraduate degrees and certificates based on ACE guidelines, and the RRC has Continuing Education Degree Program agreements with several colleges and universities to provide course graduates with accelerated degree plans and college credit hours towards associate's, bachelor's, and master's degrees from those institutions.

== Campus ==
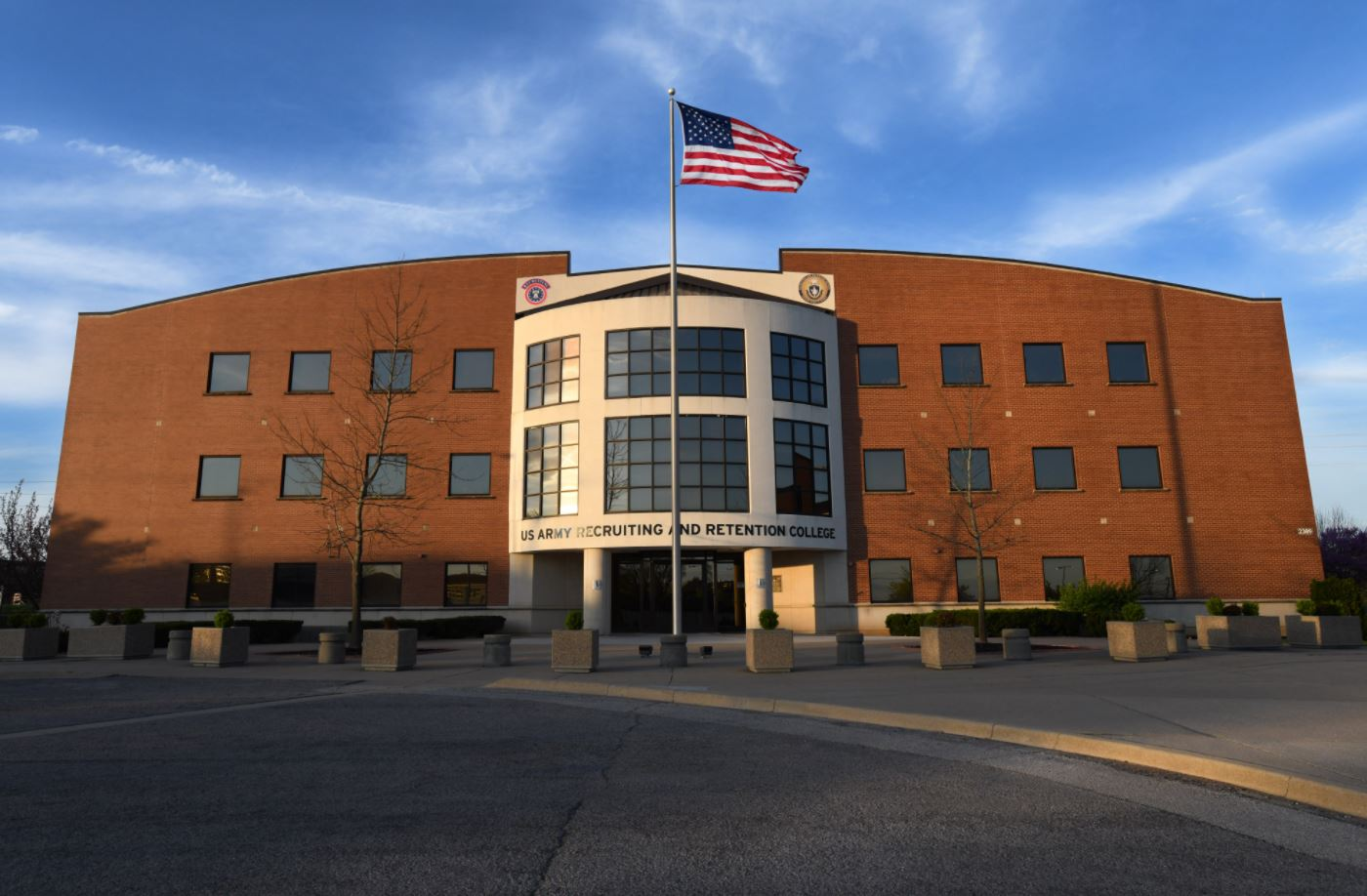
Tempesta Hall, United States Army Recruiting and Retention College

The RRC campus consists of 11 buildings located on approximately 80 acres (326,987 m^{2}) at Fort Knox, Kentucky, which house the executive, academic, and administrative offices, classrooms, and student housing, as well as three support facilities that provide dining, physical fitness and recreational activities. The campus layout provides students with an under 10-minute walk between their housing, classrooms, dining, physical fitness, and recreation, thus reducing the need for a vehicle while attending. Several campus buildings are named after historic people or events from the 3d Brigade Combat Team, 1st Infantry Division units that previously used them.

- Tempesta Hall is the main academic and administrative building on the RRC campus. Named after U.S. Army Staff Sergeant Anthony Tempesta, who was posthumously awarded the Distinguished Service Cross for his actions during World War II, it is home to the RRC's executive, administrative, and institutional support offices and 26 classrooms that can teach between 16 and 40 students each.
- The RRC Annex building, located next to Tempesta Hall, is a multipurpose facility with three modular classrooms spaces that can each be configured to teach between 24 and 96 students using retractable wall panels, two standard 16-student classrooms, a conference room, and offices for the RRC's academic department leaders and instructors. The U.S. Army Medical Recruiting Brigade headquarters is located on the top floor of the Annex .
- The RRC Noncommissioned Officer Academy is located across the street from Tempesta Hall. Originally housed in the RRC Annex, the facility was established in February 2024 and is home to the Senior Leader Courses for Army military occupational specialty (MOS) codes 79R (Recruiter) and 79S (Career Counselor).
- The RRC Student Housing Complex and Balcombe Barracks Complex consist of nine barracks buildings that can house nearly 900 students. The rooms meet the U.S. Department of Defense's (DoD) "1+1 Standard," which consists of a two-bedroom apartment with separate bedrooms and closets for each occupant and a shared bathroom, kitchenette, and common area. The RRC Complex has upgraded rooms including a four-burner stove with oven, full-size refrigerator/freezer, and a dining table with four chairs.

Three support facilities are located adjacent to the RRC and provide services to both the RRC and the Fort Knox community:

- The Cantigny Dining Facility provides students with meals while attending courses at the RRC. Named in honor of the Battle of Cantigny, which was the first major combat engagement for both the American Expeditionary Forces and 1st Infantry Division Soldiers during World War I, the facility is managed by the Fort Knox Logistics Readiness Center and is operated by a government contractor. It is located between the student housing complexes and classroom buildings and is open nearly year round regardless of weather conditions to provide meals to students attending the RRC as well as other schools and training courses at Fort Knox.
- The Natcher Physical Fitness Center, located across from the RRC Annex building, provides physical fitness facilities for both the RRC and Fort Knox. The center is managed by the Fort Knox Family and Morale, Welfare, and Recreation office and is used to by both the RRC and the Fort Knox community to conduct the Army Combat Fitness Test (ACFT) and daily physical fitness activities for both students and RRC Soldiers. It houses three full-court basketball/volleyball courts, two glass-enclosed racquetball courts, strength training area, aerobic exercise room, and elevated indoor track. Outside is a 400 meter rubber-surface running track, 1-mile gravel-surface running trail, athletic field, pull-up bars, obstacle course, and outdoor fitness equipment.
- The Balcombe Recreation Center, located in the Balcombe Barracks Complex, provides entertainment and recreation services to RRC students and the Fort Knox community. The center is managed by the Fort Knox Family and Morale, Welfare, and Recreation office and has a wide selection of services including computer, Xbox, and PlayStation gaming stations, free movie and video game checkout, movie theater room, sports room with projector screen, billiards, table tennis, electronic dartboards, foosball tables, flag football and dodgeball equipment, and outdoor volleyball, basketball, and tennis courts.

== Organizational structure ==
More than 150 active duty and Active Guard and Reserve Army soldiers, Department of the Army (DA) Civilians, and U.S. government contractor employees work in the executive office, Headquarters Company, two instructional departments, noncommissioned officer academy, and 12 academic and administrative support divisions. The RRC trains approximately 6,500 Soldiers and civilians each year in one of 16 in-person or online courses covering recruiting, career counseling, staff functions, recruiting leadership, unit command, and executive leadership.

=== Leadership ===
The RRC is commanded by a colonel who serves as the institution's commandant and leads its educational and operational activities in accordance with Army, TRADOC, and USAREC regulations and policies. They are assisted by a Command Sergeant Major who serves as both the RRC senior enlisted advisor and commandant of the RRC Noncommissioned Officer Academy (NCOA), a DA civilian that serves as the RRC's Dean/Chief Academic Officer and supervises its eight academic support divisions, and a lieutenant colonel that serves as the RRC's chief of staff (CofS) supervising its four administrative support divisions and providing oversight of the RRC Headquarters Company (HHC).

=== Instructor Selection ===
Senior recruiting and career counselor NCOs may be considered for instructor duty by either volunteering or being selected for screening by RRC, USAREC, and U.S. Army Human Resources Command (HRC) personnel. They must have demonstrated exceptional performance in multiple recruiting or retention leadership positions, be eligible for assignment to the RRC, and pass an interview process to be selected as an instructor. Selected NCOs typically serve a two to three-year assignment as an instructor teaching one to three individual courses, and may volunteer to serve an additional one to two years in an academic or administrative support position.

== Headquarters Company ==
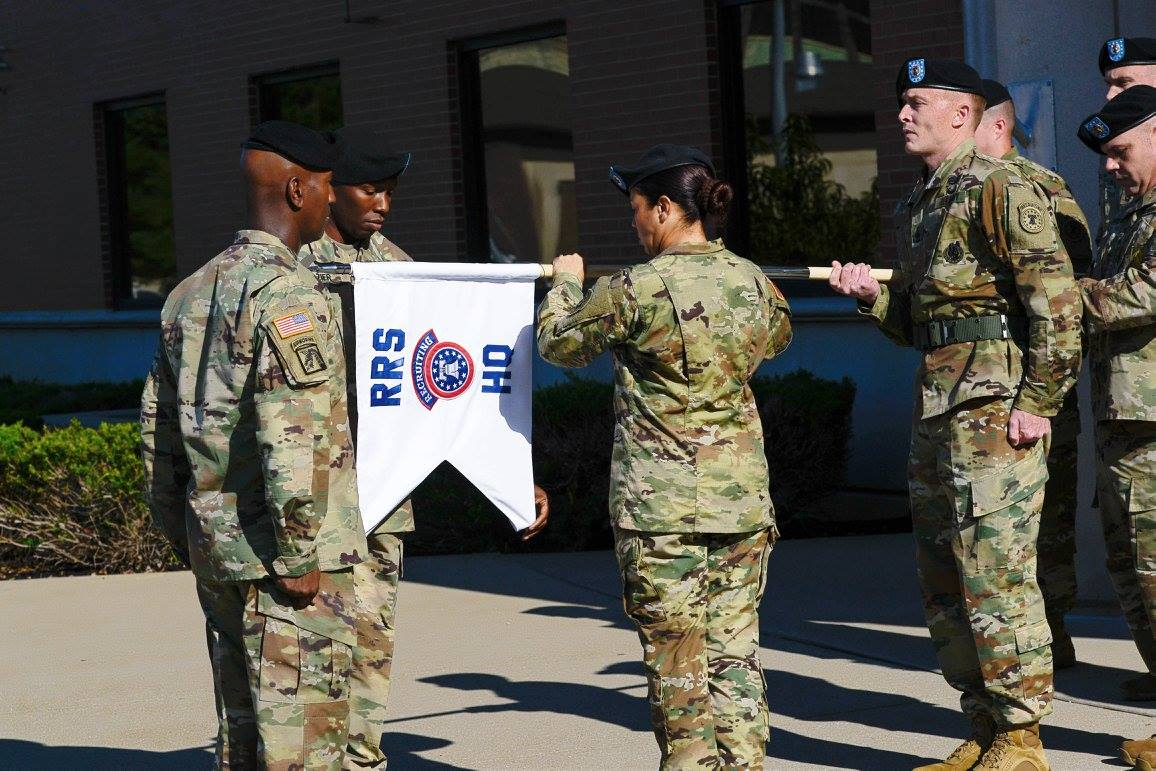
The guidon for Headquarters Company, U.S. Army Recruiting and Retention School is uncased during its Activation Ceremony on Oct. 4, 2016.

The Headquarters Company (HHC) is responsible for the health, morale, welfare, training, discipline, conduct, and combat readiness of Soldiers assigned to the RRC. Commanded by a captain who is assisted by a first sergeant and several military and civilian staff members, the HHC is responsible for providing mission command, logistics, military justice, training and readiness, administrative support, and quality of life functions for the RRC's Soldiers and students.

== Instructional departments ==
Two instructional departments - the Recruiting Department and the Retention Department - are responsible for the instruction of nearly all courses taught at the RRC and daily management of instructors and students. Each department is led by a sergeant major and is divided into instructional divisions responsible for the teaching of specific courses, with the Dean/Chief Academic Officer providing educational oversight and the CofS providing military oversight to the departments.

=== Recruiting Department ===
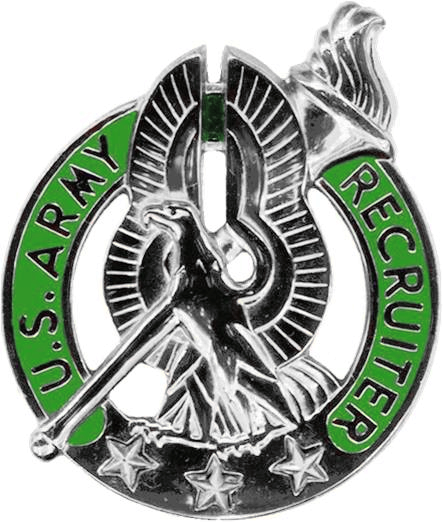
U.S. Army Basic Recruiter Badge

The Recruiting Department provides instruction to Army Soldiers selected for recruiting duty or holding the recruiting military occupational specialty (MOS) code 79R (Recruiter). It is led by an Army recruiting sergeant major and divided into five instructional divisions led by either a first sergeant or master sergeant, with each division's instructors teaching specific recruiting courses to students.

==== Army Recruiter Course (ARC) ====
Divisions 1, 2, and 3 teach the Army Recruiter Course (ARC), a seven-week basic qualification course taught to all Soldiers selected for recruiting duty, and is the largest course taught at the RRC. The ARC teaches students the principles of adaptive leadership, eligibility, technology systems, interpersonal communications, Army programs, time management, prospecting, interviewing, and processing. Students must graduate from this course to be awarded the Army Recruiter Badge, Army Skill Qualification Identifier (SQI) code 4 (Non-Career Recruiter) and be authorized to perform recruiting duties.

==== Recruiting Station Commander Course (RSCC) ====
Division 4 teaches the Recruiting Station Commander Course (RSCC), a four-week basic leadership course managed by the RRC Noncommissioned Officer Academy (NCOA) and taught to recruiting NCOs who volunteer to change their MOS code to 79R and permanently remain on recruiting duty in a leadership or staff capacity. Students must graduate from this course to change their MOS to 79R, be awarded the Army Additional Skill Identifier (ASI) code V6 (Station Commander), and be authorized to lead recruiters and manage recruiting offices.

===== Recruiter Live Fire Exercise (RLF) =====
The Recruiting Live Fire Exercise (RLF) is a one-week capstone exercise conducted on the final week of each ARC and RSCC class that sends students to Army recruiting station throughout the United States to execute what they have learned through practical application in a real-world environment. The ARC and RSCC classes are combined, with RSCC students assigned five to eight ARC students each and given responsibility and task of managing the ARC students as if they were recruiters working at that local recruiting station, including area research, missioning, prospecting, lead generation, and processing. The RLF is managed by the RRC's Futures, Assessment, Integration, and Research Division (FAIR) with ARC and RSCC instructors supervising and evaluating the students throughout the week. Any real-world leads or applicants that students generate are handed over to the local recruiting station for further processing and enlistment.

==== Advanced courses ====
Division 5 teaches seven advanced recruiting and recruiting leadership courses:

- The Health Care Recruiting Course (HCRC) is a three-week advanced qualification course that trains selected recruiting NCOs and Army Medical Department (AMEDD) officers on recruiting and processing medical professionals into direct commissioned officer positions within AMEDD. Recruiting NCO's must have graduated from ARC before attending this course, and AMEDD officers must graduate from this course in order to be awarded the Army Recruiter Badge for permanent wear on their uniforms. All recruiting personnel must graduate from this course in order to be awarded the Army ASI code 4N (Health Care Recruiter) and be authorized to perform health care recruiting duties.
- The Guidance Counselor/Operations Course (GCOC) is a four-week advanced qualification course that trains selected recruiting NCOs to work in recruiting battalion and brigade operations sections or as Army liaisons at Military Entrance Processing Stations (MEPS). Prospective students must complete a three-week preparatory program consisting of on-the-job training with operations NCOs at an Army recruiting battalion and Army guidance counselors at a MEPS prior to attending. Recruiting personnel must graduate from this course in order to be awarded the Army ASI code V7 (Guidance Counselor) and authorized to process enlistment paperwork for individuals joining the Army and Army Reserve.
- The Master Trainer Course (MTC) is a two-week advanced qualification course for Soldiers selected to serve as a Master Trainer in a recruiting battalion, brigade, or at command level. The course teaches students how to effectively evaluate recruiting teams, stations, and companies, evaluate the application and development of needs-based training using the Assess, Develop, Design, Implement, and Evaluate (ADDIE) process, manage Soldier training though the Army Digital Training Management System (DTMS) and Army Learning Management System (ALMS), manage a unit's schools program, and plan and execute training events. Soldiers must graduate from this course in order to serve in a Master Trainer role.
- The Health Care Recruiting Officer-In-Charge Course (HCROICC) is a five-week distributed learning leadership course that trains selected AMEDD officer recruiters on recruiting office management. AMEDD officers selected to serve as Army health care recruiting station officers-in-charge (OIC) must attend the course within their first year of assignment to the role; officers not selected for an OIC role may attend on a space-available basis or as directed by their unit.
- The Company Executive Officer Course (COXOC) is a two-week leadership course that trains recruiting company executive officers (XO) on the administrative, technical, and tactical skills necessary to successfully perform the role in a recruiting company. Officers must graduate from this course to be awarded the Army Recruiter Badge for permanent wear on their uniforms.
- The Recruiting Company Commander/First Sergeant Course (RCCFSC) is a three-week leadership course that trains officers selected for recruiting company commander and first sergeant positions. The course focuses on training the company commanders and first sergeants together on the unique roles and functions of leading and managing an Army recruiting company, including the responsibilities of the company commander and first sergeant within Army recruiting, overcoming the challenges of leading geographically-dispersed Soldiers, and the importance of working together as a command team to achieve the mission. Officers must graduate from this course to be awarded the Army Recruiter Badge for permanent wear on their uniforms, and both officers and recruiting NCOs must graduate from this course to be assigned to recruiting company command and first sergeant positions.
- The Recruiting Pre-Command Course (PCC) is a two-week leadership course that trains Colonels and Lieutenant Colonels selected for recruiting battalion or brigade command on the history, structure, and functions of Army recruiting. During week two of the course, the officers are joined by their unit's Command Sergeant Major to help develop their working relationship before assuming command. A one- or two-day executive version of this course is taught by request to Army general officers, senior enlisted advisors, and senior Army civilian leadership. Incoming commanders and general officers must graduate from this course to be awarded the Army Recruiter Badge for permanent wear on their uniforms; those that do not graduate may only wear the badge on their uniform during their assignment to USAREC, and must remove it upon transfer to a non-recruiting assignment.

=== Retention Department ===
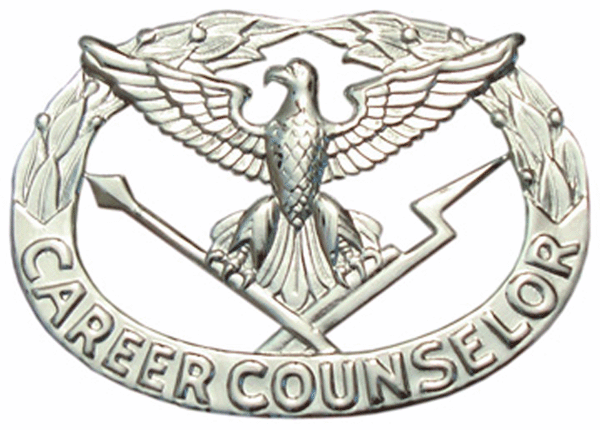
U.S. Army Career Counselor Badge

The Retention Department provides instruction to Army Soldiers selected for career counselor duty or holding the career counselor MOS codes 79S (Career Counselor). It is led by an Army retention sergeant major and has one instructional division led by a master sergeant and several instructors teaching retention courses to students.

- The Career Counselor Course (CCC) is a nine-week basic qualification course for NCOs who volunteer to permanently remain on career counselor duty in the Army. Students must graduate from this course in order to change their MOS to 79S, be awarded the Army Career Counselor Badge, and be authorized to perform career counselor duties and lead retention NCOs.
- The Senior Retention Operations Course is a three-week advanced qualification course for senior NCOs who manage career counselor functions at the division level and higher.
- The Department of the Army Retention Training (DART) is a one-week course taught by RRC retention mobile training teams at U.S. Army installations around the world. The course provides training to Soldiers selected to serve as unit retention NCOs at the company and battalion levels. The course does not qualify Soldiers to serve as career counselors or wear the Army Career Counselor Badge, but Soldiers must graduate from this course in order to later volunteer to become career counselors and change their MOS to 79S.

== Noncommissioned Officer Academy ==
The RRC Noncommissioned Officer Academy (NCOA) provides leadership training to recruiting and retention NCOs selected for promotion to sergeant first class and recruiting NCOs that have volunteered to permanently remain on recruiting duty. The NCOA is led by the RRC command sergeant major who serves as the academy's commandant and a first sergeant that serves as the deputy commandant and provides day-to-day management of the academy's courses, instructors, and students. The NCOA also provides oversight of the Recruiting Station Commander Course (RSCC), with NCOA instructors certified to teach both SLC and RSCC courses.

=== Senior Leader Course ===
The NCOA teaches the Army Senior Leader Course (SLC), a three-week Army MOS-specific leadership course that trains recruiting and career counselor NCOs selected for promotion to Sergeant First Class. Soldiers selected for promotion to Sergeant First Class must graduate from this course in order to be promoted. The course materials are a combination of Army leadership lessons developed by the United States Army Sergeants Major Academy (USASMA) and MOS-specific lessons developed by the RRC that train students to lead at the platoon, company, and battalion levels.

== Staff divisions ==
There are 12 staff divisions that manage the academic support and administrative support functions of the RRC. The divisions are split between academic support divisions managed by the dean/chief academic officer, and administrative support divisions managed by a lieutenant colonel that serves as the RRC chief of staff.

=== Academic support divisions ===
Eight academic support divisions provide curriculum development, training management, instructor training, and faculty support to the RRC, and doctrine and career field support for the RRC and Army Reserve retention courses taught at the 83rd United States Army Reserve Readiness Training Center (ARRTC) located at Fort Knox, and Army National Guard recruiting and retention courses taught at the Strength Maintenance Training Center (SMTC) located at Camp Robinson, Arkansas.

- The Quality Assurance Officer (QAO) is responsible for ensuring the RRC complies with all accreditation requirements, as well as conducts surveys, consolidates student performance data, and provides recommendations to the Commandant and Dean on changes to ensure the RRC remains in compliance with Army and TRADOC Regulations.
- The Training Development Division (TDD) is responsible for the development of all courseware taught or provided to students, including Programs of Instruction (POI), syllabus, lesson plans, presentations, handouts, examinations, and assessments. The division also monitors for changes in Army and USAREC regulations and updates courseware as appropriate, and provides regular interaction with instructional division chiefs to ensure courseware is being taught according to standard.
- The Office of the Registrar is responsible for all training management functions, including tracking of student enrollment, projection of training allocations and funding, updating of students military training records, and issuing of diplomas.
- The Distributed Learning Division (DLD) is responsible for the development and implementation of all distance learning courses taught at the RRC. The division is also supports curriculum development, multimedia instruction, LMS administration, assessment, video production and virtual training resources.
- The Faculty and Staff Development Division (FSDD) is responsible for managing the Common Faculty Development Program (CFDP) and the training of instructors and staff members, maintaining the RRC Instructor Certification Program and Faculty Development Recognition Program, and administering the RRC Instructor of the Quarter and Instructor of the Year competitions.
- The Futures, Assessment, Integration, and Research Division (FAIR) is responsible for conducting research and testing on new recruiting methods and concepts. The division also provides training support to foreign military partners as requested by Army leadership.
- The Personnel Development Division (PDD) is responsible for the development and management of all career management functions for the Army's CMF 79. The division works closely with USAREC, U.S. Army Human Resources Command (HRC), the Army's Deputy Chief of Staff for Personnel (Army G-1), the Chief of the Army Reserve (OCAR), and the Chief of the National Guard Bureau (NGB) on policies and procedures that may affect Army, Army Reserve, and Army National Guard recruiting and retention personnel.

=== Administrative support divisions ===
Four administrative support divisions that provide the day-to-day execution of all student operations, administration, budget, logistics, and information management functions.

- The Student Operations Division (OPS) manages the daily operations of the RRC, including student in- and out-processing, attendance tracking, dining facility coordination, ceremonial scheduling and support, and mission requirements and tracking. The division also serves as the RRC's International Military Student Office (IMSO), which provides support to international military students attending the RRC and their families while they stay on Fort Knox.
- Student Administrative Services (SAS) manages the qualifications and assignments of students while serving as the liaison between the RRC, HRC, USAREC, Installation Military Personnel Divisions (MPDs), and the Defense Finance and Accounting Service (DFAS). The division works with HRC and USAREC's personnel branch on assignment actions for ARC students and updating of student's personnel records.
- The Information Management Office (IMO) manages all information technology (IT) equipment and requirements for the RRC, and provides IT support to external students and visitors using RRC facilities or external agencies as required.
- The Logistics Management Division (LMD) manages all logistics and facility requirements for the RRC. The division maintains 11 buildings on the RRC campus, issues uniform items to RRC Soldiers and students, performs inventory management functions, and is responsible for all government purchases made by the RRC.

== Awards and decorations ==
Unit Decorations
Ribbon	Award	Period of Service	Army General Orders No.
	Army Superior Unit Award	1 October 2005 - 30 September 2006	2017-21
	Army Superior Unit Award	1 October 2015 - 30 September 2016	2019-24

== Notable Persons and Events ==
- Sgt. 1st Class Samuel Woodberry, an ARC instructor, was a competitor on Season 18 of The Voice, an American television music competition. Woodberry's first appearance was during episode 3's blind auditions which aired on March 2, 2020, where he competed under his stage name "Samuel Wilco" and performed Lately by Stevie Wonder. He was selected by judges Nick Jonas and Kelly Clarkson and chose to join Jonas' team. He was eliminated during episode 8's battle round event which aired on April 6, 2020.
- Sgt. 1st Class Andrew Powell, FSDD noncommissioned officer-in-charge, was the first RRC instructor and the 34th enlisted Soldier in Army history to earn the Master Army Instructor Badge (MAIB). To earn the badge, Powell completed over 480 hours of classroom teaching, graduated three advanced Army training and development courses, received near-perfect scores on eight teaching evaluations and conducted 11 teaching evaluations of other instructors, and developed and presented a lesson plan to a board consisting of senior Army instructors including a MAIB-certified instructor.
- Four RRC instructors have been named as the U.S. Army TRADOC Noncommissioned Officer Instructor of the Year - the Army's top enlisted instructor - including a record-setting three consecutive years. Sgt. 1st Class Clifford Hammond, a RSCC instructor, earned the title in 2019; Sgt. 1st Class Heather Rankin, an SLC instructor, earned it in 2020; Sgt. 1st Class Joel Sanchez, a RSCC instructor, earned it in 2021; and Master Sgt. Shay Howlett, the FSDD noncommissioned officer-in-charge, earned it in 2024. The Army's top instructors are selected by TRADOC from the Instructor of the Year for each of the 27 Army CoE's, Colleges, and Schools under the Army University system.

== Previous Leaders ==
Previous Commandants
Dates	Commandant
July 2023 - July 2025	Col. Rick Frank
July 2021 - July 2023	Col. Kevin Polosky
July 2019 - July 2021	Col. Christopher Stallings
August 2017 - July 2019	Col. Carter Price
July 2015 - August 2017	Col. Isaac Johnson
April 2012 - July 2015	Col. Terrence Murrill
Jul 2005 - April 2012	Col. James Comish
August 2003 - July 2005	Col. Jack Collins
August 2002 - August 2003	Lt. Col. David Gill
June 2001 - August 2002	Col. Michael Hoff
March 2000 - June 2001	Col. Gary Carlson
August 1995 - March 2000	Col. Wayne Stephens
August 1993 - August 1995	Col. Bruce Terrell
August 1991 - August 1993	Col. Charles Benson
July 1989 - August 1991	Col. James Farmer
September 1986 - June 1989	Lt. Col. Alan Paczkowski
July 1983 - September 1986	Col. David Sholly
January 1983 - July 1983	Col. David McMillon

Previous Command Sergeants Major
Dates	Command Sergeant Major
August 2024 - December 2024	Sgt. Maj. Winter Washington
August 2022 - August 2024	Command Sgt. Maj. Jose Hernandez
November 2019 - August 2022	Command Sgt. Maj. Craig Russell
October 2016 - November 2019	Command Sgt. Maj. Joseph Multunas
December 2015 - October 2016	Sgt. Maj. James Nicolai
November 2014 - December 2015	Command Sgt. Maj. Anthony Stoneburg
September 2012 - November 2014	Command Sgt. Maj. Troy Hendreith
August 2010 - August 2012	Command Sgt. Maj. Donna Punihaole
May 2008 - May 2010	Command Sgt. Maj. Peter Moody
July 2006 - May 2008	Command Sgt. Maj. Jack Peters
October 2004 - July 2006	Command Sgt. Maj. Anthony Gales
August 2001 - October 2004	Command Sgt. Maj. Thomas LePuma
May 1999 - August 2001	Command Sgt. Maj. Harold Blount
May 1998 - May 1999	Command Sgt. Maj. David Swartzentruber
August 1994 - May 1998	Command Sgt. Maj. Robert Fernandez
