= Regimental combat team =

Provisional major U.S. infantry unit

A regimental combat team (RCT) is a provisional major infantry unit which has seen use by branches of the United States Armed Forces. It is formed by augmenting a regular infantry regiment with smaller combat, combat support and combat service support units.

The United States Army first adopted the RCT concept just prior to World War II, where it served as the infantry-centric counterpart to the Combat Command used by armored forces. RCTs were widely used during World War II and the Korean War but were disbanded after the adoption of the Pentomic structure in 1957.

The United States Marine Corps maintains the use of the RCT to the present day.

== U.S. Army ==
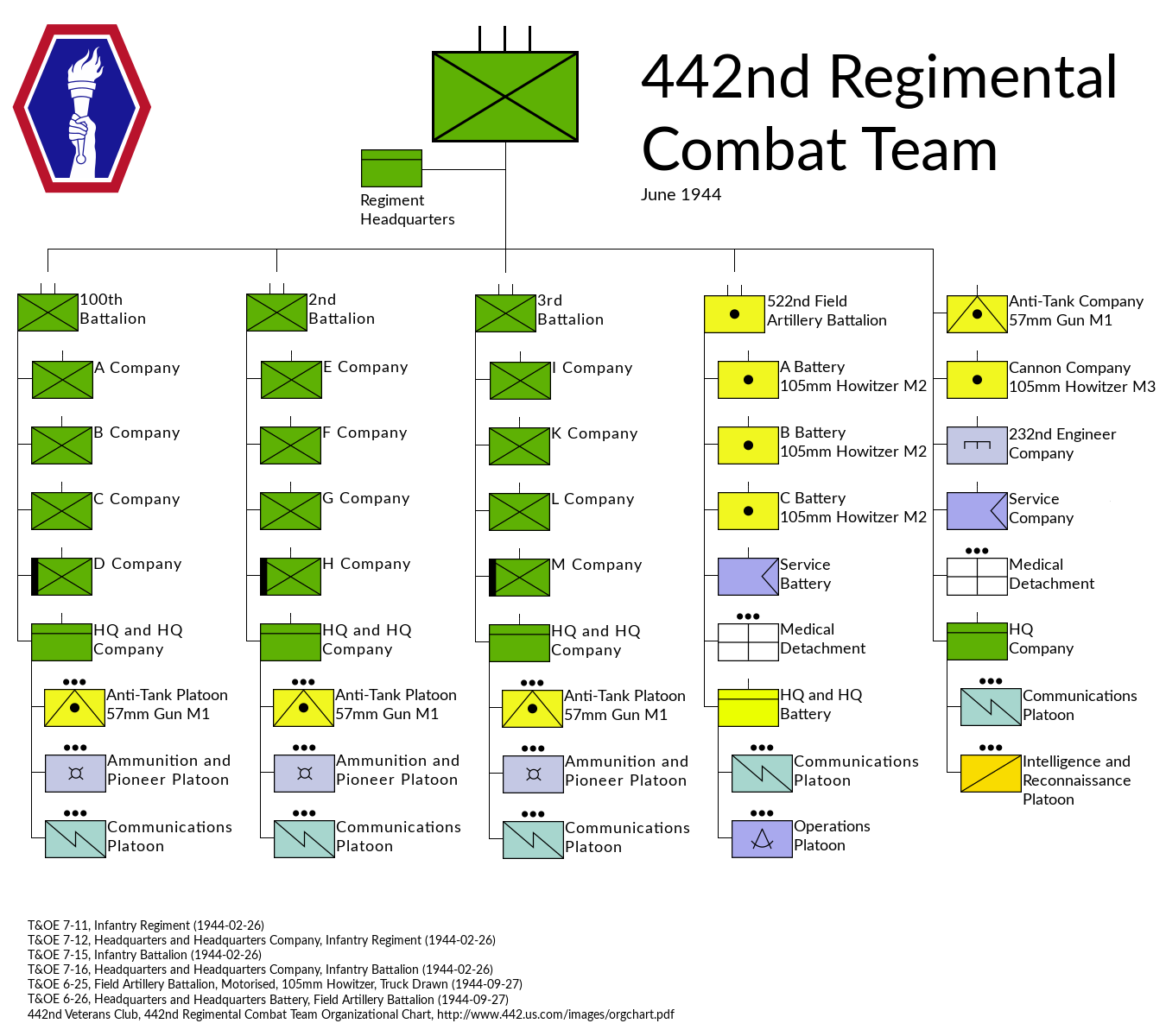
Table of organization and equipment of the 442nd Regimental Combat Team in 1944

In 1939, the US Army formally switched from the square division to the triangular division, eliminating the brigade and leaving the regiment as the basic combat subunit of a division. However, the Army also recognized that it would need a separate infantry force to conduct missions too small for a division and created the regimental combat team (RCT). The 2nd Division, which was first to test the triangular division concept, initially referred to this type of formation as an "echelon" but as the term already had generally accepted military definitions the combat team term was officially adopted instead.

During World War II a typical RCT consisted of an infantry regiment, a field artillery battalion, a combat engineer company, a medical company, and a signals platoon. However the organization could be tailored to fit its mission and might include additional units, such as a company from a separate tank battalion, a company from a tank destroyer battalion, and a battery from an anti-aircraft artillery battalion. Usually the RCT was led by the commanding officer of the infantry regiment (Colonel) but on occasion a brigadier general was sent to command it. Most infantry regiments not part of a division were organized as RCTs, but by the end of the war most infantry divisions were also organizing their regiments as RCTs.

The concept was retained after the end of World War II due to the perceived need for smaller units in the atomic age and RCTs were issued their own shoulder sleeve insignia. RCTs were used extensively during the Korean War, with the 187th Airborne Regimental Combat Team illustrating the typical organization of an RCT from this era. The army also stood up Logistical Commands to support the RCTs of the post-WWII era. The insignia, like the logistical command's were nearly all red, white and blue with simple designs. The RCT was retained until 1957 when the Army was reorganized under the Pentomic structure and adopted the Combat Arms Regimental System (CARS), under which both regiments and battalions were eliminated as tactical units and replaced with battle groups. When the era ended in the early 1970s, so did most of the army logistical commands.

There would be four RCTs that would gain fame:

- The 74th RCT which had been made up of Norwegian immigrants and ex-pats and had previously been the 474th Infantry Regiment in World War II.
- The 158th RCT "Bushmasters" who had earned their nickname in the Pacific during World War II and whose lineage lives on in the 158th Maneuver Enhancement Brigade of the Arizona National Guard.
- The 187th RCT "Rakkasans" who fought in the Korean War.
- The 442nd RCT, made up primarily of Japanese-Americans who fought in Italy and became one of the most decorated units in the Army.

INSIGNIA OF REGIMENTAL COMBAT TEAMS
4TH RCT	7TH RCT	25TH RCT	74TH RCT	75TH RCT	103RD RCT
107TH RCT	111TH RCT	150TH RCT	157TH RCT	158TH RCT	163RD RCT
166TH RCT	176TH RCT	178TH RCT	182ND RCT	187TH RCT	196TH RCT
278TH RCT	295TH RCT	296TH RCT	298TH RCT	299TH RCT	351ST RCT
442ND RCT (Original design)	442ND RCT				

== U.S. Marine Corps ==
The U.S. Marine Corps has retained the regiment as a basic unit smaller than a division but larger than a battalion, and it continued to employ reinforced regiments as RCTs in Iraq and Afghanistan.

Under current US Marine Corps doctrine, a Marine Division typically contains three organic Marine infantry regiments. Whenever a Marine Expeditionary Brigade (MEB) is formed within its parent Marine Expeditionary Force (MEF), one of the division's infantry regiments is designated as the base of the regimental combat team (RCT) and serves as the ground combat element (GCE) of the MEB.

The regiment, commanded by a colonel, consists of a Headquarters Company and three identical Marine infantry battalions. The regiment is then heavily reinforced by other division assets to form the RCT.

These reinforcements typically include:

- One artillery battalion (drawn from the division's organic artillery regiment), consisting of a headquarters battery and four identical firing batteries, each containing six 155 mm towed howitzers;
- An armored vehicle battalion equivalent, consisting of an assault amphibian company (reinforced) (48 amphibious assault vehicles), a light armored reconnaissance company (reinforced) (27 light armored vehicles) and a tank company (reinforced) (14 main battle tanks), each drawn from their parent division's organic type battalion;
- A combat support battalion equivalent, consisting of a combat engineer company, a reconnaissance company (each drawn from their parent division's organic type battalion), and a support company, formed from the parent division's headquarters battalion, consisting of platoons from the headquarters, communications, and truck companies.
- The RCT receives dedicated logistical support from a combat logistics battalion, which is organic to the combat logistics regiment of the MEB.

Therefore, the RCT is roughly the same size (approximately 4,500–5,000 Marines and Sailors) and has generally the same number of battalions (and battalion equivalents) as a US Army brigade combat team (BCT). However, the RCT as the ground combat element (GCE) of a MEB, is combined with a regimental equivalent Marine aircraft group (itself equivalent to a US Army combat aviation brigade) as the air combat element (ACE), a battalion-sized command element (CE), and the aforementioned combat logistics regiment as the (LCE) to complete the organizational structure of the MEB.

== See also ==
- Brigade combat team
