= Headquarters Battalion United States Army =

United States Army administrative support unit

- Military District of Washington shoulder sleeve insignia, worn by soldiers in Headquarters Battalion United States Army
- Active: 1 June 1992–present
- Country: United States
- Branch: United States Army
- Type: Battalion
- Part of: United States Army Military District of Washington
- Headquarters: Joint Base Myer–Henderson Hall, Virginia
- Motto: "Legion!"

Commanders
- Commander: LTC Danielle K. Cork

Headquarters Battalion United States Army (HQ BN USA) is a battalion of the United States Army that provides administrative support to soldiers located in the National Capital Region. It consists of two companies: Headquarters Company, United States Army, which provides support to Headquarters, Department of the Army personnel (including the Army Secretariat and the Army Staff); and Headquarters and Headquarters Company, United States Army Garrison, Joint Base Myer–Henderson Hall, which provides administrative support to the United States Army garrison at Joint Base Myer–Henderson Hall. The battalion and its two companies are located on Joint Base Myer–Henderson Hall, near Arlington, Virginia.

== The battalion ==
The battalion runs all non-commissioned officer, or NCO school order of merit lists and required counseling; operates an NCO mentorship program; and facilitates promotion boards, soldier and NCO of the quarter boards, and NCO professional development.

HQ BN USA also functions as a Summary Court-Martial Convening Authority for the Military District of Washington (MDW).

=== History ===
Headquarters Battalion United States Army was established on 1 June 1992. The battalion was designated a permanent unit in October 1993 and aligned under MDW.

== Headquarters Company, United States Army ==
Headquarters Company, United States Army is the largest company in the United States Army, consisting of approximately 3,500 uniformed personnel in Headquarters, Department of the Army (composed of the Army Secretariat and the Army Staff). The company also supports soldiers in the National Guard Bureau, the Army Reserve, and the Army national military cemeteries (including Arlington National Cemetery). It is unique as the only company in the United States Army authorized its own distinctive guidon, unit crest, and shoulder patch (in the shape of the Pentagon).

=== History ===
Headquarters Company, United States Army was established on 10 May 1955, by the Military District of Washington (MDW). In 1992 or later, the company became part of Headquarters Battalion United States Army.

=== Insignia ===
==== Shoulder sleeve insignia ====
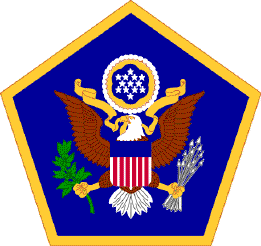
Shoulder sleeve insignia of Headquarters Company, United States Army

The shoulder sleeve insignia of Headquarters Company, United States Army was originally approved on 23 April 1968, for Headquarters Company, United States Army, and Headquarters Company, Women's Army Corps. On 7 February 1978, the insignia was redesignated for Headquarters Company, United States Army.

The pentagonal shape alludes to the Pentagon building, the site of Headquarters, Department of the Army. The United States coat of arms is seen in full color, as on the secretary of the Army's flag. The blue of the background is derived from the flag of the United States, which symbolizes trust and loyalty. The gold border is symbolic of the leadership provided by the Army Staff.

==== Distinctive unit insignia ====
The distinctive unit insignia of Headquarters Company, United States Army was originally approved 11 January 1934. The method of wear was changed 13 January 1966.

The olive branch is an emblem of peace and security, and the griffin represents vigilance, courage, and swiftness.

The distinctive unit insignia is worn in pairs.

== Headquarters and Headquarters Company, United States Army Garrison, Joint Base Myer–Henderson Hall ==
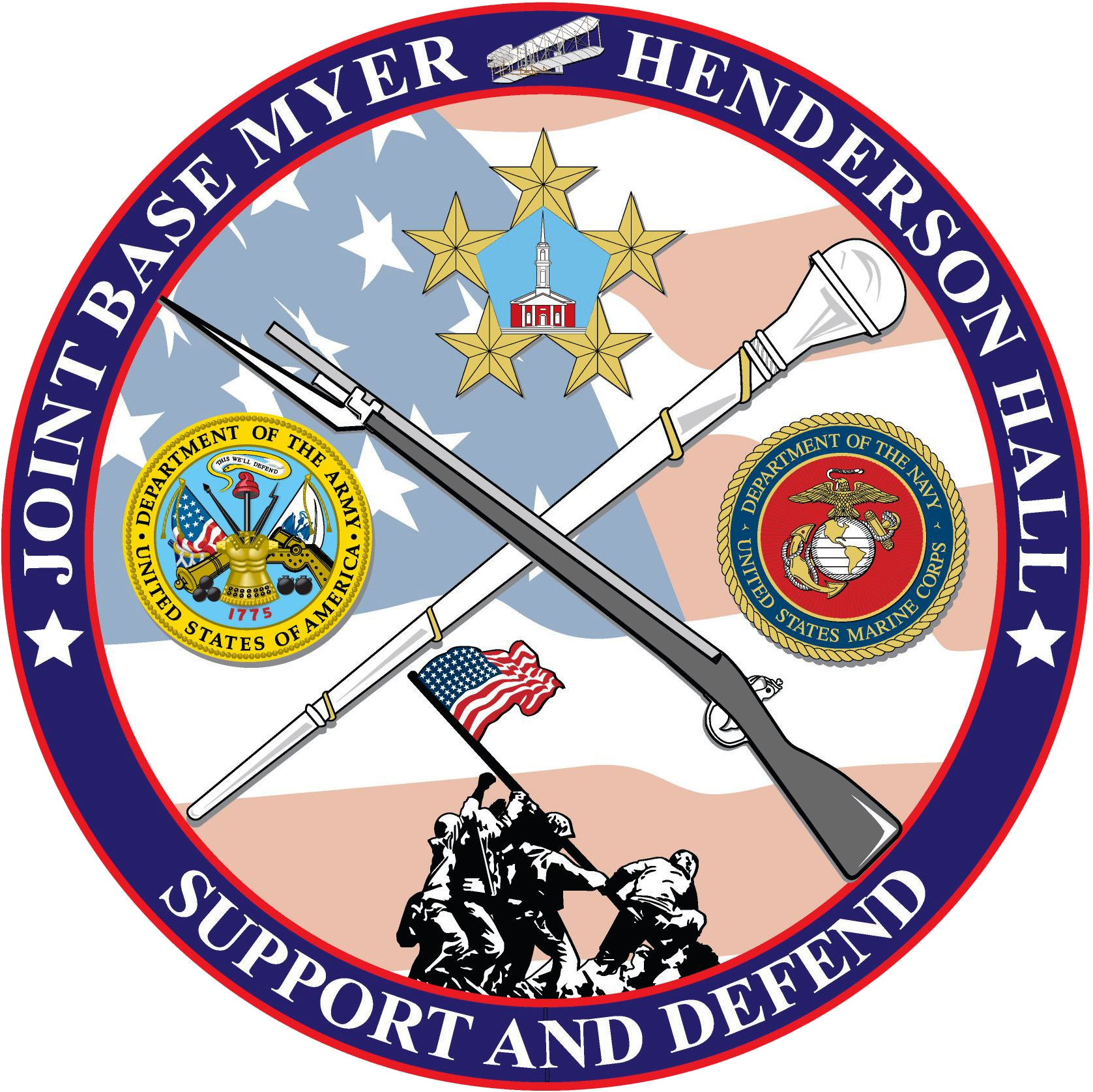
Joint Base Myer–Henderson Hall emblem

Headquarters and Headquarters Company, United States Army Garrison, Joint Base Myer–Henderson Hall is the administrative support unit for the United States Army garrison at Joint Base Myer–Henderson Hall.

The garrison's headquarters and headquarters company (HHC) is the second largest company in the United States Army. The garrison's HHC supports all joint activities in the National Capital Region, to include approximately 2,100 uniformed personnel in the Office of the Secretary of Defense, the Joint Staff, the White House agencies, the State Department, the National Security Council, and numerous other organizations.

== See also ==
- Headquarters, Department of the Army, leadership of the United States Army
- Headquarters and headquarters company, a type of headquarters and support unit
