= Proclamation 80 =

1861 U.S. presidential proclamation signed by Abraham Lincoln

- A Proclamation by the President of the United States, April 15, 1861

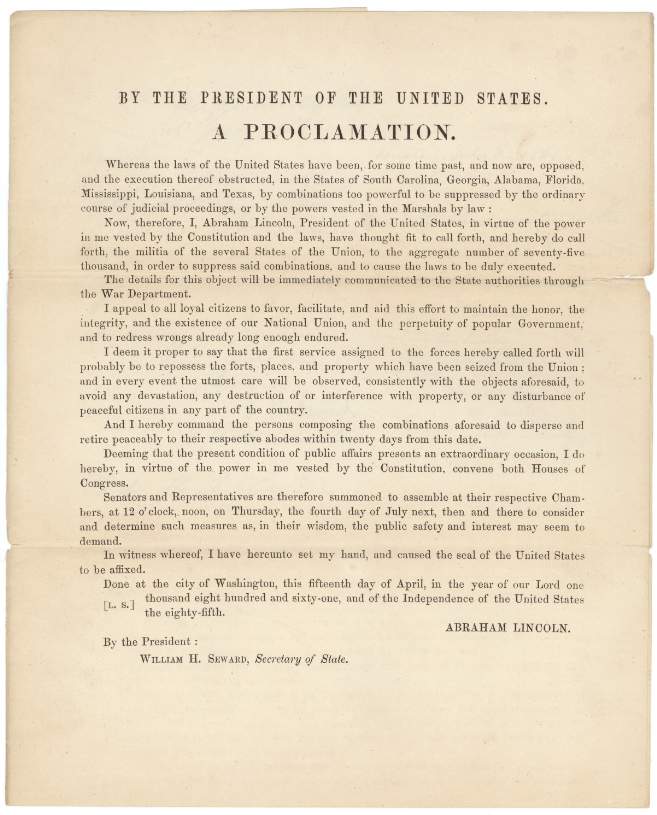
- Proclamation 80
- Type: Presidential proclamation
- President: Abraham Lincoln
- Signed: April 15, 1861

Federal Register details
- Publication date: April 15, 1861

Summary
- Responds to the Confederate attack on Fort Sumter, South Carolina by calling forth 75,000 militiamen.

Proclamation 80, titled "A Proclamation by the President of the United States, April 15, 1861," was a presidential proclamation signed by Abraham Lincoln, the 16th president of the United States. It called for 75,000 militiamen to suppress the rebellion in the states that had formed the Confederacy.

== Background ==
In April 1861 Confederate forces attacked U.S. troops at Fort Sumter in South Carolina, plunging the country into civil war. Moving quickly against the insurrection, President Abraham Lincoln called up the militia and suspended the writ of habeas corpus—a legal order enabling an individual to seek release from unlawful detention. In suspending that privilege, he exercised an authority that Chief Justice Roger Taney then found, in Ex parte Merryman, constitutionally reserved for Congress. Lincoln then called the entire Congress into extraordinary session, where he sought congressional approval of his actions.

== Text ==
The text of the Proclamation is as follows:

BY THE PRESIDENT OF THE UNITED STATES:

A PROCLAMATION

WHEREAS the laws of the United States have been, for some time past, and now are opposed, and the execution thereof obstructed, in the States of South Carolina, Georgia, Alabama, Florida, Mississippi, Louisiana, and Texas, by combinations too powerful to be suppressed by the ordinary course of judicial proceedings, or by the powers vested in the marshals by law.

Now, therefore, I, ABRAHAM LINCOLN, President of the United States, in virtue of the power in me vested by the Constitution and the laws, have thought fit to call forth, and hereby do call forth, the militia of the several States of the Union, to the aggregate number of seventy-five thousand, in order to suppress said combinations, and to cause the laws to be duly executed.

The details for this object will be immediately communicated to the State authorities through the War Department.

I appeal to all loyal citizens to favor, facilitate, and aid this effort to maintain the honor, the integrity, and the existence of our National Union, and the perpetuity of popular government; and to redress wrongs already long enough endured. I deem it proper to say that the first service assigned to the forces hereby called forth will probably be to repossess the forts, places, and property which have been seized from the Union; and in every event, the utmost care will be observed, consistently with the objects aforesaid, to avoid any devastation, any destruction of, or interference with, property, or any disturbance of peaceful citizens in any part of the country.

And I hereby command the persons composing the combinations aforesaid to disperse, and retire peaceably to their respective abodes within twenty days from this date.

Deeming that the present condition of public affairs presents an extraordinary occasion, I do hereby, in virtue of the power in me vested by the Constitution, convene both Houses of Congress. Senators and Representatives are therefore summoned to assemble at their respective chambers, at twelve o'clock noon, on Thursday, the fourth day of July next, then and there to consider and determine such measures as, in their wisdom, the public safety and interest may seem to demand.

By the President:ABRAHAM LINCOLN
Secretary of State WILLIAM H. SEWARD

== Legal authority ==
Until the early 20th century, the United States relied on calling out militia and volunteers rather than expanding the regular army. In 1861, the law governing the use of the militia for federal purposes was the Militia Act of 1795, which provided:

Section 1. ...in case of an insurrection in any state, against the government thereof, it shall be lawful for the President of the United States, on application of the legislature of such state, or of the executive, (when the legislature cannot be convened) to call forth such number of the militia of any other state or states, as may be applied for, as he may judge sufficient to suppress such insurrection...

Section 2. And be it further enacted, That whenever the laws of the United States shall be opposed, or the execution thereof obstructed, in any state, by combinations too powerful to be suppressed by the ordinary course of judicial proceedings, or by the powers vested in the marshals by this act, it shall be lawful for the President of the United States, to call forth the militia of such state, or of any other state or states, as may be necessary to suppress such combinations, and to cause the laws to be duly executed; and the use of militia so to be called forth may be continued, if necessary, until the expiration of thirty days after the commencement of the then next session of Congress...

Section 3. Provided always, and be it further enacted, That whenever it may be necessary, in the judgment of the President, to use the military force hereby directed to be called forth, the President shall forthwith, by proclamation, command such insurgents to disperse, and retire peaceably to their respective abode, within a limited time.

This law was the basis on which Lincoln called forth the Militia, as his Proclamation 80 explicitly ordered that

the persons composing the combinations aforesaid to disperse, and retire peaceably to their respective abodes within twenty days from this date.

With this order, it became legal for Lincoln to call forth the militia, to "suppress such combinations [which prevent the execution of the laws of the United States]," as the Militia Act provided.

However, there were restrictions on the number of men and the length of time they could serve in these capacities. State governors had more authority than the President of the United States to extend their service. Section 4 of the Militia Act of 1795 provided:

That the militia employed in the service of the United States, shall receive the same pay and allowances, as the troops of the United States, And that no officer, non-commissioned officer or private of the militia shall be compelled to serve more than three months in any one year, nor more than in due rotation with every other able-bodied man of the same rank in the battalion to which be belongs.

On March 2, 1799, the number of militia members able to be called by the president for a provisional army was limited to 75,000 men. Prior to the Civil War, this limit had never been adjusted to reflect the growth in the nation's population. During that time, there had not been a domestic insurrection in the United States even on the scale of the short-lived Whiskey Rebellion of the early 1790s, and therefore little impetus for Congress to reconsider the numerical limits to the militia that had been codified in the late eighteenth century.

== Implementation ==
CALL TO ARMS ! !

75,000 VOLUNTEERS WANTED

Washington, April 15.

The following is the form of call on the respective state Governors for troops, issued to-day:

Sir:—Under the act of Congress for calling out the militia to execute the laws of the Union to suppress insurrection, repel invasion, &c., approved February 28th, 1795, I have the honor to request your Excellency to cause to be immediately detached from the militia of your state, the quota designated in the table below to serve as infantry or riflemen for three months, or sooner, if discharged.
Your Excellency will please communicate to me the time about which your quota will be expected at its rendezvous, as it will be met as soon as possible by an officer or officers to muster it into the service and pay of the United States; at the same time the oath of fidelity to the United States will be administrated to every officer and man. The mustering officers will be instructed to receive no man under the rank of commissioned officer who is apparently over 45 or under 18 years, or who is not in physical strength and vigor. The quota to each state is as follows: Maine, New Hampshire, Vermont, Rhode Island, Connecticut, Delaware, Arkansas, Michigan, Wisconsin, Iowa, and Minnesota, one regiment each; New York 17 regiments; Pennsylvania, 15 regiments; Ohio, 13; New Jersey, Maryland, Kentucky, Missouri, four regiments each; Illinois and Indiana, six regiments each; Virginia, three regiments,Massachusetts, North Carolina, and Tennessee, two regiments each.
It is ordered that each regiment shall consist of an aggregate of officers and men of 780 men.

The total thus to be called out is 73,910 men, the remainder, which constitutes the 75,000 under the President's proclamation will be composed of troops in the District of Columbia.

== Reception ==
The reaction in the border states was almost entirely hostile. Governor Henry Rector of Arkansas stated, "The people of this Commonwealth are freemen, not slaves, and will defend to the last extremity their honor, lives, and property, against Northern mendacity and usurpation." Governor Beriah Magoffin of Kentucky declared that they would not send volunteers to a Northern army intent on subjugating their Southern brethren. Governor Claiborne Jackson of Missouri responded that, "Not one man will the state of Missouri furnish to carry on any such unholy crusade."

Governor John Ellis of North Carolina replied in a telegram to Secretary of War Simon Cameron, "I can be no party to this wicked violation of the laws of the country, and to this war upon the liberties of a free people. You can get no troops from North Carolina". Governor Isham Harris of Tennessee stated in a telegram to Lincoln, "Tennessee will furnish not a single man for the purpose of coercion, but fifty thousand if necessary for the defense of our rights and those of our Southern brothers." Governor John Letcher of Virginia, whose state had been requested to furnish three regiments totaling 5,340 men and officers, had stated in the past his intent for his state to remain neutral. In a letter to Lincoln, he declared that since the president had "chosen to inaugurate civil war, he would be sent no troops from the Old Dominion."

In contrast, most northern states communicated enthusiasm with states such as Indiana offering twice as many volunteers as requested. Massachusetts volunteers reached Washington D.C. as early as April 19.
