= Headquarters and headquarters company (United States) =

United States Army military unit

In United States Army units, a headquarters and headquarters company (HHC) is a company-sized military unit, found at the battalion level and higher. Considered one unit, a headquarters and headquarters company is two elements within one company: the headquarters element, comprising the unit's commander, executive officer, first sergeant, and additional staff; and the headquarters company. While a regular company consists of three or four platoons, an HHC consists of the headquarters element of a battalion, brigade, division, or higher level unit, as well as the headquarters company support personnel. As the headquarters personnel do not fall into the smaller units that report to them, the HHC is the unit to which they are administratively assigned. The average strength of an HHC is between 80 and 110 personnel; however, it can vary greatly based on the size of the supported headquarters.

In keeping with the Army's long-standing practice of referring to company-sized artillery units as "batteries" and company-sized cavalry units as "troops," the headquarters company element of an artillery battalion or higher is referred to as a headquarters and headquarters battery (HHB), and that of a cavalry squadron or higher is referred to as a headquarters and headquarters troop (HHT). Additionally, some high-level headquarters elements for special units are not company-sized, and instead are referred to as "detachments"; as a result, these units are formally referred to as headquarters and headquarters detachments (HHD).

== Purpose ==
The mission of the headquarters company commander is to run the administrative, logistics, readiness, maintenance, and training functions needed to support the headquarters. The headquarters staff, in turn, support their higher echelon unit commander in commanding the unit (at the battalion, brigade, division, etc. level).

While the headquarters company commander has some administrative authority and support responsibility for the headquarters staff, the headquarters company commander's operational authority is strictly limited to requirements derived from exercising the HHC's mission essential task list (METL) by fulfilling related collective training requirements to facilitate the functions of the supported echelon commander's command post, and facilitating required individual training: "...ensuring that both Soldiers and equipment are in the proper state of readiness at all times".

== Command authority ==
All headquarters element personnel assigned to an HHC fall under administrative control (ADCON) of the HHC commander, but the headquarters company is not in the operational chain of command of the supported headquarters element.

The HHC commander only exercises command authority (operational control or OPCON; directive authority) over the headquarters company element's personnel. The coordinating, personal, and special staff officers and non-commissioned officers in the headquarters element instead report directly to the battalion commander through the battalion staff supervisory chain, and are under the battalion commander's command and OPCON.

Although administratively assigned to the HHC, the battalion commander is the higher echelon commander to the headquarters company commander, and thus the HHC commander answers directly to the battalion commander; in higher command echelons the HHC commander often falls under the immediate supervision of the executive officer (XO) or chief of staff (CoS).

== Structure ==
=== Battalion headquarters company ===
The battalion's headquarters company element will be commanded by a company commander (usually a captain) who is supported by a company executive officer (usually a first lieutenant), and a company first sergeant. Additionally, the battalion HHC will contain further personnel assigned to support and sustain the specific mission of the battalion headquarters, such as maintenance and motor pool, field mess, supply, the battalion reconnaissance platoon of infantry scouts and snipers, and mortar platoon.

=== Battalion headquarters ===
A battalion's headquarters element consists of the battalion commander, the battalion executive officer (XO), the command sergeant major (CSM), and headquarters staff. Inside a battalion, the headquarters staff will often include the following officers and primary staff:

- a battalion commander, usually a lieutenant colonel
- a battalion executive officer, usually a major
- a battalion command sergeant major
- a personnel officer (S1), usually a captain
- an intelligence officer (S2), usually a captain
- an operations officer (S3), usually a major
- a logistics officer (S4), usually a captain
- a plans officer (S5), usually a major
- a communications officer (S6), usually a captain

Depending on the unit, extra support officers may round out the staff, including a medical officer, battalion chaplain, and Judge Advocate General's Corps (legal) officer if the unit is detached on independent duty (at the battalion level these supporting sections are often collectively and informally referred to as the "special staff"; at higher echelon the supporting staff are more formally divided into "Coordinating, Personal, and Special" staff elements), as well as essential non-commissioned officers and enlisted support personnel in the occupational specialties of the staff sections (S1 through S4, and S6). The battalion command sergeant major is the principal advisor to the battalion commander on matters regarding enlisted personnel.

== Scale of headquarters company and interface with higher headquarters ==
At the brigade and division (or higher) levels, the headquarters element of an HHC is similarly constituted of the brigade commander or division commander, along with his or her staff and the headquarters staff, but the personnel's ranks of the supported headquarters element staff personnel are typically greater, reflecting the greater level of responsibility at higher echelon units. However, the company commander of a headquarters company at all echelons is usually still a captain. At division and higher echelons, the headquarters administrative support function is often provided by a headquarters battalion (HHBN), usually commanded by a lieutenant colonel, which functions in addition to the HHC as a higher echelon of HQ support with greater capabilities.

== See also ==
- Units, formations, and commands
- Staff officer
- Headquarters and service company, USMC equivalent
- Headquarters unit
