= Regiment (United States Army) =

United States Army military unit

A regiment is a military unit that has been in use by the United States Army since its inception. Derived from the concept originating in European armies, a regiment was historically commanded by a colonel, and consisted of ten companies, for a total of approximately 1,000 soldiers. Confusingly, the terms "regiment" and "battalion" were used interchangeably at this time; it was not until later that a battalion was defined as a sub-unit of a regiment. The regiment fulfilled both administrative and tactical functions and was the principal maneuver unit of the US Army until being superseded in the 20th century by the division.

The regiment was retained as a unit in the US Army until after World War II when the Army reorganized under the Pentomic model. In order to give soldiers a sense of unit identity, the Combat Arms Regimental System (CARS) was adopted, later replaced with the U.S. Army Regimental System (USARS). The role of the regiment is currently fulfilled by the brigade and brigade combat team.

== History ==
=== American Revolutionary War ===
The regiment had served as the basic administrative and tactical unit of European armies since the 16th century. In most armies, the regiment would be divided into multiple battalions to improve maneuverability on the battlefield. However in the British Army - which naturally influenced the Continental Army - most regiments only had one battalion. Thus the two terms became synonymous with each other in both armies.

==== Infantry Regiment ====
While each of the Thirteen Colonies had their own method for organizing regiments, when George Washington arrived to take command of the Main Army at the Siege of Boston, he recognized that a more unifying reorganization was needed. Collecting the thoughts of other officers, they presented their findings to Congress, which approved the reorganization on 4 November 1775. There were a few changes over the coming months and the formalization of some positions, but ultimately the infantry regiment of 1776 was commanded by a colonel, lieutenant colonel, and major, with a staff of ten to assist them, and contained eight companies of 90 officers, non-commissioned officers (NCO), and enlisted personnel each, for a regimental strength of 733 total. Where possible the existing regiments were simply reorganized, but it was often required for companies from several regiments be merged together. Regiments were also numbered based on the seniority of their colonel.

In contrast to their British counterparts, in which the colonel was only a nominal position and the lieutenant colonel often detached to serve as a brigadier, all three field officers had command responsibilities within the regiment. The colonel had ultimate tactical and administrative control of the regiment, with the lieutenant colonel and major assisting him. Among the regiment's staff officers and NCOs was the adjutant, responsible for recordkeeping and supervising daily details, assisted by the sergeant major; the quartermaster responsible for housing, feeding, and equipping the troops, and assisted by the quartermaster sergeant; a surgeon and a surgeon's mate responsible for the health of the regiment and screening recruits; a paymaster who oversaw the regiment's finances and ensured the troops were paid; and a drum major and a fife major who oversaw the musicians assigned to the companies. There was also a chaplain assigned to every two regiments, but after June 1776 every regiment had their own chaplain.

On paper, the Continental regiment had an advantage over its British counterpart in the number of rank-and-file it could deploy (640 to 480) and a higher ratio of officers to men. There were exceptions to this organizational principal: the 2nd Canadian Regiment for example organized itself in the French tradition with into four battalions of five 50-man companies each. However, most regiments started 1777 below full strength, and recruiting difficulties (due in part to suspicions of a standing army) meant that by the time the army arrived at Valley Forge, it was recognized that changes were necessary to fit the manpower reality.

After discussions with Washington and his senior advisors, Congress passed legislation on 27 May 1778 that revised the organization of infantry regiments. Regiments retained their colonels, but if lost the position was left vacant; instead, the lieutenant colonel took over as the regiment's commanding officer (known as the lieutenant colonel commandant) supported by the major. Additionally, each field officer took command of a company, replacing its captain. The permanent staff positions of adjutant, quartermaster, and paymaster were also removed. In their place, for extra pay two of the companies' lieutenants and one of its captains were chosen to serve double duty in these roles respectively. The eight line companies were retained but their strength was reduced to 64 total, although a ninth company of light infantry was added. These reforms gave the infantry regiment a total strength of 585 officers and enlisted personnel.

These changes left the infantry regiment weaker than its 1776 version but more financially viable and reflective of the available manpower. Since the British colonel was not a combat position, the field officer changes would make prisoner exchanges easier as well. With the light infantry company frequently detached, the regiment's fighting strength was 448 rank-and-file, closer to that of a British regiment. While Washington understood many of the changes were necessary, he disagreed with forcing line officers to perform staff roles. Another change, thanks to the influence of Baron Von Steuben, was organizing the regiment into two battalions of four companies each and designating a 12-man color guard.

The collapsing American economy impelled Congress to make further cost-saving reforms starting in August 1780; by October a plan had been approved balancing the financial needs with Washington's requests, to go into effect on 1 January 1781. The number of infantry regiments was reduced, but they retained the same number of companies, each of which increased to 78 total. Each company was commanded by its own captain, and the permanent positions of adjutant, quartermaster, and paymaster were reinstated. A new position, the recruiter, was also added to the regiment's staff, along with a fifer and drummer. These three remained in the regiment's home state in order to provide new recruits. Lastly, the number of field officers was returned to three: either a colonel, lieutenant colonel, and major, or a lieutenant colonel commandant and two majors. On paper, the infantry regiment totaled 717 officers and enlisted personnel, increasing its fighting power and making it a more effective unit than its British counterpart.

A final change was made in 1782, as it became clear the war would end soon and Congress continued to seek ways to cut costs. Washington successfully argued against many of their changes, noting that the British still had more Loyalists than he had Continentals and the ratio of officers to enlisted was too low. But in April, Congress once again removed the permanent positions of adjutant, quartermaster, and paymaster, requiring company officers to take on these added responsibilities. Congress partially reversed themselves in November by restoring the adjutant and quartermaster to permanent positions.

=== Civil War ===
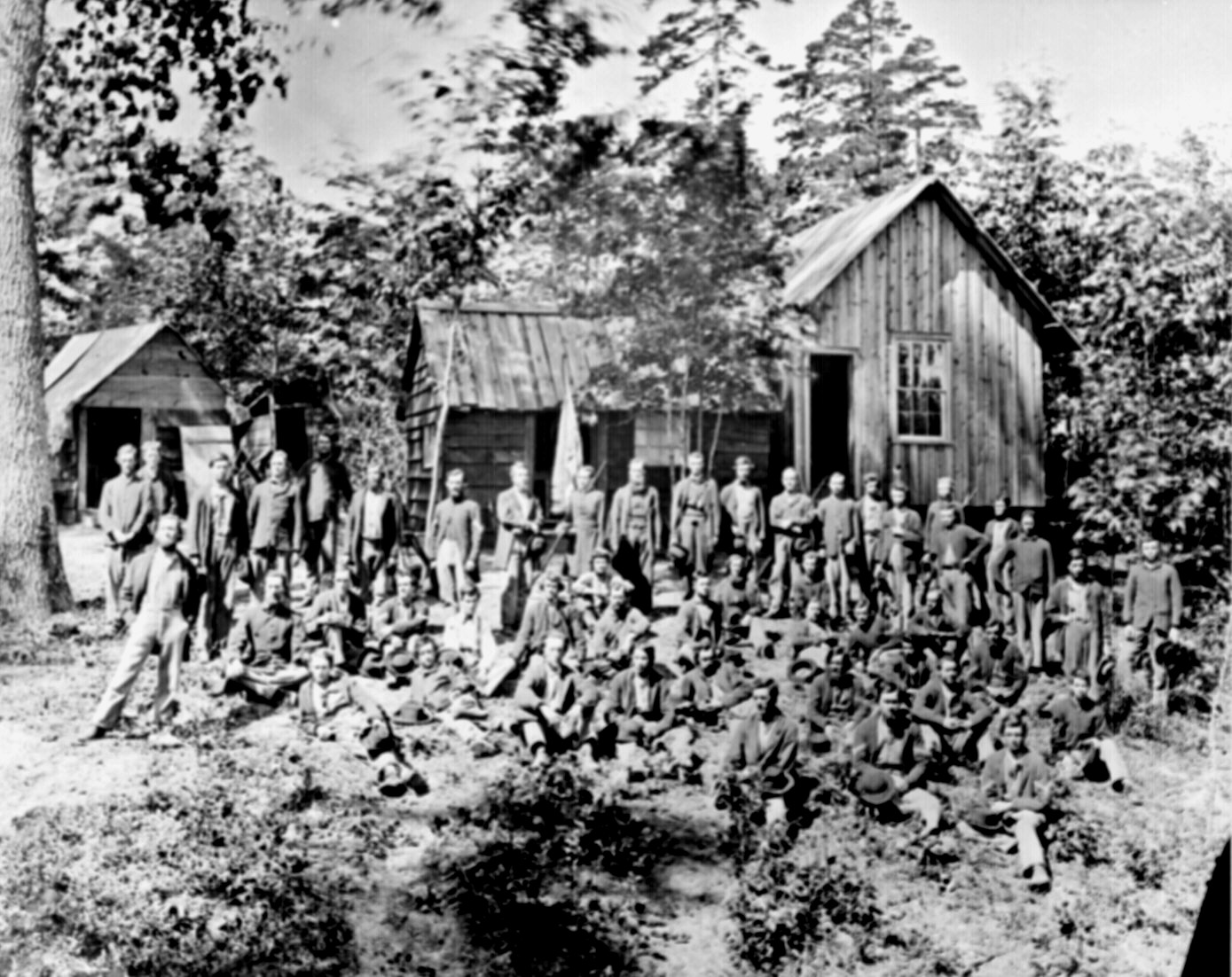
The 21st Michigan Infantry, a regiment serving in the Western Theater.

During the American Civil War the regiment was considered the fundamental unit of recruitment, training and maneuver of the Union Army. However, at the start of the war the Regular Army or United States Army (USA) consisted of just ten regiments of infantry, four regiments of artillery, and five mounted regiments. While the regular army was expanded to meet the challenge of the war, thousands more regiments were raised by the individual states as United States Volunteers (USV). Although modeled after the regular army, there were a number of differences between Regular and Volunteer regiments.

Traditionally, recruitment in Regular Army regiments was handled on an individual unit basis: officers and NCOs were sent out into the area around the regimental headquarters and home station to recruit specifically for their regiment. The General Recruiting Service set up in 1822, with depots in major cities to funnel new recruits to the regiments, supplemented but could not wholly replace this system. Efforts during the Civil War to revitalize the GRS and add incentives to encourage enlistment in the Regular Army increased its size but could not overcome most Americans' desire to serve in the Volunteers.

Volunteer regiments were raised under the authority of their state governor, who encouraged localities to form regiments. This was considered acceptable for what was originally considered to be a short war and also created strong bonds among the men who joined. Governors were also responsible for appointing USV regiments' field officers, and confirming the appointment of junior officers who were elected by the men of their company. In a large sense these appointments were for political purposes as they could be used to strengthen support for local politicians and allowed for the speedy organization of so many new regiments. It also resulted in many incompetent USV officers with no military experience being appointed, especially early in the war. Eventually, as casualties mounted and their constituents' complaints increased, governors took to issuing commissions on the basis of battlefield rather than political competence.

In both instances, once formed a regiment struggled to replenish their ranks as officers sent home to recruit replacements had to contend with governors who preferred to raise new regiments to meet their quotas and the allure of serving in a newly created unit. A regiment might start with 1,000 soldiers, but without even having engaged in combat after six months it might only be able to muster 600 or 700 on account of desertions, illness, leave, detachment on special duty, and other factors. By the time it had seen action, a veteran regiment averaged a little over 400 soldiers, a situation not only accepted as a matter of course but tactically advantageous for its maneuverability and ease of command. One of the benefits offered by the government to induce a long-serving regiment to reenlist was to allow it the official designation of a "veteran" volunteer regiment. Serious efforts were made to replenish regiments back to their full strength, of which Wisconsin did better than the other states, but it remained a clumsy and unpredictable system. Eventually the result for many regiments was that attrition continued to reduce their numbers until they were deemed combat ineffective, whereupon they would be disbanded or consolidated with another unit. Such a fate was deeply resented by the proud survivors of the original regiment and could lead to friction between them and the new unit.

The regimental level was where most logistical work was carried out, and each regiment was authorized a number of staff officers to carry out these functions. Unlike with higher formations where such officers were supposed to come from their respective War Department bureaus, most regimental staff officers were drawn from the junior officers of the line units, while most staff NCOs were drawn from the most experienced NCOs of the regiment. While those with years in the Regular Army were well-versed in their craft, many USV staff officers were inexperienced in their new role and so less effective, although experience gained over time eventually improved their performance. Additionally, while a regiment was authorized staff officers and NCOs to carry out logistical and administrative duties, there were no enlisted personnel assigned specifically to help them carry out their duties. Such duties were instead carried out by line soldiers detailed from their unit or hired civilian workers. The assignment of soldiers to support duty had the unfortunate effect of reducing their unit's combat effectiveness, while civilian contractors tended to be harder to find and retain, were less reliable and more insubordinate.

In addition to their authorized staff, each regiment in the Union Army was allowed to appoint an ordained Christian minister as their chaplain. Chaplain selection was done by the regimental commander, which allowed for some abuse; in one instance a regiment's "chaplain" was actually a French cook. Regiments operating under the U.S. Ambulance Corps were also assigned a number of ambulances to take over the role of casualty evacuation from the regimental musicians.

==== Infantry Regiment ====
Before the war, the ten original infantry regiments of the Regular Army (1st through 10th) were all authorized ten companies and a regimental staff consisting of a colonel, lieutenant colonel, two majors, an adjutant, quartermaster, quartermaster sergeant, sergeant major, a principal or chief musician and two musicians. This gave them an authorized aggregate strength of up to 878 soldiers.

After the war started, nine new infantry regiments (11th through 19th) were created in 1861 but organized differently from the "old" regiments. Each "new" regiment was authorized a colonel and lieutenant colonel and between two and three battalions, with a battalion to consist of eight companies each and its own staff. The regimental staff included an adjutant, quartermaster/commissary, drum major, two principal musicians, and a regimental band of twenty-four musicians. Supposing a full three-battalion regiment, the aggregate strength would be between 2,020 and 2,452 depending on the size of the battalions.

Volunteer regiments were authorized ten companies with a colonel, lieutenant colonel, major, adjutant, quartermaster, surgeon, assistant surgeon, chaplain, sergeant major, quartermaster sergeant, commissary sergeant, hospital steward, two principal musicians, and a regimental band of twenty-four musicians. With full-strength companies, a Volunteer regiment had an aggregate strength of 1,046 soldiers. The regimental band was later removed and a second assistant surgeon added.

The regimental color guard, charged with protecting the regimental colors, was to consist of a sergeant and eight corporals chosen by the colonel. Positioned in the center of the regiment when deployed in line for battle, it was considered a great honor to be picked for the color guard. The regiment's colors had great significance as it embodied the regiment's history and accomplishments. Many had also been constructed and presented to the regiment by their local community's women and so represented their homes. As it was the most visible marker of a regiment's position, the color guard was also a dangerous position as the enemy would direct their fire at it.

==== Cavalry Regiment ====
Prior to the Civil War, the Regular Army had five regiments of mounted soldiers, divided between cavalry, dragoons and mounted infantry. Dragoons were cavalry who primarily fought dismounted; mounted riflemen fought similarly but were armed with rifles instead of carbines or muskets. The 1st and 2nd Dragoons, the Regiment of Mounted Riflemen, and the 1st and 2nd Cavalry regiments, despite their different mission profiles, were similarly organized. Each regiment consisted of ten companies and was commanded by a colonel, lieutenant colonel and two majors. The regimental staff included an adjutant, quartermaster (both chosen from among the regiment's lieutenants), sergeant major, quartermaster sergeant, chief musician and two buglers.

In May 1861, Congress authorized the addition of a sixth mounted regiment, the 3rd Cavalry, and organized it (and, starting in July, all subsequent Volunteer cavalry regiments) along different lines. Besides a colonel and lieutenant colonel there were three majors, each in command of a battalion with its own staff composed of two squadrons and each squadron composed of two companies, for a total of twelves companies. The regiment's staff included an adjutant and a regimental quartermaster/commissary (both chosen from among the regiment's lieutenants), a surgeon, an assistant surgeon, and two chief buglers. With all battalions full this gave the regiment a strength of 1,278 men.

The next month, Congress made the controversial decision to redesignate the Regular Army's mounted regiments, naming them all Cavalry and numbering them based on their seniority (1st-6th). The decision was not popular among the former dragoons and mounted riflemen who saw the decision as erasing their storied histories. They were allowed to maintain some of their traditions however, such as the continued wearing of their old uniforms (with their distinctive facings) until they wore out.

A year later, in July 1862, the organization of all cavalry regiments were streamlined by removing the permanent battalion and squadron structure and the staff who went along with it. Each regiment consisted of twelve companies (renamed troops) and its command and staff personnel included a colonel, lieutenant colonel, three majors, a surgeon, assistant surgeon, adjutant, quartermaster, commissary, sergeant major, quartermaster sergeant, commissary sergeant, two hospital stewards, a saddler sergeant, chief trumpeter, and chief farrier/blacksmith. With the changes to the units it commanded, this gave the regiment a total strength of 1,361. As before, the regimental adjutant, quartermaster and commissary were chosen from among the regiment's lieutenants.

A final organizational change was issued in April 1863, removing the chief farrier/blacksmith and adding a veterinary surgeon to the regimental staff. The troops likewise underwent changes, with a minimum and maximum number of troopers per unit. The end result was that a cavalry regiment at full strength now could have between 1,040 and 1,156 men.

==== Artillery Regiment ====
During the Civil War, artillery in the Union Army was divided into three categories. Heavy artillery controlled large-calibre artillery and were typically used to garrison forts or set up in entrenchments. When in the field they had charge over the siege train and were armed, equipped, drilled and employed as infantry. Field artillery were equipped with lighter-calibre artillery that could be pulled by horses to provide artillery support for infantry. Field artillery soldiers were primarily armed with pistols and cutlasses and except for the drivers and Chiefs of Pieces they would march on foot alongside the cannons. They could ride on the limbers and caissons but this was reserved for emergencies as doing so weighed down the horses. Horse artillery was the same as field artillery except all soldiers were mounted on horses, making them highly mobile and able to support cavalry with artillery fire.

The four artillery regiments of the Regular Army (1st, 2nd, 3rd and 4th) were all organized similarly with twelve companies. The regiment was commanded by a colonel, with a lieutenant colonel, two majors, an adjutant, quartermaster, sergeant major and quartermaster sergeant; the adjutant and quartermaster were chosen from among the unit's lieutenants. The regiments were originally organized as heavy artillery, with two companies per regiment equipped as field artillery, but within the first year of the war they had largely transformed into a combination of field and horse artillery.

In May 1861, Congress authorized the creation of a 5th Artillery Regiment which was organized differently from the first four. While also containing twelve companies these were termed batteries. The regiment's command and staff consisted of a colonel, lieutenant colonel, three majors, an adjutant, quartermaster, sergeant major, commissary sergeant, quartermaster sergeant, two principal musicians, a hospital steward and a band of twenty-four musicians. Volunteer artillery regiments raised for Federal service were organized along the same lines as the 5th Artillery.

One significant difference between artillery and the other combat arms was that, while infantry and cavalry regiments were both tactical and administrative units, artillery regiments were strictly administrative and exerted no battlefield control over their constituent batteries. For this reason many of the Regular regiments left these positions unfilled during the war. Likewise, the states raised over two hundred individual batteries for federal service, versus approximately forty-six regiments and three battalions. All but ten of the individual batteries were organized as field artillery, while only eleven of the regiments and two of the battalions were organized as field artillery, the rest being heavy artillery. This composition was mimicked in the United States Colored Troops' fourteen artillery regiments, with all of but one formed as heavy artillery.

== See also ==
- Regimental Combat Team
