= Brigade (United States Army) =

United States Army military unit

A brigade is a military formation utilized by the United States Army since its creation as the Continental Army. The brigade traces its origins to the British Army of the 15th century as a temporary formation to control multiple regiments when necessary. The US Army also maintained this status until the middle of the 20th century, when the first permanent brigades were formed. Traditionally brigades were composed of all one combat arm (infantry, cavalry, etc.) but with their permanent creation they evolved into combined arms formations.

A brigade was historically commanded by a brigadier general and composed of several regiments, but is currently commanded by a colonel and composed of several battalions. In the US Army, maneuver brigades are composed of combat arms units which directly engage the enemy, while support brigades provide administrative and logistical support. Between three and six brigades in total form a division.

== History ==
=== American Revolutionary War ===
The history of US Army brigades began during the American War of Independence when, at the Siege of Boston, George Washington arrived to take command and reorganize the Patriot forces. Washington introduced both the division and brigade to act as echelons of command between his headquarters and the various regiments. Each division had three infantry brigades, and each brigade was composed of six regiments with oversight over a section of the siege lines. A brigader general commanded each brigade, assisted by a "brigade major" who acted as his assistant. The brigades at this time each had approximately 2,500 men each.

Going into 1776, the infantry brigades operating under Washington's Main Army were reduced to four or five regiments, although on average they were the same size as before on account of regiments' larger size. However, by the end of the year, attrition in the Army had reduced all but two brigades to below the official strength of a regiment. The average size of a brigade in December 1776 was 1,400 men. One positive change was assigning an artillery company to each brigade to provide fire support, an innovation that proved so successful at Trenton and Princeton that it became standard in the Main Army. The brigade support company was armed with between two to four cannons, with the ideal number being two six-pounders, although these pieces required the largest crews of 12 to 15 men each. It was also preferred that they came from the same state as their parent brigade's regiments.

Starting in 1777, Washington planned for each infantry brigade to have three full-strength regiments, for over 2,200 men total. However, political disagreements in Congress forced Washington to adjust to the available number of officers and actual strength of regiments. He created ten permanent brigades for the Main Army, each with four to five regiments (again, ideally all from the same state). In May, Congress added to the brigade staff by authorizing a brigade chaplain, who replaced the regimental chaplains. By December, the Main Army had grown so that Washington could deploy seventeen brigades for battle: ten in the First Line, six in the Second Line, and the last in reserve.

Following the reorganization at Valley Forge and official establishment of the American Army by Congress on May 27, 1778, the permanent brigade structure was codified as containing several infantry regiments and a supporting artillery company. Washington had wanted to further expand the brigade staff with several officers, but Congress only authorized the addition of a quartermaster. Nevertheless, with the authorization of an office of the inspector general, Washington saw fit to introduce the position of brigade inspector who — besides maintaining the books and ensuring that regulations were being followed — absorbed many of the functions of the brigade major. This made him the senior staff officer of the brigade, though he was technically outside the chain of command.

In February 1779 Congress formally authorized the brigade inspector as part of the brigade staff, reducing brigade major to that of aide-de-camp and adding a second aide. Later on, Washington directed that each brigade should have appointed a conductor of military stores in charge of caring for its weapons, with assistants chosen from among the regiments. This gave the brigadier general two aides as his personal staff, a brigade inspector acting as a chief of staff, an administrative section, a logistical section commanded by a brigade commissary and brigade quartermaster, and a maintenance section commanded by the conductor of military stores. A further reorganization in 1781 saw brigades reduced from four to three regiments, but with the larger regiment size they maintained the same combat power. However, when the Siege of Yorktown began the average brigade had only 1,000 men in total.

After the war the Militia Acts of 1792 specified that "each brigade should consist of four regiments; each regiment of two battalions; each battalion of five companies".

=== American Civil War ===
Brigades achieved prominence during the Civil War as over 200 were established by the Union Army to fight the Confederate States Army. After early experiments at combined arms, all Union brigades consisted of just one combat arm. Brigades were numbered based on their position within their parent division, but could also acquire nicknames even when this designation changed. Famous examples included the Iron Brigade and the Irish Brigade. Brigades also used distinctive identifying flags for the first time during the Civil War. An initial generic design was eventually replaced with a triangular flag which would have the symbol of their parent corps and be color-coded to designate brigade and division numbering within the corps.

Nominally, brigades were commanded by brigadier generals, but due to gaps in the Union command hierarchy many brigades were instead commanded by the most senior regimental colonel (often breveted to the rank of brigadier general). Staff officers authorized to a brigade included an assistant adjutant general, an assistant quartermaster/ordnance officer, an assistant commissary of subsistence (all with the rank of Captain) and a surgeon. However, there were no enlisted personnel assigned to help staff officers carry out their tasks. Instead, these duties were carried out soldiers and non-commissioned officers detailed from their subordinate units or hired civilian laborers (including so-called "contraband" or freed slaves).

Infantry brigades could have as few as two or as many as twelve regiments, though on average they consisted of four regiments. At minimum Union commanders sought to keep infantry brigades to a strength of at least 2,000 soldiers, which due to an inadequate replacement system often meant adding additional regiments to a brigade. By the Battle of Chancellorsville in 1863, a 2,000-strong brigade averaged 4.7 regiments, but a year later at the Battle of Cold Harbor such a unit averaged 5.5 regiments. When a brigade was deployed in a battle line, the standard spacing was twenty-two paces between regiments, although in actual practice such intervals were rarely maintained. General William T. Sherman believed that a brigade of 3,000 was needed to occupy a front of one mile, though 5,000 or more could be packed into that mile to make the line stronger.

Cavalry brigades could range from two to eight regiments, though like the infantry they too averaged four regiments. However, early in the war individual cavalry regiments were attached to infantry divisions to be used as their commander saw fit, often as escorts, orderlies and pickets. It was not until July 1862 when cavalry in the Army of the Potomac were organized into separate brigades, although they remained under the army commander's control and often used for the same tasks. When the Cavalry Corps was formed in February 1863, cavalry were freed to operate as independent units, with three to five brigades forming dedicated cavalry divisions.

At the start of the war field artillery was not organized into brigades; instead, individual batteries were attached to infantry brigades to provide support. However this only served to dilute their firepower as demonstrated at the First Battle of Bull Run, after which they were reassigned from brigades to divisions. By the time of the Battle of Gettysburg artillery was organized into their own brigades, with each army corps assigned one and the rest organized under a general artillery reserve. Each brigade had anywhere from four to eight batteries, at least one of which was a Regular Army unit, with six being the most common. Artillery brigades also had their own commanding officer, often a colonel but sometimes a junior officers. The commander was also authorized a staff of an adjutant, quartermaster, commissary officer, ordnance officer, medical officer and artillery inspector, with one or more assistants assigned to each.

=== World Wars ===
During World War I, the United States Army formed its divisions as square divisions of four infantry or cavalry regiments in two infantry or cavalry brigades and three artillery regiments in one artillery brigade. The US Army reorganized as triangular divisions of three infantry regiments and "division artillery" of three 105 mm howitzer battalions and one 155mm battalion from late 1939 to early 1942.

After the army's conversion to the triangular division, only two separate brigades were formed during World War II, the 1st Airborne Infantry Brigade and the 2nd Airborne Infantry Brigade both formed in 1943. The 2nd Airborne Infantry Brigade was formed at Camp Mackall, North Carolina on 20 June 1943 and included the 507th Parachute Infantry Regiment and the 508th Infantry Regiment.

=== Cold War ===
On 16 December 1960, the Army Chief of Staff directed a reappraisal of division organization. Resulting studies were carried out between January and April 1961, and fully implemented by 1965. The resulting Reorganization Objective Army Division (ROAD) program shifted all types of divisions (Mechanized, Airborne, Armor, Infantry and Cavalry) to an identical structure of three brigades of three (sometimes four) battalions.

=== Gulf War ===
During the Gulf War, the organization of maneuver brigades depended on whether they were part of a 'light' division or 'heavy' division. Those of the light divisions would have three infantry battalions, while in heavy divisions a brigade might have three to four mechanized infantry or tank battalions. While they were kept separate for administrative purposes, in combat it was common to form battalion task forces by having units swap with each other (i.e. a tank battalion might replace a company with one from a mechanized infantry battalion). Maneuver brigades otherwise fought together as a cohesive unit, often with other units assigned to it from its parent division (i.e. a battery from the division's air defense artillery battalion might be attached).

== See also ==
- Brigade insignia of the United States Army
- Brigade combat team
