= Company (United States Army) =

United States Army military unit

A company is a military unit of the United States Army which has been in use since the American Revolutionary War. It has historically been commanded by a captain, assisted by a first sergeant as the senior-most non-commissioned officer (NCO), and consisted of approximately one hundred soldiers. Soldiers were divided between three and five platoons of around thirty each and led by a lieutenant. However the exact size and composition of a company has varied depending on the time period and its role.

Companies in the US Army may be categorized as maneuver companies, the combat arms (infantry, tanks, artillery, etc.) which directly engage the enemy in combat, and support companies which provide administrative and logistical support to the combat arms in carrying out their mission. Companies normally operate as part of a parent battalion or regiment, however they may also be organized as independent companies. Such units are typically specialized forces such as military police or medical personnel. In both cases though, companies require support from higher formations as they are not meant to conduct independent operations.

In the US Army, company-sized units of cavalry and artillery are referred to as a troops and batteries, respectively.

== History ==
=== American Revolutionary War ===
In the initial European tradition, a regiment's companies were purely administrative units, with soldiers organized separately into platoons during battle. By the 18th century though, the company and platoon were being used interchangeably in most armies. As the Thirteen Colonies took shape, they formed militia companies for fighting against both the Native Americans and other European colonizers.

==== Infantry Company ====
Infantry units in the Continental Army were initially structured based on which colony they originated from, but when George Washington took command of the Main Army during the Siege of Boston, a reorganization took place which was approved by Congress on 4 November 1775. The new line infantry company consisted of a captain with a first lieutenant, a second lieutenant, an ensign, four sergeants, four corporals, a fifer, a drummer, and 76 privates. With a total strength of 90 men, the company was much stronger than what most colonies originally had while maintaining a sufficient ratio of officers and NCOs to enlisted. It could be subdivided into four squads, each with a sergeant, a corporal, and 19 privates. The ensign was the most junior of the company's officers, tasked with seeing to the dress and cleanliness of the company and with carrying the regimental colors on a rotating basis. The fifer and drummer signaled orders that could be heard over the din of battle and the daily routines when in camp, but their other responsibilities included casualty evacuation, corporal punishment, and maintaining the regimental guardroom.

By the time the Main Army wintered at Valley Forge, attrition and recruiting difficulties meant many infantry units were below their paper strength, and Congress needed to find ways to save money. A new company organization was authorized on 27 May 1778 which significantly reduced its size. The number of sergeants and corporals was reduced to three each, and the number of privates to 53 men. Additionally, the regiment's field officers replaced the captain in two or three of the line companies (the senior-most lieutenant exercised practical control over the colonel's company as captain-lieutenant), while some company officers had to serve double duty on the regiment's staff. A permanent company of light infantry was added to the regiment, having the same organization as the line infantry, but it was often detached to serve on other assignments.

By 1781, further financial difficulties encouraged Congress to make more reductions, but thanks to the Washington's influence, the infantry company increased in size to 78 while the number of regiments were reduced. The company grew to 64 privates and reinstated the sergeant and corporal that were previously removed. A fifth sergeant, officially designated as the company's first sergeant, was also added. Each line company had its own captain again as field officers no longer doubled as company commanders and company officers no longer had to fill in the staff roles. While not recapturing the strength of the 1776 organization, this change did increase the company's firepower and made command easier.

=== Civil War ===
During the American Civil War the company was considered the smallest military unit of the Union Army. The exact size and composition, however, depended not only on to which combat arm it belonged, but whether it was part of the Regular Army (USA) or raised by the individual states as United States Volunteers (USV).

==== Infantry company ====
Infantry companies which belonged to the Regular Army's ten original regiments (1st through 10th) were authorized a captain, a first lieutenant, a second lieutenant, four sergeants (one of whom was first sergeant), four corporals, two musicians, and 42 privates (some regiments were authorized up to 72 privates per company). After the war started, nine new infantry regiments (11th through 19th) were created and authorized companies with a slightly different structure, adding a fifth sergeant, four additional corporals, and between 64 and 82 privates, for a total of between 82 and 100 personnel.

Infantry companies in the Volunteer Army mirrored the "new" Regular companies but added a wagoner, bringing their total to between 83 and 101 personnel. The wagoner was in charge of the company's supply wagon, although during the war supply wagons were organized into trains placed under the control of regimental and higher commands.

A company could be further divided into smaller sub-units, although these were rarely used in actual battle (with the exception of skirmishing) given the linear tactics of the time. One company could split into two platoons, with each divided into two sections and each section into two squads. The smallest sub-unit were "comrades in battle" or the four men adjacent to each other in the line of battle. Conversely, two companies operating together were considered a division.

==== Cavalry company ====
Prior to the Civil War, the Regular Army's mounted soldiers were divided between cavalry, dragoons and mounted infantry. Dragoons were cavalry who primarily fought dismounted while mounted riflemen fought similarly but were armed with rifles instead of carbines or muskets. Despite these differences the companies for all three were similarly organized: a captain, a first lieutenant, a second lieutenant, four sergeants, four corporals, two musicians, two farrier/blacksmiths, and a hundred privates (although just sixty-four for mounted riflemen).

In May 1861, Congress authorized the addition of a new mounted regiment, the 3rd Cavalry, for the Regular Army; this was followed in July with authorization for the raising of Volunteer cavalry regiments. Each company in these formations was similar to the "old" company with the addition of a first sergeant, a quartermaster sergeant, four additional corporals, a saddler, a wagoner, and between 56 and 72 privates, for a total of between 79 and 95 personnel. Saddlers were responsible for keeping the horse-equipment of the company under repair; while not responsible for ordinary military duty they were to be instructed in it all the same in case of necessity.

A year later, the organization of all cavalry forces were streamlined and companies were officially renamed troops. Each troop consisted of a captain, a first lieutenant, two second lieutenants (one of them a supernumerary), a first sergeant, a commissary sergeant, five sergeants, eight corporals, two teamsters, two farriers/blacksmiths, a saddler, a wagoner, and seventy-eight privates. A final organizational change was issued in April 1863, removing the supernumerary second lieutenant and the teamsters and adding two trumpeters to each troop.

==== Artillery company ====
The four artillery regiments of the Regular Army (1st, 2nd, 3rd and 4th) were all organized similarly with twelve companies, each company composed of a captain, two first lieutenants, two second lieutenants, four sergeants, four corporals, two musicians, two artificers, and forty-two privates (sixty-four if organized as field artillery). In May 1861, Congress authorized the creation of a 5th Artillery Regiment and the raising of Volunteer artillery forces which were organized differently from the first four. Their companies (officially termed batteries now) were each authorized a captain, first lieutenant, second lieutenant, first sergeant, quartermaster sergeant, four sergeants, eight corporals, two musicians, two artificers, a wagoner, and between fifty-eight and one hundred twenty-two privates. The battery could be expanded with an additional first lieutenant, second lieutenant, two sergeants, four corporals, and four artificers.

Each battery had four, six or eight cannons, with a sergeant designated as Chief of Piece for each cannon and corporals assigned as gunners; two cannons were together organized as a section and commanded by a lieutenant. There was further differentiation between batteries depending on whether they consisted of heavy artillery, field artillery or horse artillery.

- Heavy artillery controlled large-calibre artillery and were typically used to garrison forts or set up in entrenchments. When in the field they had charge over the siege train and were armed, equipped, drilled and employed as infantry.
- Field artillery were equipped with lighter-calibre artillery that could be pulled by horses using limbers to provide artillery support for infantry. Each cannon would be pulled by a team of six or eight horses depending on its weight and be accompanied by one or two caissons carrying ammunition. A standard six-gun 12-pounder battery at full complement would consist of twelve caissons, a traveling forge, a battery wagon carrying supplies, 110 horses (inc. ten spares), 150 soldiers and 1,218 artillery rounds. Additional wagons, forges, etc. would accompany the battery if it were operating independently. Field artillery soldiers were primarily armed with pistols and cutlasses and except for the drivers and Chiefs of Pieces they would march on foot alongside the cannons. They could ride on the limbers and caissons but this was reserved for emergencies as doing so weighed down the horses.
- Horse artillery was the same as field artillery except all soldiers were mounted on horses, making them highly mobile and able to support cavalry with artillery fire. A full complement for a horse artillery battery was the same as a field artillery battery with the addition of two soldiers and twelve horses (one a spare) per cannon.

==== Engineer company ====
The United States Army Corps of Engineers had a single company of combat engineers when the civil war began. Engineer Company A had been originally created by an act of Congress at the start of the Mexican–American War. It was organized with ten sergeants (master-workmen), ten corporals (overseers), two musicians, sixty-four first-class privates (artificers) and sixty-four second-class privates (laborers). In August 1861 Congress authorized the formation of three more companies to be organized the same as Engineer Company A, with all four organized into a single battalion (the US Engineer Battalion, later 1st Engineer Battalion).

While trained engineers were required for complex tasks such as constructing pontoon bridges, most engineering work could be carried out by regular soldiers under supervision. For these purposes Union armies would detach soldiers from their normal duties to form company-sized units of pioneers. Their typical tasks during a campaign were to repair roads and clear obstacles for advancing forces, or to bury the dead after a battle.

== See also ==
- Headquarters and headquarters company
