= Battalion (United States Army) =

United States Army military unit

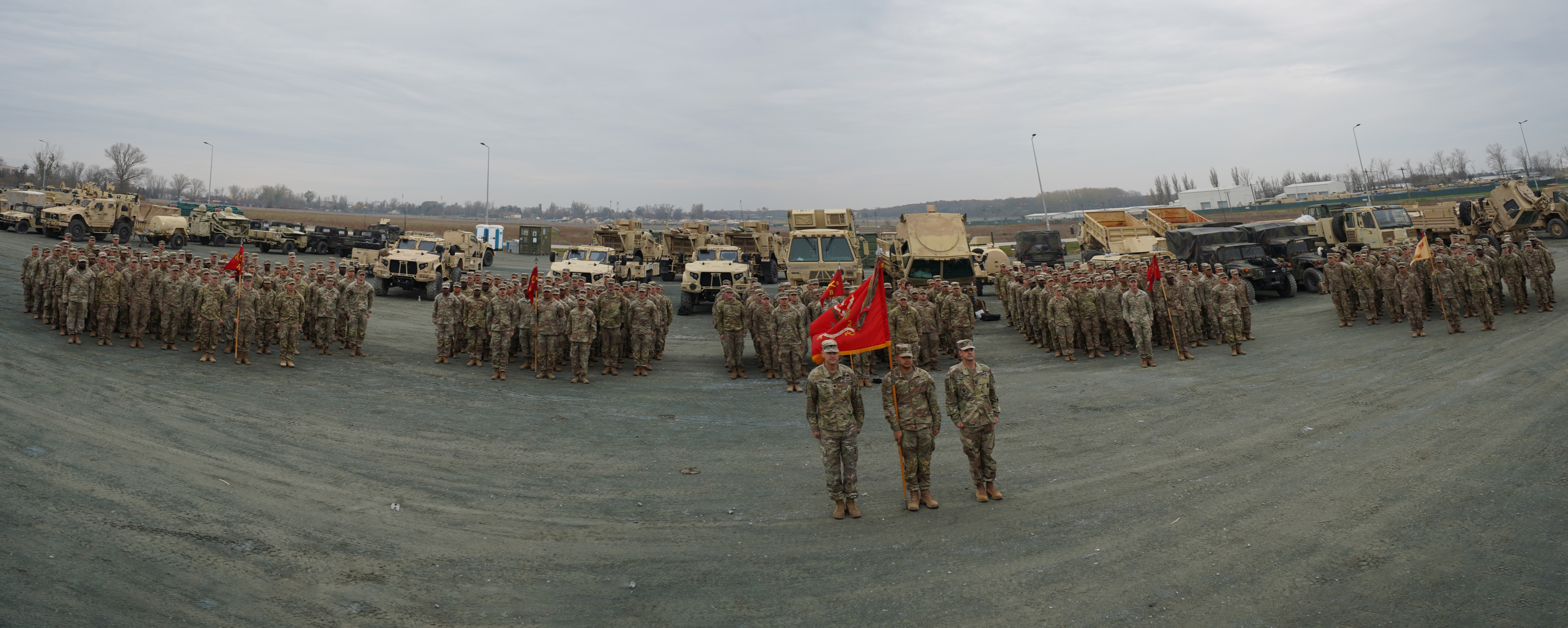
5th Battalion, 25th Field Artillery Regiment at Mihail Kogălniceanu Air Base

A battalion is a military unit used by the United States Army since it was first formed. It has traditionally been commanded by a lieutenant colonel, assisted by a command sergeant major as the highest-ranking non-commissioned officer (NCO). With a dedicated headquarters unit and supporting military staff, the battalion is considered the smallest unit capable of independent operation due to its organic administrative and logistical capabilities.

Battalions are typically composed of between four and seven companies, with between 300 and 1,200 soldiers total. In the past, several battalions would be grouped together to form a regiment, but from the middle of the 20th century on they have instead been grouped into brigades or brigade combat teams. In recent years, the US Army has made use of battalion-sized task forces customized around specific missions.

An equivalent-sized unit of cavalry (including modern cavalry) is referred to as a squadron.

== History ==
=== American Revolutionary War ===
During the 18th century, the battalion developed as the basic unit of maneuver on the European battlefield for controlling multiple companies at once. In most armies, a regiment was divided into two or more battalions, but in the British Army the regiment and battalion were usually synonymous. This tradition was mostly continued in the nascent Continental Army. One exception was the 2nd Canadian Regiment, which organized itself in the French tradition of dividing into four battalions of five 50-man companies each. The 13th Pennsylvania Regiment as also initially organized into two battalions.

One major change occurred with the publication of Regulations for the Order and Discipline of the Troops of the United States by Baron von Steuben. Combining European and American practices, von Steuben reorganized the regiment into two four-company battalions. Additionally, when not used as skirmishers, the regiment's permanent light infantry company was often detached to form provisional battalions. Such units could be combined further to form special strike forces.

=== Civil War ===
When the American Civil War began, the Union Army had no set defined battalion structure, only that any two or more companies making up a regiment was defined as a battalion. Sometimes if a regiment only consisted of between four and eight companies, it would be referred to as a battalion.

However, when Congress authorized the raising of nine new infantry regiments of the Regular Army (11th through 19th) shortly after the war began, they were formally organized with two or three battalions of eight companies each. Each battalion was led by a major with a staff consisting of an adjutant, quartermaster/commissary, sergeant major, quartermaster sergeant, commissary sergeant and Hospital Steward. Depending on the size of the companies, a battalion was authorized between 663 and 807 personnel total. The battalion's adjutant and quartermaster/commissary were chosen from among the lieutenants of its subordinate companies. This structure was based on the system being used by the French Army at the time, whereby two battalions would operate in the field while the third remained at the regimental depot to train and recruit. Lorenzo Thomas, Adjutant-General of the US Army, recommended that the three-battalion system also be adopted by the pre-existing infantry regiments of the Regular Army and the regiments of United States Volunteers being raised by the states. However, it was decided not to do so in part as it might confuse an American populace more familiar with the older system.

In July 1861, when Congress authorized the addition of a new mounted regiment for the Regular Army (3rd Cavalry) and the raising of Volunteer cavalry regiments, they did adopt the three-battalion structure for these new units. Each battalion would be commanded by a major and consist of two squadrons, each squadron composed of two companies. The battalion staff included an adjutant, a quartermaster/commissary (chosen from among the battalion's lieutenants), a sergeant major, a quartermaster sergeant, a commissary sergeant, a hospital steward, a saddler sergeant and a veterinary sergeant. This gave the cavalry battalion a minimum strength of 325 and a maximum strength of 389 depending on the size of its companies. The saddler sergeant oversaw the saddlers assigned to each company and acted as the master saddler or foreman when they were all assembled together as a repair shop.

The purpose of this organization was so that a cavalry regiment could divide itself into three autonomous parts, allowing each to operate independently of the other, as they had before the war. However, when the regiment operated together the battalion structure proved to be cumbersome and over-officered, especially after regiments were frequently reduced to a fraction of their authorized size by attrition. A year later, the organization of all cavalry units were streamlined and the permanent battalion structure was removed, with some of the supporting staff moved up to the regimental headquarters. Although the permanent structure was removed, cavalry companies continued to operate as squadrons and battalions in the field.

In August 1861, Congress approved the creation of the US Engineer Battalion at an authorized strength of four companies with 150 engineers each. Later in June 1864, they authorized the addition of a sergeant-major and a quartermaster sergeant to the battalion. However, there were no staff officers assigned to the battalion, requiring company officers to pull double-duty, and the battalion remained far short of its authorized strength until they were permitted to recruit directly from Volunteer units. During the war, the battalion was commanded by a number of different officers and operated as part of the Army of the Potomac's Engineer Brigade. Their main task was constructing roads, pontoon bridges and fortifications, often under fire, although on occasion they also fought as infantry.
