= US Army Logistical Commands =

US Army supply-and-support units

United States Army Logistical Commands were created after the end of World War II and would serve into the US Army's Pentomic Era, specifically from the post World War II Era through the post Korean War era to support the Regimental Combat Teams. The command's main emphasis was the operation of depots and ports. They supported the various units in their assigned region with supply and transportation of supplies from port embarkation areas to the front line troop units. There were 28 Logistical Commands, 8 serving active duty mainly in the Pacific and Europe and 20 serving Reserve and National Guard units.

== Commands ==
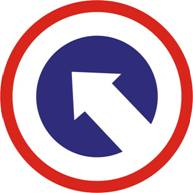
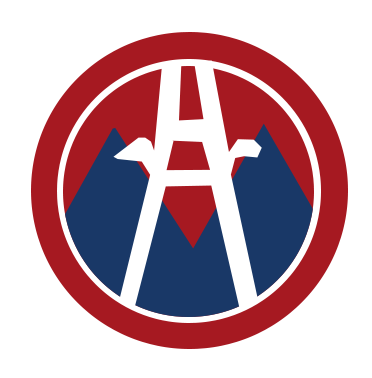
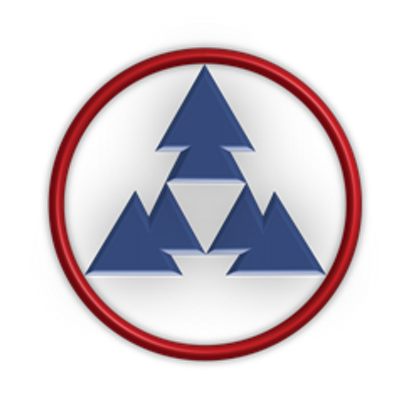
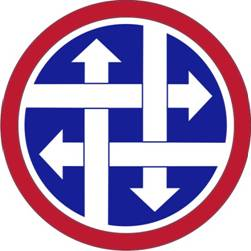
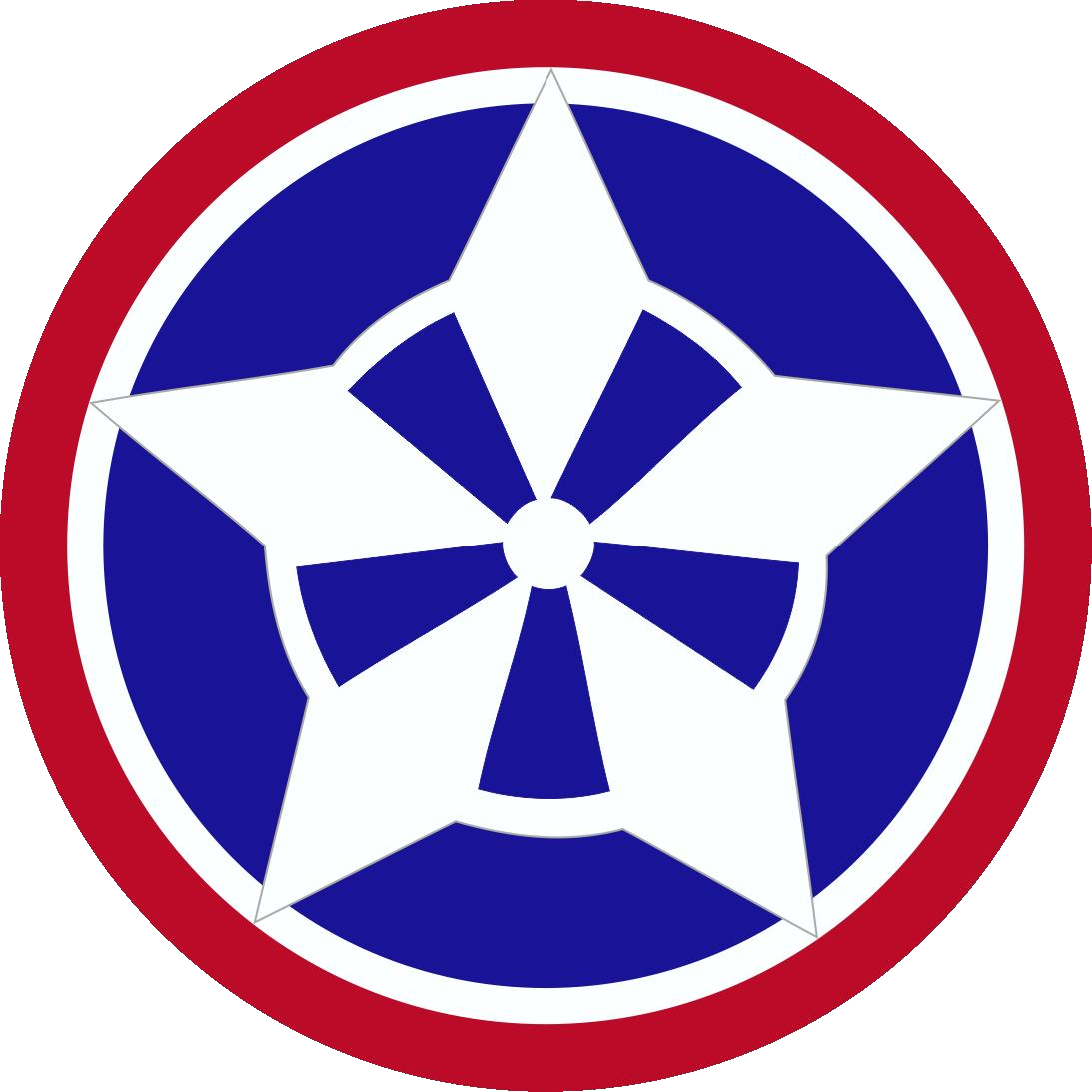
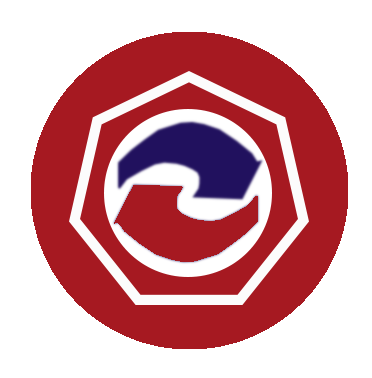
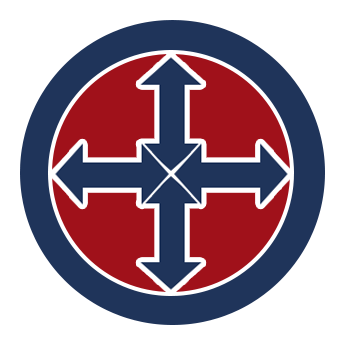
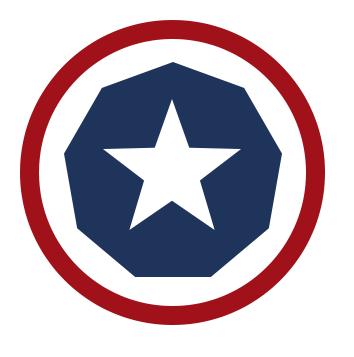
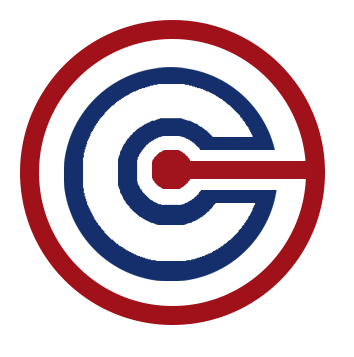
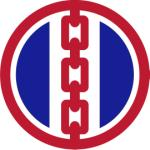
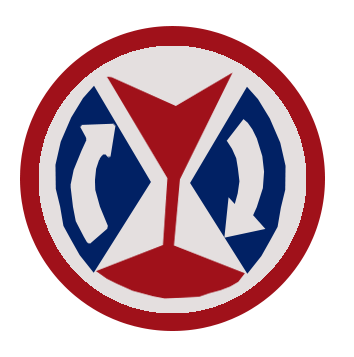
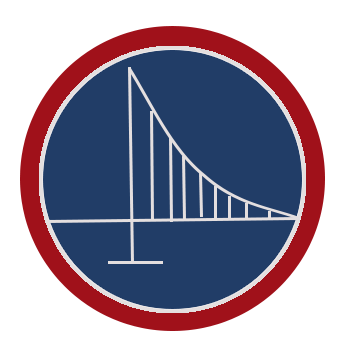
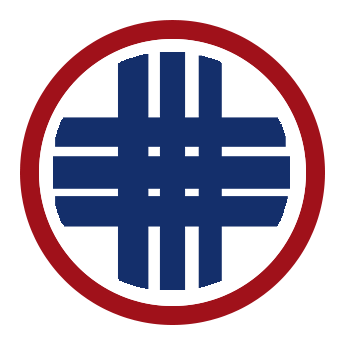
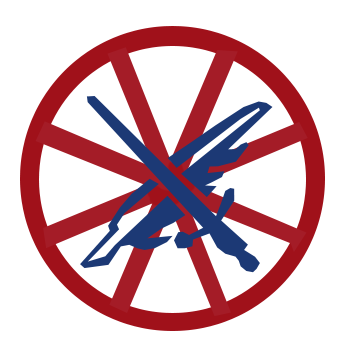
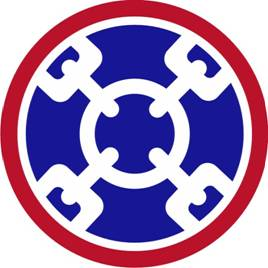
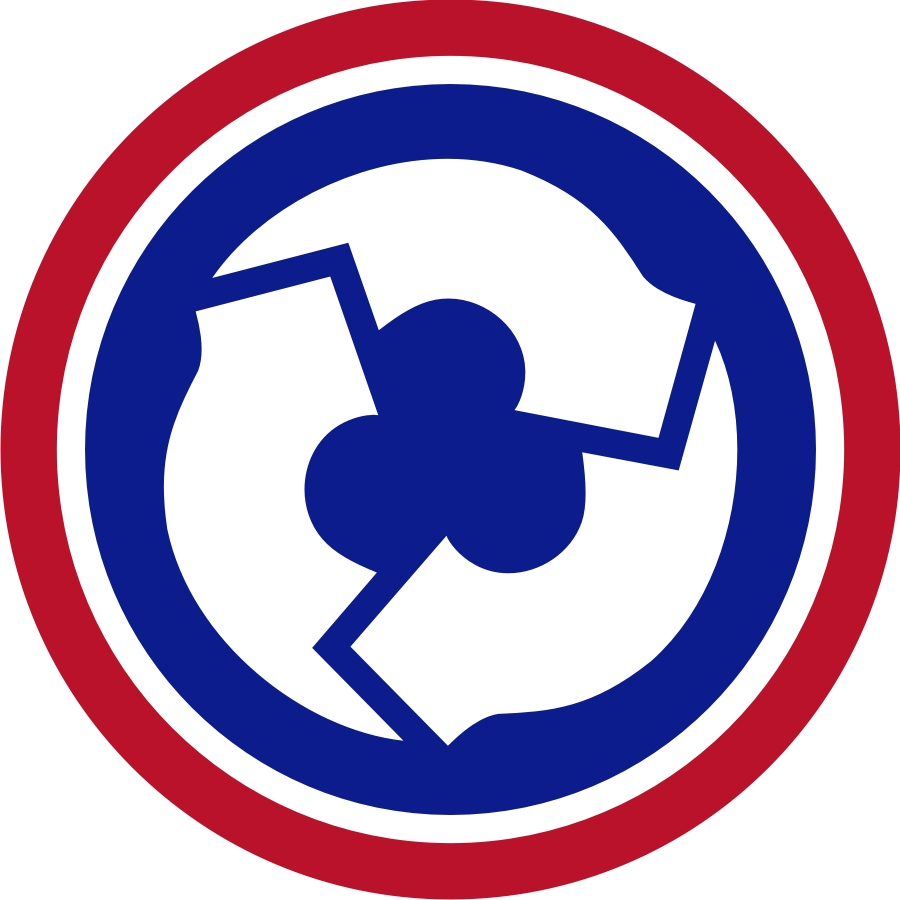
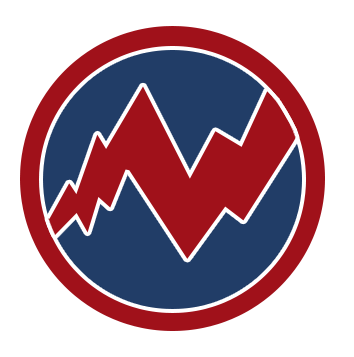
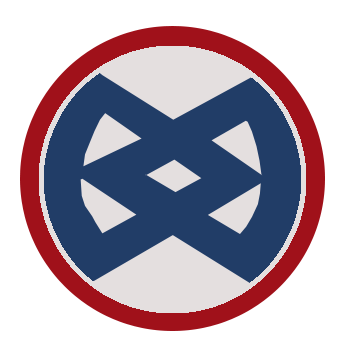
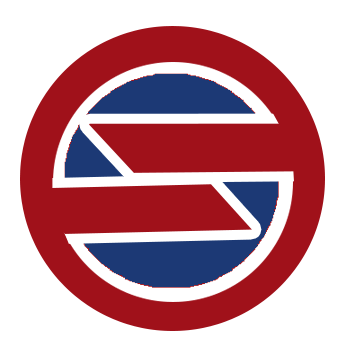
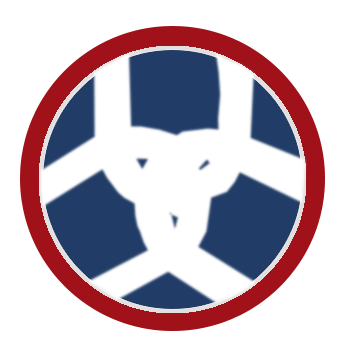
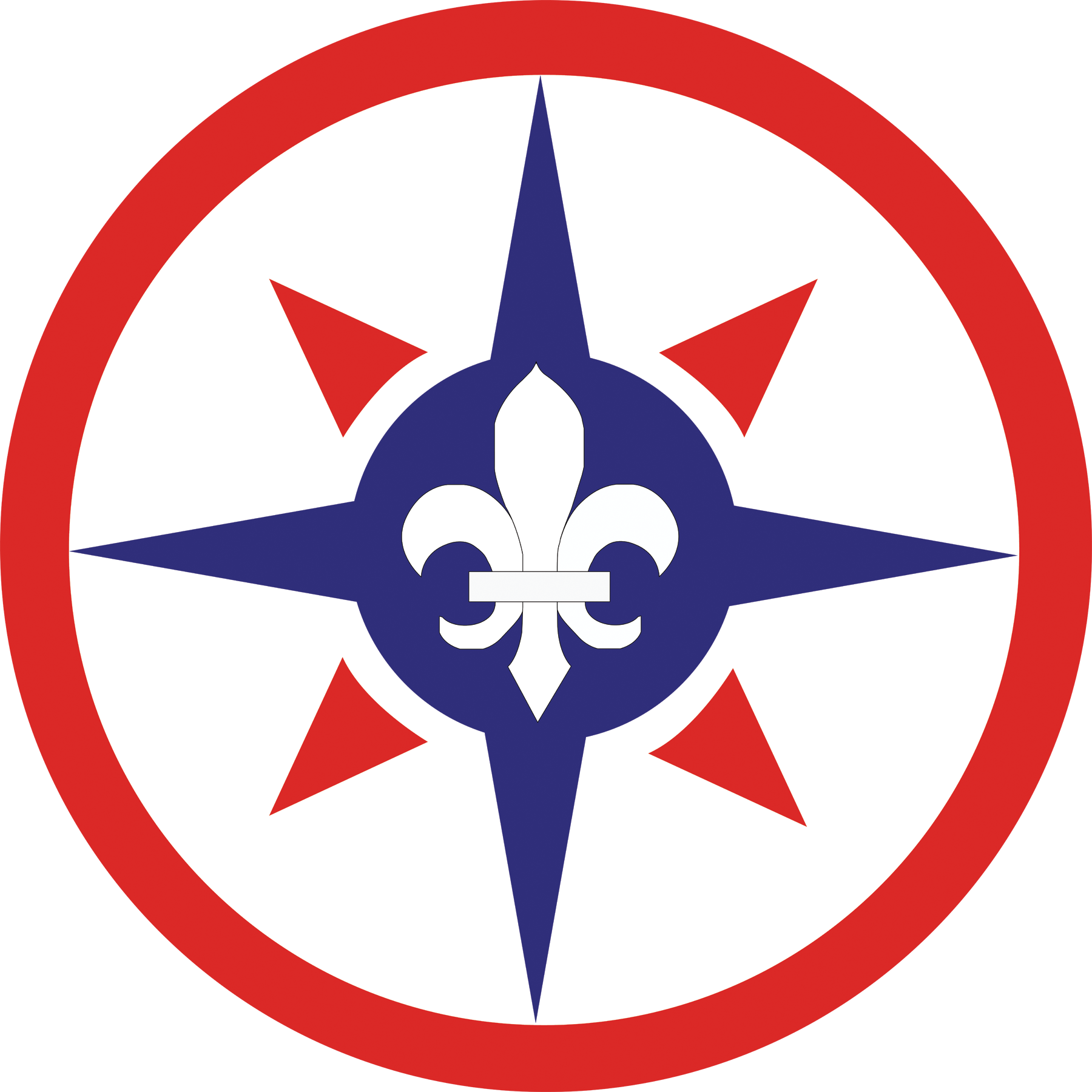
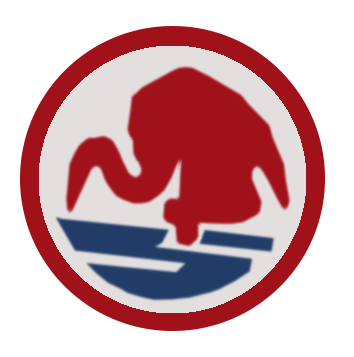
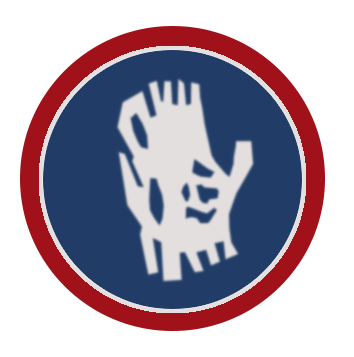
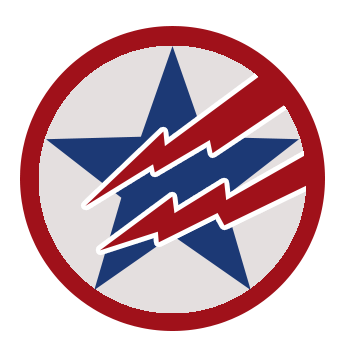
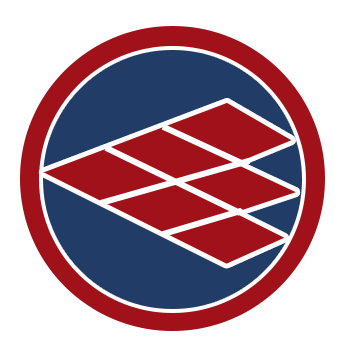
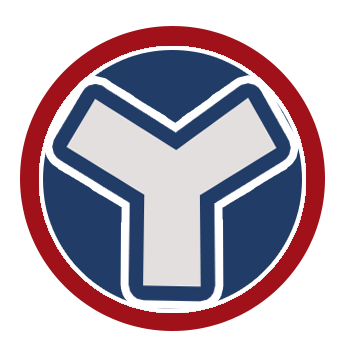
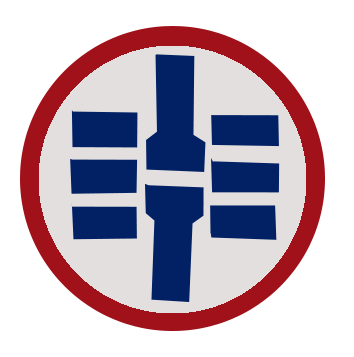
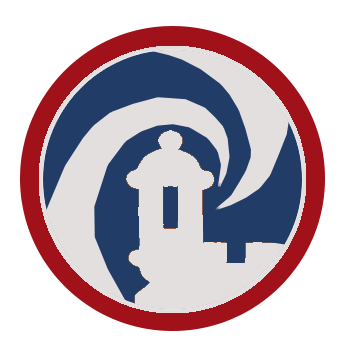
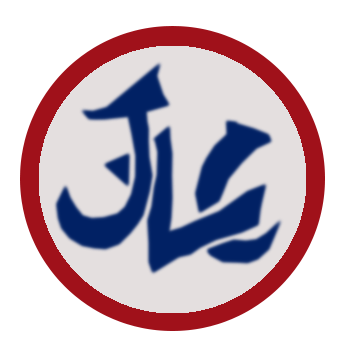
UNIT SSI
	1st Logistical Command - Activated as a planning headquarters in October 1950 at Fort McPherson, Georgia. In 1961, the unit deployed to France. On August 11, 1962, the 1st Logistical Command returned to the United States where it was reassigned to III Corps at Fort Hood, Texas. In 1964, elements of the command were sent to assist MACV and on April 1, 1965, the unit deployed to Vietnam to serve as the logistics command headquarters for all units in the conflict. On 22 June 1972, the command was re-designated the 1st Corps Support Command (COSCOM) and reassigned to the XVIII Airborne Corps, Fort Bragg, North Carolina. On April 16, 2006, COSCOM was re-designated as the 1st Sustainment Command (Theater) and reassigned to Third Army, U.S. Army Central Command.
	2nd Logistical Command - The Pusan Logistical Command was reorganized into the 2nd Logistical Command in September 1950 in Korea under Eighth Army. After the Korean war ended, the command moved to Naha Okinawa to support operations in Vietnam, Thailand and southeast Asia until 1969.
	3rd Logistical Command - was activated in Japan on 19 September 1950 for service in Korea and arrived just 11 days after Gen. MacArthur's invasion and was assigned to X Corps. The command received two Republic of Korea Presidential Unit Citations for its service in Korea before being inactivated on March 20, 1953,. The command was reactivated on June 15, 1958, in France and supported the U.S. Army Europe Communications Zone. In the spring of 1967, the unit left France and moved to Worms, Germany. On June 2, 1969, the command was again inactivated. Its lineage lives on in the 3rd Sustainment Command today.
	4th Logistical Command - Activated 10 February 1952 at Leghorn, Italy and served the US Forces in Austria until its inactivation on 20 January 1954. It was reactivated 15 June 1958 in France under the Advance Section of the Communications Zone (ADSEC). On 23 February 1960, it was renamed the Theater Army Support Command. It was inactivated on 23 June 1967 at Fort Lee, Virginia. From 2008, its lineage lives on in the 4th Sustainment Command.
	5th Logistical Command - originated as the Base Section, European Communications Zone, established at La Rochelle, France, on July 15, 1951. Base Section, COMZ, was redesignated the 5th Logistical Command on June 15, 1958, and was inactivated on March 1, 1960. The unit would become the 5th Support Command in 1962.
	7th Logistical Command - (1959–1964) Japan and Korea formed from KCOMZ support elements. After its deactivation in 1964, it was reformed as the Seventh Army Support Command (1965–1969) in Worms, West Germany.
	8th Logistical Command - In 1960, the USASETAF Logistical Command was redesignated as the 8th Logistical Command supporting units in the Austrian Occupation zone until 1962.
	9th Logistical Command - activated 16 May 1960 on Okinawa and sent to Thailand in 1962. On 12 June 1970, 9th Logistical Command (B) was inactivated at Camp Samae San, Sattahip.
	300th Logistical Command - (1954–1960)
	301st Logistical Command - Activated on 21 March 1952. It was redesignated the 301st Support Brigade in September 1968 and is currently the 301st Regional Support Group (USAR) in Butler, Penn.
	304th Logistical Command - (1955–1960)
	305th Logistical Command - (1954–1956) California USAR
	306th Logistical Command - (1951–1956) Wisconsin National Guard
	307th Logistical Command - (1953–1956) Ohio National Guard
	310th Logistical Command - Activated 29 August 1950 at Fort Myer, Virginia. The unit was redesignated the 310th Field Army Support Command on 4 September 1974. The lineage lives on in the 310th Sustainment Command today.
	311th Logistical Command - Activated 20 March 1955. Redesignated the 311th Support Brigade 2 October 1974. The lineage lives on today as the 311th Sustainment Command.
	312th Logistical Command - (1952–1960)
	313th Logistical Command - (1953–1960) Washington USAR
	314th Logistical Command - (1956–1957)
	315th Logistical Command - (1954–1960)
	316th Logistical Command - was activated on 17 November 1950 in the Organized Reserve and at Knoxville, Tenn. and was deactivated in 1968. On 17 January 2006, the command was reactivated as the 316th Sustainment Command (USAR).
	318th Logistical Command - (1956–1957)
	319th Logistical Command - (1955)
	320th Logistical Command - (1955–1956)
	321st Logistical Command - was activated as the 321st Logistical Command Fort Wayne, Indiana, on 27 February 1951 as an Army Reserve unit, and inactivated on 31 December 1955. In October 1981, the unit was reactivated as the 321st Materiel Management Center (Provisional). Today the unit lineage lives on as the 321st Sustainment Brigade (USAR).
	322nd Logistical Command - (1952–1960) Illinois (USAR)
	323rd Logistical Command - (1960)
	324th Logistical Command - In the 1950s, the 324th Logistical Command was activated as the Headquarters for the reserve forces in Puerto Rico. In December 1965, the 324th Logistical Command was inactivated at Fort Buchanan.
	Japan Logistical Command - The Japan Logistical Command was a major logistics organization of the United States Armed Forces during the post-World War II occupation of Japan. It was established August 25, 1950 and its tasks included logistics and administration support to the UN Forces in the Korean Peninsula and to the combat troops and port units stationed in Japan, as well as cooperation with the Far East Naval / Air Forces and the GHQ. The command was eventually disbanded in 1973 as part of a broader reorganization of U.S. military forces in the Pacific.

== See also ==
- Pentomic Military Organization
- Regimental Combat Team
