= Pentomic =

Military structure

Pentomic (cf. Greek pent(e)- + -tome "of five parts") was a structure for infantry and airborne divisions adopted by the US Army between 1957 and 1963 in response to the potential use of tactical nuclear weapons on future battlefields. It was intended that the five subordinate units, which were often referred to as battle groups (to distinguish them from traditional units), would be able to deploy and engage in operations more rapidly than conventional brigades while also having greater offensive capabilities than conventional battalions.

One US Army publication defines the pentomic division as "a public relations term designed to combine the concept of five subordinate units ('penta') with the idea of a division that could function on [either] an atomic or nonatomic battlefield".

Several other countries also temporarily adopted similar structures in their armed forces, at around the same time as the US example, including France (from 1955), Australia, Turkey, and Spain.

== History ==
=== Nuclear battlefields ===
The addition of mechanization to army forces led to rapid changes in doctrine. During World War I the defensive firepower of infantry forces and especially their associated artillery made manoeuvrability almost impossible without overwhelming numbers. Any breakthrough could be countered by reserve forces that moved at the same speed as the attacking forces.

With the introduction of the first tanks, much smaller forces could effect a breakthrough, and move much more rapidly than the defending infantry. Ideally, this would force the defenders to retreat to new lines in order to maintain a front line. By the start of World War II, this basic concept had developed into the idea of a "spearhead", a dense formation of highly mobile forces that would concentrate at a single point, overwhelm the local opposition, and then run into the lightly defended rear areas. This became known as Blitzkrieg after its initial successful employment by the German forces.

Nuclear weapons dramatically upset this concept. In a nuclear battlefield, the concentration of forces into a spearhead would present a perfect target for the employment of tactical nuclear weapons. A single well-placed weapon could break up the attacking forces before they even had time to properly prepare, causing enough casualties to make them ineffective even in the defense. In the battles foreseen by planners in the 1950s, traditional infantry and armored units appeared to be extremely vulnerable.

It was this weakness that led first to the New Look of 1953, and then to the "New" New Look of 1955. The latter, especially, aimed to counter any Warsaw Pact action in Europe with the use of nuclear weapons on the battlefield, allowing NATO's superior airpower to destroy the Warsaw Pact's massed armor. As part of this shift in policy, the majority of US military development and funding was sent to the US Air Force and US Navy; the Army was, to a degree, ignored. It was this prioritization of nuclear deterrence over conventional forces that reduced the U.S. Army's relative strategic standing, leading some Army officers to express concern over the service's role within national defense policy and if President Dwight Eisenhower had decided that the Army was “merely desirable.”

=== Implementation ===
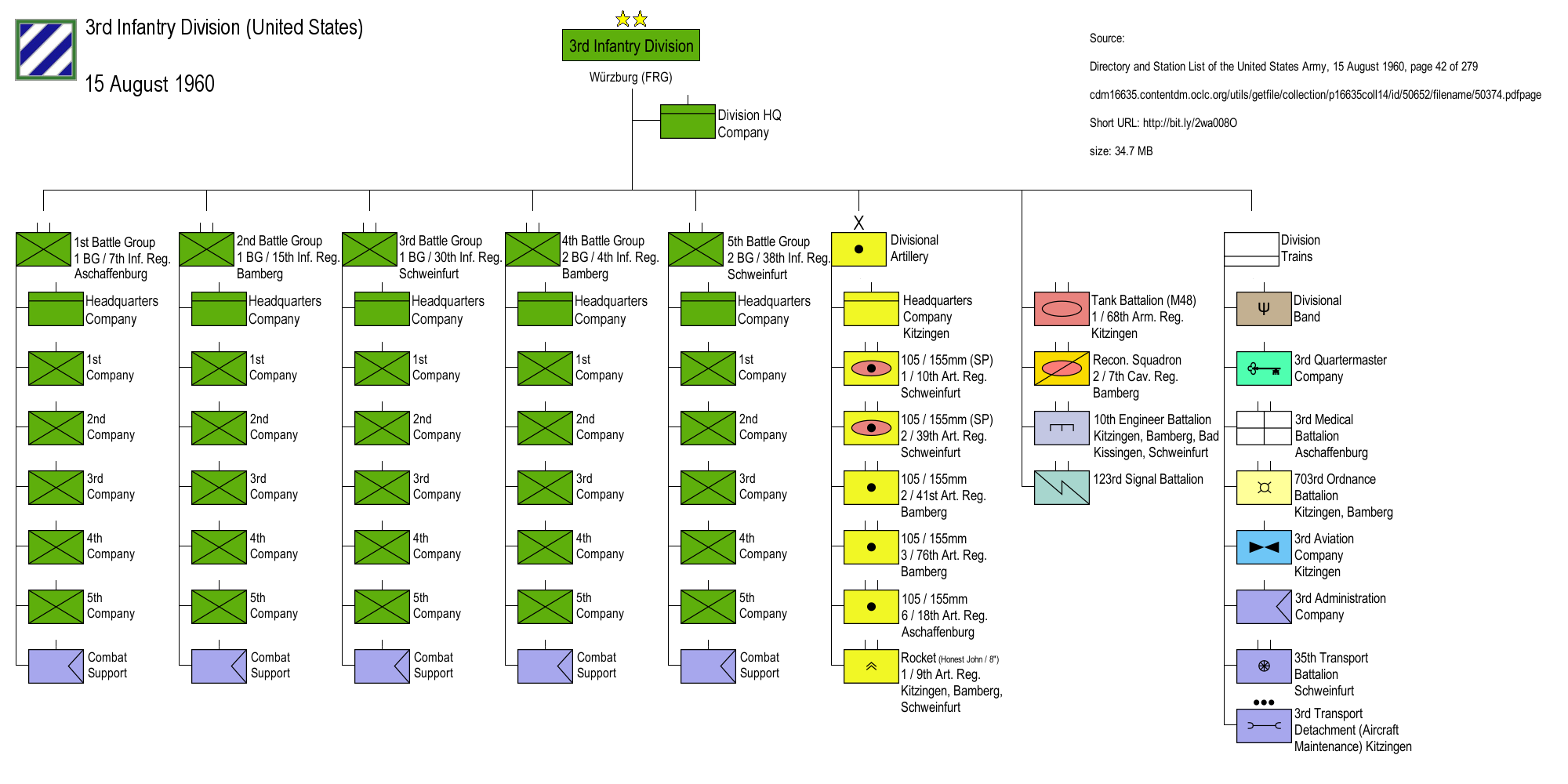
US 3rd Infantry Division, Pentomic Structure, August 1960. Each of the five Infantry "Battle Groups" on the left contain five infantry companies. The five groups of five define the Pentomic structure.

In July 1955, General Maxwell D. Taylor became the Chief of Staff of the United States Army and selected General William Westmoreland as his Secretary to the General Staff. Westmoreland recalled that Taylor was told by President Dwight Eisenhower that he had to do something to give the Army "charisma"; something in Westmoreland's words to give the Army a "modern look".

Taylor designed the Pentomic concept with the basic concept being to reduce the time needed to organize an attack, thereby reducing the time available for the enemy to respond with a nuclear strike. To do this, the Pentomic concept organized what would normally be parts of several different units into a more balanced division, reducing the need for communications between different command structures that would introduce delays.

After Taylor designed the Pentomic concept, he promoted Westmoreland to become what was then the youngest major general in the US Army to command Taylor's former wartime command, the recently reactivated 101st Airborne Division. This would be the first unit to be reconfigured in the Pentomic structure.

American army officers felt the plan was "ill started, ill fated and hopefully short lived" with some thinking it was a scheme of Taylor's to increase the number of active divisions in the Army when he had actually cut their combat manpower.

Westmoreland recalled that the pentomic structure, with all its flaws, was a creature of the Chief of Staff, and any officer who valued his career was loath to criticise it. Westmoreland also briefed all officers in the division that "Our job is not to determine whether it will work—our job is to make it work". Following the end of Westmoreland's command of the 101st in 1960 he recommended that the pentomic structure be abolished.

=== Lineages ===
Under the pentomic reorganization, the traditional regimental organization employed by the Army was to be eliminated. This raised questions as to what the new units were to be called, how they were to be numbered, and what their relationship to former organizations was to be. Many of the Army's senior officers were determined to perpetuate the historic lineages of the Army, unlike the situation after the Civil War when the Grand Army of the Republic persuaded Congress to forbid the linkage between the Civil War era Union Army corps and the new corps organized for the Spanish–American War.

On 24 January 1957, the Secretary of the Army approved the U.S. Army Combat Arms Regimental System (CARS) concept, as devised by the Deputy Chief of Staff for Personnel, which was designed to provide a flexible regimental structure that would permit perpetuation of unit history and tradition in the new tactical organization of divisions, without restricting the organizational trends of the future.

Separate brigades were also organized with two or three battle groups. The 2nd Infantry Brigade was organized as follows:

- Headquarters & Headquarters Company
- 1st Battle Group, 4th Infantry
- 2nd Battle Group, 60th Infantry
- 3rd Battalion, 4th Artillery
- 1st Battalion, 76th Artillery
- Troop F, 5th Cavalry
- Company F, 34th Armor
- Company G, 34th Armor
- Brigade Trains
- 232nd Engineer Company (Combat)
- 712th Engineer Company (Combat)

=== End of Reorganization of the Current Infantry Division (ROCID) ===
In December 1960, the Army began studying proposals to reorganize again that was hastened by newly elected President John F. Kennedy's "Doctrine of Flexible Response". This led to the Reorganization Objective Army Division (ROAD) initiative by 1963.

== Organization ==
The infantry and airborne division structures commonly known as pentomic divisions are actually two related organizations, officially known as Reorganization of The Airborne Division (ROTAD) and Reorganization of the Current Infantry Division (ROCID). The pentomic structure was a reaction to the perceived threat of nuclear weapons on the modern battlefield and a chance for the Army to secure additional funding.

Earlier, the US Army had fought World War I with the "square" organisation, each division having two brigades, each with two infantry regiments. Prior to American participation in World War II, the organization was changed to "triangular" with each division directly controlling three regiments and eliminating the brigade echelon from the division.

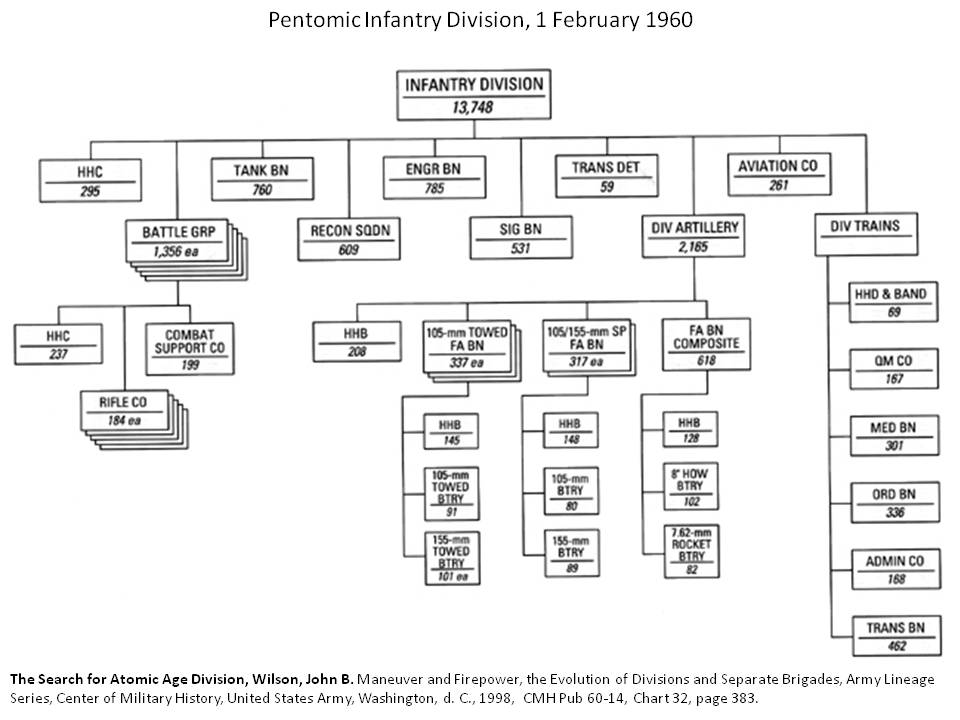
1960 Pentomic Infantry Division. The five "Battle Groups" on the left of the diagram dominate the Divisional structure.

The ROTAD was implemented first, with the 101st Airborne Division reorganizing under test tables of organization published on 10 August 1956. The core of the division was five infantry battle groups, each containing five infantry companies, a headquarters and service company, and a mortar battery. A headquarters and headquarters battalion contained a headquarters and service company, an administration company, an aviation company and a reconnaissance troop. The division artillery contained a headquarters and headquarters battery, five 105 mm howitzer firing batteries, and an Honest John missile battery. A support group contained a headquarters and service company, a maintenance battalion, a quartermaster parachute company, a supply and transportation company and a medical company. Separate signal and engineer battalions completed the organization, which required a total of 11,486 men. After a series of tests by the 101st Airborne Division, the Continental Army Command (CONARC) approved slightly modified tables of organization, and all three airborne divisions (the 11th, 82nd and 101st) were reorganized during 1957.

Shortly after the 101st began testing ROTAD, the CONARC began developing ROCID, forwarding the initial ROCID tables of organization to the Army Staff on 15 October 1956. The core of this initial ROCID organization, similar to ROTAD, consisted of five battle groups, each with a headquarters and service company, a mortar battery and four infantry rifle companies. The Division Artillery was organized with a 105mm howitzer battalion, with five firing batteries, and a composite battalion with four firing batteries: two 155 mm howitzer batteries, an 8 inch howitzer battery and an Honest John missile battery. In addition to a headquarters and headquarters company, a tank battalion, reconnaissance squadron, engineer battalion, signal battalion and division trains completed the division's organization. The division trains consisted of a headquarters and headquarters detachment (which included the division's band), an ordnance maintenance battalion, a medical battalion, a transportation battalion, a quartermaster company, an aviation company and an administrative company. The Army's nine infantry divisions completed reorganization into the new structure in 1957.

The standard infantry division was seen as being too clumsy in its fixed organization. Units were organized in a system of "5s". A division was organized with five battle groups, each commanded by a colonel. Each battle group consisted of five line (rifle) companies, a mortar (4.2 in) battery, and a headquarters company with signal, assault gun and recon platoons. Each company was commanded by a captain. The Division Artillery was initially organized with a 105 mm howitzer battalion, with five batteries, and a composite battalion with four firing batteries: two 155mm howitzer batteries, an 8-inch howitzer battery and an Honest John missile battery. Later, the Division Artillery was re-organized into five direct support battalions (each with one 105mm firing battery and one 155mm firing battery), and a general support battalion (with the 8 inch firing battery and the Honest John battery). Two of the direct support battalions were equipped with self-propelled howitzers, and three were equipped with towed howitzers. In order to man the increased number of batteries, the 4.2 inch mortar batteries in each battle group were removed. The 1961 addition of "Davy Crockett" recoilless spigot guns with atomic warheads supplemented the concept of the atomic age army. Figure 2, "The Pentomic Division", on page 107 of Bacevich's book The Pentomic Era shows a graphic from the Annual Report of the Secretary of Defense for Fiscal Year 1956 depicting the initial ROCID organization. The graphic shows "5 Combat Groups of 5 Companies Each"; 5 105mm Mortar Batteries; an Honest John Rocket Battery; 5 105mm Howitzer Batteries; and, 5 HQ & Service Companies, with each including "Reconnaissance, Signal, Supply, & Medical".

The pentomic division very closely resembled the wartime 82nd and 101st Airborne Divisions which had each fought with five parachute or glider infantry regiments. Their regiments were smaller and more austere than the regular infantry regiments of the infantry divisions. This was no accident as the top leaders of the army at this time were all airborne commanders - Matthew Ridgway, Maxwell D. Taylor and James M. Gavin. The armored divisions were not affected as their three combat commands were considered appropriate for the nuclear battlefield.

== Flaws ==
The pentomic systems were found to be flawed in several ways.

- Training: Officers would not command for long periods of time between assignments to maneuver units (as a captain at the company level and as a colonel at the battle group level). This would erode the experience and competence of Battle Group commanders once the experienced officers of World War II and Korea retired.
- Span of control: Most people are capable of managing 2–5 separate elements. The pentomic battle group contained seven companies and in combat would habitually have 2–4 more attached such as engineers, artillery or armor.
- Loss of regimental cohesion: Traditional infantry regiments had long histories and commanded strong loyalty from their assigned soldiers. The Battle Groups, and later, the ROAD brigades, combined infantry battalions from different regiments in a chaotic fashion that eliminated regimental cohesion.
- Loss of a level of command: Previously there had been company commanders (captain), battalion commanders (major or lieutenant colonel), and regimental commanders (colonel); the pentomic structure eliminated the level of battalion commander.

== Other nations ==
Even before the adoption of the pentomic organization by the US Army, the French Army adopted a very similar organization in 1955, called Javelot (Javelin), although with some differences. While in the pentomic structure, the maneuver units of the divisions were called battle groups, in the javelot model they were called regiments. Also, each javelot type regimental headquarters was able to establish two small subordinate tactical headquarters to control groups of companies which formed a kind of provisional battalion, which was not foreseen in the pentomic battle groups. These features prevented some of the flaws of the pentomic structure, including the issues related to span of control, loss of the level of command between company and regiment, and loss of regimental cohesion caused by the removal of the traditional regiments from the tactical organization. Because of the lack of the flaws associated with the pentomic organization and the successful employment of javelot type units in the Suez Crisis and in the Algerian War, this model of organization was kept and is still the basis of the French Army organization today.

The Australian Army implemented a similar structure, called the pentropic organisation, between 1960 and 1965 but reverted to its previous structure after experiencing difficulties similar to those experienced by the US Army.

The New Zealand Army planned to reorganize its forces around a derivative of the Australian concept, but the Australians abandoned the concept before the New Zealanders could start the change.

The Turkish Army utilised the pentomic structure in 1960s for a period before adopting the American ROAD divisional organisation.

The West German Army attempted reorganization around the pentomic structure in 1957, abandoning the idea within a few years.

After the signature of the Pact of Madrid with the United States, the Spanish Army abandoned the organization inherited from the Spanish Civil War to adopt the pentomic structure. Three experimental pentomic infantry divisions were created in 1958, followed by five additional ones in 1960. The pentomic structure was abandoned in 1965, when the Spanish Army adopted the French doctrine and organization of the era.

== See also ==
- Combat command
- Regimental combat team
- US Army Logistical Commands
- Transformation of the United States Army
- US Army Missile Commands
