= 3rd Transportation Brigade (Expeditionary) =

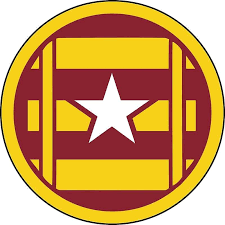
- Active: 27 June 2015 - present
- Country: United States
- Branch: United States Army Reserve
- Part of: 316th Expeditionary Sustainment Command
- Garrison/HQ: Fort Belvoir, VA
- Motto: Every Move A Success
- Equipment: 128’ Large Tug (LT) Small Tug (ST) 174’ Landing Craft, Utility (LCU) 314’ Logistics Support Vessel (LSV)
- Website: https://www.usar.army.mil/377thTSC/3rdTBX/

Commanders
- Current commander: Col. Christopher "Bryan" Riley
- Command Sergeant Major: CSM Gilbert Garrett

Insignia
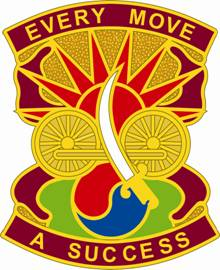
- 3rd Transportation Brigade DUI

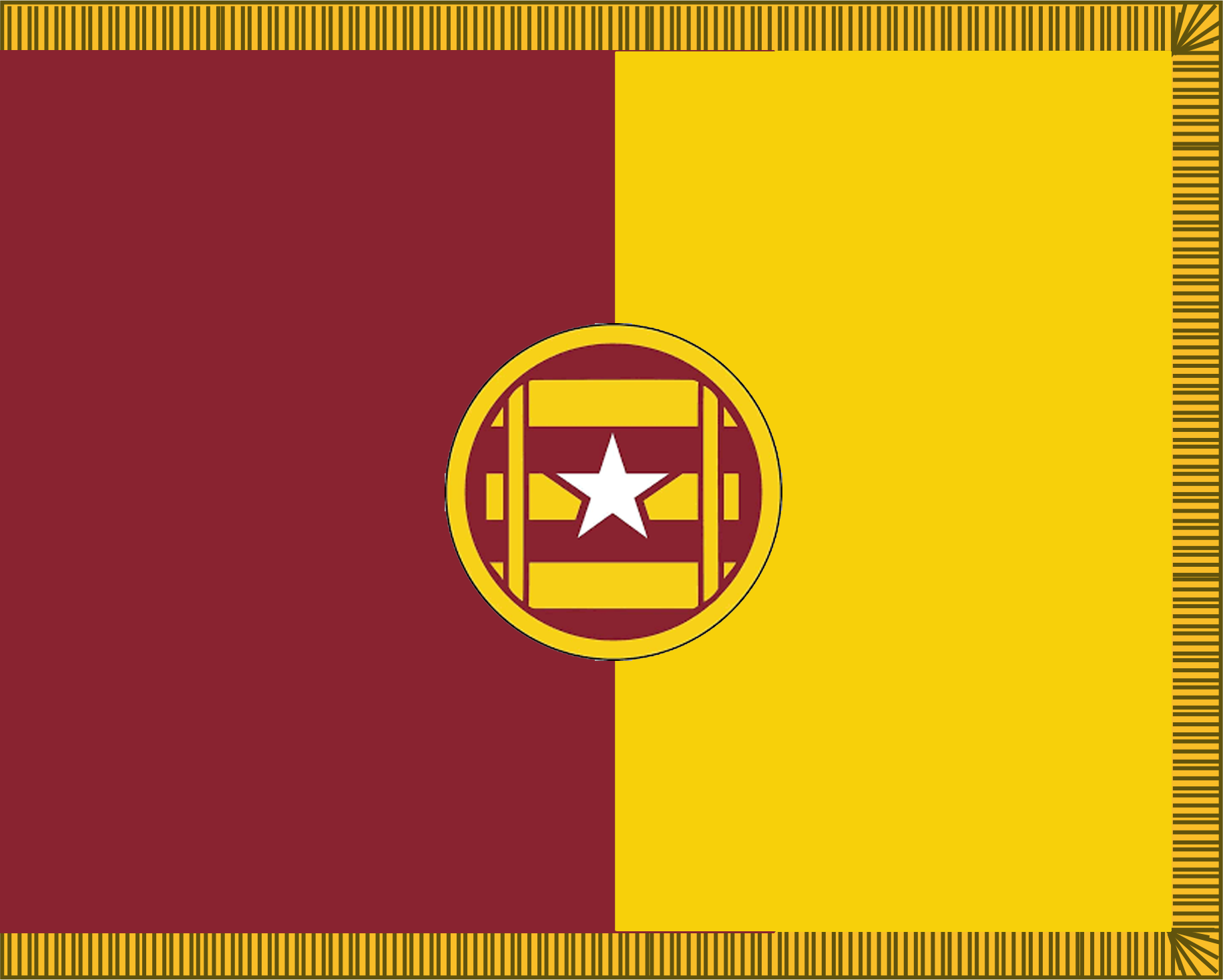
- 3rd Transportation Brigade Flag

The 3rd Transportation Brigade (Expeditionary) was activated on June 27, 2015 at Fort Belvoir, Virginia becoming the first watercraft brigade in the Army Reserve.

The brigade carries on the lineage of the 22nd Railway Grand Division, as it was first known in 1941. It was re-designated the 3rd Transportation Command in 1969 and subsequently as the 3rd Transportation Brigade in 1972. It further went through another name change in 1994 to the 3rd Transportation Agency.

Their current mission is to use watercraft to manage seaports and waterways and to provide help to local authorities and Homeland Security during disasters.

In 2025, the USAR changed the mission to joint logistics over-the-shore (JLOTS) maritime support. The 3rd TB(X) has been focusing on port opening and watercraft training as a part of this mission.

== Organization ==
The brigade is a subordinate unit of the 316th Expeditionary Sustainment Command. As of January 2026 the group consists of the following units:

- 3rd Transportation Brigade (Expeditionary), at Fort Belvoir (VA)
  - Headquarters and Headquarters Company, 3rd Transportation Brigade (Expeditionary), at Fort Belvoir (VA)
  - 359th Transportation Battalion (Terminal), at Joint Base Langley–Eustis (VA)
    - Headquarters and Headquarters Detachment, 359th Transportation Battalion (Terminal), at Joint Base Langley–Eustis (VA)
    - 302nd Transportation Company (Inland Cargo Transfer Company — ICTC), at Joint Base Langley–Eustis (VA)
    - 466th Transportation Company (Seaport Operations), at Joint Base Langley–Eustis (VA)

== Insignia ==
Shoulder Sleeve Insignia is a 2-inch (5.08 cm) brick red disc featuring a golden yellow railway track segment with two vertical rails supported by three horizontal crossties. The central crosstie is topped with a white star, all enclosed by a 1/8 inch (.32 cm) golden yellow border.

The shoulder sleeve insignia was approved for the 3d Transportation Command on 23 October 1969.

Distinctive Unit Insignia is a gold metal and enamel device measuring 1 3/16 inches (3.02 cm) in height features a scarlet rising sun with eight rays. At the base, on a green field, is a scarlet and blue Korean Taeguk. In the center, two gold locomotive wheels and a white scimitar blade . The brick red scrolls are inscribed "EVERY MOVE A SUCCESS" in gold.

The distinctive unit insignia was originally approved for the 3d Transportation Brigade on 17 January 1973.
