= 301st Regional Support Group =

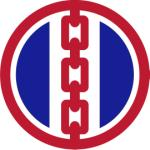
- Active: 1952-present
- Country: United States
- Branch: United States Army Reserve
- Role: Support
- Size: Group (Brigade)
- Part of: 316th Expeditionary Sustainment Command
- Garrison/HQ: Butler, Pennsylvania
- Motto: The Unbroken Chain
- Decorations: Meritorious Unit Commendation
- Website: https://www.facebook.com/301stRSG

Commanders
- Current commander: COL. Adam Rosenbaum
- Command Sergeant Major: CSM Shanon Houser

Insignia
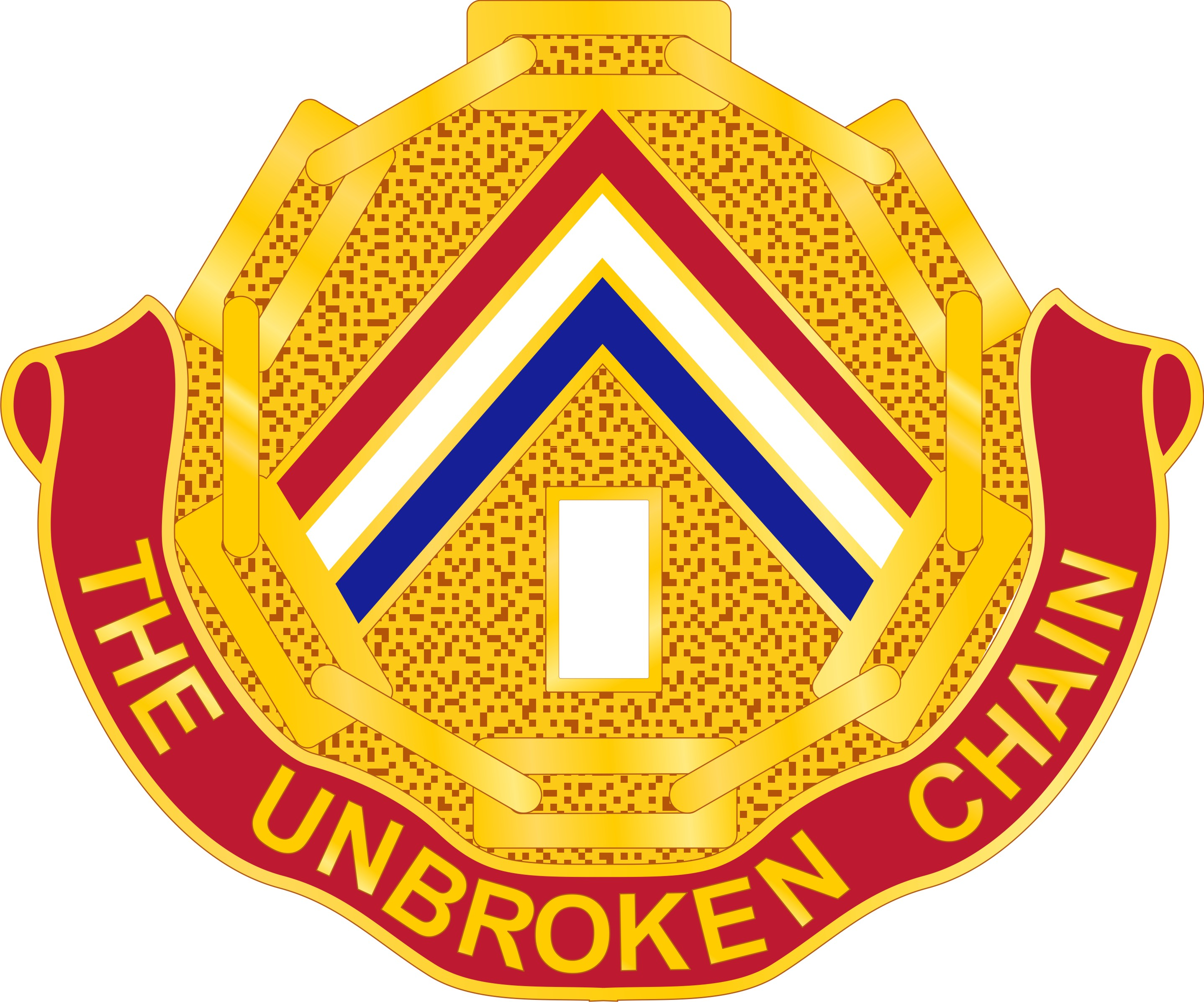
- 301st Regional Support Group DUI

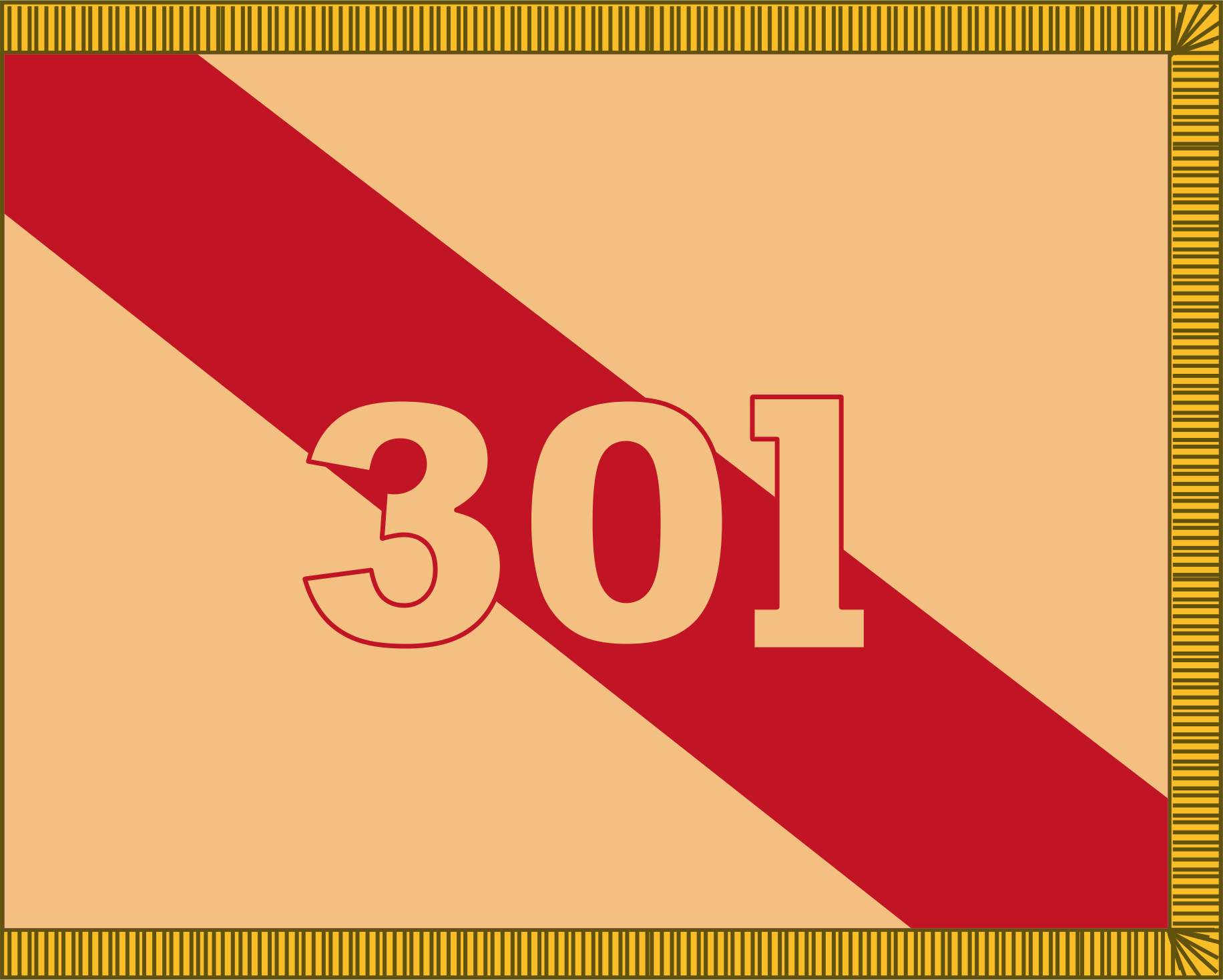
- 301st Regional Support Group Flag

The 301st Regional Support Group is a unit of the US Army Reserve. The unit began as the 301st Logistical Command in 1952. It was redesignated as the 301st Support Brigade in 1968 and deactivated in 1972. The unit was reactivated in 1999 as the 301st Support Group. Some time after 2001 if was renamed an Area Support Group and prior to 2016 it became a Regional Support Group.

== Organization ==
The group is a subordinate unit of the 316th Expeditionary Sustainment Command. As of January 2026 the group consists of the following units:

- 301st Regional Support Group, in Butler (PA)
  - Headquarters and Headquarters Company, 301st Regional Support Group, in Butler (PA)
  - 542nd Quartermaster Company (Force Provider), in Fairview (PA)
  - 157th Combat Sustainment Support Battalion, at Biddle Air National Guard Base (PA)
    - Headquarters and Headquarters Company, 157th Combat Sustainment Support Battalion, at Biddle Air National Guard Base (PA)
    - 223rd Transportation Medium Truck Company (POL, 7.5K GAL) (EAB Linehaul), in Newtown Square (PA)
    - 233rd Quartermaster Company (Petroleum Support), at Biddle Air National Guard Base (PA)
    - 465th Transportation Medium Truck Company (POL, 5K GAL) (EAB Linehaul), in Bristol (PA)
    - 492nd Human Resources Company (Postal), in Bristol (PA)
      - 1st Platoon, 492nd Human Resources Company (Postal), in Millwood (WV)
      - 2nd Platoon, 492nd Human Resources Company (Postal), in Richmond (VA)
    - 978th Quartermaster Company (Supply), in Newtown Square (PA)
      - Detachment 1, 978th Quartermaster Company (Supply), in Upper Marlboro (MD)
      - Detachment 2, 978th Quartermaster Company (Supply), in Richmond (VA)
  - 378th Combat Sustainment Support Battalion, at Fort Indiantown Gap (PA)
    - Headquarters and Headquarters Company, 378th Combat Sustainment Support Battalion, at Fort Indiantown Gap (PA)
    - 298th Ordnance Company (Support Maintenance), in Johnstown (PA)
      - Detachment 1, 298th Ordnance Company (Support Maintenance), in Clearfield (PA)
    - 442nd Quartermaster Company (Field Service) (Modular), in Bellefonte (PA)
      - Detachment 1, 442nd Quartermaster Company (Field Service) (Modular), in Williamsport (PA)
    - 733rd Transportation Medium Truck Company (PLS) (EAB Tactical), in Reading (PA)
  - 413th Combat Sustainment Support Battalion, in Schenectady (NY)
    - Headquarters and Headquarters Company, 413th Combat Sustainment Support Battalion, in Schenectady (NY)
    - 490th Quartermaster Company (Supply), in Rochester (NY)
    - 618th Quartermaster Detachment (Petroleum Liaison Team), in Schenectady (NY)
    - 698th Quartermaster Company (Supply), in Nichols (NY)
    - 962nd Ordnance Company (Ammo) (Modular), in Plattsburgh (NY)
      - 1st Platoon, 962nd Ordnance Company (Ammo) (Modular), in Schenectady (NY)
    - 1018th Quartermaster Company (Petroleum Pipeline and Terminal Operation), in Schenectady (NY)
      - Detachment 1, 1018th Quartermaster Company (Petroleum Pipeline and Terminal Operation), in Mattydale (NY)

Abbreviations: PLS — Palletized Load System; POL — Petroleum Oil Lubricants; EAB — Echelon Above Brigade
