= US Army Missile Commands =

The US Army Missile Commands were units in the CONUS as well as Europe and Asia that could project all weather tactical atomic weapons during the Pentomic Army from 1957 to 1978.

The 1st and 2nd US Army Missile Commands were organized as medium missile commands with MGR-1 Honest John missile battalions and MGM-5 Corporal missile battalions. Each was designed with a headquarters and headquarters company, a field artillery rocket group and up to 4 Honest John battalions, a Corporal battalion, an engineer combat battalion, an armored infantry battalion, an air cavalry squadron, a signal company and a service and supply group. Neither were ever organized exactly like that. The 1st was stationed first at Leghorn and later Vicenza Italy with SETAF from 1957 to 1965. The 2nd was active from 1957 to 1961, first at Ft. Hood, Texas and then Ft. Carson, Colorado.

The 3rd and 4th US Army Missile Commands were organized as air transportable units built around an Honest John battalion to support divisions with rocket and atomic firepower. The tables of organization and equipment authorized the command a headquarters and headquarters company, an Honest John battalion, a signal company, an infantry rifle company for local security, an engineer combat company and a support company. The 3rd served at Ft. Bragg, North Carolina from 1957 to 1963. The 4th US Missile command served at Camp Page, South Korea supporting the First ROK Army and the Eighth US Army from 1958 to 1978.

Unit SSI	Command	Location	Dates
	1st Missile Command	Vicenza, Italy	1957–1965
	2nd Missile Command	Fort Hood, Texas	1957–1961
	3rd Missile Command	Fort Bragg, NC	1957–1963
	4th Missile Command	Camp Page, South Korea	1958–1978
