= 316th Expeditionary Sustainment Command =

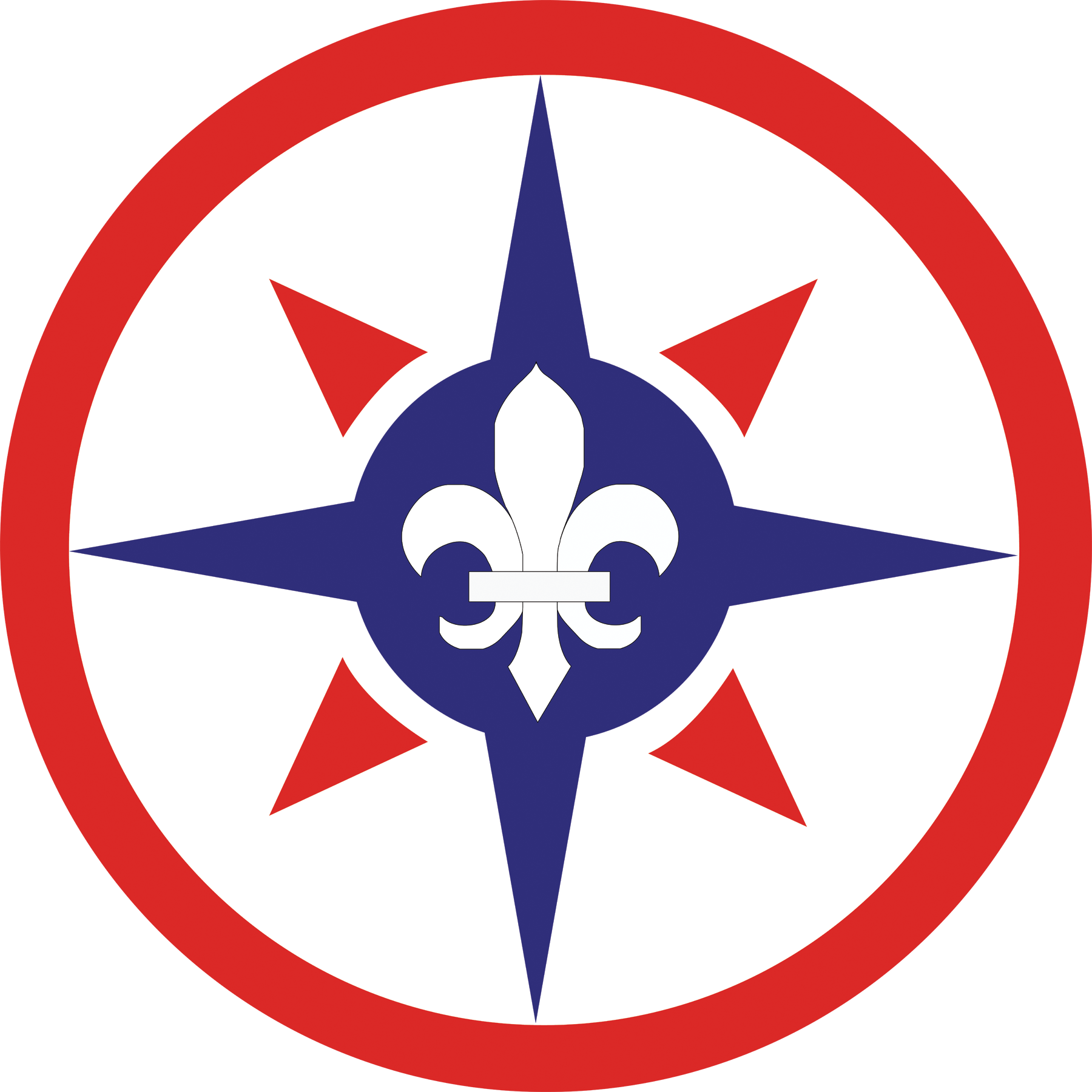
- Shoulder Sleeve Insignia
- Active: 1950-1968; 2006 - present
- Country: United States
- Branch: United States Army Reserve
- Role: Expeditionary Sustainment Command
- Part of: 377th Theater Sustainment Command
- Reserve Center: Coraopolis, Pa.
- Motto: Sustain the Victory!
- Engagements: Operation Iraqi Freedom 2008 Operation Enduring Freedom/Operation Inherent Resolve 2016-2017

Commanders
- Current commander: BG Roderick Laughman
- Command Sergeant Major: CSM Darrin Campbell

Insignia
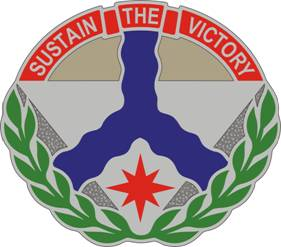
- 316th Sustainment Command DUI

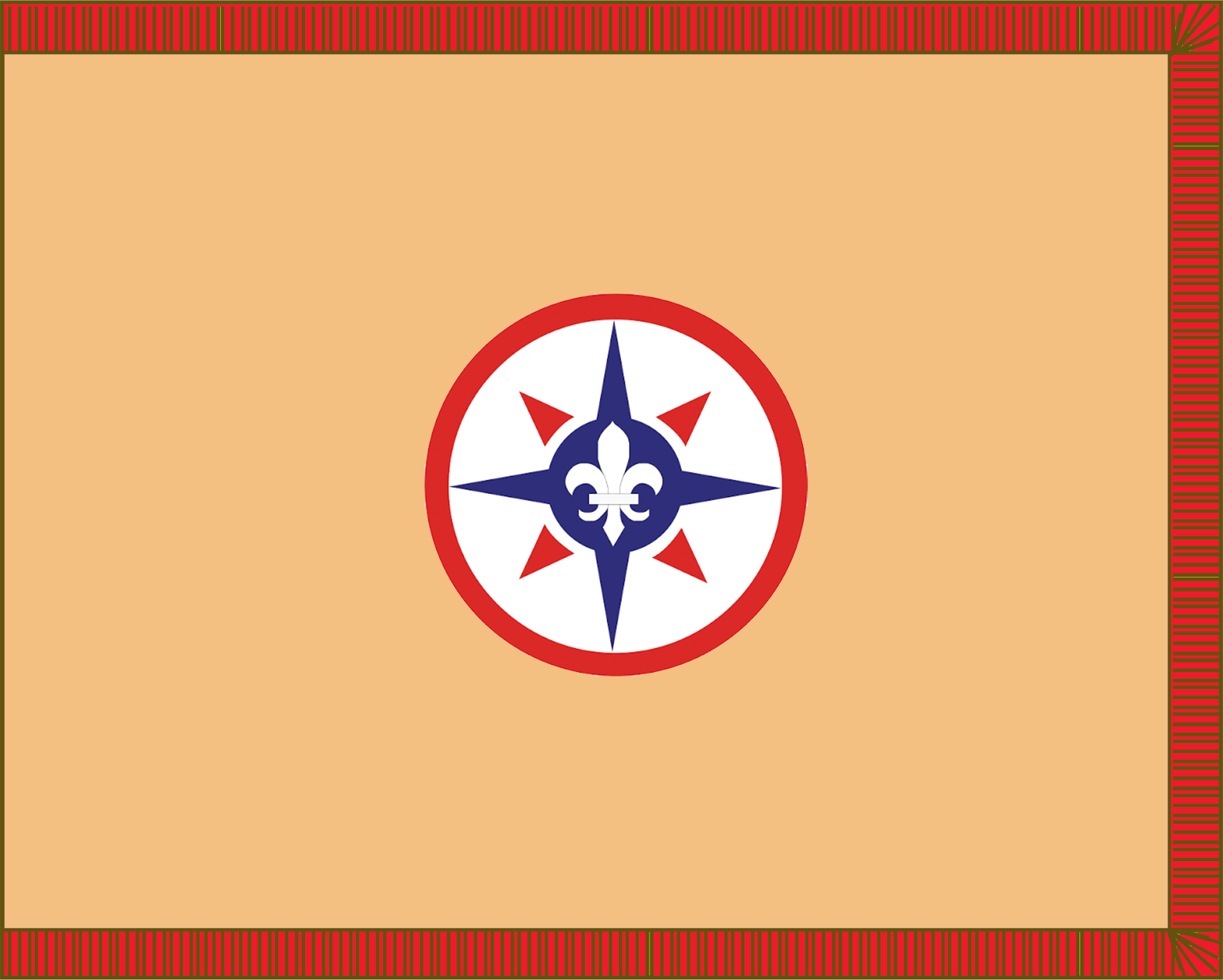
- 316th Sustainment Command Flag

The 316th Expeditionary Sustainment Command (316 ESC) is one of six general officer sustainment commands in the Army Reserve. It has command and control of more than 10,000 Army Reserve Soldiers throughout the northeastern United States.

The ESC is a peacetime subordinate to the 377th Theater Sustainment Command.

== History ==
The original 316th Logistical Command was constituted on 17 November 1950 in the Organized Reserve Corps and activated on 1 December 1950 at Knoxville, Tenn. The 316th Logistical Command was redesignated on 9 July 1952 in the Army Reserve and again on 30 November 1960 as Headquarters Detachment, 316th Logistical Command. The unit was deactivated in 1968 at Knoxville.

On 17 January 2006, the command was redesignated as Headquarters and Headquarters Company, 316th Expeditionary Sustainment Command and was activated on 16 September 2007 at Coraopolis, Pa.

The 316th Sustainment Command is the U.S. Army's first transformation-era modular ESC unit, and the first to deploy to Iraq. The 316th transformed from a traditionally structured force to one designed to better address sustained military operations and missions and the nation's emergency rapid response.

The command's mission is provide command and control of all sustainment forces in an operational theater.

While in Iraq from August 2007 to June 2008, the 316th ESC, composed of more than 20,000 personnel, provided logistical coordination and support to U.S. units (165,000), Multi-National Coalition partners and Iraqi Forces in support of all operations. That support translated into everything from bullets to beans, fuel to maintenance parts and coordinating certain human resource services (liaison teams, personnel replacements, finance).

== Structure ==
The command is a subordinate unit of the 377th Theater Sustainment Command. As of January 2026 the command consists of the following units:

- Headquarters 316th Expeditionary Sustainment Command, in Coraopolis (PA)
  - Headquarters and Headquarters Company, 316th Expeditionary Sustainment Command, in Coraopolis (PA)
  - 3rd Transportation Brigade (Expeditionary), at Fort Belvoir (VA)
    - Headquarters and Headquarters Company, 3rd Transportation Brigade (Expeditionary), at Fort Belvoir (VA)
    - 359th Transportation Battalion (Terminal), at Joint Base Langley–Eustis (VA)
      - Headquarters and Headquarters Detachment, 359th Transportation Battalion (Terminal), at Joint Base Langley–Eustis (VA)
      - 302nd Transportation Company (Inland Cargo Transfer Company — ICTC), at Joint Base Langley–Eustis (VA)
      - 466th Transportation Company (Seaport Operations), at Joint Base Langley–Eustis (VA)
  - 77th Sustainment Brigade, at Joint Base McGuire-Dix-Lakehurst (NJ)
    - 77th Special Troops Battalion, at Joint Base McGuire-Dix-Lakehurst (NJ)
      - Headquarters and Headquarters Company, 77th Sustainment Brigade, at Joint Base McGuire-Dix-Lakehurst (NJ)
      - 404th Brigade Signal Company (MEB/CAB/SB), at Joint Base McGuire–Dix–Lakehurst (NJ)
    - 354th Transportation Battalion (Movement Control), at Fort Totten (NY)
      - Headquarters and Headquarters Detachment, 354th Transportation Battalion (Movement Control), at Fort Totten (NY)
      - 139th Transportation Detachment (Movement Control Team), at Fort Totten (NY)
      - 140th Quartermaster Company (Field Service) (Modular), at Fort Totten (NY)
      - 142nd Transportation Detachment (Movement Control Team), at Fort Totten (NY)
      - 237th Ordnance Company (Support Maintenance), at Fort Totten (NY)
      - 773rd Transportation Medium Truck Company (POL, 5K GAL) (EAB Linehaul), at Fort Totten (NY)
    - 389th Combat Sustainment Support Battalion, at Fort Totten (NY)
      - Headquarters and Headquarters Company, 389th Combat Sustainment Support Battalion, at Fort Totten (NY)
      - 77th Human Resources Company, in Amherst (NY)
      - 316th Adjutant General Detachment (Military Mail Terminal), at Fort Totten (NY)
      - 408th Human Resources Company, at Fort Totten (NY)
        - 3rd Platoon, 408th Human Resources Company, in Shoreham (NY)
        - 5th Platoon, 408th Human Resources Company, in Tonawanda (NY)
      - 1019th Quartermaster Company (Mortuary Affairs), at Fort Wadsworth (NY)
    - 436th Transportation Battalion (Movement Control), at Fort Wadsworth (NY)
      - Headquarters and Headquarters Detachment, 436th Transportation Battalion (Movement Control), at Fort Wadsworth (NY)
      - 716th Quartermaster Company (Petroleum Support), in Jersey City (NJ)
        - 2nd Platoon, 716th Quartermaster Company (Petroleum Support), in Blackwood (NJ)
      - 874th Transportation Detachment (Movement Control Team), at Fort Wadsworth (NY)
      - 961st Transportation Detachment (Movement Control Team), at Fort Wadsworth (NY)
      - 976th Transportation Detachment (Movement Control Team), at Fort Wadsworth (NY)
    - 462nd Transportation Battalion (Movement Control), in Trenton (NJ)
      - Headquarters and Headquarters Detachment, 462nd Transportation Battalion (Movement Control), in Trenton (NJ)
      - 427th Transportation Detachment (Movement Control Team), at Biddle Air National Guard Base (PA)
      - 445th Quartermaster Company (Field Service) (Modular), in Trenton (NJ)
      - 579th Transportation Company (Inland Cargo Transfer Company — ICTC), at Joint Base McGuire–Dix–Lakehurst (NJ)
      - 947th Quartermaster Company (Petroleum Support), at Letterkenny Army Depot (PA)
  - 301st Regional Support Group, in Butler (PA)
    - Headquarters and Headquarters Company, 301st Regional Support Group, in Butler (PA)
    - 542nd Quartermaster Company (Force Provider), in Fairview (PA)
    - 157th Combat Sustainment Support Battalion, at Biddle Air National Guard Base (PA)
      - Headquarters and Headquarters Company, 157th Combat Sustainment Support Battalion, at Biddle Air National Guard Base (PA)
      - 223rd Transportation Medium Truck Company (POL, 7.5K GAL) (EAB Linehaul), in Newtown Square (PA)
      - 233rd Quartermaster Company (Petroleum Support), at Biddle Air National Guard Base (PA)
      - 465th Transportation Medium Truck Company (POL, 5K GAL) (EAB Linehaul), in Bristol (PA)
      - 492nd Human Resources Company (Postal), in Bristol (PA)
        - 1st Platoon, 492nd Human Resources Company (Postal), in Millwood (WV)
        - 2nd Platoon, 492nd Human Resources Company (Postal), in Richmond (VA)
      - 978th Quartermaster Company (Supply), in Newtown Square (PA)
        - Detachment 1, 978th Quartermaster Company (Supply), in Upper Marlboro (MD)
        - Detachment 2, 978th Quartermaster Company (Supply), in Richmond (VA)
    - 378th Combat Sustainment Support Battalion, at Fort Indiantown Gap (PA)
      - Headquarters and Headquarters Company, 378th Combat Sustainment Support Battalion, at Fort Indiantown Gap (PA)
      - 298th Ordnance Company (Support Maintenance), in Johnstown (PA)
        - Detachment 1, 298th Ordnance Company (Support Maintenance), in Clearfield (PA)
      - 442nd Quartermaster Company (Field Service) (Modular), in Bellefonte (PA)
        - Detachment 1, 442nd Quartermaster Company (Field Service) (Modular), in Williamsport (PA)
      - 733rd Transportation Medium Truck Company (PLS) (EAB Tactical), in Reading (PA)
    - 413th Combat Sustainment Support Battalion, in Schenectady (NY)
      - Headquarters and Headquarters Company, 413th Combat Sustainment Support Battalion, in Schenectady (NY)
      - 490th Quartermaster Company (Supply), in Rochester (NY)
      - 618th Quartermaster Detachment (Petroleum Liaison Team), in Schenectady (NY)
      - 698th Quartermaster Company (Supply), in Nichols (NY)
      - 962nd Ordnance Company (Ammo) (Modular), in Plattsburgh (NY)
        - 1st Platoon, 962nd Ordnance Company (Ammo) (Modular), in Schenectady (NY)
      - 1018th Quartermaster Company (Petroleum Pipeline and Terminal Operation), in Schenectady (NY)
        - Detachment 1, 1018th Quartermaster Company (Petroleum Pipeline and Terminal Operation), in Mattydale (NY)
  - 475th Quartermaster Group (Petroleum Support), in Farrell (PA)
    - Headquarters and Headquarters Company, 475th Quartermaster Group (Petroleum Support), in Farrell (PA)
    - 327th Quartermaster Battalion (Petroleum Support), in Williamsport (PA)
      - Headquarters and Headquarters Detachment, 327th Quartermaster Battalion (Petroleum Support), in Williamsport (PA)
      - 14th Quartermaster Company (Water Purification and Distribution), in Greensburg (PA)
      - 254th Quartermaster Company (Field Service) (Modular), in York (PA)
      - 298th Transportation Medium Truck Company (POL, 5K GAL) (EAB Linehaul), in Franklin (PA)
      - 347th Quartermaster Company (Petroleum Pipeline and Terminal Operation), in Farrell (PA)
        - Detachment 1, 347th Quartermaster Company (Petroleum Pipeline and Terminal Operation), in St. Marys (PA)
      - 401st Quartermaster Detachment (Tactical Water Distribution Team) (Hoseline), in Lock Haven (PA)
      - 444th Human Resources Company, in Pittsburgh (PA)
        - Detachment 1, 444th Human Resources Company, in Richmond (VA)
      - 635th Quartermaster Detachment (Petroleum Liaison Team), in Farrell (PA)
    - 402nd Quartermaster Battalion (Petroleum Support), in New Castle (PA)
      - Headquarters and Headquarters Detachment, 402nd Quartermaster Battalion (Petroleum Support), in New Castle (PA)
      - 277th Quartermaster Company (Petroleum Support), in Niagara Falls (NY)
      - 326th Quartermaster Company (Water Purification and Distribution), in Cranberry Township (PA)
        - Detachment 1, 326th Quartermaster Company (Water Purification and Distribution), in Elkins (WV)
      - 328th Quartermaster Detachment (Petroleum Liaison Team), in Kingwood (WV)
      - 475th Quartermaster Company (Petroleum Support), in Kingwood (WV)
        - Detachment 1, 475th Quartermaster Company (Petroleum Support), in Meadville (PA)
      - 630th Transportation Medium Truck Company (POL, 5K GAL) (EAB Linehaul), in Washington (PA)
        - Detachment 1, 630th Transportation Medium Truck Company (POL, 5K GAL) (EAB Linehaul), at Letterkenny Army Depot (PA)
      - 864th Personnel Detachment (Theater Gateway — Personnel Accountability Team), in Coraopolis (PA)
  - 655th Regional Support Group, in Chicopee (MA)
    - Headquarters and Headquarters Company, 655th Regional Support Group, in Chicopee (MA)
    - 167th Combat Sustainment Support Battalion, in Londonderry (NH)
      - Headquarters and Headquarters Company, 167th Combat Sustainment Support Battalion, in Londonderry (NH)
      - 220th Transportation Medium Truck Company (POL, 5K GAL) (EAB Linehaul), in Keene (NH)
      - 308th Quartermaster Company (Petroleum Support), at Fort Devens (MA)
      - 619th Transportation Medium Truck Company (Cargo) (EAB Linehaul), in Auburn (ME)
        - Detachment 1, 619th Transportation Medium Truck Company (Cargo) (EAB Linehaul), in Dexter (ME)
    - 334th Quartermaster Battalion (Petroleum Support), in West Hartford (CT)
      - Headquarters and Headquarters Company, 334th Quartermaster Battalion (Petroleum Support), in West Hartford (CT)
      - 325th Transportation Medium Truck Company (POL, 5K GAL) (EAB Linehaul), in Brockton (MA)
        - Detachment 1, 325th Transportation Medium Truck Company (POL, 5K GAL) (EAB Linehaul), in Danbury (CT)
      - 439th Quartermaster Company (Petroleum Support), in Middletown (CT)
        - Detachment 1, 439th Quartermaster Company (Petroleum Support), in Brockton (MA)
    - 395th Combat Sustainment Support Battalion, in Middletown (CT)
      - Headquarters and Headquarters Company, 395th Combat Sustainment Support Battalion, in Middletown (CT)
      - 304th Quartermaster Company (Supply), in Branford (CT)
        - 2nd Platoon, 304th Quartermaster Company (Supply), at Fort Meade (MD)
      - 304th Transportation Medium Truck Company (Cargo) (EAB Linehaul), at Westover Air Reserve Base (MA)
      - 617th Quartermaster Detachment (Petroleum Liaison Team), in Middletown (CT)
      - 942nd Transportation Medium Truck Company (PLS) (EAB Tactical), in Branford (CT)
    - 719th Transportation Battalion (Movement Control), in Brockton (MA)
      - Headquarters and Headquarters Detachment, 719th Transportation Battalion (Movement Control), in Brockton (MA)
      - 743rd Transportation Company (Seaport Operations), in Roslindale (MA)
      - 801st Quartermaster Detachment (Petroleum Liaison Team), in Brockton (MA)
      - 822nd Transportation Detachment (Movement Control Team), in Brockton (MA)
      - 888th Transportation Detachment (Movement Control Team), in Cranston (RI)

Abbreviations: PLS — Palletized Load System; HET — Heavy Equipment Transporter; POL — Petroleum Oil Lubricants; EAC — Echelon Above Corps; EAB — Echelon Above Brigade

== Shoulder Sleeve Insignia ==
The 316th's unit patch is a white disc within a 1/8-inch red border, 2 inches in diameter. The colors red, white and blue represent the support rendered by the command of combat service support organizations. The blue compass represents the four cardinal points and red represents the secondary points of the compass indicating worldwide deployability and readiness of the 316th ESC. The center of the patch bears a white fleur-de lis, representing the lily, the state flower of Tennessee, and the City of Knoxville, the original home of the 316th Logistical Command.
