= McCart =

McCart is a surname. Notable people with the surname include:

- Chris McCart (born 1967), Scottish footballer
- Elaine McCart (1928–2020), American nurse and politician
- George McCart (1883–1937), Australian rules footballer
- Jamie McCart (born 1997), Scottish footballer
- John McCart (1922–1996), American politician
- William John McCart (1872–1933), Ontario merchant and politician

== See also ==
- McCart Fire Lookout, Montana
