= William Henry Acker =

American military officer

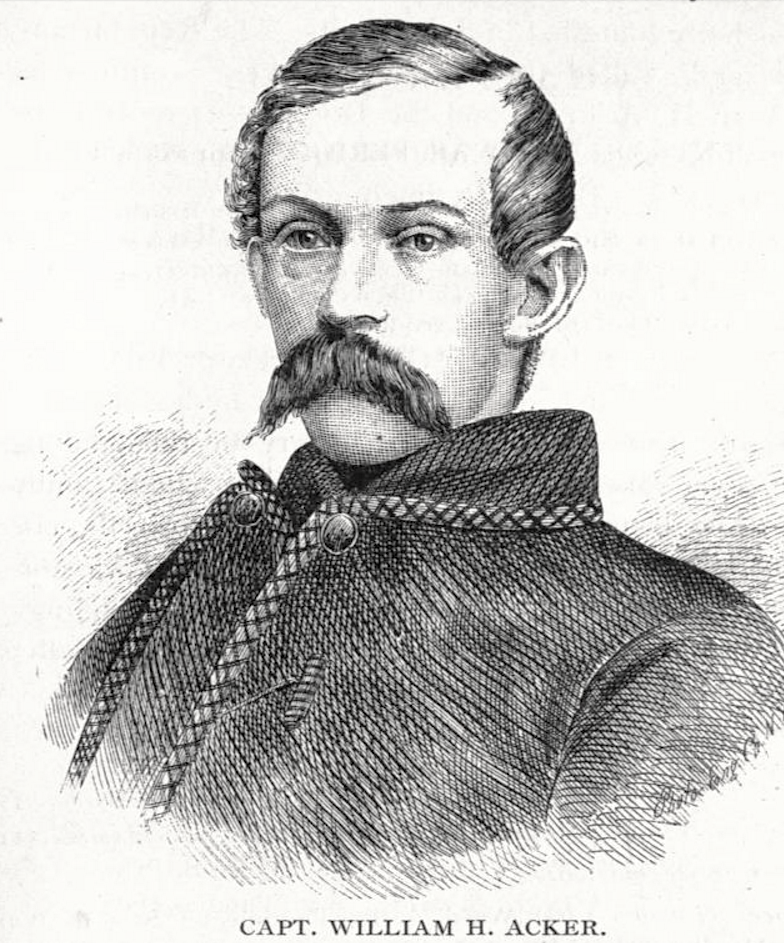
- Acker c. 1861

5th Adjutant General of Minnesota
- In office April 13, 1860 – April 24, 1861
- Preceded by: Alexander C. Jones
- Succeeded by: John B. Sanborn

Personal details
- Born: December 5, 1833 Clyde, New York, U.S.
- Died: April 7, 1862 (aged 28) Pittsburg Landing, Tennessee, U.S.
- Resting place: Oakland Cemetery; Saint Paul, Minnesota, U.S.
- Relations: Edmund Rice (brother-in-law); Henry M. Rice (brother-in-law)
- Parent: Henry Acker (father)
- Nickname: Billy

Military service
- Allegiance: United States of America
- Branch/service: Minnesota Militia; Union Army
- Years of service: 1856–1862
- Rank: Brigadier General (1860–1861); Captain (1861–1862)
- Unit: 1st Minnesota Infantry Regiment; 16th Infantry Regiment
- Commands: Company C, 1st Minnesota Infantry Regiment; 16th Infantry Regiment
- Battles/wars: American Civil War; First Battle of Bull Run (WIA); Battle of Shiloh †

William Henry Acker (December 5, 1833 – April 7, 1862) was an American lawyer and military officer who served as the fifth Adjutant General of Minnesota. Acker is considered an early reformer of the Minnesota National Guard due to his role in expanding and improving the role of the Minnesota state militia during his term as Adjutant General. Acker later served in the American Civil War where he was killed in action at the Battle of Shiloh.

== Early life and education ==
Acker was born on December 5, 1833, in Clyde, New York, he was the son of Henry Acker and Amanda Pope.^{:52}^{:396} Acker's family moved to Jackson County, Michigan where Acker's father served in the Michigan House of Representatives and later the Minnesota House of Representatives.^{:396} Acker received a commercial education before working in the mercantile trade in Michgan.^{:53}

Acker moved to Minnesota Territory in the spring of 1854 where he worked as a law clerk for William Rainey Marshall.^{:53} Acker later worked for his brother-in-law Edmund Rice and his law firm Rice, Hollinshead & Becker.^{:53}

== Military career and death ==
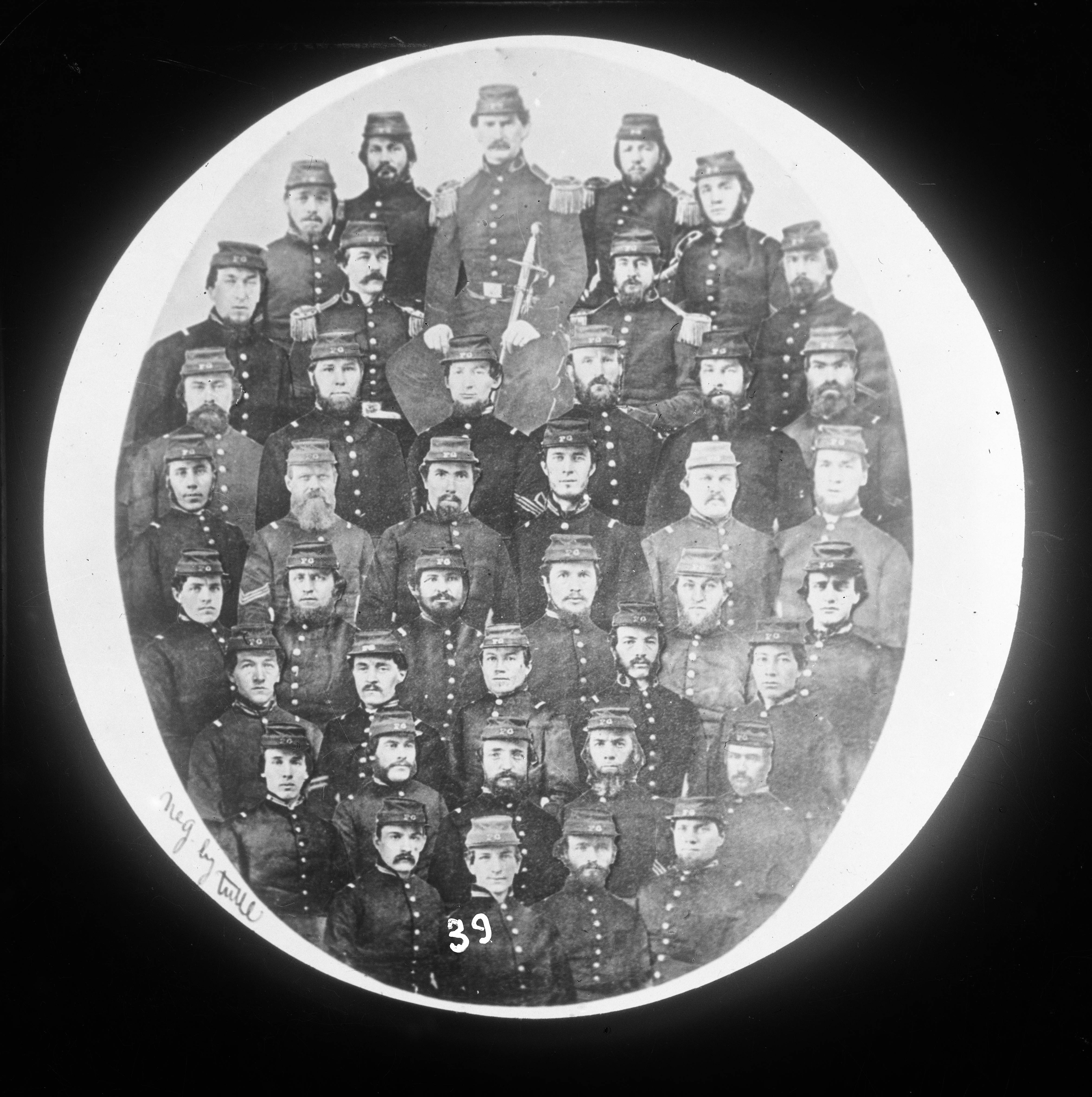
Minnesota Pioneer Guard

In 1856, Acker organized the Pioneer Guard company of Minnesota militia.^{:53} Acker originally served as the militia's fourth Sergeant and drill instructor before being unanimously elected as the militia's Captain and leader in July 1858.^{:53}

On March 19, 1860, Minnesota Governor Alexander Ramsey appointed Acker as the Adjutant General of Minnesota with the rank of Brigadier General.^{:53}^{:396} Acker pushed heavily for reforms within Minnesota's militia system and helped to organized three new companies of militia in the state by 1860.^{:54}

At the outbreak of the American Civil War Acker resigned from his appointment as Adjutant General and assisted in organizing the 1st Minnesota Infantry Regiment for service in the Union Army.^{:12} Acker was unanimously elected as the Captain of Company C of the 1st Minnesota Infantry.^{:305} Acker was wounded in the head by buckshot during the First Battle of Bull Run on April 21, 1861.^{:58}

Following the First Battle of Bull Run, Acker refused his commission in the 1st Minnesota, preferring instead to serve in the Regular Army.^{:305} Acker was commissioned as the Captain in the 16th Infantry Regiment on August 8, 1861. Acker was killed in action during the Battle of Shiloh on April 7, 1862, while leading his company. Acker was originally buried at the battlefield in Shiloh, his remains were later transported back to Saint Paul and were buried at Oakland Cemetery.^{:396}

An editorial from May 6, 1862, by St. Paul Pioneer Press noted the following on Acker's death:

"No casualty of the war has caused more unaffected sorrow to the citizens of St. Paul than the death of Captain WILLIAM HENRY ACKER; and from the time the startling news was made public there has been general desire to honor his memory".^{:61}

== Personal life ==
Acker's sister Anna Maria Acker was married to Minnesota politician Edmund Rice, the brother of Henry M. Rice.^{:53}

Acker was a personal friend and confidant of Elmer E. Ellsworth, both shared an interest in military drill and militia reform in their respective states in the years leading up to the American Civil War.^{:55}

== Legacy ==
Acker Post No. 21 of the Grand Army of the Republic in Saint Paul, Minnesota was named in honor of Acker. The post was founded on January 6, 1870, by Henry A. Castle.^{:8}
