= Isaac Van Etten =

American lawyer and politician

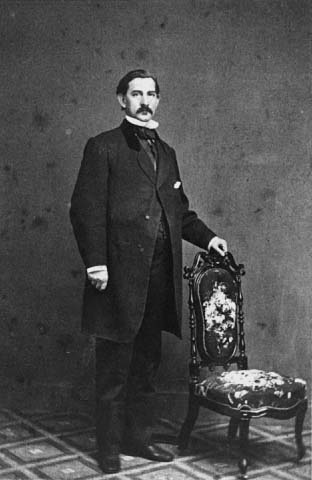
- Van Etten c. 1865

3rd Adjutant General of Minnesota Territory
- In office May 1853 – May 11, 1858
- Preceded by: Sylvanus B. Lowry
- Succeeded by: Alexander C. Jones

Member of the Minnesota Senate from the 2nd District
- In office December 2, 1857 – December 6, 1859
- Preceded by: Position established
- Succeeded by: William Sprigg Hall

Member of the Minnesota Territorial Legislature from the 2nd District
- In office January 4, 1854 – January 1, 1856

Personal details
- Born: 1826 Port Jervis, New York, U.S.
- Died: December 28, 1873 (aged 46–47) Saint Paul, Minnesota, U.S.
- Resting place: Oakland Cemetery; Saint Paul, Minnesota, U.S.
- Education: Union College (1849)
- Occupation: Lawyer, politician, military officer

Isaac Van Etten (1826 – December 29, 1873) was an American politician, lawyer, and military officer who served as the third Adjutant General of Minnesota Territory from 1853 to 1858. Van Etten also served three nonconsecutive terms in both the Minnesota Territorial Legislature and the Minnesota Legislature from 1854 to 1858.

== Early life, family, and education ==
Van Etten was born in 1826 in Port Jervis, New York. Van Etten was the son on Judge Thomas Van Etten of Orange County, New York. Van Etten's family were descendants of Jacob Jansen Van Etten, a Dutch immigrant from the city of Etten-Leur in North Brabant who settled the city of Kingston in New Netherland (now New York).

Van Etten studied law at Union College from 1848 to 1849 before working as a law clerk under Judge Samuel J. Wilkin, the father of Alexander Wilkin. Van Etten was admitted to the bar examination in New York in 1851 before moving to Minnesota Territory that same year.

== Law career ==
While in Minnesota, Van Etten settled in the state capital of Saint Paul, Minnesota. In 1853 Van Etten partnered with Alexander Wilkin and Michael E. Ames to form the law firm Ames & Van Etten. During his law career Van Etten helped organize the city of Winona, Minnesota and Wabasha County, Minnesota alongside Timothy Burns, Alexander Wilkins, Charles W. Borup, Willard B. Bunnell, Charles H. Oaks, Justin C. Ramsey, and William L. Ames. Van Etten was later involved in the platting the village of Chippewa in Chisago County, Minnesota in 1856 along with Benjamin Dinsmore as the surveyor and James Starkey, Charles S. Patteys, Michael E. Ames, and Moses Sherburne as village proprietors.

== Political career ==
=== Adjutant General ===
In 1853 Van Etten was appointed as the third Adjutant General of Minnesota Territory by Willis A. Gorman, the Territorial Governor of Minnesota. Van Etten would serve as the Adjutant General of the territory until May 11, 1858, when Minnesota was admitted to the Union, Van Etten would be succeeded by Alexander C. Jones.

=== Territorial House ===
Van Etten was elected to serve on the Minnesota Territorial Council beginning on October 12, 1853, as a Democratic representative of the Minnesota Territory's 2nd district. The 2nd district at the time consisted of Ramsey County, Minnesota. Van Etten would serve during the 5th Minnesota Territorial Legislature from January 4, 1854, to January 1, 1856. During his term Van Etten was the chair of the Engrossed Bills, Incorporations, and Territorial Affairs committees. Van Etten also served on the Judiciary, Legislative Expenditures, and Public Buildings committees.

Van Etten was re-elected to serve in the Minnesota Territorial Council on October 12, 1853. Van Etten would serve during the 6th Minnesota Territorial Legislature from January 4, 1854, to January 1, 1856. During his term Van Etten was a member of the Incorporations committee and was the chair of the Enrolled Bills, Judiciary, and the Territorial Affairs committees.

=== Minnesota Senate ===
Van Etten was elected to serve in the newly created Minnesota Senate on October 13, 1857, representing Minnesota's 2nd Senate district. Van Etten would serve in the 1st Minnesota Legislature from December 2, 1857, to December 6, 1859. During his term in the Minnesota Senate Van Etten was the chair of the Minnesota Judiciary, and served as a member of the Banks and Ways and Means committees.

=== Later appointments ===
In 1863 United States Secretary of State, William H. Seward appointed Van Etten as the Consul of the United States in Jerusalem, an appointment which Van Etten declined to serve as. Van Etten retired from politics in 1866 due to cardiovascular disease.

== Later life and death ==
Van Etten returned to his law practice in 1872 alongside Minnesota Judge L. Emmett. Van Etten died a year later on January 28, 1873, in Saint Paul, he is buried in Oakland Cemetery.

== Personal life ==
Van Etten was married to Jane Van Etten (née Oaks), together they had three children. Van Etten was the elder brother of Thomas Van Etten who served in the American Civil War in Company A of the 1st Minnesota Infantry Regiment, and later in Company I of the 9th Minnesota Infantry Regiment.
