= Henry A. Castle =

Civil War veteran and founder of a town in Minnesota

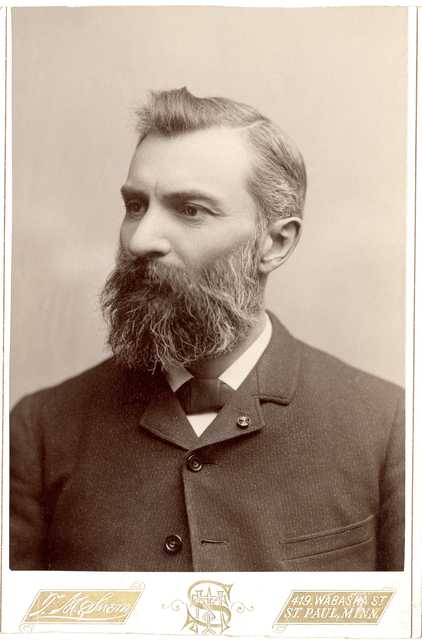
- Henry A. Castle (1888)

11th Adjutant General of Minnesota
- In office November 1, 1875 – March 1, 1876
- Preceded by: Mark Delos Flower
- Succeeded by: Horatio P. Van Cleve

postmaster of St. Paul, Minnesota
- President: Benjamin Harrison
- Preceded by: William D. Hale
- Succeeded by: Amherst W. Blakely

Personal details
- Born: August 22, 1841 Columbus, Illinois
- Died: August 16, 1916 (aged 74) North St. Paul, Minnesota
- Resting place: Oakland Cemetery (St. Paul, Minnesota)
- Spouse: Margaret W. Jaquess
- Children: 7
- Education: McKendree College
- Occupation: Merchant, Lawyer

Military service
- Years of service: 1861-1865
- Rank: Captain
- Unit: 73rd Illinois Infantry Regiment; 137th Illinois Infantry Regiment
- Battles/wars: American Civil War; Battle of Stones River

Henry Anson Castle (August 22, 1841 – August 16, 1916) was an American lawyer, Civil War captain, Adjutant General of Minnesota, politician and founder of the town of North St. Paul,

Minnesota.

== Ancestry and Early life ==
Henry's father was of English descent. His paternal 6th great-grandfather Henry Castle II immigrated to America from Wiltshire, England after 1647. Henry's mother was of Dutch and Scottish descent, his material grandfather James Frazier Jacquess was a Colonel in the American Civil War, which he later fought in.

Henry was born in 1841 to Timothy Hunt Castle (1814-1880) and Julia Anne Boyd (1812-1890). In the 1860 United States Census he listed his occupation as "student" and a year later he enlisted in the Union Army.

== Military career ==
When the Civil War broke out, Castle enlisted in the Union Army around 1861 and was put into the 73rd Illinois Infantry Regiment. He gained the rank of Sergeant Major and was discharged after being injured during the Battle of Stones River on April 19, 1863. He rejoined the army as Captain of the 137th Illinois Infantry Regiment and remained in the army until 1865.

== Post-war ==
After the war Castle met and married Margaret Wesley Jaquess and they moved to Minnesota in 1866. They first moved to St. Cloud, then St. Paul and had several children together.

=== Political career ===
In 1873, he was a member of the Minnesota State Legislature, and was appointed as the Adjutant General of Minnesota. In 1875, and served under two governors. In 1876, he became the editor-in-chief of the St. Paul Daily Dispatch and subsequently became the sole proprietor until 1885. In 1892 he was appointed as postmaster of St. Paul by President Benjamin Harrison and served for 5 years before being appointed to auditor of the Post Office Department, on May 17, 1897, by President William McKinley. During his time as postmaster, he became president of the Chamber of Commerce, president of the Library Association, commander of the Loyal Legion of Minnesota, department commander of the G.A.R., president of the board of trustees of State Soldiers' Home, president of the State Editorial Association, and was a leading member of the republican state central committee for nearly 10 years. On October 7, 1903 he retired from his post due to his declining health and personal business affair.

=== Founding of North St. Paul ===
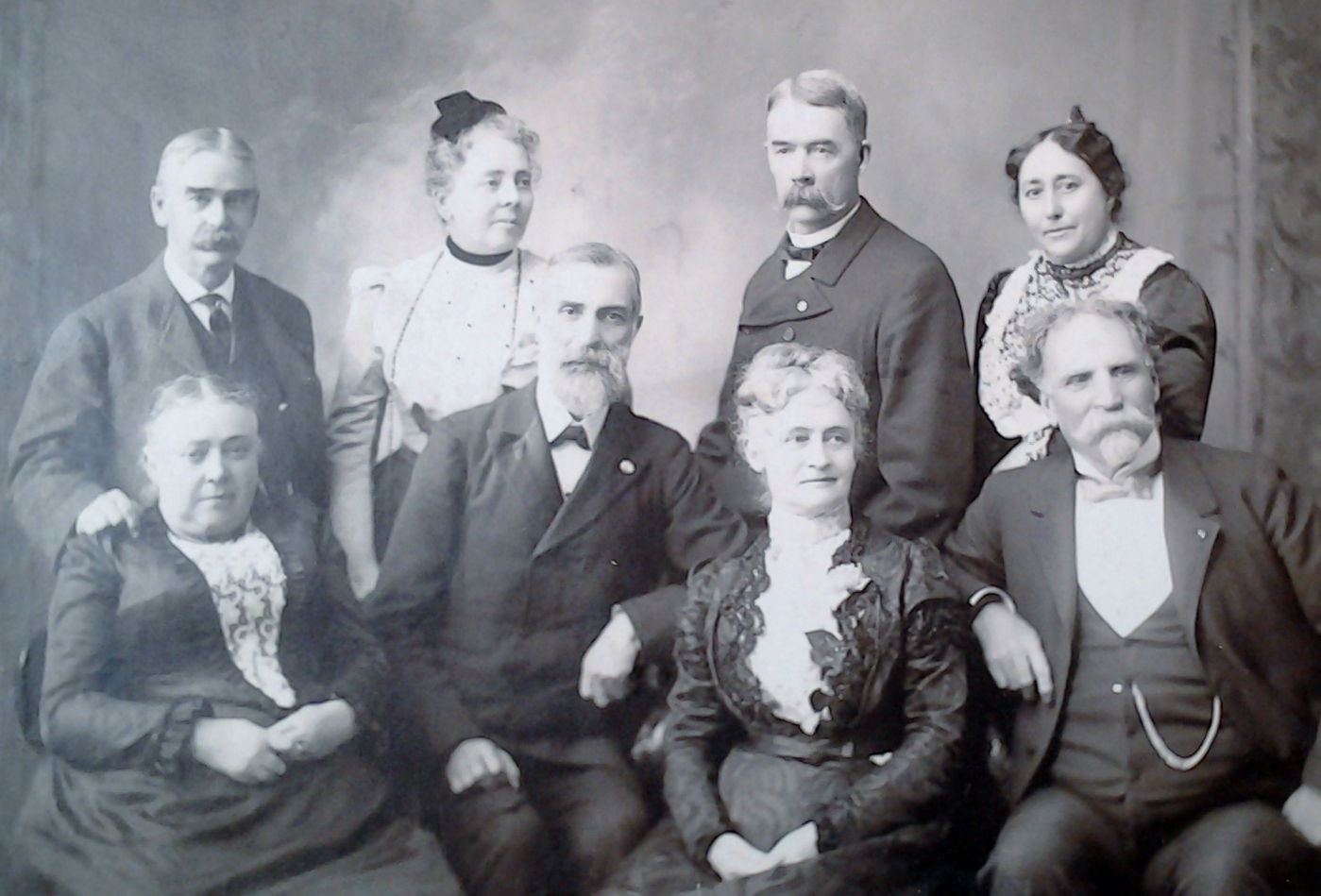
Henry Anson Castle with his associates Mark D. Flower, H.G. Hicks, J.J. McCarty and their families

In 1872, he purchased 520 acres (210 ha) of land northeast of St. Paul and by 1884 he had purchased 1200 additional arches of land and was able to use his political fame to enlist investors to join him in his development venture. In 1885 the Wisconsin Central Railroad built a track going through the area and in 1887 North St. Paul was incorporated into a town. It had "a business publication, 6 churches, over 20 retail businesses, a brick school house, 12 factories and more than 80 homes had been completed by December 1887." The town suffered financially from the Panic of 1893 which it was able to recover from in 1912 in part due to the Luger Furniture Co. and the Konantz Saddlery Co. After establishing the town Castle wrote a book in 1915 called Minnesota, its story and biography. Castle died in 1916, at the age of 75.
