= Arthur Gillette =

American orthopedic and pediatric surgeon

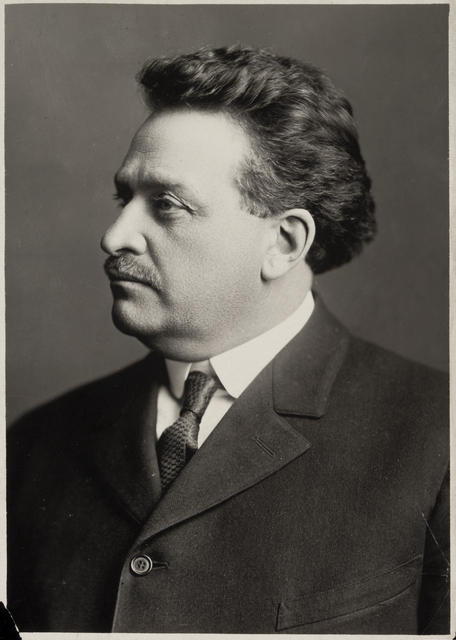
- Gillette c. 1911
- Born: Arthur Jay Gillette; October 28, 1863; Prairieville, Minnesota, U.S.
- Died: March 21, 1921 (aged 57); Saint Paul, Minnesota, U.S.
- Resting place: Oakland Cemetery, Saint Paul, Minnesota
- Education: Hamline University; Minnesota Hospital College; St. Paul Medical College
- Known for: Orthopedic surgery, pediatric surgery, founder of the Gillette Children's hospital

Arthur Jay Gillette (October 28, 1869 – March 21, 1921) was an American orthopedic and pediatric surgeon, after whom the Gillette State Hospital for Crippled Children (now the Gillette Children's Specialty Healthcare) in St. Paul, Minnesota was named.

== Early life and education ==
Gillette was born on October 28, 1869 in Prairieville, Minnesota, he was the son of Albert and Ellen Gillette. Gillette's family later moved to South St. Paul. Gillette later worked in the St. Paul stock yards before attended Hamline University in the early 1880s. In 1883, Gillette decided to become a doctor and studied at the Minnesota Hospital College and the St. Paul Medical College in downtown St. Paul. After his graduation he moved to New York and studied orthopaedic surgery under the renowned Dr. Lewis Albert Sayre and Dr. Newton Shaffer.

== Career ==
Dr. Gillette returned to Minnesota in 1888 where orthopaedic surgery became his specialty. By 1890, Dr. Gillette was Minnesota's first full-time orthopaedist and was an instructor at the University of Minnesota Medical School in what he called "this almost new science" of orthopaedic surgery.

On April 23, 1897, the legislature gave the University of Minnesota the authority to establish a "Minnesota Institute for Crippled and Indigent Children." A ward was set aside at City and County Hospital in St. Paul the state providing braces and surgical appliances at minimal cost. The regents named Dr. Gillette chief surgeon and Dr. Gillette's medical school colleagues agreed to donate their services.

Dr. Gillette married Katherine Kennedy, a school teacher at the hospital, in 1905. The couple began an annual tradition of inviting young patients to have a picnic on the grounds of their St. Paul mansion.

The number of patients Dr. Gillette served outgrew the space at City and County Hospital and the need for a separate institution was apparent. Citizens of St. Paul, the Business League and the Commercial Club of St. Paul donated 23 acres (93,000 m^{2}) in Phalen Park and its new facilities opened in 1911.

== Death and legacy ==
On March 21, 1921, Dr. Gillette died at the age of 57, he is buried in Oakland Cemetery in Saint Paul. He had been responsible for the treatment of 4,171 children. More than 80 percent were cured or discharged as improved and able to live independently. In 1925, in memory of Dr. Gillette, the hospital was renamed the Gillette State Hospital for Crippled Children (now Gillette Children's Specialty Healthcare).
