= Oscar Malmros =

American soldier and politician (1829–1909)

Adjutant General of Minnesota
- In office 1861–1865
- Governor: Alexander Ramsey; Henry Adoniram Swift; Stephen Miller
- Preceded by: John Benjamin Sanborn
- Succeeded by: John Peller

Consul to Rouen
- In office 1905–1909

Personal details
- Born: c.1825 Duchy of Schleswig, Danish Unitary State
- Died: August 09, 1909 (83) Rouen, France
- Other political affiliations: Republican Party of Minnesota
- Occupation: Lawyer; Adjutant General; Politician; Diplomat

Military service
- Allegiance: United States; Minnesota
- Branch/service: Minnesota Militia
- Years of service: 1861–1865
- Rank: Brigadier General
- Commands: Adjutant General of Minnesota
- Battles/wars: American Civil War; Dakota War of 1862

Oscar Malmros (c. 1825 – August 9, 1909) was a Danish German (Dänische Deutsche) diplomat, lawyer, soldier, and statesman in early Minnesota history. From 1861 to 1865, during the American Civil War, Malmros served as the Adjutant General of Minnesota under Alexander Ramsey, Henry Adoniram Swift, and Stephen Miller. Following the war, Malmros served as a consul to several countries on behalf of the United States Government.

== Early life ==
Malmros was born in the Duchy of Schleswig, then a part of the Danish Unitary State in 1825. The Duchy was later transferred to the Kingdom of Prussia following the Schleswig–Holstein question and the Second Schleswig War. Malmros immigrated to the United States in 1852 first settling in Milwaukee in Wisconsin, but later choosing to move to Minnesota Territory in 1853, ultimately living in Saint Paul, Minnesota.

While in Minnesota Malmros worked as a lawyer and consultant, during this time Malmros was heavily affiliated with the Republican Party of Minnesota. In 1860 Malmros is advertised a multitude of times as a contract attorney throughout the Minnesota Staats-Zeitung (the Minnesota State-Gazette), a German American newspaper. In 1860 Malmros was approached by J. B. Simonton, a local lawyer, with a business opportunity to start a law firm based out of St. Paul. Eventually the two men founded Simonton & Malmros, which practiced "in all state courts and in the United States Court". Malmros later ran in the November 1860 election for the seat of County Commissioner for Ramsey County, Minnesota.

== Political Career in Minnesota ==
Malmros eventually worked for the Republican Party of Minnesota on the political campaign staff for Alexander Ramsey during the 1859 Minnesota gubernatorial election. Shortly after Ramsey's victory, Ramsey appointed Malmros as the Adjutant General of Minnesota, he had been preceded as Adjutant General by John B. Sanborn. From 1861-1865 Malmros served as Minnesota's Adjutant General during the course of the American Civil War. Malmros was also appointed as the acting Quartermaster General of Minnesota during the war.

While serving as Adjutant General during the Dakota War of 1862, Malmros issued an order for bounties of $75 to be awarded for the deaths and scalps of Dakota men who had taken part in the Dakota Uprising, one of these men was Little Crow who was later killed on July 3, 1863 by Nathan Lamson and his son Chauncey. The Lamsons later received $500 for the killing of Little Crow. Malmros retired from his position as Adjutant General of Minnesota on May 15, 1865 with the rank of Brigadier General. Malmros was replaced as Adjutant General by John Peller (1830-1878), the Regimental Adjutant of the 1st Minnesota Infantry Regiment.

== Diplomat ==
Following the war and his service as Adjutant General, Malmros served as a diplomat for a number of American Consulates including; the Ottoman Empire, Winnipeg, Colón, and Rouen. Malmros' first appointed position as an American consul was to Galata, a neighborhood of Istanbul in the Ottoman Empire in March, 1865. Malmros was later sent as a consul to Winnipeg, known previously as Fort Garry, in the Red River Colony on July 1, 1869. Publication in an official American Senate document of his consular report on September 11, 1869 heavily criticized both the Hudson's Bay Company and the Roman Catholic clergy, which led Malmros to find his position in Fort Garry “untenable” by March 1870. Malmros was and eyewitness to the Red River Rebellion under Louis Riel and actively supported Riel and Winnipeg to secede from Canada along with Enos Stutsman. Malmros went as far as to write to the State Department to give financial support to the Métis resistance in Canada, a demand of which was fully backed by Alexander Ramsey and his appeal to President of the United States Ulysses S. Grant. During the Secession of Panama from Colombia Malmros was appointed as an American consul to Panama under Porfirio Méndez, the Civil and Military Chief in Colón, Panama. Malmros' final appointed office was as the American consul to Rouen from 1905-1909.

== Later Life and Death ==
While serving for the American Consulate at Rouen, Malmros died unexpectedly at the age of 83 on August 9, 1909. According to his obituary listed in the Warren Sheaf, Malmros had wished to die and be buried in Minnesota and had saved a large amount of money to live the final years of his life in Minnesota. With no family or listed heirs his burial or whereabouts are still unknown.

== Legacy ==
Malmros's perspective and reflections of the Dakota War of 1862 can be read in Mary Hawker Bakeman's book Perspective of the Sioux War: Oscar Malmros, Minnesota's Adjutant General: reports of the Adjutant General to the Governor of Minnesota, September 1862 & January 1863.
