= Robert Giebink =

American physician and politician

Robert Rodger Giebink (December 4, 1916 – January 27, 2008) was an American physician and politician.

Giebink was born on December 4, 1916, in St. Petersburg, Florida, to parents Henry and Jennie, originally from Orange City, Iowa. Giebink attended Orange City High School and subsequently enrolled at the University of Iowa. Following the death of his father, Giebink transferred nearer home, completing his undergraduate degree at Northwestern Junior College. He played baseball at Northwestern, and performed in musical groups affiliated with the college. Giebink continued his career as a student athlete on the golf team of the University of Minnesota, as he was accepted to the University of Minnesota School of Law in 1936. After one year, Giebink decided to study medicine. He earned a medical degree in 1942, from the University of Minnesota Medical School. He enlisted in the United States Army Reserve, completing an internship at Minneapolis General Hospital before receiving active duty status as a member of the United States Medical Corps. Originally assigned to an American military hospital in Paris, Giebink was soon transferred to the 120th Infantry Regiment. For actions during the Battle of the Bulge, Giebink was awarded the Bronze Star, an oak leaf cluster, and a Purple Heart. He was discharged in 1945, and began a medical residency. Giebink's residency in orthopedics lasted three years, and was split between Minneapolis General, Minneapolis Veterans Affairs Hospital, Gillette Children's Specialty Healthcare, and Shriners Hospitals for Children in Minneapolis. In 1950, he cofounded what became known as the Park Nicollet Clinic. From 1953, Giebink operated a medical practice in Sioux Falls. He retired from medicine in the 1980s.

Giebink helped establish the Sioux Vocational School for the Handicapped, later known as South Dakota Achieve, in the 1950s. He was also active in Dakotabilities, another advocacy organization for people with disabilities, as well as other civic service groups. A Republican, Giebink served in the South Dakota House of Representatives from 1969 until his resignation on May 21, 1971, after which he was replaced by David Vigen. He returned to the state legislature in the 1980s, serving two years in the state house from 1981 to 1982, immediately followed by a two-year stint within the South Dakota Senate, representing District 11 alongside Tom Krueger and Henry Carlson Jr. He died on January 27, 2008.
