= Walcott Township, Rice County, Minnesota =

Walcott Township, Minnesota
- Township
- Location within the state of Minnesota Walcott Township, Minnesota (the United States)
- Coordinates: 44°13′55″N 93°14′31″W
- Country: United States
- State: Minnesota
- County: Rice

Area
  - Total: 33.7 sq mi (87.3 km^{2})
  - Land: 33.7 sq mi (87.2 km^{2})
  - Water: 0.039 sq mi (0.1 km^{2})
- Elevation: 1,194 ft (364 m)

Population (2000)
  - Total: 984
  - Density: 29/sq mi (11.3/km^{2})
- Time zone: UTC-6 (Central (CST))
  - Summer (DST): UTC-5 (CDT)
- FIPS code: 27-67666
- GNIS feature ID: 0665896

Walcott Township is a township in Rice County, Minnesota, United States. The population was 984 at the 2000 census. The unincorporated communities of Prairieville and Ruskin are both partially located within the township.

Settled in the 1850s, Walcott Township was named for Samuel Walcott, an early settler.

== Geography ==
According to the United States Census Bureau, the township has a total area of 33.7 square miles (87.3 km^{2}), of which 33.7 square miles (87.2 km^{2}) is land and 0.04 square mile (0.1 km^{2}) (0.06%) is water. The Straight River flows northwardly through the township.

== Demographics ==
As of the census of 2000, there were 984 people, 334 households, and 276 families residing in the township. The population density was 29.2 inhabitants per square mile (11.3/km^{2}). There were 343 housing units at an average density of 10.2/sq mi (3.9/km^{2}). The racial makeup of the township was 98.78% White, 0.10% Native American, 0.61% Asian, 0.30% from other races, and 0.20% from two or more races. Hispanic or Latino of any race were 0.51% of the population.

There were 334 households, out of which 42.2% had children under the age of 18 living with them, 75.4% were married couples living together, 3.3% had a female householder with no husband present, and 17.1% were non-families. 14.1% of all households were made up of individuals, and 5.7% had someone living alone who was 65 years of age or older. The average household size was 2.92 and the average family size was 3.25.

In the township the population was spread out, with 29.3% under the age of 18, 6.9% from 18 to 24, 27.3% from 25 to 44, 24.8% from 45 to 64, and 11.7% who were 65 years of age or older. The median age was 38 years. For every 100 females, there were 106.3 males. For every 100 females age 18 and over, there were 111.6 males.

The median income for a household in the township was $58,594, and the median income for a family was $63,036. Males had a median income of $38,482 versus $25,556 for females. The per capita income for the township was $20,274. About 1.4% of families and 4.0% of the population were below the poverty line, including 3.9% of those under age 18 and 7.3% of those age 65 or over.
