= Alexander C. Jones =

American lawyer and diplomat (1830–1898)

United States Consul to Chongqing
- In office 1886–1898

United States Consul to Nagasaki
- In office 1880–1886
- Preceded by: Willie P. Mangum
- Succeeded by: John Birch

1st Minnesota Adjutant General
- In office May, 1858 – April 13, 1860
- Appointed by: Henry Hastings Sibley
- Preceded by: Isaac Van Etten
- Succeeded by: William Henry Acker

Personal details
- Born: Alexander Caldwell Jones; 1830 Moundsville, Virginia U.S.
- Died: January 13, 1898 (aged 67–68) Chongqing, China
- Occupation: Lawyer, diplomat, editor of the National Intelligencer

Military service
- Allegiance: United States; Confederate States; Second Mexican Empire
- Branch/service: United States Army; Confederate States Army
- Rank: Brigadier General
- Unit: 44th Virginia Infantry Regiment
- Battles/wars: American Civil War; Battle of Gaines' Mill (WIA)

Alexander Caldwell Jones (1830 – January 13, 1898) was an American lawyer, journalist, diplomat, and Confederate States Army officer during the American Civil War. Jones served as the first Adjutant General of Minnesota.

== Early life ==
He was born in 1830 near Moundsville, West Virginia, at that time a part of Virginia, to Garrison B. Jones and Martha Houston. He enrolled at Virginia Military Institute on July 28, 1846, and was graduated on July 4, 1850.

He then studied law and moved to Minnesota territory, where he became a district attorney and served as probate judge in St. Paul, Minnesota. From 1858 to 1860 he served as the Adjutant General of Minnesota.

== Civil War ==
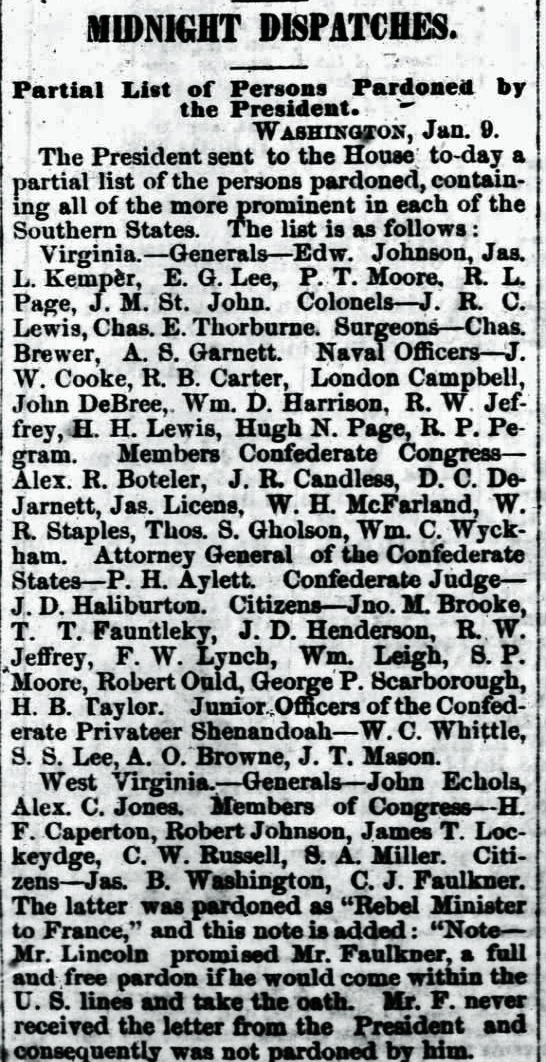
Presidential pardons for ex-Confederates from Virginia and West Virginia, published in the Wilmington (N.C.) Daily Dispatch, Jan. 10, 1867

When his native state declared its secession from the United States in 1861 he returned to Virginia, where he joined the 44th Virginia Infantry. He was commissioned a lieutenant-colonel on May 1, 1862, and was wounded in the Battle of Gaines's Mill.

After convalescing from his injuries and serving in the Bureau of Conscription he resigned his commission on June 16, 1863, and requested a transfer to the Trans-Mississippi Dept. There he served on John Bankhead Magruder's staff and was then given the command of a Texas brigade of infantry. Gen. Kirby Smith recommended his promotion to brigadier-general on March 16, 1865, although there is no confirmation of his appointment. Jones was paroled in Brownsville, Texas on July 24, 1865, as a "brigadier-general". He was given a presidential pardon, dated August 15, 1865, sponsored by the Attorney General and the Hon. J. J. Jackson, which described him as a "rebel brigadier general".

== Later life ==
Jones left for Mexico to serve under Emperor Maximilian until the fall of his regime. He then returned to West Virginia, and lived in Wheeling with his wife Ella Clemens' family. He became the editor of the National Intelligencer, but that newspaper failed in 1869.

In 1880 he was appointed U.S. Consul in Nagasaki and was transferred in 1886 to the China embassy in Chongqing, where he died on Jan. 13, 1898.
