= James Allen (Medal of Honor) =

Irish-born Union Army soldier (1843–1913)

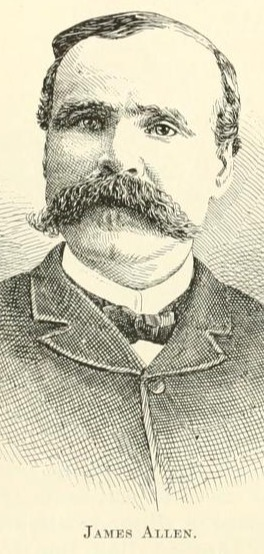
- Allen c. 1897
- Born: May 5, 1843; Ireland
- Died: August 31, 1913 (aged 70); Saint Paul, Minnesota, U.S.
- Burial place: Oakland Cemetery, Saint Paul, Minnesota
- Military career
- Allegiance: United States; Union
- Branch: United States Army; Union Army
- Service years: 1861 - 1863
- Rank: Corporal
- Units: Company F, 16th New York Volunteer Infantry Regiment
- Conflicts: American Civil War
- Awards: Medal of Honor

James Allen (May 5, 1843 – August 31, 1913) was an Irish-born Union Army soldier during the American Civil War. He earned the Medal of Honor for bravery at the Battle of South Mountain on September 14, 1862, during the Maryland campaign.

On April 24, 1861, shortly after the outbreak of the American Civil War, James Allen enlisted in Company F of the 16th New York Infantry. He earned the Medal of Honor for gallantry in action at the Battle of South Mountain on September 14, 1862. During the battle, Allen singlehandedly captured 14 Confederate soldiers of the 16th Georgia Infantry, who had mistakenly believed they were opposed by a superior force. Allen also captured a Confederate flag in this action.

Allen was discharged along with the rest of the 16th New York in May 1863, but continued to serve the Union cause as a member of the railroad service. Allen was awarded the Medal of Honor on September 11, 1890.

After the war, Allen lived in St. Paul, Minnesota and was a member of the Garfield Post of the Grand Army of the Republic. Allen died on August 31, 1913, and was laid to rest in the Oakland Cemetery in St. Paul.

== Medal of Honor citation ==
- Rank and organization: Private, Company F, 16th New York Infantry.
- Place and date: At South Mountain, Maryland, September 14, 1862.
- Entered service at: Potsdam, New York
- Born: May 6, 1843, Ireland.
- Date of issue: September 11, 1890.

Citation:

Single-handed and slightly wounded he accosted a squad of 14 Confederate soldiers bearing the colors of the 16th Georgia Infantry (C.S.A.). By an imaginary ruse he secured their surrender and kept them at bay when the regimental commander discovered him and rode away for assistance.

== See also ==
- List of Medal of Honor recipients
- List of American Civil War Medal of Honor recipients: A–F
