= Henry Acker =

American politician

Member of the Minnesota House of Representatives
- In office January 8, 1861 – January 6, 1862
- Constituency: 1st district
- In office December 7, 1859 – January 7, 1861
- Constituency: 2nd district

Speaker of the Michigan House of Representatives
- In office January 8, 1840 – 1841
- Preceded by: Kinsley S. Bingham
- Succeeded by: Philo C. Fuller

Member of the Michigan House of Representatives from the Jackson County district
- In office January 1, 1839 – 1841

Personal details
- Born: June 6, 1804
- Died: August 31, 1874 or 1875 Saint Paul, Ramsey County, Minnesota
- Resting place: Oakland Cemetery, Saint Paul, Minnesota, U.S.
- Party: Whig (1838-1841); Republican (1859-1862)
- Spouse: Amanda
- Children: 4

Henry Acker (June 6, 1804 – August 31, 1874 or 1875) was an American politician who served as a member of the Michigan House of Representatives and then as a member of the Minnesota House of Representatives.

== Early life ==
Acker was born on June 6, 1804, likely in New York.

== Political career ==
Acker served two terms in the Michigan House of Representatives, first being elected on November 5, 1838. He was then sworn in on January 7, 1839. When he was re-elected in 1840, he also served as Speaker of the Michigan House of Representatives. In 1857, Acker moved to Minnesota, where he would serve two terms in the Minnesota House of Representatives. Sometime between being elected the Michigan and Minnesota legislature, Acker switched from being a Whig to a Republican.

== Personal life ==
Acker married a woman named Amanda, and together they had four children, one of them being Captain William Henry Acker, who was killed in the Battle of Shiloh in 1862.

== Death ==
Acker's death date is disputed. Some sources claim he died on August 31, 1875, but his grave at Oakland Cemetery in Saint Paul, Ramsey County, Minnesota claims he died on the same day in 1874.
