= Albert W. McMillan =

Medal of Honor recipient

- Medal of Honor 1862–1895 Army version
- Born: October 13, 1862; Stillwater, Minnesota
- Died: October 2, 1948 (aged 85); Sacramento, California
- Burial place: Oakland Cemetery; Saint Paul, Minnesota
- Relatives: Samuel J. R. McMillan (father)
- Military career
- Allegiance: United States of America
- Branch: United States Army
- Service years: 1887 - 1891
- Rank: Sergeant Major
- Nickname: The Princeton Tiger
- Units: E Troop, 7th Cavalry Regiment
- Conflicts: Sioux Wars: Wounded Knee Massacre
- Awards: Medal of Honor

Albert Walter McMillan (October 13, 1862 - October 2, 1948) was a soldier, lawyer, and Medal of Honor recipient from Minnesota who took part in the Wounded Knee Massacre during the Ghost Dance War on December 29, 1890.

== Early life and education ==
McMillan was born on October 13, 1862 in Stillwater, Minnesota, he was the son of Samuel J. R. McMillan and Harriet McMillan (née Butler). McMillan studied at Princeton University from 1883 to 1885 and was class president in 1884. In 1883, McMillan served in a clerkship position for the United States Senate Committee on the Judiciary.

== Military service ==
McMillan joined the United States Army on August 15, 1887 at Jefferson Barracks in Missouri. He was assigned to Troop E of the 7th Cavalry Regiment under the command of Captain Charles Stillman Ilsley, a veteran of the American Civil War. Recognized by Captain Ilsley as an educated and talented man McMillan was quickly promoted to Sergeant.

=== Wounded Knee Massacre ===
The 7th Cavalry was deployed to Pine Ridge Indian Reservation on December 29, 1890 in order to disarm the Miniconjou Lakota and the Hunkpapa Lakota under Chief Spotted Elk near Porcupine Butte in South Dakota. The botched disarmament of Spotted Elk's band of Lakota led to the ensuing Wounded Knee Massacre which ended up killing between 250 and 300 Lakota people. During the ensuing firefight, McMillan and Sergeant William G. Austin were noted for leading E Troop of the 7th Cavalry in concentrating their rifle fire into a nearby ravine and for their continued effort in supporting their men and attempting to "dislodge the enemy" from the vicinity.

When the 7th Cavalry's Sergeant Major Richard Winick Corwine was killed on December 29, 1890, McMillan was promoted to Sergeant Major the following day. In April 1891 he requested to be demoted in rank to Private.

== Medal of Honor citation ==
McMillan was awarded the Medal of Honor for his actions at Wounded Knee on June 23, 1891. McMillan's Medal of Honor citation reads as follows:

"The President of the United States of America, in the name of Congress, takes pleasure in presenting the Medal of Honor to Sergeant Albert Walter McMillian, United States Army, for extraordinary heroism on 29 December 1890, while serving with Company E, 7th U.S. Cavalry, in action at Wounded Knee Creek, South Dakota. While engaged with Indians concealed in a ravine, Sergeant McMillian assisted the men on the skirmish line, directed their fire, encouraged them by example, and used every effort to dislodge the enemy".

Twenty five total soldiers were recommended the Medal of Honor at Wounded Knee, however, only twenty were approved, McMillan being among them.^{:203,205} Four total men from Company E are listed in the original citation for the medals.^{:205} In 2024 United States Secretary of Defense, Lloyd Austin ordered a review that none of the medals were recognized for conduct which was inconsistent with the Medal of Honor. A year later Secretary of Defense, Pete Hegseth decided that the soldiers would keep their medals.

== Later life ==
Following Wounded Knee, McMillan studied at the University of Minnesota and graduated with a bachelors degree in law in 1894. He later worked as the legal editor of the West Publishing Company in Eagan, Minnesota. After the war he likely suffered from a form of post-traumatic stress disorder and had difficulties with employment because of it. He served in the International Red Cross and Red Crescent Movement during World War I, later retiring in Sacramento, California where he died on October 2, 1948 at the age of 85. He is buried in Oakland Cemetery in Saint Paul, Minnesota next to his father Samuel.
