= Saint Paul Dispatch =

Newspaper

The Saint Paul Dispatch was a daily newspaper in Saint Paul, Minnesota from 1868 until 1985.

== Hall and Castle years ==
When Harlan Hall founded the Dispatch in 1868, he made no secret of his political affiliations. In the 1800s newspapers openly aligned with political parties and the Dispatch was no exception. Under Hall's leadership, the paper initially supported the insurgent wing of the Republican Party. David Ramaley, an active Republican, served as the Dispatch's publisher.

But Hall (who was the great-uncle of the Minnesota sports broadcaster Halsey Hall) switched parties in the mid-1870s and became a Democrat. When Hall sold the Dispatch in 1878, the newspaper reflected Hall's Democratic affiliation.

With the change of ownership in 1878, however, the paper's political orientation once again transformed "overnight." Hall sold the paper to Henry Anson Castle, who made the Dispatch "an aggressive Republican organ." A Union Army veteran, Castle was active in the Minnesota Republican Party and held a seat in the state legislature in the 1870s. Castle also played a leading role in the successful 1874 gubernatorial campaign of Cushman Kellogg Davis. Castle briefly turned over editorial duties in 1880 to Lucius Nieman, who later founded The Milwaukee Journal. But otherwise Castle set the Dispatch's editorial direction until 1885.

== George Thompson and the Dispatch Printing Company ==
George Thompson, an Anglo-American banker and entrepreneur, purchased the Dispatch in 1885. Thompson was born in Devonshire, England, in 1840. After graduating from Eton College and Oxford University, he worked for 17 years as a banker at Willis, Percival & Co. When the bank collapsed, Thompson took his father's advice and immigrated to the United States in 1882. He worked as an advertising salesman at the Joliet News before moving to Minnesota. He married Abigail Ione Wheeler in 1885 and they settled in St. Paul.

The Dispatch was sold in 1885 by Henry A. Castle to George Thompson and George K. Shaw. Thompson then established the Dispatch Printing Company. His wife, Abigail, was co-owner of the Dispatch and he relied heavily on her advice in running the newspaper. The Dispatch Printing Company bought the St. Paul Pioneer Press in 1909 and managed the two newspapers as independent news outlets. The Pioneer Press became the city's daily morning newspaper and the Dispatch became the city's daily evening newspaper.

Thompson was a staunch Republican and the Dispatch advocated on behalf of Republican candidates. As a long-standing at-large delegate to the Republican National Convention, he wrote the gold standard into the Republican platform. Thompson was a friend of William McKinley, Theodore Roosevelt, William Howard Taft, and many other national officeholders.

Thompson had a Patek Philippe watch custom made for him in 1914 that was sold at auction by Sotheby's in May 2006 for $1.54 million.

When George Thompson died in 1917, Charles K. Blandin bought a controlling interest in the Dispatch Printing Company. After Abigail Thompson died in 1923, Blandin took over the remaining shares in the company. Blandin operated the newspaper until he sold it to Ridder Publications in 1927.

Ridder Publications (which later became Knight Ridder) acquired both the Dispatch and the St. Paul Pioneer Press in 1927. As a young man, Robert Ridder, the philanthropist and co-founder of the Minnesota North Stars, worked as a Dispatch reporter.

== The 1978 election controversy ==
In 1978 the Dispatch became involved in an election dispute that ended up before the Minnesota Supreme Court. In October 1978, William G. Sumner, the Dispatch's editor, interviewed a state legislative candidate named Bob Pavlak. An Independent-Republican, Pavlak ran for the District 67A state legislative seat against the incumbent, Arnold Kempe, a member of the Minnesota Democratic–Farmer–Labor Party.

During the Dispatch interview, Pavlak produced documents that indicated that Kempe had missed over 300 roll call votes during the 1977 and 1978 legislative sessions. Pavlak warned the Dispatch that there might be computational errors in the documents.

On Saturday, November 4, 1978—three days before the election—the Dispatch printed an editorial in which it asserted that the editors "have seen nothing to dispute his [Pavlak's] research report that shows the incumbent voted four times in 1967-68 this out of more than 300 opportunities." The editorial misstated the years in question as 1967-68 rather than 1977–78. But the real problem with the editorial was its misrepresentation of Kempe's voting record. In fact, Kempe only missed 329 votes out of 1,798 roll call votes, not 325 votes out of 329 as the Dispatch's editorial erroneously suggested. Pavlak's campaign subsequently informed the Dispatch editors that they had misstated the year, but did not make mention of the newspaper's erroneous tabulation of Kempe's roll call votes.

The Minnesota Supreme Court later concluded that copies of the November 4 edition of the Dispatch reached at least 6,000 eligible voters in the district before Election Day. In addition, the Pavlak campaign circulated over 1,800 reprints of the editorial in five St. Paul and West St. Paul precincts. On Monday, November 6, the Dispatch printed a second editorial, this time asserting that it had "erred in our endorsement of Robert Pavlak, IR, who is seeking to unseat Rep. Arnold Kempe in 67A. Pavlak's research report stated Kempe voted four times during the years 1977-78, not, as incorrectly reported, 1967-68." But the second editorial failed to correct the major factual error in the November 4 editorial.

At the November 7 election, Pavlak narrowly defeated Kempe by a margin of 4,454 votes to 4,133.

The Minnesota Supreme Court ultimately determined that Pavlak's campaign had violated Minnesota's Fair Campaign Practices Act by circulating the reprinted copies of the erroneous editorial. As the majority explained:

"[I]t is our conclusion that Mr. Pavlak violated Minn.St. 210A.04 and that this violation was "deliberate, serious and material" within the meaning of Minn.St. 209.02. It was deliberate in the sense that the distribution of the statement as worded was intentional and was intended to affect the voting at the election. It was serious because the distribution of 1,800-1,900 reprints in a single legislative district is a far from trivial amount. It was material because voting is the essence of a representative's position, and attacking voting performance is germane to one's conduct in that position."

But citing to the Minnesota Constitution, the majority concluded that the court had no authority to overturn the election results. Section 6 of Article IV of the Minnesota Constitution provides that: "Each house shall be the judge of the election returns and eligibility of its own members." The Court thus concluded that "[i]n short, we have no jurisdiction to issue a final and binding decision in this matter, and our opinion by statute will be and by the Minnesota Constitution must only be advisory to the House of Representatives."

Pavlak took his seat in the Minnesota House of Representatives on January 3, 1979. However, the House immediately investigated the allegation that Pavlak's campaign violated state election law by circulating the editorial reprints. The contest's resolution ultimately came down to a party line vote. Following the 1978 elections, the state house was perfectly divided between Independent Republicans and DFLers: 67 seats to 67. But House rules prohibited Pavlak from voting on his own election contest. Accordingly, with party loyalty shaping how both sides viewed the contest, the House voted by a margin of 67 to 66 that Pavlak had violated the election law.

Pavlak's seat was declared vacated and the House directed that a special election be held for the seat. Pavlak ran in the special election, but lost to Frank Rodriguez, Sr., the first Hispanic ever elected to the Minnesota legislature.

== Demise of the Dispatch name ==
Knight Ridder continued to publish the Pioneer Press and Dispatch as independent daily newspapers until 1985, when they merged to become the St. Paul Pioneer Press and Dispatch. In 1990 the owners dropped the word Dispatch from the name, bringing to an end the Dispatch's 122-year run as a prominent feature on the St. Paul media landscape.
