= North St. Paul, Minnesota =

City in Minnesota, United States

North Saint Paul, Minnesota
- City
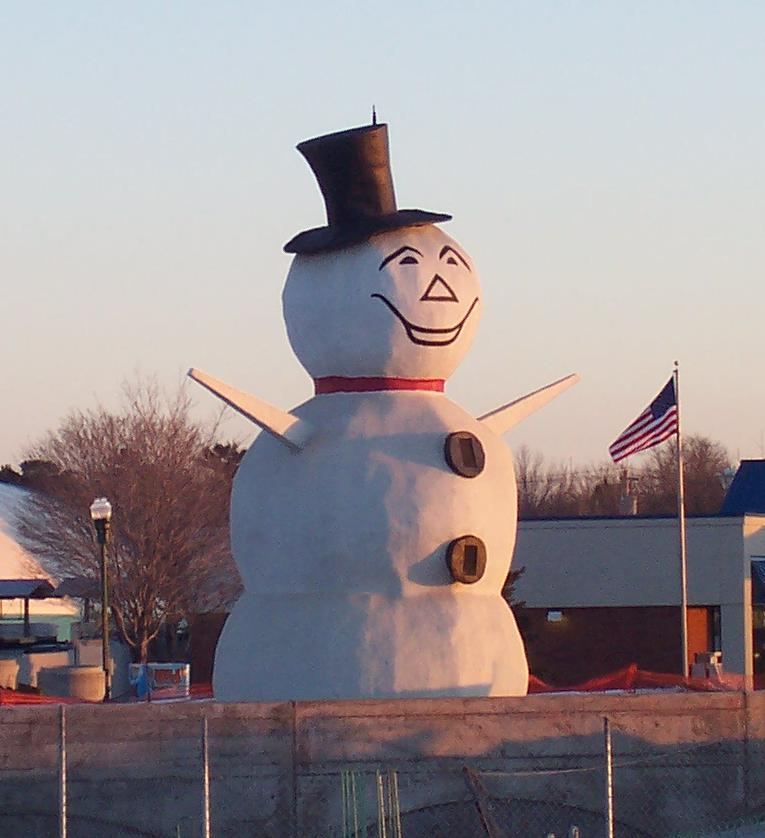
- The North Saint Paul Snowman

- Logo
- Motto: "Extraordinary"
- Location of the city of North Saint Paul within Ramsey County, Minnesota
- Coordinates: 45°0′46″N 92°59′54″W
- Country: United States
- State: Minnesota
- County: Ramsey
- Incorporated: 1887

Government
  - Mayor: John Monge

Area
  - Total: 3.01 sq mi (7.80 km^{2})
  - Land: 2.86 sq mi (7.40 km^{2})
  - Water: 0.16 sq mi (0.41 km^{2})
- Elevation: 955 ft (291 m)

Population (2020)
  - Total: 12,364
  - Estimate (2023): 12,574
  - Density: 4,329.2/sq mi (1,671.52/km^{2})
- Time zone: UTC−6 (Central (CST))
  - Summer (DST): UTC−5 (CDT)
- ZIP Code: 55109
- Area code: 651
- FIPS code: 27-47221
- GNIS feature ID: 2395261
- Sales tax: 8.375%
- Website: northstpaul.org

North Saint Paul (abbreviated North St. Paul) is a city in Ramsey County, Minnesota, United States, located east-northeast of the city of Saint Paul. The population was 12,364 at the 2020 census.

North Saint Paul is a distinct city, and not a neighborhood of nearby Saint Paul. This fact also contributes to a major difference from typical suburbs; rather than being composed of new developments and urban sprawl, many of the structures in town are older, including a downtown area of brick storefronts.

On the east side of the Margaret Street bridge over Minnesota State Highway 36 resides the 20-ton North Saint Paul Snowman. As the official city logo of North Saint Paul, it was constructed on Margaret and 7th Streets from 1971 to 1974 by Lloyd Koesling and moved to its current location in 1990.

== History ==
North St. Paul was originally called Castle, and under the latter name was laid out in 1887 by Henry Anson Castle when the Wisconsin Central Railroad was extended to that point.

North St. Paul boasts the oldest continuously operating bar in Minnesota, Neumann's Bar, in its historic downtown area. The original bar opened for business in 1887, and has continuously operated as an establishment serving alcoholic beverages ever since. Even during Prohibition, they served near beer in the main bar, and opened a speakeasy upstairs. Visitors can still go upstairs and see the keyhole door used to screen entrants, and the old telephone that was connected to the downstairs bar so that messages could be passed back and forth.

== Geography ==
According to the United States Census Bureau, the city has a total area of 3.01 sq mi (7.80 km^{2}), of which 2.85 sq mi (7.38 km^{2}) is land and 0.16 sq mi (0.41 km^{2}) is water. Silver Lake and Casey Lake are the city's largest bodies of water and both have large, adjacent parks.

== Demographics ==
Historical population
Census	Pop.	Note	%±
1890	1,099		—
1900	1,110		1.0%
1910	1,404		26.5%
1920	1,979		41.0%
1930	2,915		47.3%
1940	3,135		7.5%
1950	4,248		35.5%
1960	8,520		100.6%
1970	11,950		40.3%
1980	11,921		−0.2%
1990	12,376		3.8%
2000	11,929		−3.6%
2010	11,460		−3.9%
2020	12,364		7.9%
2023 (est.)	12,574		1.7%
U.S. Decennial Census; 2020 Census

=== 2020 census ===
As of the 2020 census, North St. Paul had a population of 12,364. The median age was 37.7 years. 23.0% of residents were under the age of 18 and 16.6% of residents were 65 years of age or older. For every 100 females there were 96.8 males, and for every 100 females age 18 and over there were 95.0 males age 18 and over.

100.0% of residents lived in urban areas, while 0.0% lived in rural areas.

There were 4,803 households in North St. Paul, of which 30.1% had children under the age of 18 living in them. Of all households, 43.9% were married-couple households, 19.1% were households with a male householder and no spouse or partner present, and 28.1% were households with a female householder and no spouse or partner present. About 29.1% of all households were made up of individuals and 11.9% had someone living alone who was 65 years of age or older.

There were 4,984 housing units, of which 3.6% were vacant. The homeowner vacancy rate was 1.2% and the rental vacancy rate was 4.6%.

Racial composition as of the 2020 census
Race	Number	Percent
White	7,922	64.1%
Black or African American	1,196	9.7%
American Indian and Alaska Native	82	0.7%
Asian	1,878	15.2%
Native Hawaiian and Other Pacific Islander	0	0.0%
Some other race	361	2.9%
Two or more races	925	7.5%
Hispanic or Latino (of any race)	781	6.3%

=== 2010 census ===
As of the census of 2010, there were 11,460 people, 4,615 households, and 2,982 families living in the city. The population density was 4,021.1 inhabitants per square mile (1,552.6/km^{2}). There were 4,822 housing units at an average density of 1,691.9 per square mile (653.2/km^{2}). The racial makeup of the city was 81.2% White, 7.0% African American, 0.6% Native American, 6.6% Asian, 0.1% Pacific Islander, 1.6% from other races, and 2.9% from two or more races. Hispanic or Latino of any race were 4.9% of the population.

There were 4,615 households, of which 30.7% had children under the age of 18 living with them, 46.7% were married couples living together, 12.9% had a female householder with no husband present, 5.0% had a male householder with no wife present, and 35.4% were non-families. Of all households 28.2% were made up of individuals, and 10% had someone living alone who was 65 years of age or older. The average household size was 2.47 and the average family size was 3.04.

The median age in the city was 38.5 years. Of residents 22.7% were under the age of 18; 9.9% were between the ages of 18 and 24; 25.3% were from 25 to 44; 29% were from 45 to 64; and 13.1% were 65 years of age or older. The gender makeup of the city was 49.1% male and 50.9% female.

=== 2000 census ===
As of the census of 2000, there were 11,929 people, 4,703 households, and 3,160 families living in the city. The population density was 4,132.4 inhabitants per square mile (1,595.5/km^{2}). There were 4,753 housing units at an average density of 1,646.5 per square mile (635.7/km^{2}). The racial makeup of the city was 92.86% White, 2.62% African American, 0.55% Native American, 1.68% Asian, 0.03% Pacific Islander, 0.86% from other races, and 1.39% from two or more races. Hispanic or Latino of any race were 2.36% of the population.

There were 4,703 households, out of which 33.3% had children under the age of 18 living with them, 51.6% were married couples living together, 11.5% had a female householder with no husband present, and 32.8% were non-families. Of all households 27.0% were made up of individuals, and 9.9% had someone living alone who was 65 years of age or older. The average household size was 2.52 and the average family size was 3.09.

In the city, the population was spread out, with 26.3% under the age of 18, 8.8% from 18 to 24, 30.6% from 25 to 44, 22.7% from 45 to 64, and 11.7% who were 65 years of age or older. The median age was 36 years. For every 100 females, there were 97.0 males. For every 100 females age 18 and over, there were 91.9 males.

The median income for a household in the city was $50,923, and the median income for a family was $59,652. Males had a median income of $38,958 versus $29,757 for females. The per capita income for the city was $22,411. About 2.2% of families and 4.2% of the population were below the poverty line, including 4.1% of those under age 18 and 3.7% of those age 65 or over.

== Religion ==
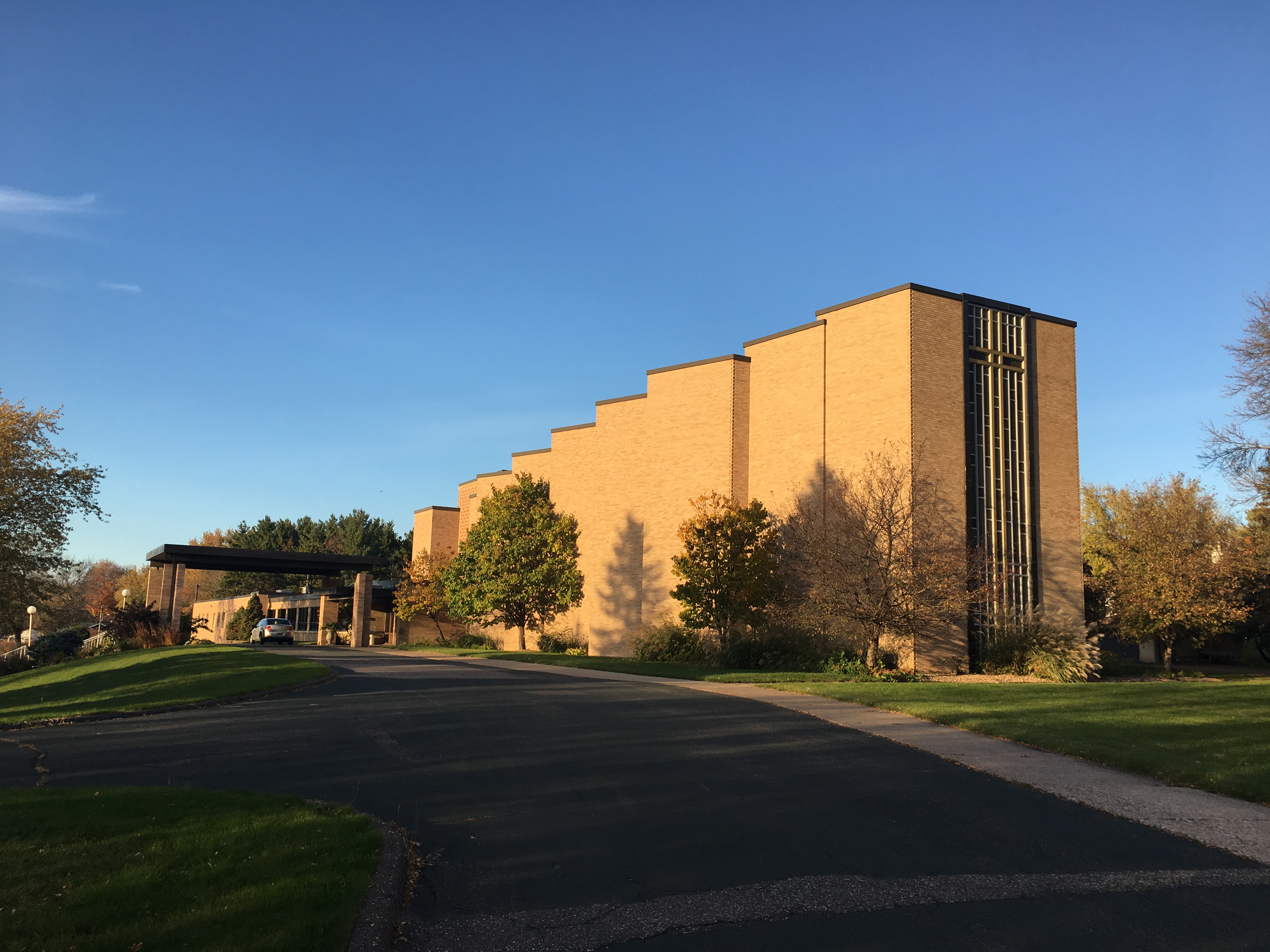
Christ Lutheran Church

Christ Lutheran Church is a member of the Wisconsin Evangelical Lutheran Synod (WELS) in North St. Paul.

North Church is a Presbyterian congregation in North St. Paul.

St Mark's Lutheran Church was founded in 1887. It is part of the Evangelical Lutheran Church in America (ELCA).

Church of St Peter is a Catholic church and parochial school located on Margaret St, just north of Historic Downtown North St Paul.

- The Church of St. Peter was incorporated on January 8, 1889 and purchased a building previously used by the Congregational Church on Margaret St.
- Corner stone for the historic church was laid in September 1915.
- The community moved into the historic church in 1916 and spent the next decade decorating the church with stained glass windows, pews, pipe organ and Italian marble altars
- The parish broke ground for O'Reilley Hall on Sunday, May 16, 1971. This temporary space continues to serve various needs for the community.
- The parish added Fellowship Hall and the Adoration Chapel in the 1990s.
- Construction of the current church began in 2007
- The Church of St . Peter and Holy Redeemer Parish merged in 2008.
- The current church was consecrated by Archbishop John Neinstedt on September 7, 2008

The Catholic community in North St. Paul began in 1888 as a mission parish of Guardian Angels parish. Throughout the early years the parish occupied a series of buildings until 1915 when the parishioners built the brick church. The older building was remodeled into the town’s first parochial school. Members of the Sisters of St. Joseph staffed the school until 1928, at which time several things began to change. The Sisters of St. Francis from Rochester were hired to teach in the school. A new school and convent were also built. The school had eight classrooms, a library, and a nurse’s room.

== Education ==
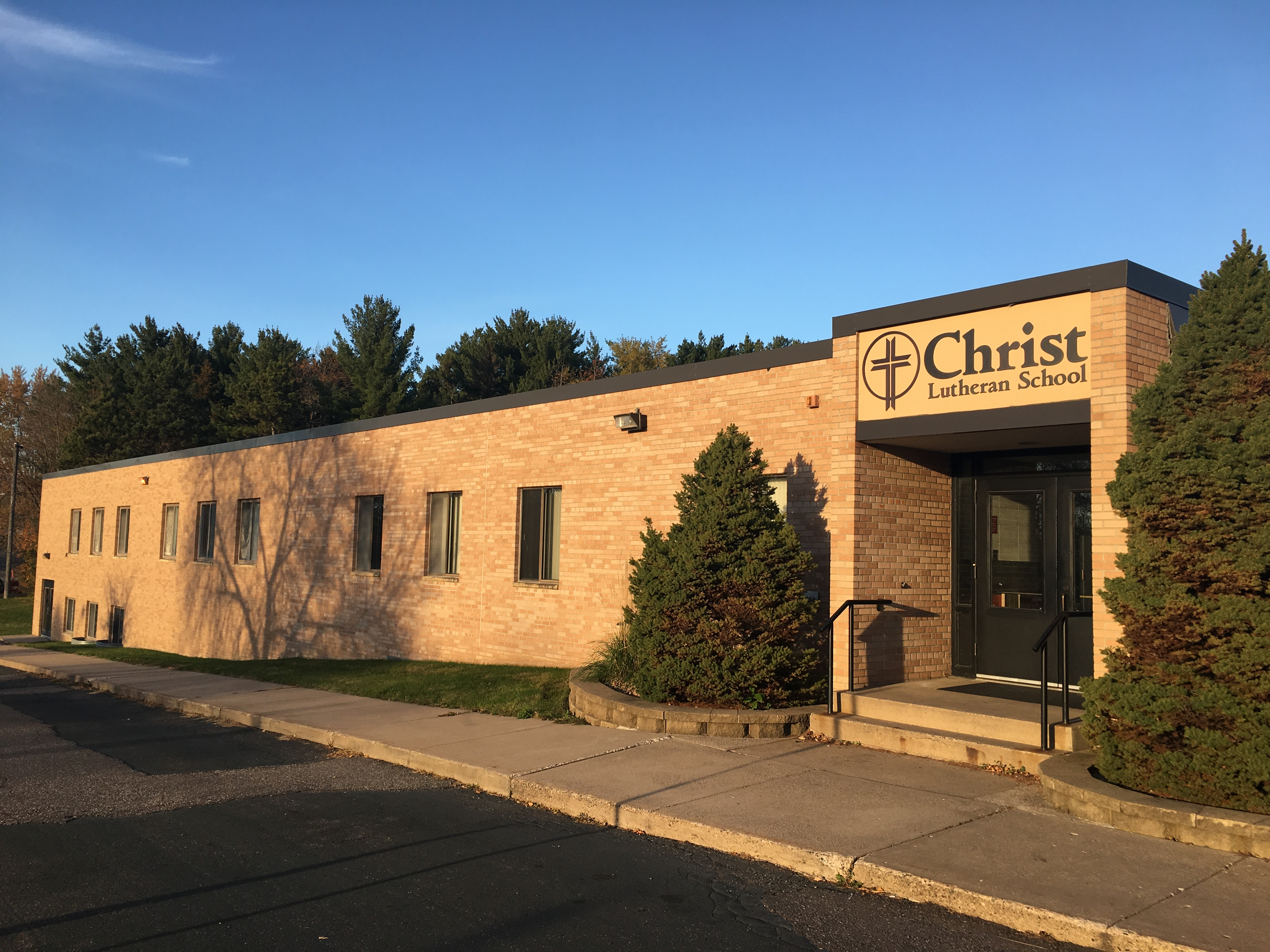
Christ Lutheran School

Public

- North High School
- Cowern Elementary School
- Richardson Elementary School
- L.C. Webster Elementary School

Private

- Christ Lutheran School
- St. Peter Catholic School

== Transportation ==
Minnesota Highway 36 and the Gateway State Trail, running over the former Soo Line Railway grade, bisect the city of North Saint Paul.

Highway 36 serves as a main route in the city; it is a four-lane highway with both at-grade and overpass intersections. Additionally, Interstate Highway 694 is in close proximity to the city.
