= Cannon City, Minnesota =

Cannon City
- Unincorporated community
- Location within Minnesota Location within the United States
- Coordinates: 44°19′45″N 93°12′41″W
- Country: United States
- State: Minnesota
- County: Rice County
- Township: Cannon City Township
- Elevation: 1,204 ft (367 m)

Population
  - Total: 110
- Time zone: UTC-6 (Central (CST))
  - Summer (DST): UTC-5 (CDT)
- ZIP code: 55021
- Area code: 507
- GNIS feature ID: 640869

Cannon City is an unincorporated community in Cannon City Township, Rice County, Minnesota, United States, five miles northeast of Faribault.

The community is located at the junction of Rice County Road 20 (Cannon City Boulevard) and Crystal Lake Trail.

Cannon City was platted in 1855, and named after the nearby Cannon River.

The community of Cannon City was the model for Metropolisville in the novel The Mystery of Metropolisville by Edward Eggleston.
