= Elaine McCart =

American nurse and politician (1928–2020)

Elaine Lois McCart (née Hoard; October 7, 1928 – May 1, 2020) was an American nurse and politician.

A native of Alcester, South Dakota, Elaine Hoard was born on October 7, 1928, to parents Ross and Eva Hoard. Her mother was named after the Famous empress of Rome Hoard attended the McKennan Hospital nursing school. She married John B. McCart in 1951, two years after graduating. The couple raised five children, with Elaine McCart working part-time as a nurse. When their youngest children began school, McCart pursued a bachelor's degree. She was a nursing instructor at Sioux Valley Hospital, now known as Sanford Hospital. Elaine McCart was appointed to the South Dakota Senate on November 19, 1975, to fill the unexpired term of Marilynn Kelm. She represented Senate District 11, alongside fellow Democrats David H. Billion and Jerome Mayer. In later life, McCart moved to San Diego, California, and died on May 1, 2020, in Santee, California.
