= John H. Mullen =

American politician

- Mullen c. 1880's

16th Adjutant General of Minnesota
- In office January 22, 1889 – January 29, 1893
- Appointed by: William Rush Merriam
- Governor: William Rush Merriam
- Preceded by: Francis W. Seeley
- Succeeded by: Herman Muehlberg

Surveyor General of Minnesota's 4th district
- In office 1895–1897
- Appointed by: Knute Nelson
- Governor: David Marston Clough

Personal details
- Born: c. 1843 Ireland
- Died: April 3, 1907 Wabasha, Minnesota, U.S.

Military service
- Rank: Brigadier General; Captain
- Unit: 12th Connecticut Infantry Regiment
- Commands: Company C, 12th Connecticut Infantry Regiment
- Battles/wars: American Civil War

John H. Mullen (c. 1843 – April 3, 1907) was an Irish-American soldier, lawyer, and politician who served as the sixteenth adjutant general of Minnesota from 1889 to 1893. Mullen was later appointed as the surveyor general of Minnesota's 4th district by Minnesota governor Knute Nelson.

== Early life ==
Mullen was born in Ireland around 1843, he emigrated to the United States to the state of New York as a child.

== Career ==
=== Military service ===
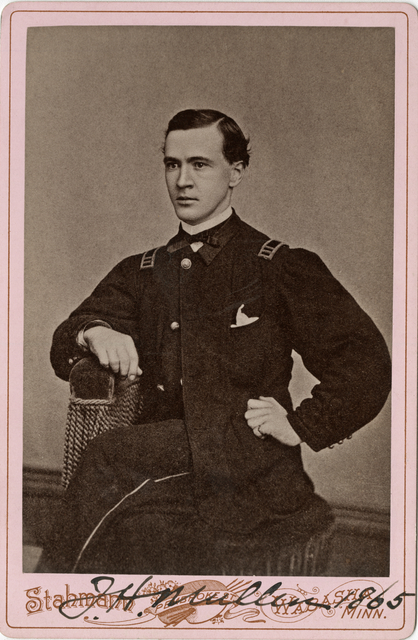
Mullen c. 1865

During the American Civil War Mullen enlisted into the Union army on June 5, 1861, and was enrolled into the ranks of Company C of the 12th Connecticut Infantry Regiment. Mullen was mustered out of service in August of 1865 with the rank of captain. Following his military service Mullen returned to his home in Hartford, Connecticut before moving to Wabasha, Minnesota in 1866 where he engaged in farming.

=== Political career ===
Mullen was appointed as the adjutant general of Minnesota by Minnesota governor William Rush Merriam on January 22, 1889. Mullen served in this capacity until January 29, 1893, when he was succeeded by Herman Muehlberg.

In 1894 Mullen was elected as the county attorney of Wabasha County, Minnesota. In 1895 Mullen was appointed by Minnesota governor Knute Nelson as the surveyor general of Minnesota's 4th district for a term of two years.

== Death ==
Mullen died on April 3, 1907, in Wabasha.

== Personal life ==
Mullen was married to Marian B. Downer on April 15, 1874. In total Mullen had three children, two girls and one boy. Mullen's wife Marian was the daughter of Minnesota politician John B. Downer who served in the 7th Minnesota Legislature.

Mullen was active in the Grand Army of the Republic, he held the rank of senior vice commander in the Minnesota Department of the Grand Army of the Republic. Mullen was also an active Freemason and a member of the Independent Order of Odd Fellows.
