= Cannon City Township, Rice County, Minnesota =

Cannon City Township, Minnesota
- Township
- Location within the state of Minnesota Cannon City Township, Minnesota (the United States)
- Coordinates: 44°19′13″N 93°13′52″W
- Country: United States
- State: Minnesota
- County: Rice

Area
  - Total: 30.8 sq mi (79.8 km^{2})
  - Land: 30.7 sq mi (79.4 km^{2})
  - Water: 0.19 sq mi (0.5 km^{2})
- Elevation: 1,132 ft (345 m)

Population (2000)
  - Total: 1,212
  - Density: 40/sq mi (15.3/km^{2})
- Time zone: UTC-6 (Central (CST))
  - Summer (DST): UTC-5 (CDT)
- FIPS code: 27-09712
- GNIS feature ID: 0663742

Cannon City Township is a township in Rice County, Minnesota, United States. The population was 1,212 at the 2000 census.

The small, unincorporated community of Cannon City is located within the township. The unincorporated community of Prairieville is partially located within the township at the southeast corner.

== Geography ==
According to the United States Census Bureau, the township has a total area of 30.8 square miles (80 km^{2}), of which 30.6 square miles (79 km^{2}) is land and 0.2 square miles (0.52 km^{2}) (0.55%) is water.

== History ==
Settled in the 1850s, Cannon City Township was named after the Cannon River.

== Demographics ==
As of the census of 2000, there were 1,212 people, 419 households, and 333 families residing in the township. The population density was 39.5 inhabitants per square mile (15.3/km^{2}). There were 429 housing units at an average density of 14.0 per square mile (5.4/km^{2}). The racial makeup of the township was 98.76% White, 0.17% Asian, 0.08% Pacific Islander, 0.58% from other races, and 0.41% from two or more races. Hispanic or Latino of any race were 1.32% of the population.

There were 419 households, out of which 40.8% had children under the age of 18 living with them, 70.6% were married couples living together, 4.5% had a female householder with no husband present, and 20.3% were non-families. 16.5% of all households were made up of individuals, and 6.0% had someone living alone who was 65 years of age or older. The average household size was 2.88 and the average family size was 3.23.

In the township the population was spread out, with 30.4% under the age of 18, 6.6% from 18 to 24, 30.4% from 25 to 44, 22.6% from 45 to 64, and 10.1% who were 65 years of age or older. The median age was 36 years. For every 100 females, there were 102.7 males. For every 100 females age 18 and over, there were 104.9 males.

The median income for a household in the township was $55,682, and the median income for a family was $60,179. Males had a median income of $36,544 versus $28,654 for females. The per capita income for the township was $20,756. About 3.7% of families and 3.3% of the population were below the poverty line, including 1.9% of those under age 18 and 2.7% of those age 65 or over.
