= Oakland Cemetery (St. Paul, Minnesota) =

Historic cemetery in St. Paul, Minnesota

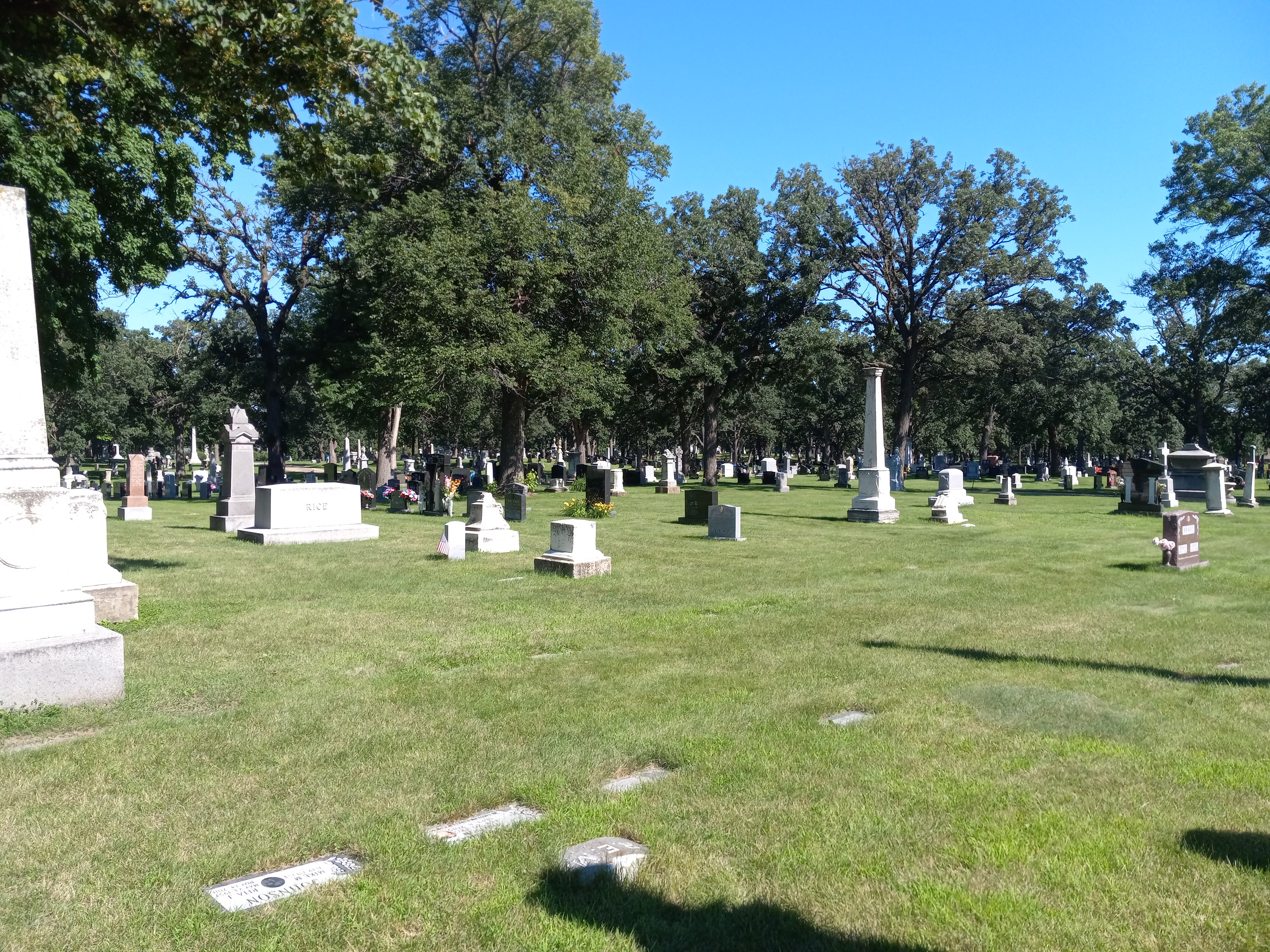
- Graves in Oakland Cemetery
- Interactive map of Oakland Cemetery

Details
- Established: June 24, 1853
- Location: Saint Paul, Minnesota
- Country: United States
- Coordinates: 44°58′10.488″N 93°5′56.4″W
- Type: City
- Owned by: Ramsey County
- Size: 100 acres
- No. of graves: 52,982
- Find a Grave: Oakland Cemetery

Oakland Cemetery (founded June 24, 1853) is a historic cemetery in the center of Saint Paul, Minnesota in the United States. At 100 acres (0.404 km^{2}), it is one of the largest cemeteries in the Minneapolis–Saint Paul metropolitan area behind Fort Snelling National Cemetery and Calvary Cemetery. According to MNopedia Oakland is Minnesota's oldest public cemetery.

== History ==
In 1850 St. Paul Pioneer Press owner James M. Goodhue pushed for the creation of a public cemetery in Saint Paul, at the time the capital city of Minnesota. The city had few cemeteries or graveyards for its local citizens. The city also had few cemeteries for different sects of Christianity, non-religious people, paupers, and visitors to be buried.

Oakland cemetery was founded on June 24, 1853 as a non-denominational city cemetery in Saint Paul, Minnesota. The location of Oakland Cemetery was sited upon 40 acres of densely wooded land and rolling hills two miles north of the Mississippi River. The cemetery was slowly developed as more land was accrued over the subsequent 20 years. By 1873 landscape architect Horace Cleveland continued Oakland cemetery's park-like appearance. Cleveland was a resident of the Twin Cities at the time and had also designed St. Anthony Park, Phalen Park, and the Como Park Zoo and Conservatory.

Oakland's first chapel was built in 1882, meanwhile the groundskeeper's residence was built two years later in 1885. The chapel at Oakland was later replaced around 1924 with a new chapel. A mausoleum styled in neoclassical form was erected in the southeast corner of Oakland. In 1905 Oakland absorbed the adjacent German Lutheran Zion Cemetery, bringing Oakland to roughly 100 acres of burial grounds. In 1911 a storage building for graveyard equipment and a greenhouse were installed. The greenhouse itself provided flowers for the cemetery lots via the Oakland Cemetery Association. Today the cemetery remains heavily wooded with Oak and Elm trees.

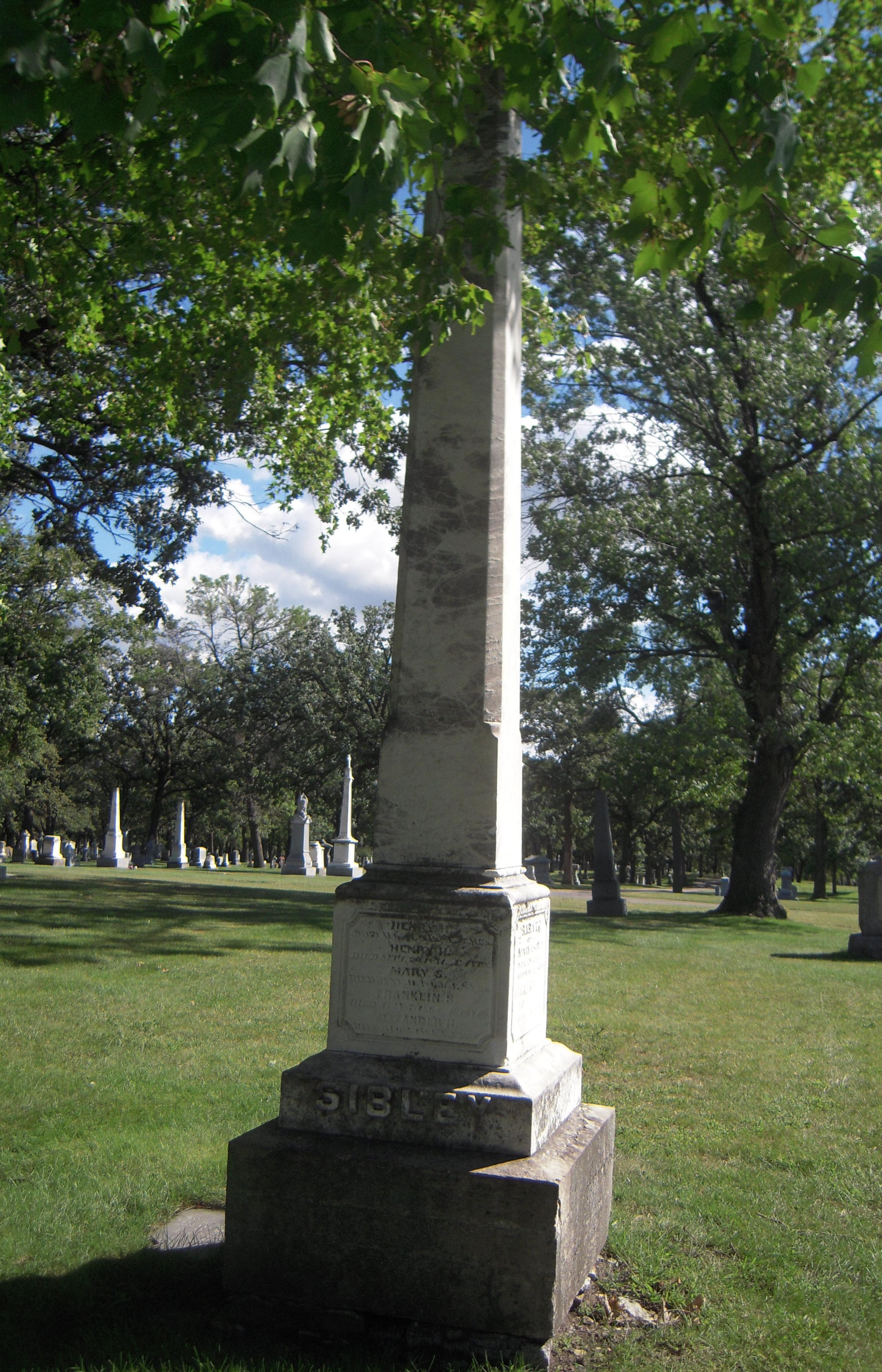
The Hastings family grave column in Oakland Cemetery, St. Paul, Minnesota; includes the grave of Henry Hastings Sibley

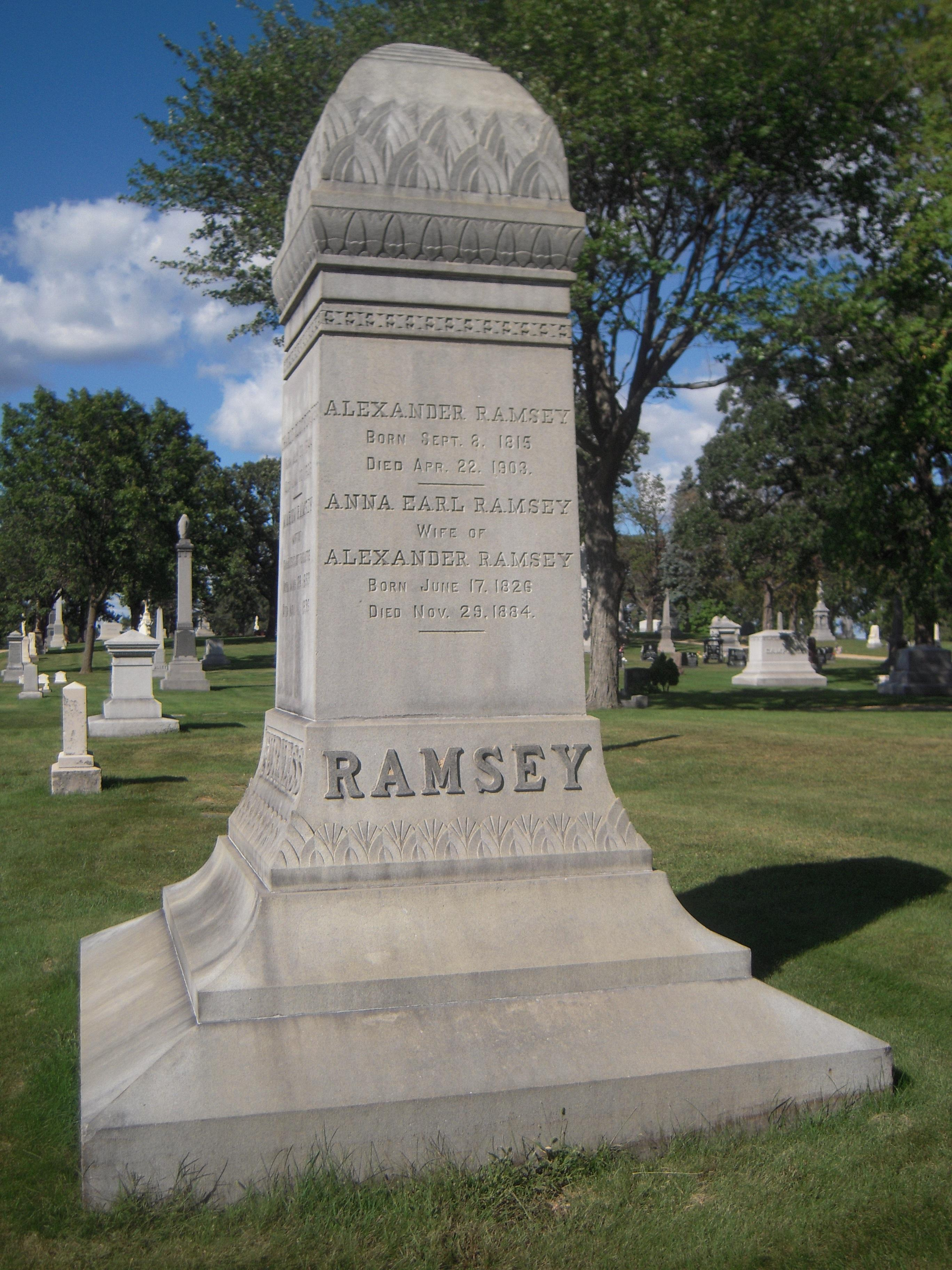
The grave column of the Alexander Ramsey family in Oakland Cemetery, St. Paul, Minnesota

Many of Minnesota and Saint Paul's founding citizens are buried at Oakland including governors Henry Hastings Sibley and Alexander Ramsey; settler Augustus Larpenteur; educator Harriet Bishop; philanthropist Amherst Wilder; and the merchant families of William Schurmeier, Charles Foote, and William Lindeke.

== Monuments and memorials ==
=== Soldiers Rest ===
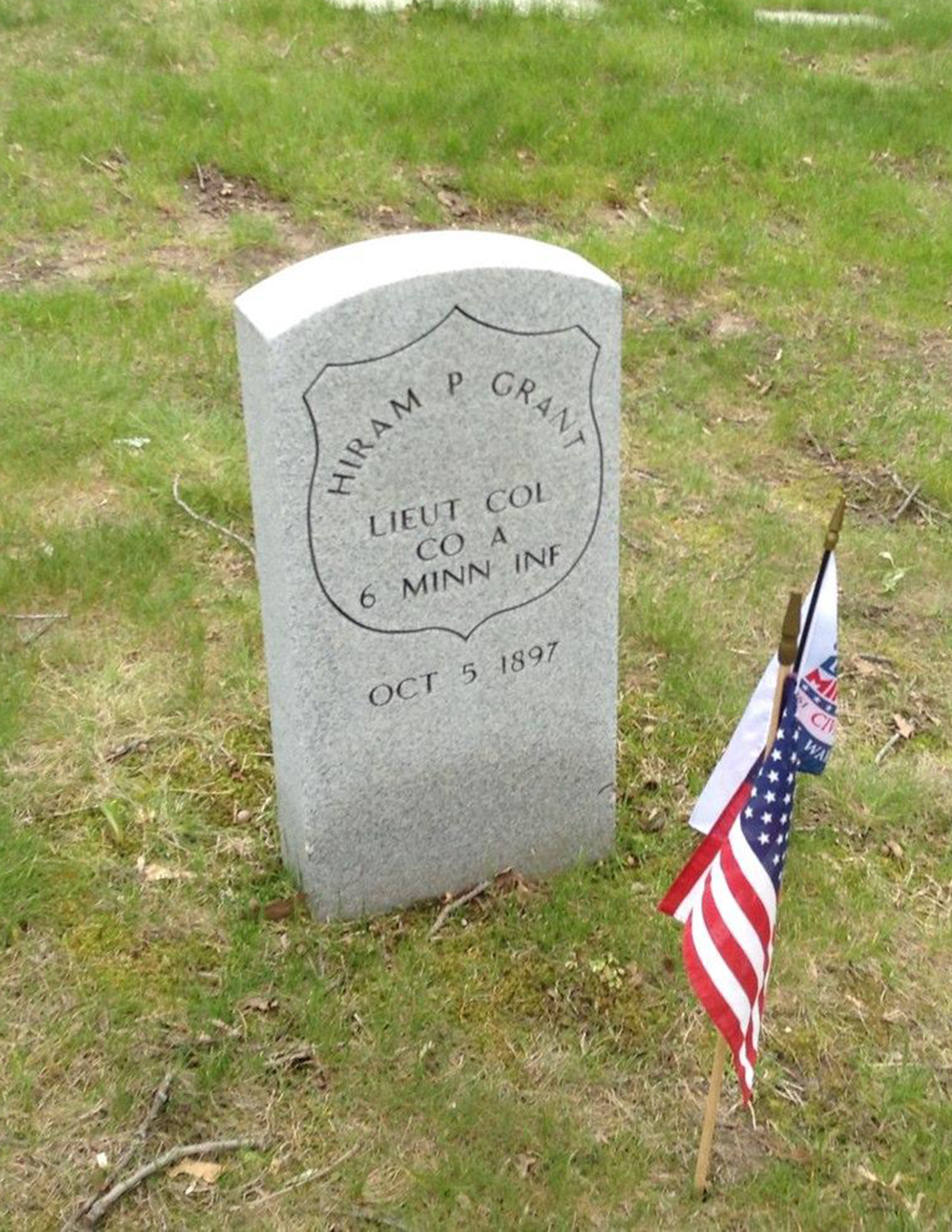
The headstone of Lieutenant Colonel Hiram P. Grant, one of the commanders of the 6th Minnesota Infantry Regiment at the Battle of Birch Coulee

"Soldiers Rest" is one of the largest sections of the cemetery. There are approximately 1,500 - 2,000 veteran soldiers buried in Oakland from a multitude of regiments, primarily soldiers who served in Minnesota civil war regiments. According to the Ramsey County Historical Society Soldiers Rest was created in response to a request from the local Acker Post #21 of the Grand Army of the Republic (GAR), to donate ground for soldiers' graves. Oakland had responded by setting aside parcels of land dedicated to the free burial of honorably discharged soldiers who served in the American Civil War. In the late 1870's the Quartermaster General of the United States Army requested information from Oakland cemetery on soldiers who had died in service of the United States who were also buried at the cemetery. This was quickly followed-up in 1879 with a notice that all veterans or militiamen of any war service or conflict would be given headstones in the Oakland cemetery. One notable soldier buried at Soldiers Rest is Private John Franklin "Frank" Donley (1836–1857). Donley served in Captain James Starkey's St. Paul Light Cavalry militia, Donley was killed in action fighting against the Ojibwe near the Sunrise River during the summer of 1857. According to the book Encyclopedia of Biography of Minnesota: History of Minnesota by Charles Eugene Flandrau, Donley is noted by Flandrau as being the first militiaman from the state of Minnesota who was killed in action.

=== I.O.O.F. ===
A section of Oakland is dedicated to the Independent Order of Odd Fellows, as well as various fraternal orders and friendly societies including the Freemasons, the Knights of Pythias, and the Ancient Order of United Workmen among many others.

=== St. Paul Fireman's Association ===
In 1868 the Firemen's Association of Saint Paul purchased a large plot of land in the cemetery for the burial of firefighter members who were killed while fighting fires. Later in 1890, the Board of Fire Commissioners appointed a committee to erect a bronze memorial statue which would be dedicated to Saint Paul firemen at the nearby Catholic Calvary Cemetery. Calvary declined the offer and the memorial was instead placed at Oakland cemetery.

=== The Ramsey County poor ===
To accentuate the "public" aspect as a public cemetery, many poorer families and people of Ramsey County, Minnesota were allowed to be buried in certain sections of Oakland, often called potter's field or pauper's graves at the time. The city of Saint Paul originally purchased a plot of land at Oakland for $240. However, the need for poorer families to afford graves was much higher than what the city had originally anticipated. The Board of Ramsey County Commissioners later purchase one acre of land in Oakland for $300 which would be designated as the "County Acre" and used for poorer citizens.

== Notable burials ==
- Henry Hastings Sibley: First U.S. Congressional representative for Minnesota Territory, the first governor of the state of Minnesota, and a U.S. military leader during the Dakota War of 1862.
- James M. Goodhue: American journalist and newspaper editor. Founder of the St. Paul Pioneer Press.
- Mary Colter: Architect and interior designer.
- John L. Merriam: American businessman and politician.
- James T. Maxfield: 16th and 19th Mayor of Saint Paul.
- Archibald Bush: American businessman and co-founder of 3M.
- Arthur Gillette: American orthopedic and pediatric surgeo, founder of the Gillette Children's Hospital.
- Lucius Pond Ordway: American businessman and investor in 3M.
- Andrew Myrick: Fur trader and one of the figures behind the start of the Dakota War of 1862.
- Charles Eugene Flandrau: Justice of the first Minnesota Supreme Court, militia commander during the Battles of New Ulm.
- Herb Joesting: American football player and coach.
- Joel Emmons Whitney: Artist and early photographer of St. Paul.
- Harriet Bishop: Established the first secular school in the Minnesota Territory in St. Paul in 1847.
- Norman Kittson: Manager of the American Fur Company in northern Minnesota, a member of the Minnesota Territorial Legislature from 1851 to 1855, and Mayor of St. Paul in 1858.
- Edward Duffield Neill: Minnesota author and educator.
- Joseph Burger: Medal of Honor recipient for heroism during combat at Nolensville, Tennessee on February 15, 1863.
- Edmund Brooke Alexander: Officer in the United States Army in the Mexican-American War through the American Civil War who rose to the rank of brevet Brigadier General in 1865.
- Arthur E. Nelson: Lawyer and politician who served briefly as a U.S. Senator from Minnesota during the end of 1942 and beginning of 1943.
- Albert W. McMillan: One of 20 other Medal of Honor Recipients during the Wounded Knee Massacre.
- Christopher Columbus Andrews: Brigadier General and commander of the 3rd Minnesota Infantry Regiment during the American Civil War.
- Edwin Aaron Clark Hatch: Notable Indian agent, fur trader, and the commander of Hatch's Minnesota Cavalry Battalion.
- Samuel J. R. McMillan: American lawyer, judge and Republican politician. He served on the Minnesota District Court, the Minnesota Supreme Court and as U.S. Senator from Minnesota.
- Horace Austin: Served as the sixth governor of Minnesota from January 9, 1870, to January 7, 1874. Austin was also a Civil War veteran who served in the 1st Minnesota Cavalry Regiment.
- Judson Wade Bishop: Brigadier General during the American Civil War and commander of the 2nd Minnesota Infantry Regiment.
- Samuel Mayall: United States representative from Maine.
- Andrew Kiefer: was a U.S. representative from Minnesota, politician, and American Civil War veteran.
- Richard W. Johnson: Union Army during the American Civil War.
- Hiram P. Grant: Lieutenant Colonel of the 6th Minnesota Infantry Regiment, tribunal member for the 1862 Mankato Hangings.
- Cushman K. Davis: Republican politician who served as the seventh governor of Minnesota and as a U.S. senator from Minnesota. Davis also served in the American Civil War in the 28th Wisconsin Infantry Regiment.
- Willis A. Gorman: American lawyer, soldier, politician, served as 2nd Territorial Governor of Minnesota.
- Robert Neil MacLaren: Minnesota politician, United States Marshal, and Brigadier General during the American Civil War, the Dakota War of 1862, and Sibley's 1863 Campaign.
- William Rainey Marshall: fifth Governor of Minnesota and American Civil War veteran of the 7th Minnesota Infantry Regiment.
- Andrew Ryan McGill: tenth governor of Minnesota from January 5, 1887, to January 9, 1889. Civil War veteran in the 9th Minnesota Infantry Regiment.
- Eleazer A. Paine: American lawyer, author and a Union officer during the American Civil War from Ohio.
- Alexander Ramsey: American politician, 5th Mayor of Saint Paul, and the first Minnesota Territorial Governor. He later became a U.S. Senator.
- Edmund Rice: Military officer and politician who served in the U.S. Congress in Minnesota's 4th District from March 4, 1887, to March 3, 1889.
- Henry M. Rice: fur trader and an American politician prominent in the statehood of Minnesota.
- John B. Sanborn: served as a General in the Union Army during the American Civil War. He was also a key member of the reconstruction era Congressional-appointed Indian Peace Commission.
- Marshall Sherman: Medal of Honor recipient for actions for seizing the 28th Virginia battle flag on July 3, 1863, during the Battle of Gettysburg.
- Jacob H. Stewart: American Civil War veteran and Representative for the U.S. state of Minnesota.
- Frederick Stevens: politician who served as a U.S. representative from Minnesota from 1897 to 1915.
- James H. Simpson: U.S. Army and a member of the United States Corps of Topographical Engineers.
- Samuel D. Phillips: Medal of Honor recipient in the United States Army during the Battle of Little Muddy Creek in Montana Territory on May 7, 1877.
- James Allen: Recipient of the Medal of Honor for gallantry in action at the Battle of South Mountain on September 14, 1862.
- Azariah Pierson: Notable Indian agent and Freemason.
- Henry Acker: Michigan politician.
- William Henry Acker: Fifth Adjutant General of Minnesota.
