= Lucius W. Nieman =

American businessman (1857–1935)

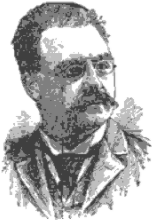
- Born: Lucius William Nieman; December 13, 1857; Sauk County, Wisconsin
- Died: October 1, 1935 (aged 77); Milwaukee, Wisconsin
- Known for: Founder of The Milwaukee Journal
- Spouse: Agnes Wahl Nieman

Lucius William Nieman (December 13, 1857 – October 1, 1935) was an American businessman and founder of The Milwaukee Journal.

== Biography ==
Born at Bear Valley in Sauk County, Wisconsin, Lucius's father was Conrad Nieman; and Sara Elizabeth Delamater was his mother. He had an older sister Violette.

Lucius was two years of age when his father died. His mother took him home to her parents: H. H. and Susan Cuppernall in Mukwonago. A local schoolteacher boarded at their home, and Lucius benefited from the adult company.

Theron Haight, editor of The Waukesha Freeman, gave Lucius his start in the publishing industry. At age 12 he was set to menial tasks, and eventually learned to set type. This skill brought him to the composing room of The Milwaukee Sentinel in 1871. Ambitious to become a journalist, Lucius returned to his grandmother Delamater and study at Carroll College in Waukesha.

In fact, he became the Waukesha correspondent for The Milwaukee Sentinel. The paper continued to employ Lucius, next as a reporter for Milwaukee, then in 1875 as correspondent in Madison covering government business in the state capital. He became managing editor in 1876.

In 1880 Nieman went to Saint Paul, Minnesota as managing editor of the Saint Paul Dispatch. Though successful in boosting circulation and advertising, Nieman left Minnesota and returned to Wisconsin. There Peter V. Deuster was running for re-election to Congress and publishing The Daily Journal to promote his campaign. Nieman acquired half interest in the paper on December 11, 1882. Deuster returned to Washington and Nieman became editor in chief and had editorial independence. The name was changed to The Milwaukee Journal, and from modest beginnings the paper grew to challenge The Sentinel for dominance in Milwaukee.

Nieman intended to provide a "channel for the expression of views not dictated by 'bossism' or corrupted by 'machine' politics." The paper advocated "regulation of public utilities, conservation of the state’s natural resources, reforestation, development of the state’s water-power resources, and a better highway program."

In 1895 Nieman responded to a plea to help the less fortunate. "It might be a downright good thing to have the women run the Journal for a day", he said. On February 22 men were replaced in the editorial and business offices by female reporters and managers.

Agnes Elizabeth Gunter Wahl became Mrs. Nieman on November 29, 1900. Her father Christian Wahl is known as "the father of Milwaukee’s public park system".

Lucius W. Nieman died in Milwaukee on October 1, 1935.

== Legacy ==
When Nieman died, his 55% interest in the Milwaukee Journal was valued at $3,850,000. He directed in his will that equal shares of stock sale proceeds go to his widow and to his niece, Faye McBeath, a Journal employee and assistant to Nieman. The Nieman Foundation for Journalism was established after his widow, Agnes Wahl Nieman, left Harvard University $1 million in her will in 1937.

Nieman Fellowships for study at Harvard are awarded to experienced news reporters. James Bryant Conant was President of Harvard when the bequest was made. Mrs. Nieman had stipulated that funds were to be used to raise standards of journalism. The fellowship program for proven reporters was established by Conant after some consultations.

The Niemanlab covers the Nieman Foundation, Nieman Reports, and Nieman Storyboard. Accountability journalism was backed by the Nieman Watchdog. Accountability continues to be pursued in Nieman Reports.

At Marquette University in Milwaukee, the Department of Journalism and Media Studies has named a lead faculty position the Lucius W. Nieman Chair of Journalism.
