= Herman Muehlberg =

United States Army officer

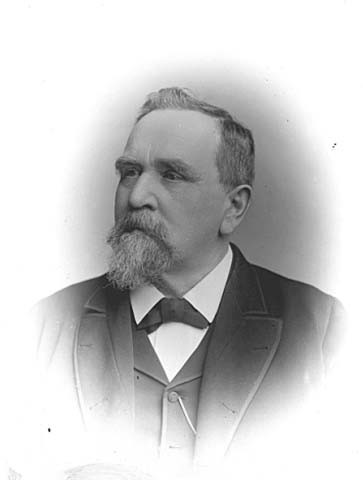

17th Adjutant General of Minnesota
- In office January 29, 1893 – January 16, 1899
- Appointed by: Knute Nelson
- Governor: Knute Nelson; David M. Clough
- Preceded by: John H. Mullen
- Succeeded by: George C. Lambert

Personal details
- Born: May 3, 1833 German Confederation
- Died: March 27, 1911 (aged 77) Carver, Minnesota, U.S.

Military service
- Allegiance: United States of America
- Branch/service: Union army
- Years of service: 1862–1865
- Rank: Brigadier General
- Unit: 5th Minnesota Infantry Regiment
- Battles/wars: American Civil War

Herman Muehlberg (May 3, 1833 – March 27, 1911), also spelled as Hermann Muehlberg, was an American surveyor, newspaper editor, and military officer who served as the seventeenth adjutant general of Minnesota.

== Early life ==
Muehlberg was born on May 3, 1833, in the German Confederation. Muehlberg emigrated with his family to the United States in 1846 from Hanover. Muehlberg's family originally settled in St. Louis where Muehlberg worked in the printing trade. In 1851 Muehlberg moved to Dubuque, Iowa. Muehlberg eventually moved with his wife to Minnesota Territory in 1856 and settled in Carver, Minnesota.

== Career ==
In 1860 Muehlberg worked as a surveyor and teacher. During the American Civil War Muehlberg enlisted in the Union army on February 19, 1862, and originally served as a sergeant in Company E of the 5th Minnesota Infantry Regiment. Muehlberg was eventually promoted to the rank of sergeant major of the regiment and was later commissioned as the captain of Company D of the 5th Minnesota.

Following his military service Muehlberg purchased the Carver Free Press newspaper in 1881 and worked as the paper's editor. In 1883 Muehlberg was elected as the surveyor of Carver County, he was re-elected in 1888 as county surveyor.

Muehlberg was appointed by Knute Nelson as the adjutant general of Minnesota. Muehlberg was preceded as adjutant general by John H. Mullen of Wabasha, Minnesota. Muehlberg served as adjutant general during the Spanish–American War under Minnesota governor David Marston Clough and was responsible for organizing state troops for the war effort.

== Death ==
Muehlberg died on March 27, 1911, in Carver.

== Personal life and family ==
Muehlberg was married to Clara Freese, together they had two sons and three daughters. One of Muehlberg's sons, Herman O. Muehlberg, ran unsuccessfully for a seat in the Minnesota House of Representatives representing Minnesota's 37th House district, he lost to Democrat candidate John F. Boyland. Muehlberg's son Herman also worked as the editor and publisher of the Carver Free Press until 1897.
