= David Vigen =

American minister and politician (1933–2019)

David Clifford Vigen (October 5, 1933 – May 9, 2019) was an American Christian minister and politician.

A native of Fergus Falls, Minnesota, born to parents Clifford Tollef Vigen and Amanda Theodora Thyse on October 5, 1933, Vigen was of Norwegian descent. He earned a degree from St. Olaf College in 1955, married in 1956, graduated from Luther Seminary in 1960, and completed a Master of Sacred Theology degree in 1962. Vigen was a minister to several congregations, in Osage, Armstrong, and Iowa City, Iowa, as well as Oak Park and Wheaton, Illinois, and McGrath, Minnesota. Between 1968 and 1973, Vigen was director of pastoral counseling at Lutheran Social Services in South Dakota. He contested a 1971 election to the state legislature, which he lost by two votes. Upon the resignation of Robert Giebink, Governor Richard Kneip appointed Vigen to the South Dakota House of Representatives. Vigen resigned from the state legislature in 1974 to accept an appointment to the South Dakota Board of Charities and Corrections, and was replaced by John McCart in April of that year. Vigen later returned to Iowa, and died on May 9, 2019.
