= Marilynn Kelm =

American politician

Member of the South Dakota Senate
- In office 1975–1975

Personal details
- Born: December 7, 1937 (age 88)
- Party: Democratic
- Education: North Dakota State University; Augustana College

Marilynn Kelm (born December 7, 1937) is an American politician. She served as a Democratic member of the South Dakota Senate.

== Life and career ==
Kelm attended North Dakota State University and Augustana College.

Kelm served in the South Dakota Senate in 1975.
