= Prairieville, Minnesota =

Prairieville
- Unincorporated community
- Location within Minnesota Location within the United States
- Coordinates: 44°17′02″N 93°11′32″W
- Country: United States
- State: Minnesota
- County: Rice County
- Township: Cannon City Township and Walcott Township
- Elevation: 1,184 ft (361 m)
- Time zone: UTC-6 (Central (CST))
  - Summer (DST): UTC-5 (CDT)
- ZIP code: 55021
- Area code: 507
- GNIS feature ID: 654891

Prairieville is an unincorporated community in Rice County, Minnesota, United States, east of Faribault.

The community is located at the junction of State Highway 60 (MN 60) and Eiler Avenue.

Prairieville is located within Cannon City Township and Walcott Township.
