= 137th Illinois Infantry Regiment =

- Active: June 5–September 4, 1864
- Disbanded: September 4, 1864
- Country: United States
- Allegiance: Union
- Branch: Infantry
- Size: Regiment
- Engagements: American Civil War: Second Battle of Memphis

Commanders
- Colonel: John Wood

The 137th Illinois Infantry Regiment was an infantry regiment from Illinois that served in the Union Army between June 5 and September 4, 1864, during the American Civil War.

== Service ==
The regiment was organized at Camp Wood, Quincy, Illinois, by Colonel John Wood, and mustered in for one-hundred day service on June 5. On June 9, the regiment was ordered to Memphis, Tennessee and on July 9, assigned to picket duty on the Hernando road, until September. On August 21, the regiment was involved in the Second Battle of Memphis repelling General Nathan Bedford Forrest's attack. The regiment was mustered out on September 4, 1864, at Springfield, Illinois. During its service the regiment had a total of thirty-four fatalities. (Note: According to Frederick H. Dyers' (1959) A Compendium of the War of the Rebellion Compendium set, the regiment had a total of fifty fatalities.)

== See also ==
- List of Illinois Civil War units

== Bibliography ==
- Dyer, Frederick H. (1959). A Compendium of the War of the Rebellion. New York and London. Thomas Yoseloff, Publisher. LCCN 59-12963.
- Reece. Brigadier General J.N. (1900). The Report of Illinois from Military and Naval Department of the Adjutant General of the State of Illinois. Containing Reports for the Years 1861–1866. Springfield, Illinois. Journal Company, Printers and Binders.
