= Adjutant General of Minnesota =

State agency in Minnesota, United States

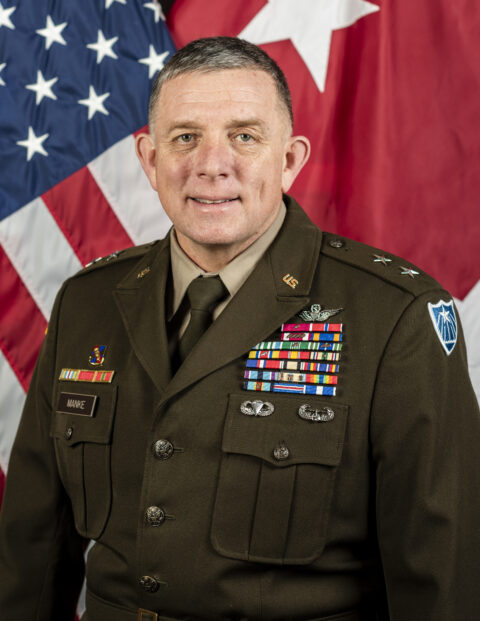
- Incumbent; Major General Shawn P. Manke since August 20, 2020; 6 years, 2 months and 16 days
- Term length: 7 years

The Adjutant General of Minnesota is the commander of the Minnesota National Guard which includes the Minnesota Army National Guard, the Minnesota Air National Guard, and, when active, the Minnesota State Guard and Minnesota Naval Militia. The Adjutant General (or 'TAG') is responsible for all state non-federalized military and state defense forces, and reports directly to the Governor of Minnesota. Minnesota's TAG is appointed by the governor and currently serves a single term of seven years.

== Appointment ==
According to Minnesota Statute §190.07, the Adjutant General must at the minimum hold the rank of Colonel (O-6) or higher with no less than 10 years of service. The Adjutant General must be appointed by the Governor of Minnesota within 120 days of a vacancy of the position. The statute also states that the Adjutant General "shall be promoted, if necessary, directly to and shall hold the rank of major general. If not already a major general, the adjutant general's promotion is effective beginning on the date the governor appoints the adjutant general. At the time of appointment and in accordance with the authorities governing federal recognition of officers, the adjutant general is authorized to wear the rank of major general".

There have been 31 people who have served as Adjutant General of Minnesota, one of whom, Horatio P. Van Cleve, served two nonconsecutive terms. The longest-serving Adjutant General of Minnesota was Major General Ellard A. Walsh of the 34th Infantry Division, who served for a total of 22 years from July 1, 1927, to October 2, 1949.

== List of Adjutants General of Minnesota ==
The following have served as Adjutant General of Minnesota Territory:

No.	Image	Name	From date	Appointed by (Governor)	Served until
1		James McClellan Boal	May 1849	Alexander Ramsey	1852
2		Sylvanus B. Lowry	1852	Alexander Ramsey	1853
3		Isaac Van Etten	May 1853	Willis A. Gorman	May 1858

The following have served as Adjutant General of Minnesota:

No.	Image	Name	From Date	Appointed by (Governor)	Served until
4		Alexander C. Jones	1858	Henry Hastings Sibley	April 13, 1860
5		William Henry Acker	April 13, 1860	Alexander Ramsey	April 24, 1861
6		John B. Sanborn	April 24, 1861	Alexander Ramsey	December 31, 1861
7		Oscar Malmros	December 31, 1861	Alexander Ramsey	May 15, 1865
8		John Peller	May 15, 1865	Stephen Miller	January 22, 1866
9		Horatio P. Van Cleve	January 22, 1866	William Rainey Marshall	March 4, 1870
10		Mark Delos Flower	March 4, 1870	Horace Austin	November 1, 1875
11		Henry A. Castle	November 1, 1875	Cushman Kellogg Davis	March 1, 1876
12		Horatio P. Van Cleve	March 1, 1876	John S. Pillsbury	June 1, 1882
13		Alfred Clark Hawley	June 1, 1882	Lucius Frederick Hubbard	January 7, 1884
14		Charles M. McCarthy	January 7, 1884	Lucius Frederick Hubbard	January 8, 1887
15		Francis W. Seeley	January 8, 1887	Andrew Ryan McGill	January 22, 1889
16		John H. Mullen	January 22, 1889	William Rush Merriam	January 29, 1893
17		Herman Muehlberg	January 29, 1893	Knute Nelson	January 16, 1899
18		George C. Lambert	January 17, 1899	John Lind	January 27, 1901
19		Elias David Libbey	January 28, 1901	Samuel Rinnah Van Sant	January 27, 1905
20		Fred B. Wood	January 28, 1905	John Albert Johnson	August 31, 1917
21		Walter Fred Rhinow	1917	Joseph A. A. Burnquist	June 30, 1927
22		Ellard A. Walsh	July 1, 1927	Theodore Christianson	October 2, 1949
23		Joseph C. Nelson	October 2, 1949	Luther Youngdahl	December 30, 1960
24		Chester James Moeglein	1961	Elmer L. Andersen	May 9, 1975
25		James G. Sieben	May 10, 1975	Wendell R. Anderson	April 30, 1988
26		Robert W. Schaumann	May 1, 1988	Rudy Perpich	June 19, 1988
27		Eugene R. Andreotti	June 20, 1988	Rudy Perpich	August 8, 2003
28		Harry A. Sieben	August 9, 2003	Tim Pawlenty	October 31, 2003
29		Larry W. Shellito	November 1, 2003	Tim Pawlenty	October 31, 2010
30		Richard C. Nash	November 1, 2010	Tim Pawlenty	October 31, 2017
31		Jon A. Jensen	November 1, 2017	Mark Dayton	August 10, 2020
32		Shawn P. Manke	August 20, 2020	Tim Walz	Incumbent

== See also ==
- Politics of Minnesota
- Minnesota State Cabinet
- Minnesota Army National Guard
- Minnesota National Guard
- Minnesota Air National Guard
- List of Minnesota National Guard Units
