= John McCart =

American politician (1922–1996)

John B. McCart (1922–1996) was an American politician.

McCart served in the South Dakota House of Representatives from April 1974 to 1976, succeeding David Vigen, who had resigned. His wife Elaine McCart was a member of the South Dakota Senate.
