= John B. Sanborn =

American politician

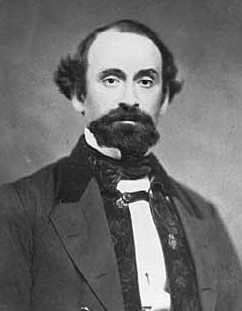
- John B. Sanborn, c. 1860
- Born: December 5, 1826; Epsom, New Hampshire, U.S.
- Died: May 6, 1904 (aged 77); Saint Paul, Minnesota, U.S.
- Burial place: Oakland Cemetery; Saint Paul, Minnesota
- Relatives: John B. Sanborn, Jr. (son); Walter H. Sanborn (nephew)
- Military career
- Allegiance: United States of America; Union
- Branch: United States Army; Union Army
- Service years: 1861–1869
- Rank: Brigadier General
- Unit: Army of the Mississippi
- Commands: Department of Southwestern Missouri; Department of Arkansas
- Conflicts: American Civil War; Battle of Iuka; Siege of Corinth; Vicksburg Campaign; Price's Raid

John Benjamin Sanborn (December 5, 1826 – May 6, 1904) was an American lawyer, politician, and soldier from the state of New Hampshire who served as a general in the Union Army during the American Civil War. He was also a key member of the reconstruction era Congressional-appointed Indian Peace Commission, which negotiated and signed several important treaties with native American tribes.

== Early life and career ==
John B. Sanborn was born on a farm in Epsom, New Hampshire, on December 5, 1826. He was the youngest of five children of Deacon Frederick and Lucy L. (Sargent) Sanborn. He was educated at the Thetford Academy and the Pembroke Academy. He briefly attended Dartmouth College in 1851–52, but left after only one quarter to join the law office of Asa Fowler in Concord. He passed his bar exam in 1854 and subsequently moved to St. Paul, Minnesota, in December of that year. In partnership with two other men, he established a law firm in January 1855.

In March 1857, Sanborn married Catherine Hall. 1859, Sanborn was elected as a Republican to the Minnesota House of Representatives for a term, and then was elected to the Minnesota State Senate in 1861. His wife died in 1860.

== Civil War ==
In April 1861, Sanborn was appointed as the Adjutant General of Minnesota. His duties included overseeing the organization and equipping of three regiments of volunteer infantry for the fledgling Union army. He became the colonel of the 4th Minnesota Infantry in December 1861. The regiment had been mustered into Federal service by companies at Fort Snelling between October 4 and December 23. Sanborn and his men moved to Benton Barracks in St. Louis, Missouri, on April 23, 1862. Sanborn led the 1st Brigade, 7th Division of the Army of the Mississippi in Maj. Gen. Henry Wager Halleck's Siege of Corinth, Mississippi, from May 18 to 30, the Battle of Iuka, September 19 and then in the Second Battle of Corinth, Oct 3–4 of that year.

Sanborn's brigade fought in Ulysses S. Grant's Central Mississippi Campaign from November 1862 to January 1863. That was followed by Grant's Vicksburg Campaign, with the Battle of Port Gibson on May 1, the Battle of Raymond eleven days later, and the Battle of Jackson on May 14. Sanborn also participated in the subsequent Battle of Champion's Hill, the Battle of Big Black River, and the Siege of Vicksburg from May 18 to July 4. During part of the time, he commanded a division. Sanborn's men performed garrison duty at Vicksburg following the surrender.

On August 4, 1863, President Abraham Lincoln appointed Sanborn to the grade of brigadier general of volunteers to rank from that date. In October of that year the U.S. War Department named him as the commander of the District of Southwestern Missouri. He played a key role in helping defeat the forces of Confederate Maj. Gen. Sterling Price during his Missouri Raid.

On February 10, 1865, President Lincoln appointed Sanborn to the grade of brevet major general of volunteers, to rank from that date, and the United States Senate confirmed the appointment on February 20, 1865. Sanborn was mustered out of the volunteers on April 30, 1866.

== Reconstruction era career ==
Following the collapse of the Confederacy in the spring of 1865, Sanborn was ordered in June to report to Maj. Gen. John Pope in the Western frontier to help subdue hostile Indians. In September he, William Bent, and famed explorer Kit Carson were appointed as commissioners to negotiate a peace treaty with several tribes. Sanborn remarried in November 1865 to Anna Elmer Nixon. From February 1867 until 1869, Sanborn was a member of the Indian Peace Commission, an appointment confirmed by the U.S. Congress. Among his accomplishments was the negotiation of the Medicine Lodge Treaty.

Sanborn commanded the District of the Upper Arkansas. He mustered out of the army in 1869 and returned to Minnesota. He resumed his partnership in the law firm of Sanborn, French and Lund. In 1872, he was elected to another term as a state representative and remained heavily involved in state politics and in various veterans organizations on both a state and national level. In 1874, he was involved in the Sanborn Contract scandal. He was again a state senator from 1891 until 1893. He married a third time, to Rachel Rice.

In May 1903, Sanborn was elected as the president of the Minnesota Historical Society. He died in St. Paul a year later on May 6, 1904, he is buried in Oakland Cemetery.

His son, John B. Sanborn, Jr., also served in the Minnesota legislature and as a federal judge on the Eighth Circuit Court of Appeals.

Maj. Gen. John B. Sanborn

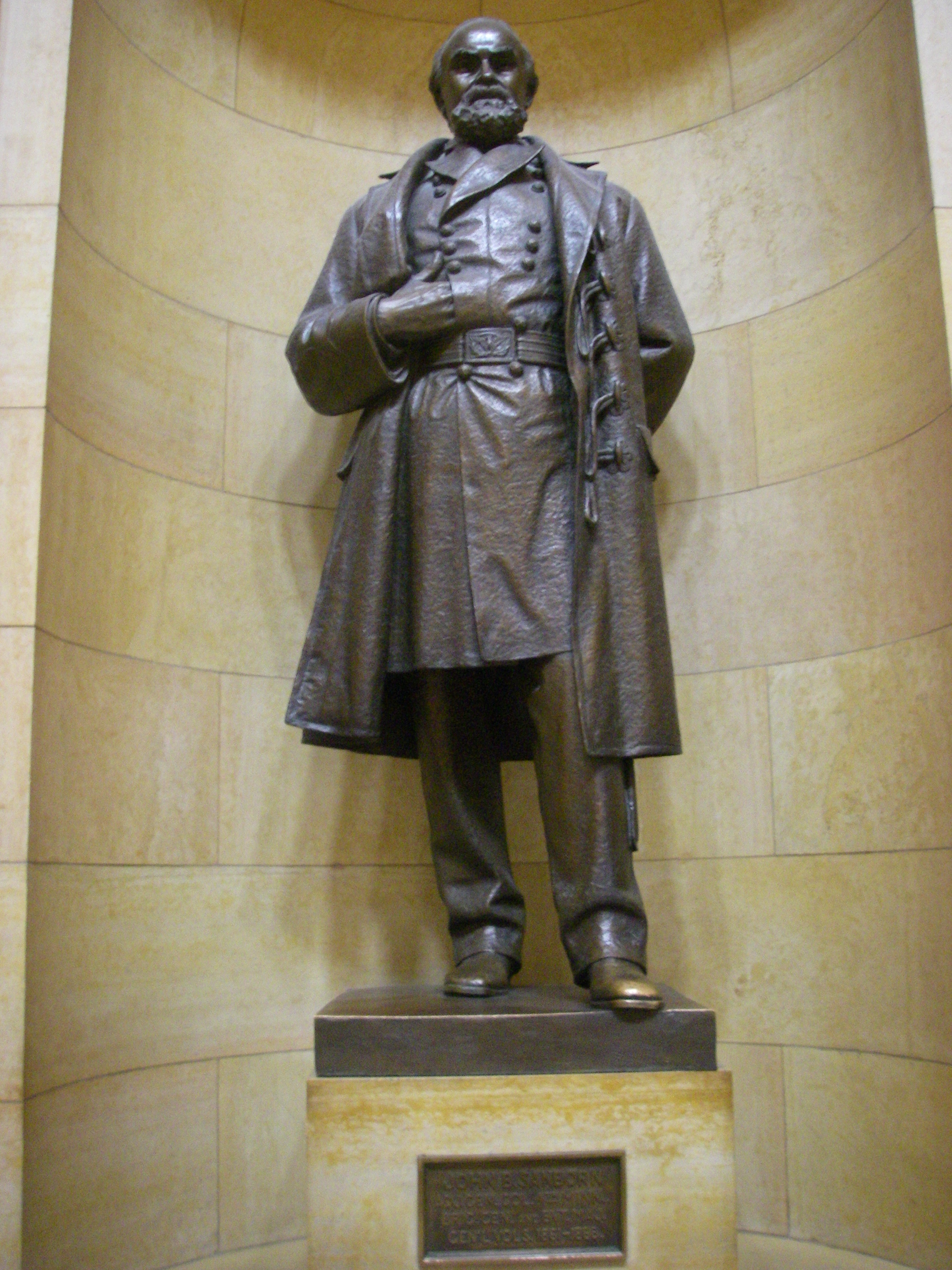
John B Sanborn statue, Minnesota State Capitol
by John Karl Daniels

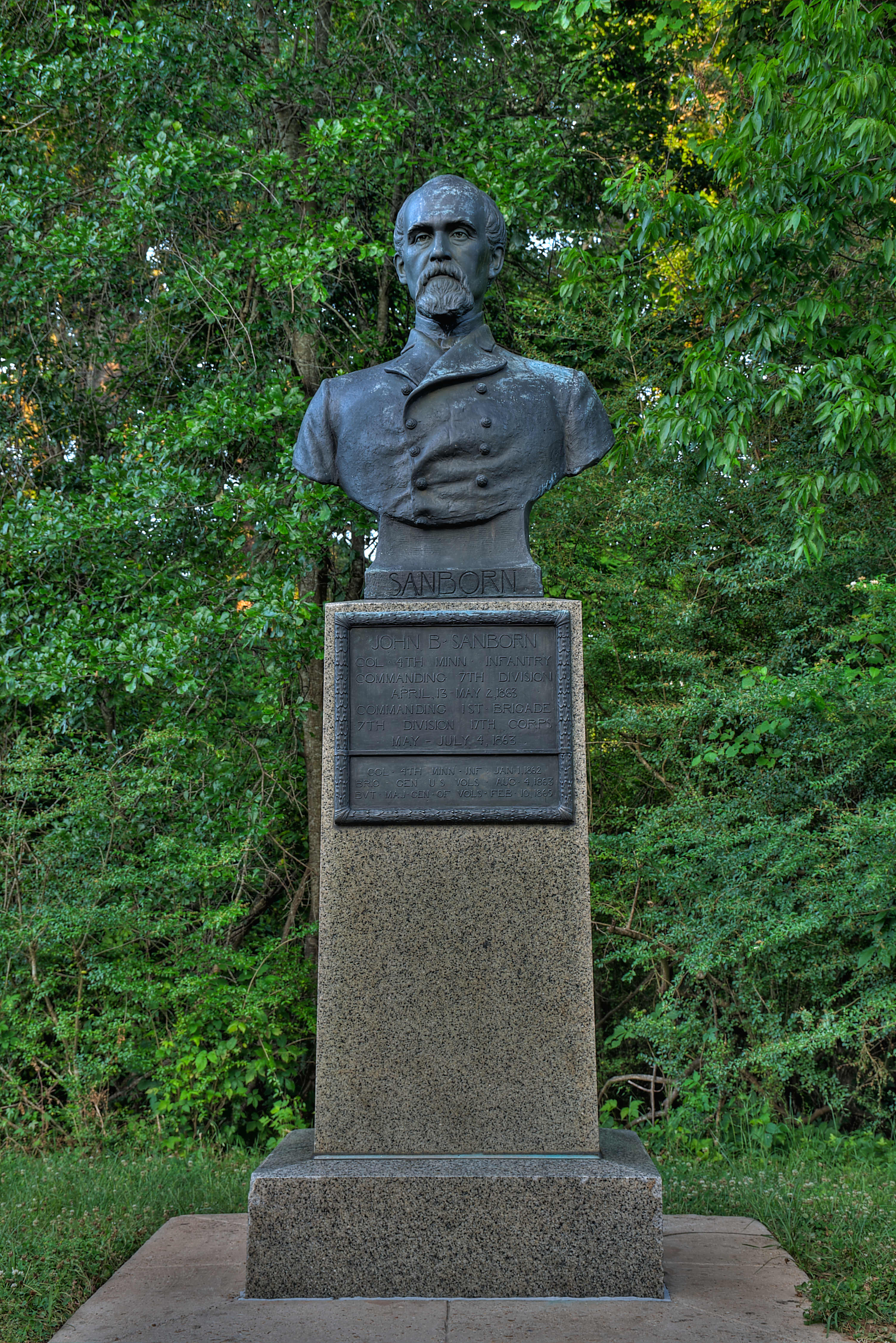
Bust of Sanborn by T.A.R. Kitson, Vicksburg National Military Park

== See also ==
- List of American Civil War generals (Union)
- Minnesota in the American Civil War
- Sanborn incident
