= Gillette Children's =

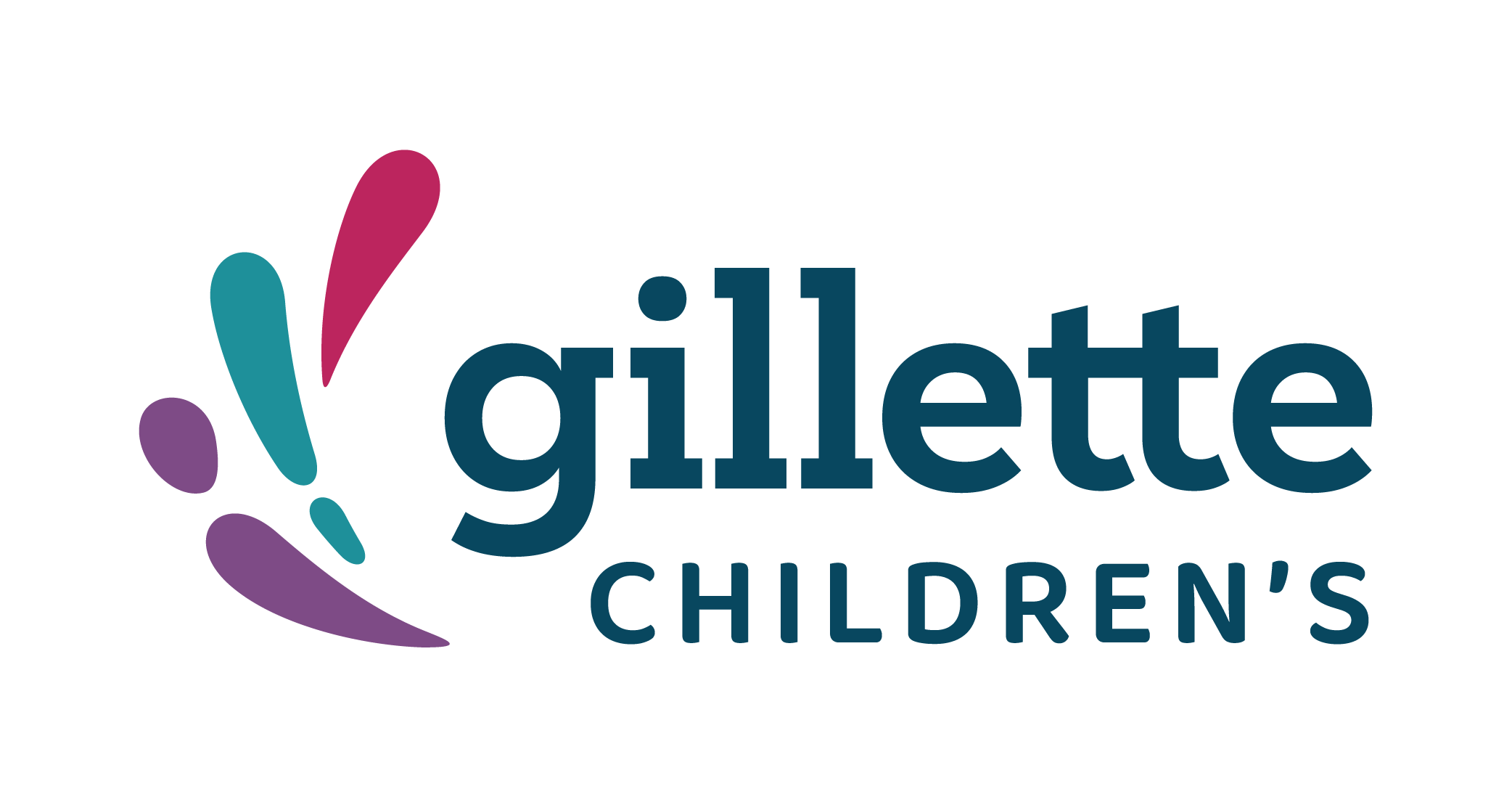

Geography
- Location: 200 East University Avenue; St. Paul, Minnesota, United States
- Coordinates: 44.9559567°N 93.0952854°W

Organization
- Care system: Not-for-profit
- Type: Children's hospital

Services
- Beds: 60

History
- Opened: 1897

Links
- Website: gillettechildrens.org
- Lists: Hospitals in Minnesota

Gillette Children's, officially known as Gillette Children's Specialty Healthcare, is a non-profit pediatric hospital located in St. Paul, Minnesota. Founded in 1897, it was the first hospital in the United States dedicated exclusively to the care of children with physical disabilities. The hospital operates independently of larger health systems and focuses on the treatment of complex orthopedic, neurologic, and rehabilitative conditions, serving patients from Minnesota, the wider United States, and internationally.

== History ==
Gillette Children's was established by an act of the Minnesota Legislature on April 23, 1897, which created the State Hospital for Indigent and Crippled Children. The effort was led by Arthur J. Gillette, an orthopedic surgeon in St. Paul, and disability advocate Jessie Haskins. Gillette was appointed the hospital's first surgeon-in-chief by the regents of the University of Minnesota. The hospital's first patient was a ten-year-old boy suffering from spinal tuberculosis who, after 18 months of treatment, was able to walk.

The hospital initially operated in a ward of the City and County Hospital of St. Paul. In 1911, it moved to a standalone facility in Phalen Park due to space constraints. Following Gillette's death, the hospital was renamed in his honor in 1926. During the 20th century, it expanded its services to meet changing medical needs, including treating patients during the polio epidemics of the 1940s and opening an on-site brace and prosthetic workshop in 1925.

In 1975, the hospital transitioned from a state-run charity to an independent nonprofit organization. In 1977, it relocated to its current campus in downtown St. Paul, adjacent to Regions Hospital, to improve access to emergency care.

In 2022, Gillette completed a meditative courtyard and an accessible children’s playground on its St. Paul campus. In 2022 and 2023, Gillette Children’s launched the Cerebral Palsy Institute and the Spine Institute.

== Operations ==
Gillette Children's operates a statewide network of clinics in Minnesota, including Twin Cities locations in Burnsville, Maple Grove, and St. Paul, as well as regional sites in Alexandria, Baxter, Bemidji, Duluth, Mankato, St. Cloud, and Willmar. It is governed as an independent non-profit organization supported by the Gillette Children's Foundation.

== Services ==
Gillette Children's treats pediatric patients with complex or rare conditions, including cerebral palsy, scoliosis, plagiocephaly, brain and spinal cord injuries, epilepsy, torticollis, hydrocephalus, craniosynostosis, spina bifida, muscular dystrophy, cleft lip and palate, limb-length discrepancy, spinal muscular atrophy, down syndrome, and osteogenesis imperfecta. The hospital provides inpatient and outpatient Rehabilitation services to support functional recovery following serious injury or complex surgery.

As a specialty medical center, Gillette focuses on patients whose conditions require highly specialized expertise and does not treat common childhood illnesses or cancer. In addition to care for children with disabilities, the hospital offers orthopedic subspecialty services for typically developing children, including hip preservation, limb difference and discrepancy, spine care, sports medicine, and upper-extremity conditions.

In addition to medical and surgical services, the hospital provides support services such as a pediatric intensive care unit (PICU), specialized dental care for patients with disabilities, and an assistive technology department that fabricates custom orthotics and prosthetics on site. For some children, care extends into adulthood to support long-term patient outcomes.
