= Minnesota Army National Guard =

Component of the US Army and military of the U.S. state of Minnesota

Headquarters, Minnesota Army National Guard
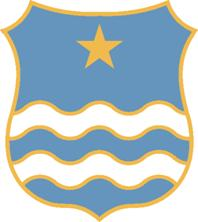
- Minnesota Army National Guard Headquarters DUI
- Active: 1856-present
- Country: United States
- Allegiance: Minnesota
- Branch: United States Army National GuardArmy National Guard
- Type: ARNG Headquarters Command
- Part of: Minnesota National Guard
- Garrison/HQ: St Paul, Minnesota

Commanders
- Commander-in-Chief: Governor Tim Walz
- Adjutant General of Minnesota: Maj. Gen. Shawn P. Manke
- The Command Senior Enlisted Advisor: Command Chief Lisa Erikson

Insignia
- Minnesota National Guard Crest

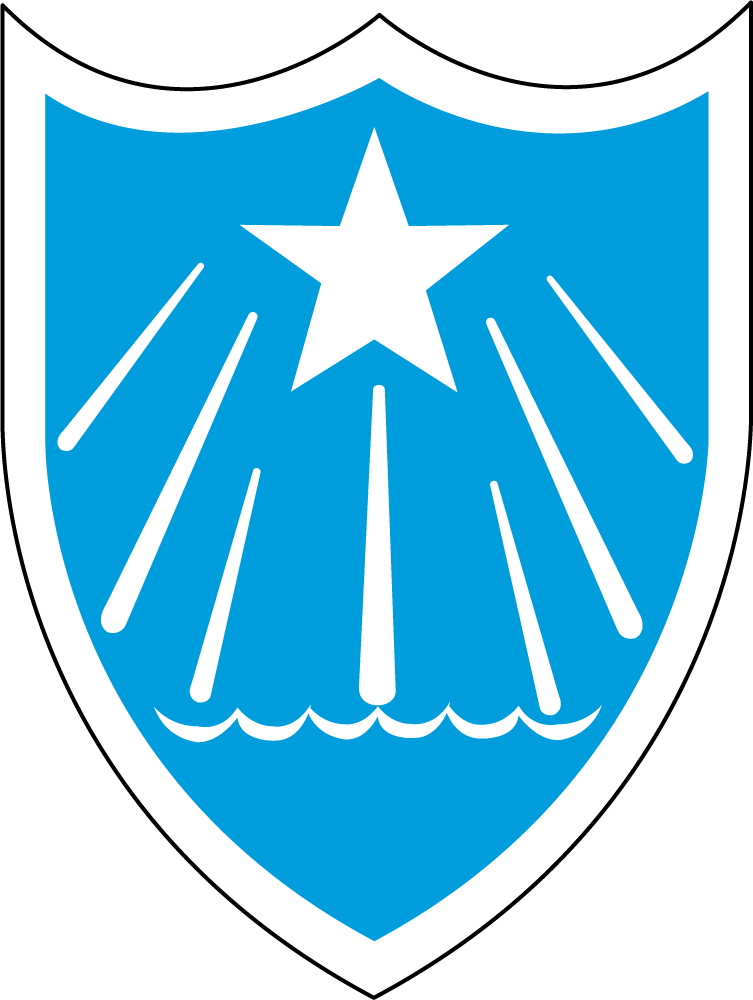
- Minnesota ARNG Headquarters SSI

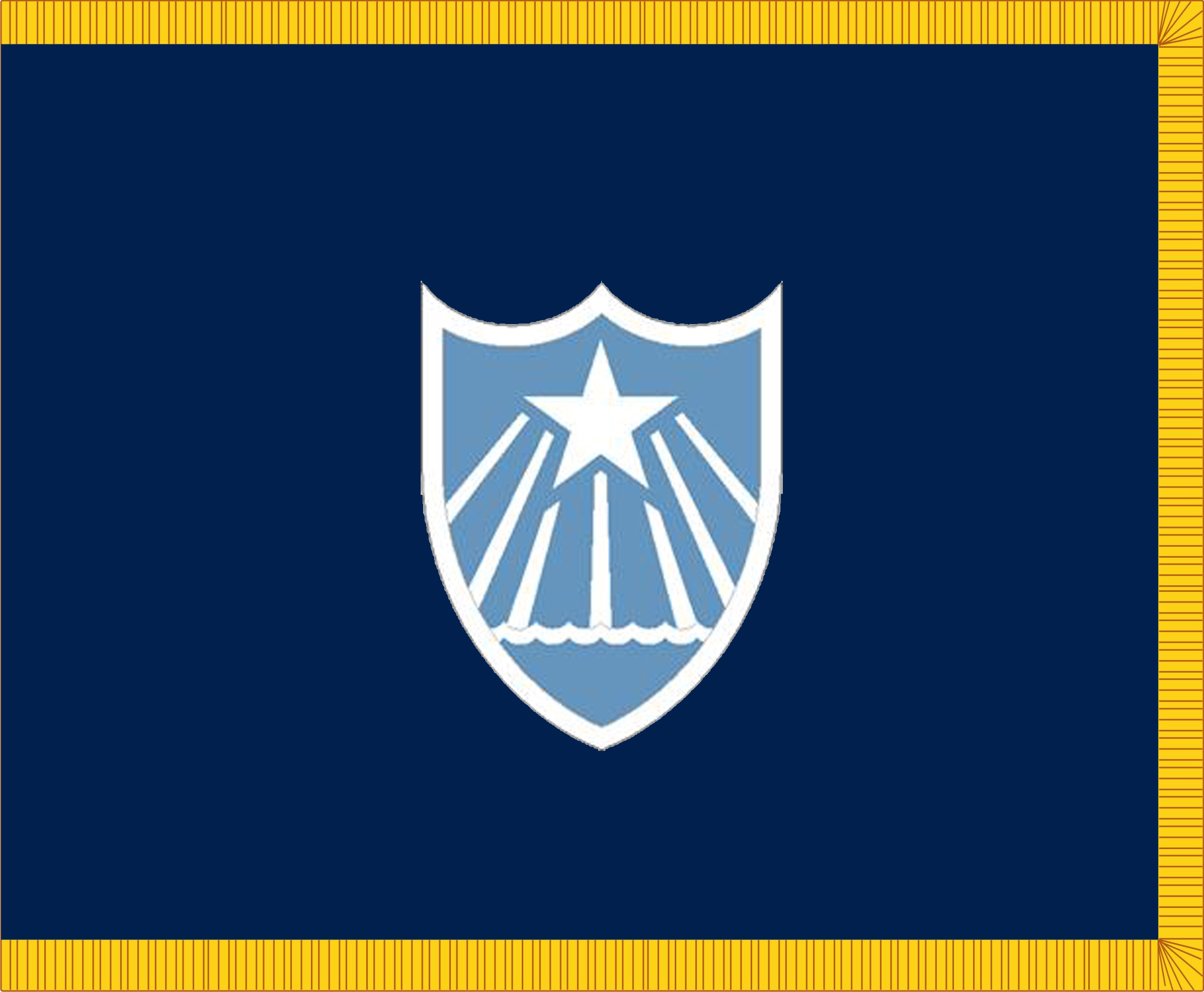
- Minnesota ARNG Headquarters Flag

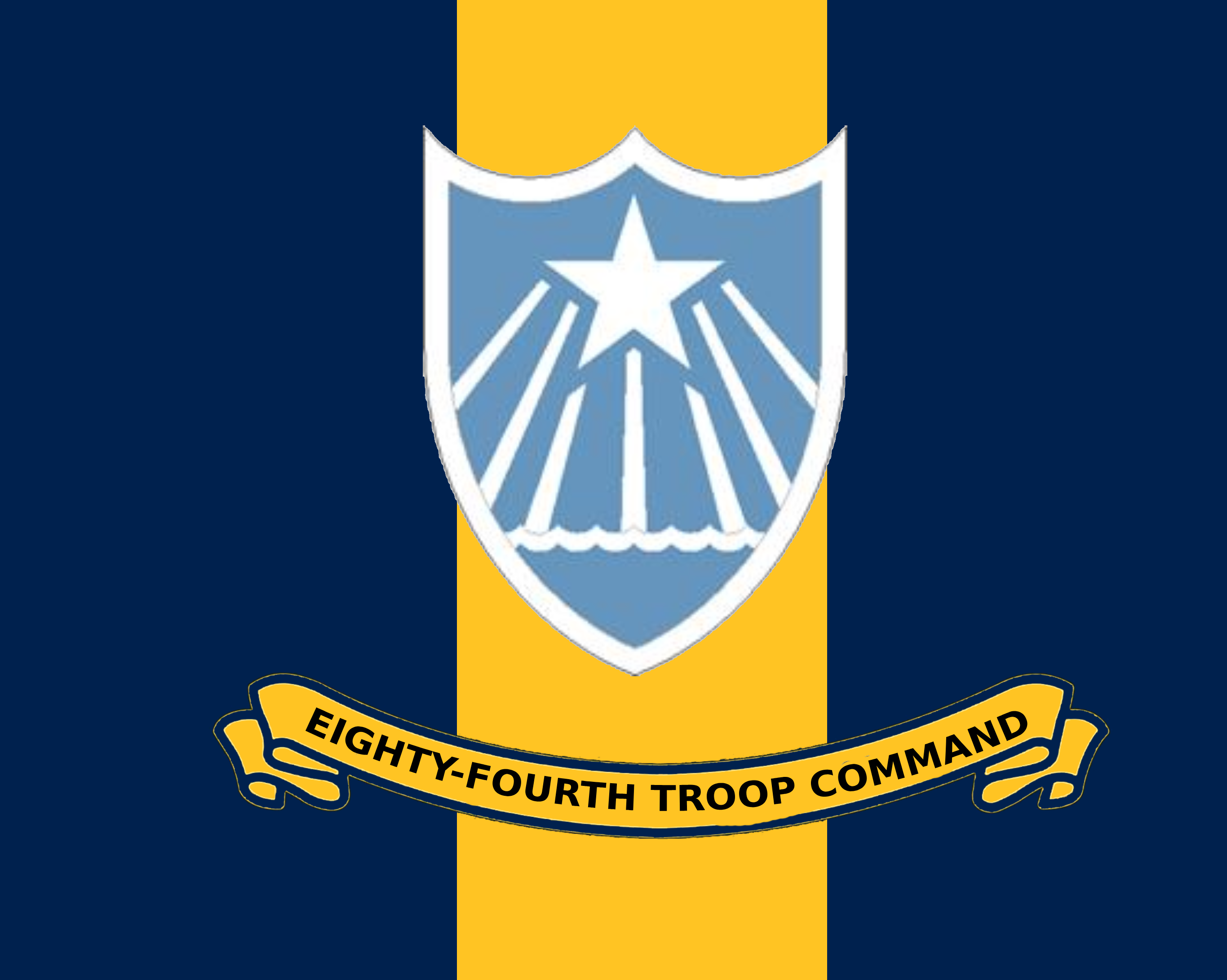
- Minnesota ARNG 84th Troop Command Flag

The Minnesota Army National Guard, along with the Minnesota Air National Guard, is an element of the Minnesota National Guard. The Constitution of the United States specifically charges the National Guard with dual federal and state missions. In fact, the National Guard is the only United States military force empowered to function in a state status. Those functions range from limited actions during non-emergency situations to full scale law enforcement of martial law when local law enforcement officials can no longer maintain civil control. The National Guard may be called into federal service in response to a call by the president or Congress.

The Minnesota Army National Guard is composed of approximately 11,000 soldiers, in 58 communities across the state.

When National Guard troops are called to federal service, the President serves as Commander-in-Chief. The federal mission assigned to the National Guard is: "To provide properly trained and equipped units for prompt mobilization for war, National emergency or as otherwise needed."

The governor may call individuals or units of the Minnesota National Guard into state service during emergencies or to assist in special situations which lend themselves to the use of the National Guard. The state mission assigned to the National Guard is: "To provide trained and disciplined forces for domestic emergencies or as otherwise provided by state law."

The State Defense force is a military entity authorized by both the State Code of Minnesota and executive order. The State Defense Force (SDF) is the state's authorized militia and assumes the state mission of the Minnesota National Guard in the event the Guard is mobilized. The SDF is composed of retired active and reserve military personnel and selected professional persons who volunteer their time and talents in further service to their state.

The Minnesota Army National Guard is a component of the United States Army and the United States National Guard. Nationwide, the Army National Guard comprises approximately one half of the US Army's available combat forces and approximately one third of its support organization. National coordination of various state National Guard units is maintained through the National Guard Bureau.

Minnesota Army National Guard units are trained and equipped as part of the United States Army. The same ranks and insignia are used and National Guardsmen are eligible to receive all United States military awards. The Minnesota Guard also bestows a number of state awards for local services rendered in or to the state of Minnesota.

== Units and formations ==
See list of Minnesota National Guard units.

== Duties ==
National Guard units can be mobilized at any time by presidential order to supplement regular armed forces, and upon declaration of a state of emergency by the governor of the state in which they serve. Unlike Army Reserve members, National Guard members cannot be mobilized individually, except through voluntary transfers and Temporary DutY Assignments TDY, but only as part of their respective units. However, there has been a significant number of individual activations to support military operations (2001-?); the legality of this policy is a major issue within the National Guard.

=== Active duty callups ===
For much of the final decades of the twentieth century, National Guard personnel typically served "one weekend a month, two weeks a year", with a portion working for the Guard in a full-time capacity. The current forces formation plans of the US Army call for the typical National Guard unit (or national guardsman) to serve one year of active duty for every three years of service. More specifically, current Department of Defense policy is that no guardsman will be involuntarily activated for a total of more than 24 months (cumulative) in one six-year enlistment period (this policy is due to change 1 August 2007, the new policy states that soldiers will be given 24 months between deployments of no more than 24 months, individual states have differing policies).

== History ==
The Minnesota Army National Guard was originally formed in 1856. The Militia Act of 1903 organized the various state militias into the present National Guard system.

== See also ==
- Minnesota Naval Militia
- Minnesota State Guard
- Minnesota Wing Civil Air Patrol
