= Minnesota National Guard =

National Guard of the US state Minnesota

- Seal of the Minnesota National Guard
- Active: 1856–Present
- Country: United States of America
- Allegiance: State of Minnesota
- Type: Joint
- Size: 13,060
- Part of: U.S. National Guard
- Garrison/HQ: St Paul, Minnesota
- Nickname: NorthStar Guard
- Motto: Always Ready

Commanders
- Commander-in-Chief: Governor Tim Walz
- Adjutant General of Minnesota: Maj. Gen. Shawn P. Manke
- The Command Senior Enlisted Advisor: Command Chief Lisa Erikson

The Minnesota National Guard is the component of the United States National Guard based in Minnesota, composed of more than 13,000 soldiers and airmen in the Minnesota Army National Guard and Minnesota Air National Guard, serving in 61 communities.

The Minnesota National Guard finds its origins in the Minnesota Pioneer Guard, first organized in St. Paul in April 1856, and formalized by Henry Hastings Sibley in 1858. The guard was deployed in-state for the Wright County War of 1858. Due to Governor Alexander Ramsey's quick support of Abraham Lincoln on the breakout of the American Civil War, the First Minnesota Volunteer Infantry Regiment is recognized as the first unit to volunteer to fight. The 1st Minnesota battled bravely at the Battle of Gettysburg, leading a famous bayonet charge.

The Minnesota Guard played roles in the Spanish–American War, World War I, and World War II.

The 34th Infantry Division and other Minnesota Guard units played large roles in the Global War on Terror in the 2000s. The Minnesota Guard deployed in-state to handle unrest during the George Floyd protests in Minneapolis–Saint Paul, and the subsequent trial of Derek Chauvin. The Guard was again mobilized in January 2026 following the killing of Alex Pretti.

== History ==
=== Formation ===
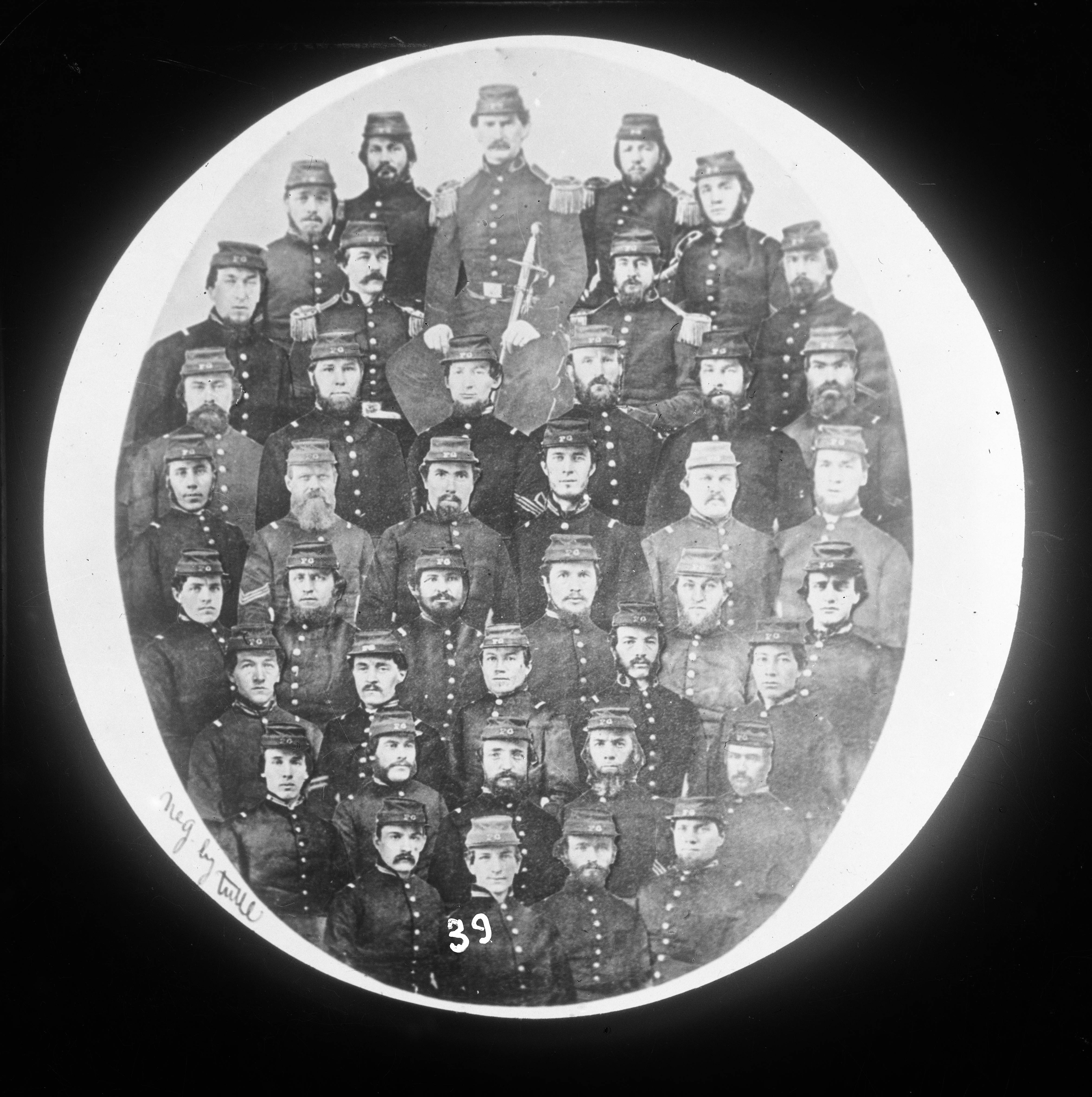
Minnesota Pioneer Guard

The Minnesota Pioneer Guard was organized on April 15, 1856. A rented hall on Wabasha Street in St. Paul served as its armory. It was the first organized military company in the state. Their uniforms consisted of a blue, single-breasted coat and sky blue pants. The coat had three rows of gilt buttons. A binding of orange cord decorated the coat, and orange stripes went down the pant legs. Orange pompoms decorated the hats of the private, and orange plumes for those of the officers. An company made up of Irish citizens of St. Paul was formed on July 8, 1856, called the Shields Guards. The City of St. Anthony followed up with the formation of the Falls City Light Guards on July 12, 1856. The Red Wing Rifles were formed in March 1957. The St. Paul Light Cavalry Company was organized on April 15, 1857.

The guard was formally reorganized under state law on November 4, 1858. Any group to raise forty men into a militia would be appointed an officer to lead the company by the governor. Six months later, the companies stood as the Minnesota Pioneer Guard, City Guard, and Light Cavalry, of St. Paul; and the Jackson Rifles, Stillwater Guard, Washington Light Artillery, Red Wing Rifles, Mankato Rifle Company, Garden City Sharpshooters, Little Falls Guard, and St. Cloud Rifle Company. Additional companies were at Blue Earth City and Traverse des Sioux.

The Guard performed parade marches at annual Fourth of July festivities, Alexander Ramsey's gubernatorial inauguration, and other festivities. A guard band was created on November 30, 1858.

Future railroad tycoon James J. Hill was a member of the Pioneer Guard. When the Civil War broke out, he wanted to join the First Minnesota Volunteer Infantry Regiment, but due to blindness in one eye he did not pass medical inspection.

=== Wright County War ===
In September 1858, Henry A. Wallace, a 28 year-old assessor of Rockford, Minnesota, was murdered and his body found on his property. A sharecropper who had been working with Wallace, Oscar F. Jackson, was put on trial and found not guilty on April 3, 1859. On April 24, a mob assembled and took Jackson from the protective safekeeping of the Wright County sheriff. Jackson was lynched the following day.

On April 29, Governor of Minnesota Henry Hastings Sibley Sibley issued a reward for $500 for the apprehension and conviction of those responsible for Jackson's lynching, calling it a "high-handed outrage against the peace and dignity of the state". The $500 reward went unclaimed until July 1858 when Jackson's wife Elizabeth spotted Emery W. Moore at a gathering in Minnehaha Falls. Moore had been a member of the lynch mob. Mrs. Jackson alerted St. Paul's chief of police, who arrested Moore for murder, and he was sent to Rockford to stand trial. However, before Moore could be tried for murder he was set free by a group of vigilantes.

On August 5, 1859, Sibley mustered the Minnesota militia, declaring the "civil officers of Wright county" as "perfectly powerless to enforce and execute laws", and a state of insurrection to exist within the county. Among the troops who responded were forty-two St. Paul Pioneer Guards, forty-five Stillwater Guards, and thirty-five St. Paul police. The state militia and police interrogated citizens until they found three of the mob assailants responsible for Jackson's lynching. However, when put before a grand jury the assailants were not indicted.

=== Civil War ===
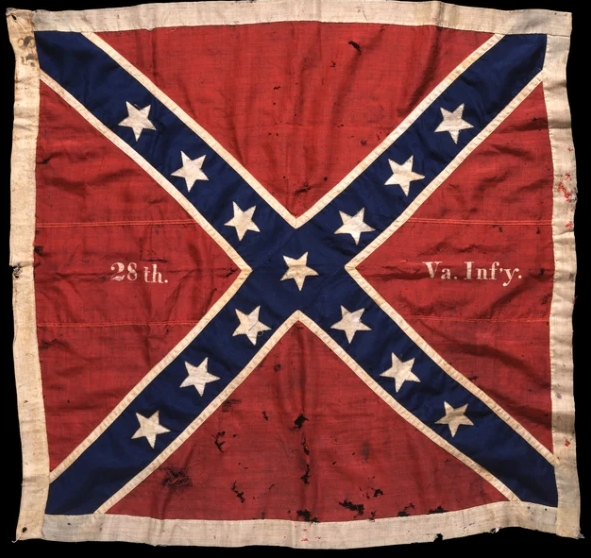
The 28th Virginia battle flag

The morning after the Battle of Fort Sumter, Alexander Ramsey, governor of Minnesota, was in Washington D.C. and stated to Secretary of War Simon Cameron that Minnesota would volunteer 1,000 troops for the cause of the Civil War. Cameron had Ramsey write out the offer, and took it to Abraham Lincoln later that day. It would be the first such offer accepted by the federal government. From the Minnesota militia would be put together the 1st Minnesota Infantry Regiment. The first man to enlist in the "First Minnesota" was Josias Ridgate King, later earning a commission and serving as the inspector general of the nascent Minnesota National Guard; he would become known as the "Father of the Minnesota Guard". Willis A. Gorman, former governor of the Minnesota territory, was named as the colonel of the First Minnesota.

One month after leaving Fort Snelling, on July 21, 1861, the First Regiment participated in the First Battle of Bull Run. Forty two Minnesotans were killed, 108 were wounded, and thirty went missing. At the Battle of Antietam on September 17, 1862, the regiment saw 147 more casualties. The regiment, now much weaker than its original 1,000 men, accompanied the rest of the Army of the Potomac towards Gettysburg.

==== Battle of Gettysburg ====
On the morning of July 3, 1863, Confederate General Robert E. Lee ordered an attack on the Union Army during the Battle of Gettysburg. The 28th Virginia Infantry Regiment was part of a brigade led by Brigadier General Richard Garnett, positioned at the point of a lopsided V-shape formed by the marching Confederate troops. The Union soldiers, located ahead of and above the Confederate troops, opened fire, but the Confederates broke through up Cemetery Ridge in places.

The First Minnesota was ordered to attack the flank of the Confederate troops, and did so while protecting their own flag after the last remaining member of their color guard was shot through the hand. More than 70% of the regiment's members were killed, wounded, or captured in the course of the battle. The 28th Virginia battle flag was captured by Private Marshall Sherman of the 1st Minnesota Infantry Regiment, Company C. Sherman would later be awarded the Medal of Honor for his actions during the battle.

==== Post-war ====
After the war, Minnesota's militia fell into disarray. In 1879, an effort was made to revive it and the Minneapolis Light Infantry was created on May 12.

The first annual encampments of the Minnesota Guard took place in White Bear Lake in 1882 and 1883. In 1884, the annual training was held at a makeshift camp at Lake Calhoun called Camp Sheridan. Encampments were again held at White Bear Lake in 1885 and 1886. In 1887, it was held at Fort Snelling. At this time, the Uniformed Services Employment and Re-employment Rights Act of 1994 had not yet been passed; employers rarely gave Soldiers time off to attend the trainings, so men would work all day, take the train to the encampment in the evening, and then an early train back to the city in the morning.

In 1888, the state began training at Camp Lakeview in Lake City, Minnesota along Lake Pepin.

=== Spanish–American War ===
The Minnesota National Guard's newly-formed 13th Minnesota Infantry Regiment fought Spanish soldiers and Filipino insurrectionists from 1898-99. The 13th took the right flank in the Battle of Manila under the command of Major General Arthur MacArthur Jr.

=== First World War ===
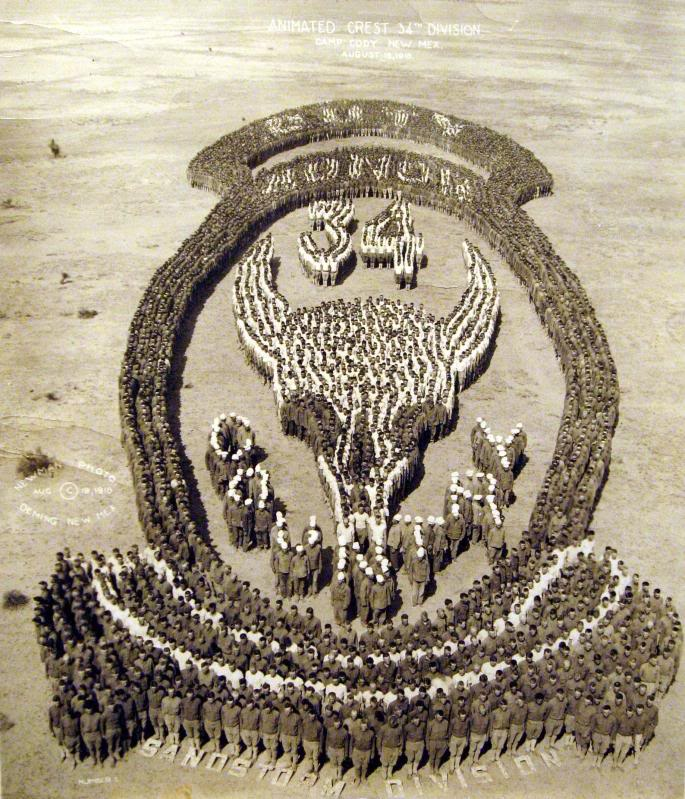
Human animated crest of the Sandstorm Division, 34th Division, Camp Cody, New Mexico

Following the conclusion of the war, General Ellard A. Walsh, the Assistant Adjutant General of Minnesota, realized that Camp Lakeview was insufficiency for training of the Minnesota Guard. By 1929, he had settled upon the former location of Fort Ripley and by December, approval was given from the War Department. The State of Minnesota purchased the land, some 13,000 acres. Money from federal appropriations was used to build the field training center. While the land is owned by the State of Minnesota, the buildings are owned federally.

=== Second World War ===
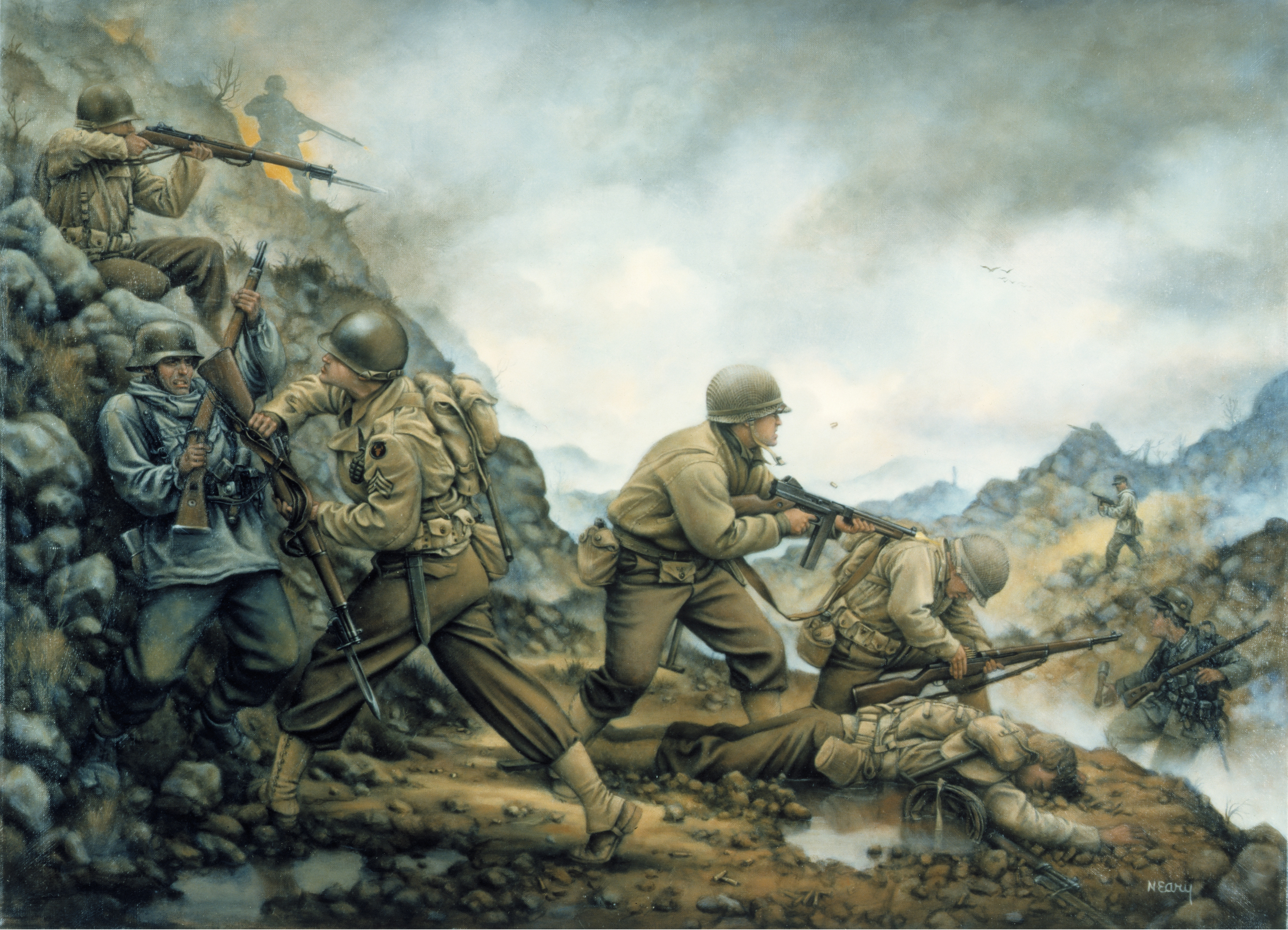
The Red Bull Division in the Winter Line of Pantano, Italy – November 29 to December 3, 1943

=== Cold War and late 20th century ===
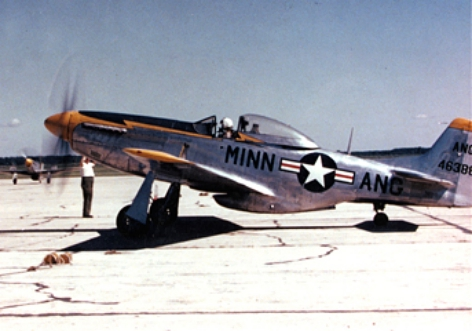
An F-51D of the Minnesota Air National Guard in the early 1950s

=== Global War on Terror ===
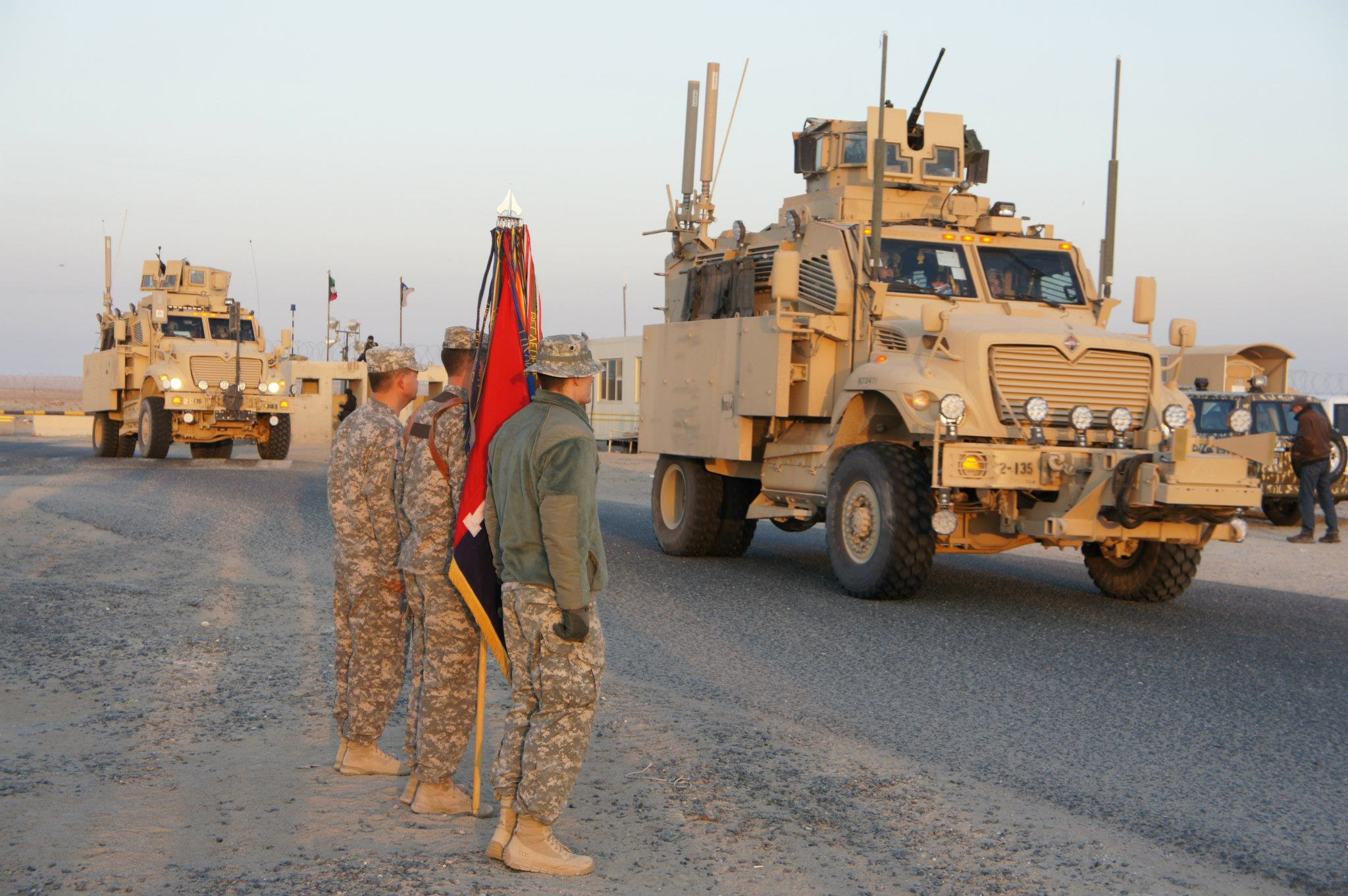
Soldiers from the 1st Brigade Combat Team, 34th Red Bull Infantry Division stand at attention with the brigade colors as 1/34th BCT Caiman vehicles cross the Iraqi border into Kuwait for the last time

The Minnesota National Guard's involvement in the global war on terror began immediately on September 11, 2001, protecting the airspace over Washington, D.C. immediately after the September 11 attacks. In the days following, they provided protection to the airspace around Minneapolis, including a Monday Night Football game between the Green Bay Packers and Washington Redskins.

In 2003, around 1,100 Minnesota National Guard troops deployed to Bosnia to assist with peacekeeping missions. Eight hundred Minnesota National Guard troops deployed to Kosovo as part of the NATO operation Kosovo Force in 2003.

The Minnesota National Guard deployed 2,600 troops to Iraq, activating them for preparations in October 2005 and deploying in March 2006. In January 2007, they learned they would be affected by the Iraq War troop surge of 2007 extending their stay in Iraq by eighteen weeks. When they returned in July 2007, they had been mobilized for 22 months, 16 of which were in Iraq; up until that point, they had been deployed the longest of any National Guard unit during the Iraq war. Throughout Operation Iraqi Freedom, over 8,000 Minnesota National Guard soldiers and airmen deployed to Iraq. Fourteen members of the Minnesota National Guard died in Iraq, and 79 earned the Purple Heart.

The Duluth-based 148th Fighter Wing provided real-time surveillance for ground commanders using their Theater Aerial Reconnaissance System. St. Paul's 34th Combat Aviation Brigade was responsible for corps-level helicopter support from 2008 to 2009. In 2009-2010, the 34th Red Bull Infantry Division Headquarters provided command and control for 16,000 U.S. military Service members operating in nine of Iraq's 18 provinces. With the prevalence of improvised explosive devices on the roadways in Iraq, the St. Paul–based 133rd Airlift Wing provided critical aerial transportation of people, equipment and materiel throughout the region.

Around 3,000 members of the 1st Armored Brigade Combat Team, 34th Infantry Division deployed to Kuwait and Iraq in 2011; this deployment was the largest in Minnesota National Guard history since World War II.

=== Stateside missions ===
Minnesota's Department of Military Affairs oversees and supports military operations of the Minnesota National Guard when they are under state control to ensure the safety of Minnesotans. DMA coordinates federal and state resources. The department comprises all military forces and installations within the state.

==== George Floyd protests ====
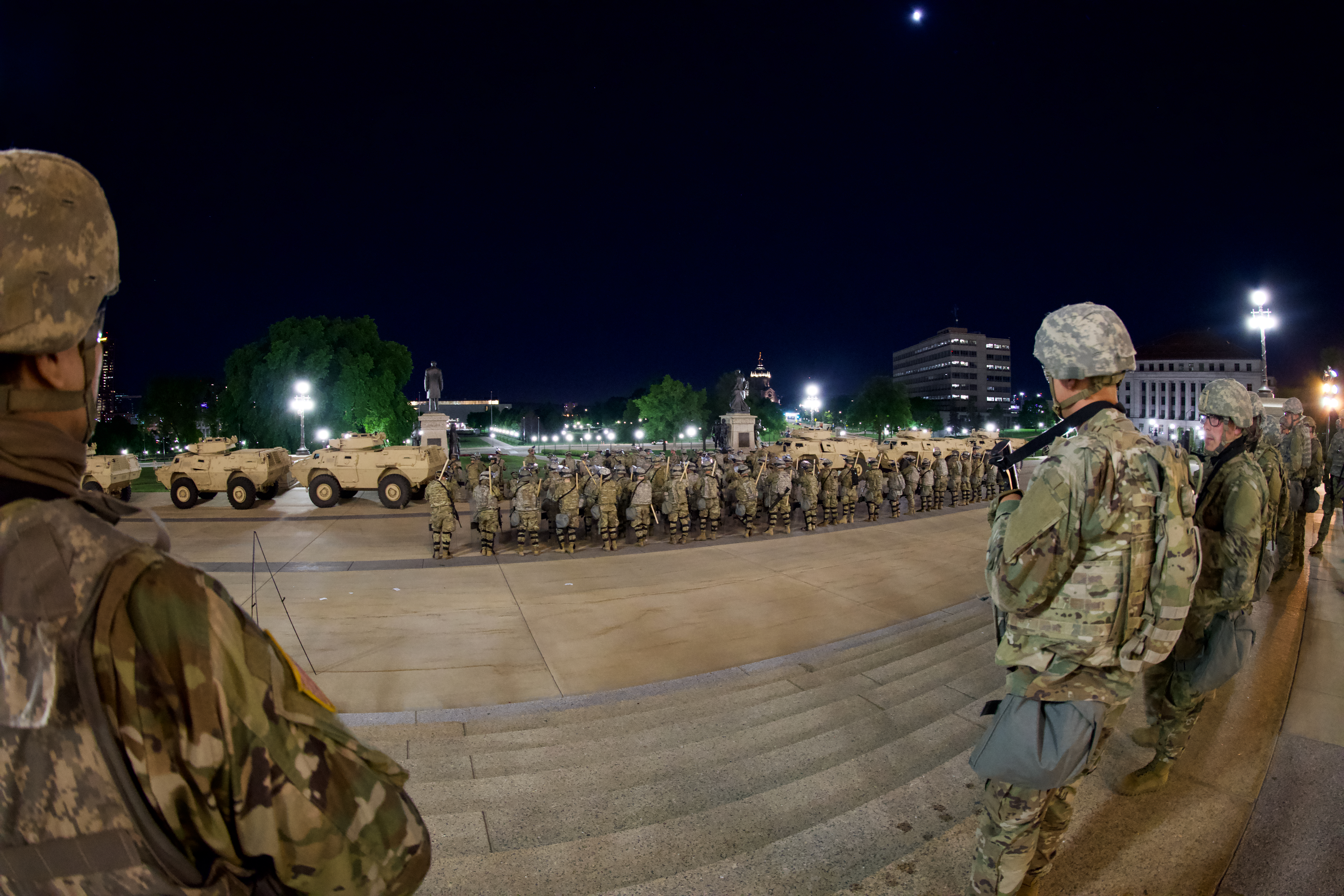
Minnesota National Guard Soldiers and Airmen stand guard overnight alongside local law enforcement, protecting Minnesota's Capitol area May 30, 2020.

In mid 2020, the Minnesota National Guard was mobilized in full in response to the George Floyd protests in Minneapolis–Saint Paul. However, the Minnesota National Guard delayed its arrival to areas where unrest was occurring and afterwards received criticism for "lagging" in its response to the riots. After being activated, Minnesota National Guard adjutant general Maj. Gen. Jon A. Jensen claimed he and other guardsman were not provided clear directions by Minnesota governor Tim Walz on how to respond to the protests and riots. It was noted that no Minnesota guardsmen were present during the May 29, 2020, riot which destroyed numerous businesses in Minneapolis and did not clear streets until the next day.

The Minnesota National Guard conducted a security mission alongside local law enforcement as street protests turned violent over the murder of George Floyd. A soldier from the Minnesota National Guard fired his weapon at a vehicle that was speeding towards police officers and National Guard soldiers in Minneapolis. The driver of the vehicle was given several verbal commands, and nonverbal signals in an attempt to slow the driver down. After the driver refused to stop, a soldier fired 3 rounds towards the speeding vehicle. Minnesota National Guard Major General Jon Jensen said "Our soldier fired 3 rounds from his rifle in response to a perceived and legitimate threat to him and the Minnesota police officers he was in direct support of." By June 7, when the troops demobilized, 7,123 members of the Minnesota National Guard had been called into duty in the largest deployment in the state's history since World War II.

==== Trial of Derek Chauvin ====
In early 2021, the Minnesota National Guard was proactively mobilized for protests in Minneapolis regarding the trial of Derek Chauvin that began in March and concurrently responded to protests and unrest over killing of Daunte Wright by a police officer on April 11. Two National Guard soldiers sustained minor injuries after being shot at while sitting in a military vehicle. The two soldiers suffered injuries that included glass fragments in an eye and facial cuts caused by the shattering glass. One soldier was transported to a hospital for treatment. Hennepin County officials charged Andrew Thomas, a 28-year-old man with home address in Minneapolis and Chicago, with first-degree and second-degree assault with a dangerous weapon and illegal weapons possession. In July 2021, Thomas pleaded guilty in Hennepin County court to charges related to the drive-by shooting and illegal possession of a firearm. He received an eight-year sentence that included five years in jail and three years under supervised release.

== Installations ==
=== Camp Ripley ===
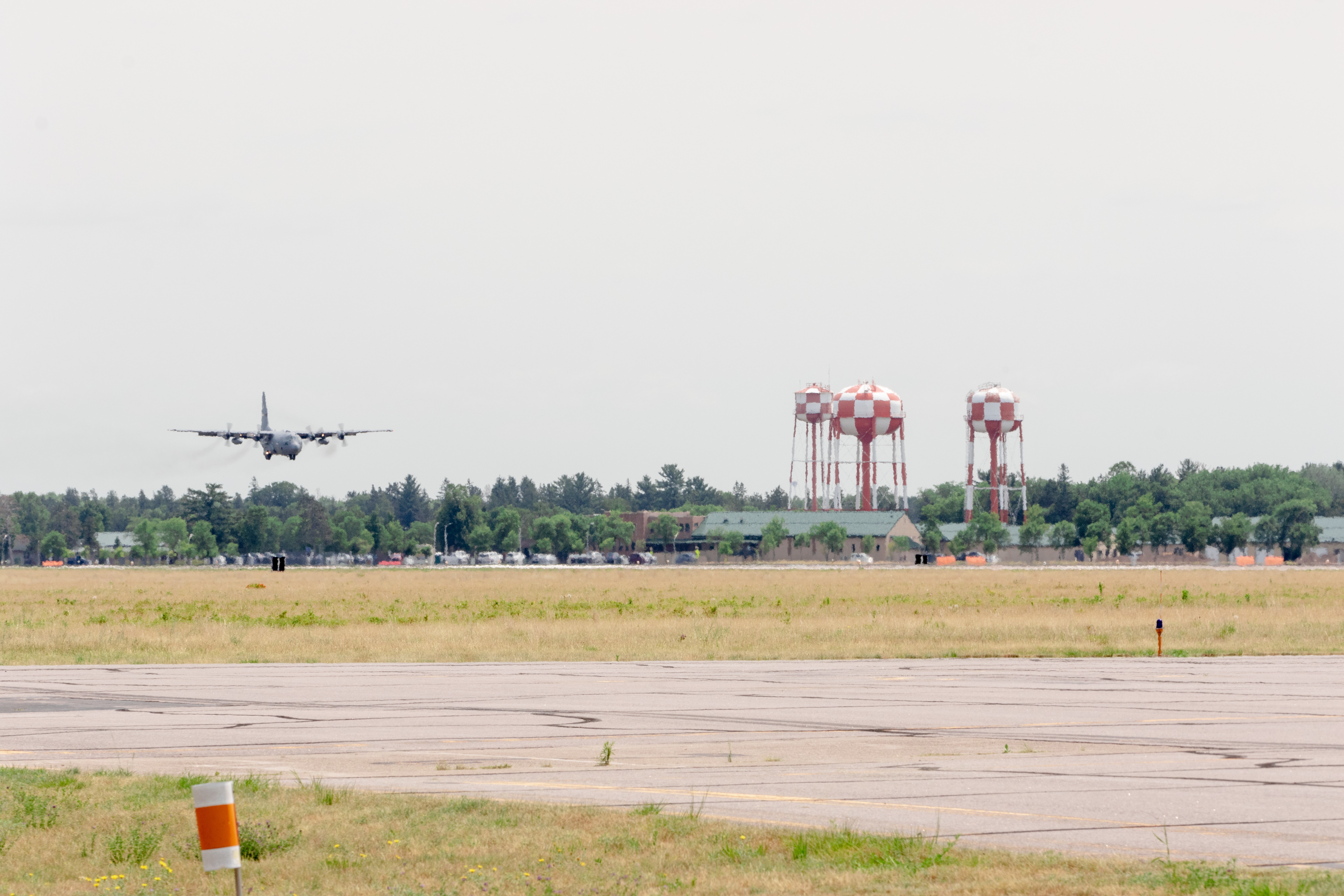
A C-130 landing at Camp Ripley

Following World War I, the State of Minnesota purchased some 13,000 acres near Little Falls to be used for military training. The remains of the former federal Fort Ripley were within the boundaries, and the name of Camp Ripley was given to the new facility. The State of Minnesota owns the land, while the federal government owns the buildings. It is a dual military and civilian training facility operated by the Minnesota National Guard near the city of Little Falls in the central part of the state. The location of the camp was selected in 1929 by Ellard A. Walsh, Assistant Adjutant General of the State of Minnesota.

=== Camp Lakeview ===
Camp Lakeview was a military training facility for the Minnesota National Guard in Lake City, Minnesota, on the shores of Lake Pepin from 1881 to 1930. It was superseded by Camp Ripley.

=== Minneapolis Armory ===
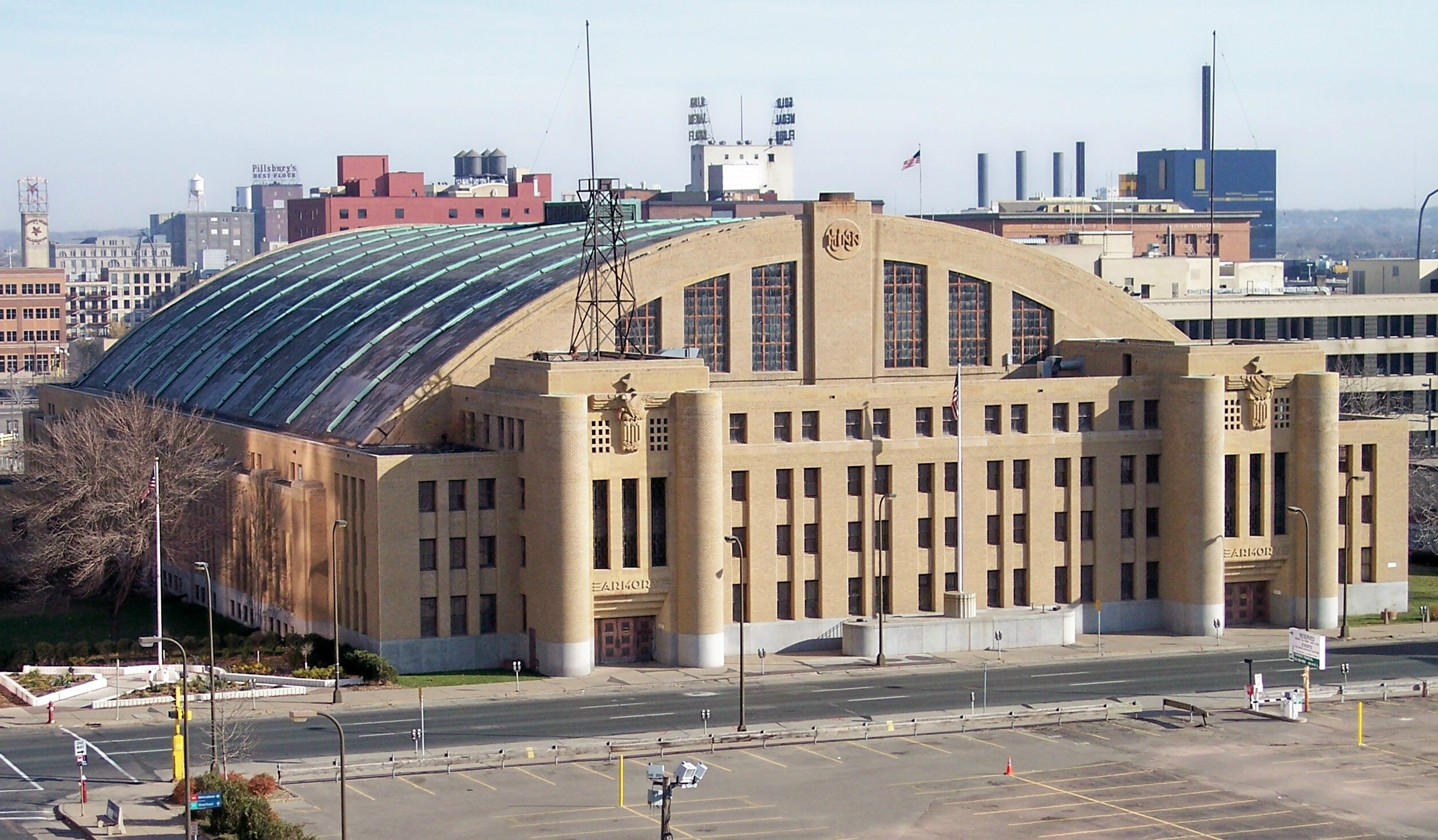
The Minneapolis Armory

The Minneapolis Armory was completed in 1935 at a cost of $1,000,000 ($23.5 million in 2025), using a Public Works Administration grant of $185,000 and a city tax of .04 mills over 30 years. The guard stopped using the building in 1983. It was sold and now serves as an event venue.

=== Armories ===
In addition to Camp Ripley, the Minnesota National Guard operates some 64 armories throughout the state.

== Units ==
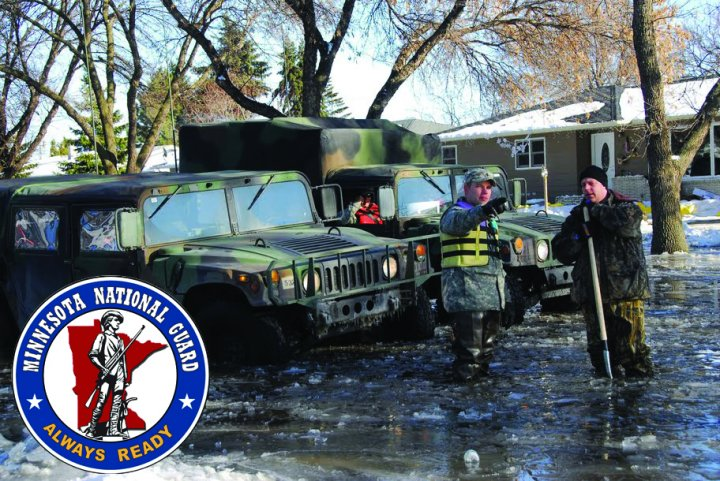
Minnesota National Guard Staff Sgt. Robin Mattson speaks with a local resident while patrolling the streets of Moorhead, Minn. during flood fighting operations March 28, 2009. Approximately 500 members of the Minnesota National Guard, under the direction of the Governor of Minnesota, continued to provide assistance to civil authorities in support of flood fighting efforts during the record high flood.

- Joint Force Headquarters and Headquarters Detachment
- 175th Regiment (Regional Training Institute)

=== Minnesota Army National Guard ===
- 34th Infantry Division
  - 1st Armored Brigade Combat Team
  - 34th Combat Aviation Brigade
  - 34th Division Artillery
- 84th Troop Command
- 347th Regional Support Group

=== Minnesota Air National Guard ===
- 133rd Airlift Wing
- 148th Fighter Wing

=== Minnesota State Guard ===
A separate but currently inactive component of the organized militia of Minnesota, the Minnesota State Guard, is a state defense force previously activated during World War I and World War II while the National Guard was federalized. It is defined by MN Statute 190.06.

== Leaders ==
Adjutants General:

1. James M. Boal
2. Sylvanus Lowry
3. Isaac Van Etten
4. Alex C. Jones
5. William H. Acker
6. John B. Sanborn
7. Oscar Malmros
8. John Peller
9. Horatio P. Van Cleve
10. Mark D. Flower
11. Henry A. Castle
12. Horatio P. Van Cleve
13. A. C. Hawley
14. C. M. McCarthy
15. F. W. Seely
16. John H. Mullen
17. Herman Muehlberg
18. George C. Lambert
19. Ellias D. Libbey
20. Fred B. Wood
21. Walter F. Rhinow
22. Ellard A. Walsh
23. Joseph C. Nelson
24. Chester J. Moeglein
25. James G. Sieben
26. Robert Schauman
27. Eugene R. Andreotti
28. Harry A. Sieben, Jr.
29. Larry W. Shellito
30. Richard C. Nash
31. Jon A. Jensen
32. Shawn P. Manke

Senior Enlisted

1. CSM Scott P. Valentine, State Command Sgt. Maj. (unknown date) – 1980
2. CSM James L. Wolcott, State Command Sgt. Maj. 1980 – 1989
3. CSM Jeffrey A. Seaberg, State Command Sgt. Maj. 1990 – 1992
4. CSM Thomas P. Young, State Command Sgt. Maj. 1992 – 1995
5. CSM Judd L. Watson, State Command Sgt. Maj. 1995 – 1998
6. CSM Charles J. Benda, State Command Sgt. Maj. 1998 – 2002
7. CSM Robert L. Boone, State Command Sgt. Maj. 2002 – 2007
8. CSM Edward Scott Mills, State Command Sgt. Maj. 2007 – 2011
9. CSM Cynthia A. Kallberg, Senior Enlisted Advisor, 2011 – 2014
10. CSM Douglas J. Wortham; Senior Enlisted Advisor 2014 – 2019
11. CSM Brian Soper, Command Senior Enlisted Advisor, 2019 – 2020
12. CCMSgt Lisa Erikson, Command Senior Enlisted Advisor, 2021 - 2024
13. CSM Jason Rost, Command Senior Enlisted Advisor, 2025 - present

== See also ==
- Minnesota Naval Militia
- Minnesota State Guard
- Minnesota Wing Civil Air Patrol
