= Richard C. Nash =

United States Army National Guard Major General

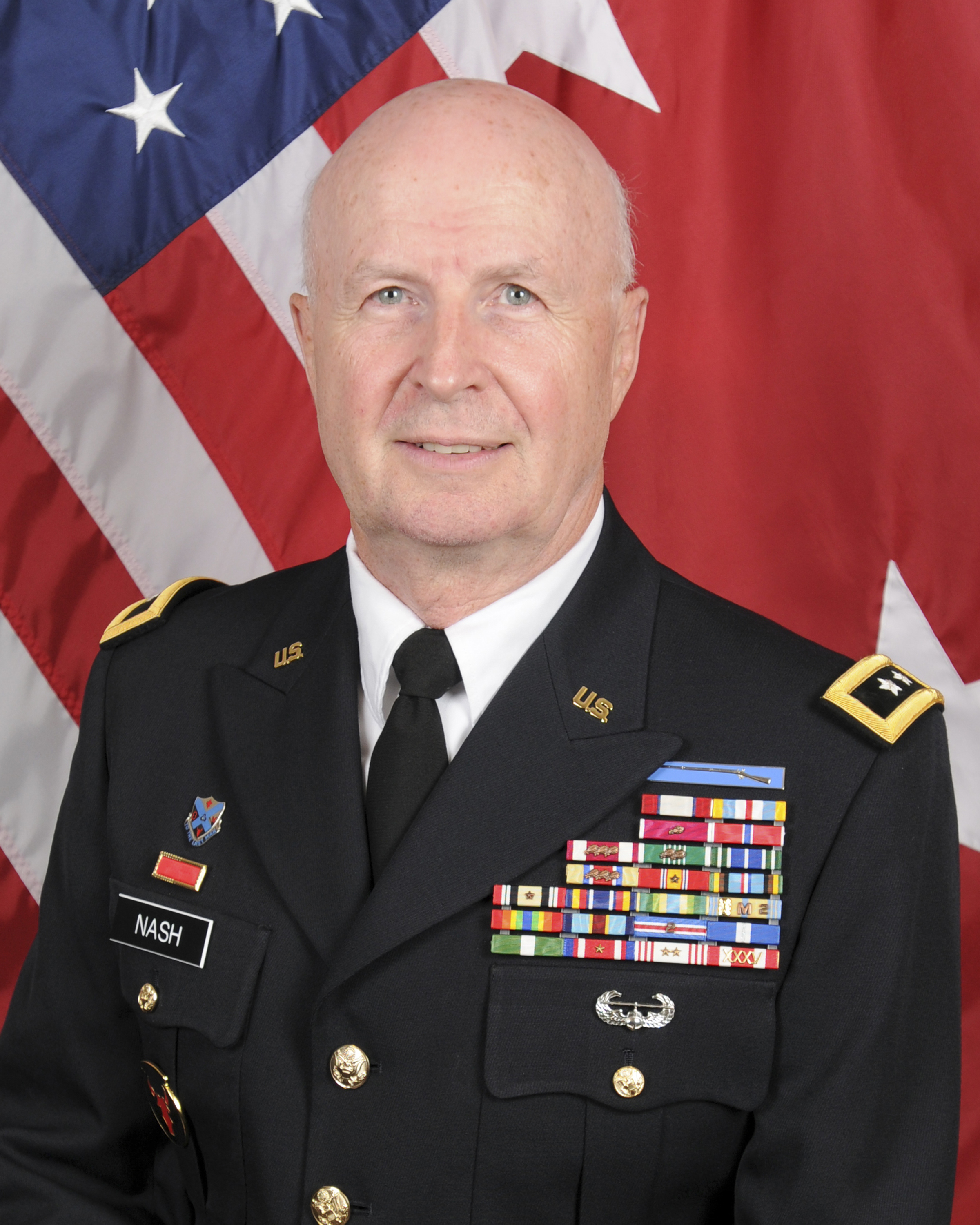
- LTG Richard C. Nash
- Born: 1950 (age 75–76); Minnesota, U.S.
- Military career
- Allegiance: United States of America
- Branch: United States Army; Army National Guard
- Service years: 1976–2017
- Rank: Lieutenant General (MSG); Major General (Army)
- Nickname: Rick
- Commands: Minnesota National Guard; 34th Infantry Division; Multi-National Division-South, Iraq; Multi-National Brigade-North, Bosnia; 1st Brigade, 34th Infantry Division; 2nd Battalion, 135th Infantry Regiment; 1st Battalion, 135th Infantry Regiment
- Conflicts: Bosnian War; Iraq War
- Awards: Army Distinguished Service Medal; Defense Superior Service Medal; Legion of Merit (2); Bronze Star; Meritorious Service Medal (4)

Lieutenant General (Brevet) Richard C. Nash (born 1950) was the 30th Adjutant General of Minnesota, having been appointed to that position by the governor of Minnesota Tim Pawlenty in 2010. Nash had previously served as commanding general of both US Army and multi-national forces including the US Army's 34th Red Bull Infantry Division, the Multi-National Division-South during Operation Iraqi Freedom, and the Multi-National Brigade-North (SFOR-14) in Bosnia Herzegovina during Operation Joint Forge.

His prior positions also include special assistant to the combatant commander, North American Aerospace Defense Command (NORAD), United States Northern Command, and assistant division commander (maneuver) for the 34th Infantry Division in Iraq.

== Education ==
Nash received a Bachelor of Science degree in health, biology and physical education from Minnesota State University, Mankato in 1972. He is also a graduate of the US Army War College and the United States Army Infantry School's Basic and Advanced Infantry Officer Courses.

== Personal history ==
Born in Minnesota on September 10, 1950, Nash spent his civilian career in construction management, working in executive positions at Hanson Spancrete Midwest, Maple Grove, and Fabcon, Inc. Nash retired from Hanson Spancrete Midwest as the vice president in 2004 in order to devote more time to his military responsibilities.

== Military career ==
Nash was drafted into the Army July 16, 1972, and after graduating from Mankato State University, he received his commission as a second lieutenant on April 11, 1976. His first assignment was as a communications platoon leader, Headquarters Company, 1st Brigade, 47th Infantry Division, in Stillwater, Minnesota.

He then served with 1st Battalion, 135th Infantry Regiment, in Rochester, Minnesota. There he served as a platoon leader and detachment commander for Company C, Battalion S-2 and Battalion S-4. Following his attendance at the Infantry Officer Advanced Course, Nash assumed command of Company C, 1st Battalion, 135th Infantry Regiment, and later moved on to serve as the battalion's operations officer (S-3). He continued in the operations officer role when he was transferred to 1st Brigade, 47th Infantry Division in 1989.

In 1991, Nash returned to the 135th Infantry Regiment, but this time to the 2nd Battalion as battalion commander. Upon his promotion to colonel, he assumed command of the 1st Brigade, 34th Infantry Division, out of Stillwater, Minnesota, until 1999, when he became the director of facility management at Little Falls, Minnesota.

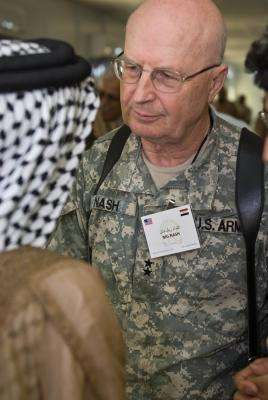
Major General Richard C. Nash, Commanding General, 34th Infantry Division, talks with a local Basrawi leader during an open house at Contingency Operating Base Basra, May 9. Photo by Pfc. Tyler Maulding.

On October 1, 2000, Nash was promoted to the rank of brigadier general and was promoted to assistant division commander (maneuver) of the 34th Infantry Division. From June 2003 to April 2004, Nash served as commanding general of the Multi-National Brigade (North) (SFOR-14) during Operation Joint Forge in Bosnia Herzegovina, and upon his return to the United States, he resumed his position as assistant division commander for the 34th Infantry Division.

On June 22, 2004, Nash received his second star. Along with this promotion to the rank of major general, Nash was appointed to serve as special assistant to the combatant commander of North American Aerospace Defense Command (NORAD) and United States Northern Command (NORTHCOM) and the command's National Guard Liaison.

In 2007, Nash returned to the 34th Infantry Division, this time to serve as the division's commanding general. Two years later, in February 2009, the division deployed for a year-long tour of duty in Iraq in support of Operation Iraqi Freedom. Nash assumed command of the Multi-National Division South (MND-South) (also known as Task Force Mountain), based at Contingency Operating Base Basra. The forces of MND-South primarily consisted of Iraqi Security Forces supported by the US Army's 34th Infantry Division. The primary mission of MND-South was to assist and support Iraqi security forces with security and stability missions in the area south of Baghdad ranging from Najaf to Wasit provinces extending south to Basra. Due to the departure of British and Polish forces from adjoining regions, Nash's MND-South was responsible for a much larger area of operations than previous forces stationed in the Basra region. The withdrawal of the Polish forces that had led the Multi-National Division Central-South (MND-Central South) forced the U.S. led Multi-National Division Center (MND-Center) to shift into areas formerly controlled by MND-Central South, leaving Nash's MND-South responsible for much of the area south of Baghdad that had previously been under the control of MND-Center. Then, as British forces prepared to depart from Iraq, on March 31, 2009, MND-South assumed responsibility for additional areas that had been controlled by the British-led Multi-National Division South East (MND-South East). After a highly successful deployment and highest ranking suicide in the MN National guard, the 34th Infantry Division returned to the United States in February 2010.

Nash remained commander of the 34th Infantry Division until November 2010, when Minnesota Governor Tim Pawlenty appointed him as the 30th Adjutant General of the Minnesota National Guard. As adjutant general, Nash oversaw the entire forces of the state's Army and Air National Guard units, which include the 34th Infantry Division, 34th Combat Aviation Brigade, 133rd Airlift Wing, 148th Fighter Wing, 84th Troop Command, 347th Regional Support Group, 175th Regiment Regional Training Center, and the Camp Ripley Training Center, in addition to numerous smaller and subordinate units. As adjutant general, Nash was the administrative head of the Minnesota Department of Military Affairs and he oversaw the day-to-day operation and management of the fiscal, personnel, equipment and real property resources of the Minnesota National Guard and Minnesota Department of Military Affairs.

== Promotions ==
Rank	Date Of appointment
2LT	11 April 1976
1LT	10 April 1979
CPT	26 May 1982
MAJ	19 March 1987
LTC	4 December 1991
COL	2 March 1998
BG	1 October 2000
MG	22 June 2004
LTG (bvt)	4 November 2017

== Decorations and badges ==
U.S. military decorations
Army Distinguished Service Medal
Defense Superior Service Medal
Legion of Merit (with 1 bronze Oak Leaf Cluster)
Bronze Star Medal
Meritorious Service Medal (with 3 bronze Oak Leaf Clusters)
Army Commendation Medal (with 2 Oak Leaf Clusters)
Army Achievement Medal
U.S. Service (Campaign) Medals and Service and Training Ribbons
Army Reserve Components Achievement Medal (with 3 bronze Oak Leaf Clusters)
National Defense Service Medal (with 1 Service Star)
Armed Forces Expeditionary Medal
Iraq Campaign Medal (with 1 Service star)
Global War on Terrorism Expeditionary Medal
Global War on Terrorism Service Medal
Armed Forces Service Medal
Armed Forces Reserve Medal with gold Hourglass device and 2 Mobilization devices
Army Service Ribbon
Army Overseas Service Ribbon
Army Reserve Components Overseas Training Ribbon with numeral 2.
NATO Medal
Minnesota National Guard Medals and Service Ribbons
Minnesota Commendation Medal with Pendant
Minnesota State Active Duty Ribbon with 1 Gold Star
Minnesota Distinguished Recruiting Ribbon with 2 Gold Stars
Minnesota Service Medal with Roman numeral XXXV

U.S. Badges and Patches
Expert Infantryman Badge
Air Assault Badge
