= Camp Lakeview =

Military installation in Minnesota, US

- Lake City, Minnesota in United States
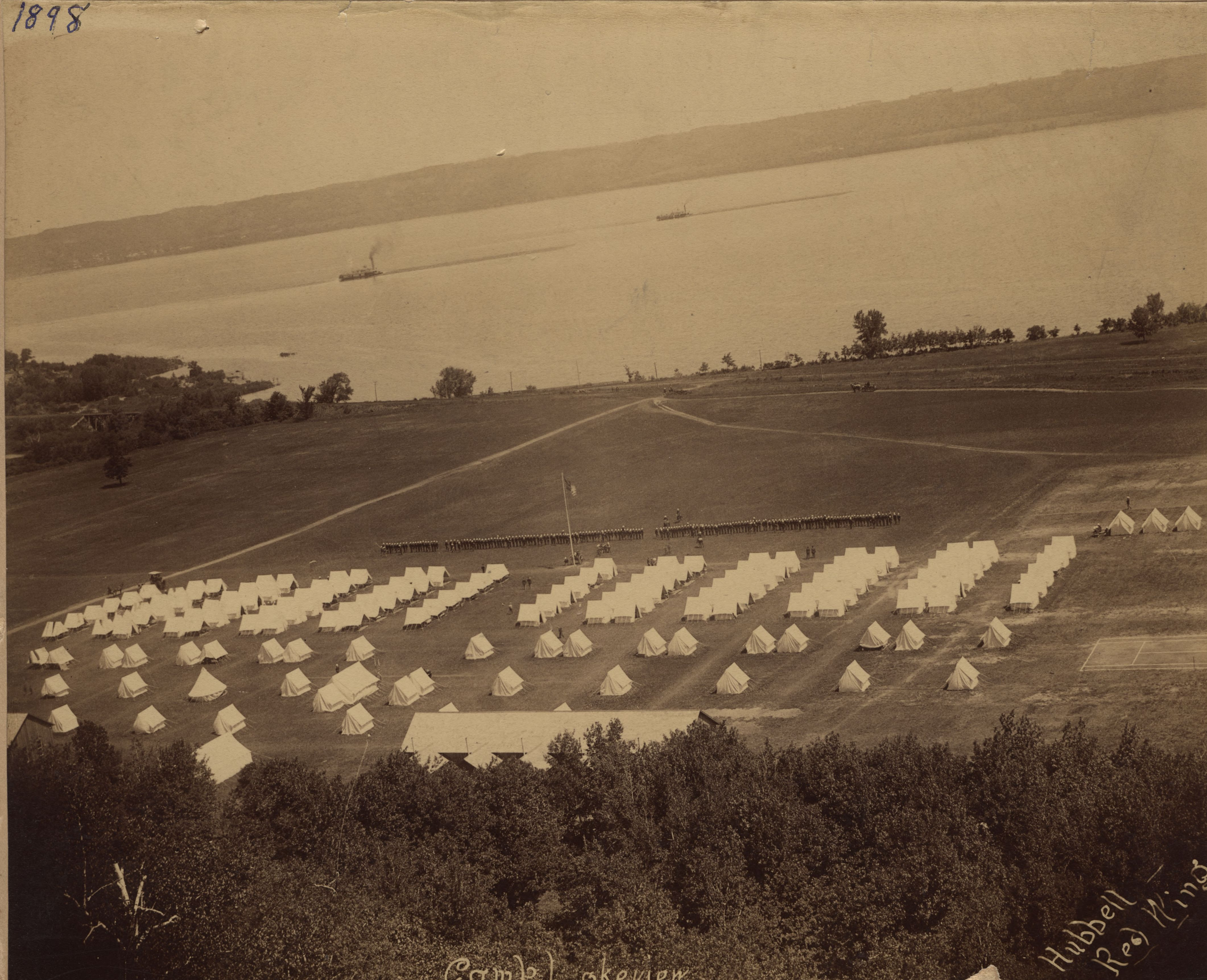
- Camp Lakeview in 1898

Location
- Coordinates: 44.4257°N 92.2420°W
- Area: 200 acres (0.8 km^{2})

Site history
- Built: 1888
- Built for: Minnesota National Guard
- In use: 1888–1930

Camp Lakeview was a 200-acre (0.8 km^{2}) military training facility for the Minnesota National Guard in Lake City, Minnesota, United States. Located on the shores of Lake Pepin, the area was first used as a military encampment in 1888.

== History ==
The land that would become Camp Lakeview was purchased by Lake City in 1888. The first use as a military encampment was later that year. An 1891 contract between the State of Minnesota and Lake City provided that the grounds would become the property of the state in 30 years if they were still being used for annual training.‍‍

By 1902, there were around twenty buildings on the site: hospitals, headquarters, officers' club, mess halls, and more.‍ The grounds had two rifle ranges which crossed each other: one 300 yards (300 m) and one 1,000 yards (900 m).‍ The facility was around 200 acres.‍

By 1905, it was acknowledged that Camp Lakeview was not large enough for the needs of the Minnesota Guard.‍ Proposals were brought forward to change the annual training site of the Guard to be in New Ulm. However, concerns were raised about the number of breweries in the city, and the "disgrace" that could be brought upon the soldiers of the state.‍

The Star Tribune reported that semi-annual artillery competitions between the Minnesota and Wisconsin National Guards might have included shooting cannonballs at each other over the Mississippi River.‍ A fire in 1926 caused $165,000 of damage (equivalent to $2.3 million in 2024‍) to a warehouse, field artillery equipment and 37 trucks.‍

Subsequent to the construction of Camp Ripley, the post was abandoned in 1930.‍ The last troops departed the camp on August 17, 1930.‍

=== Later use ===
From 1936 to 1942, the Civilian Conservation Corps Camp 713 operated on the land of the former camp.‍

As of 2025, the Lake City Sportsman's Club operates on the land.‍
