= Protests in Minneapolis regarding the trial of Derek Chauvin =

Local civil unrest in Minneapolis–Saint Paul

- Part of George Floyd protests in Minneapolis–Saint Paul
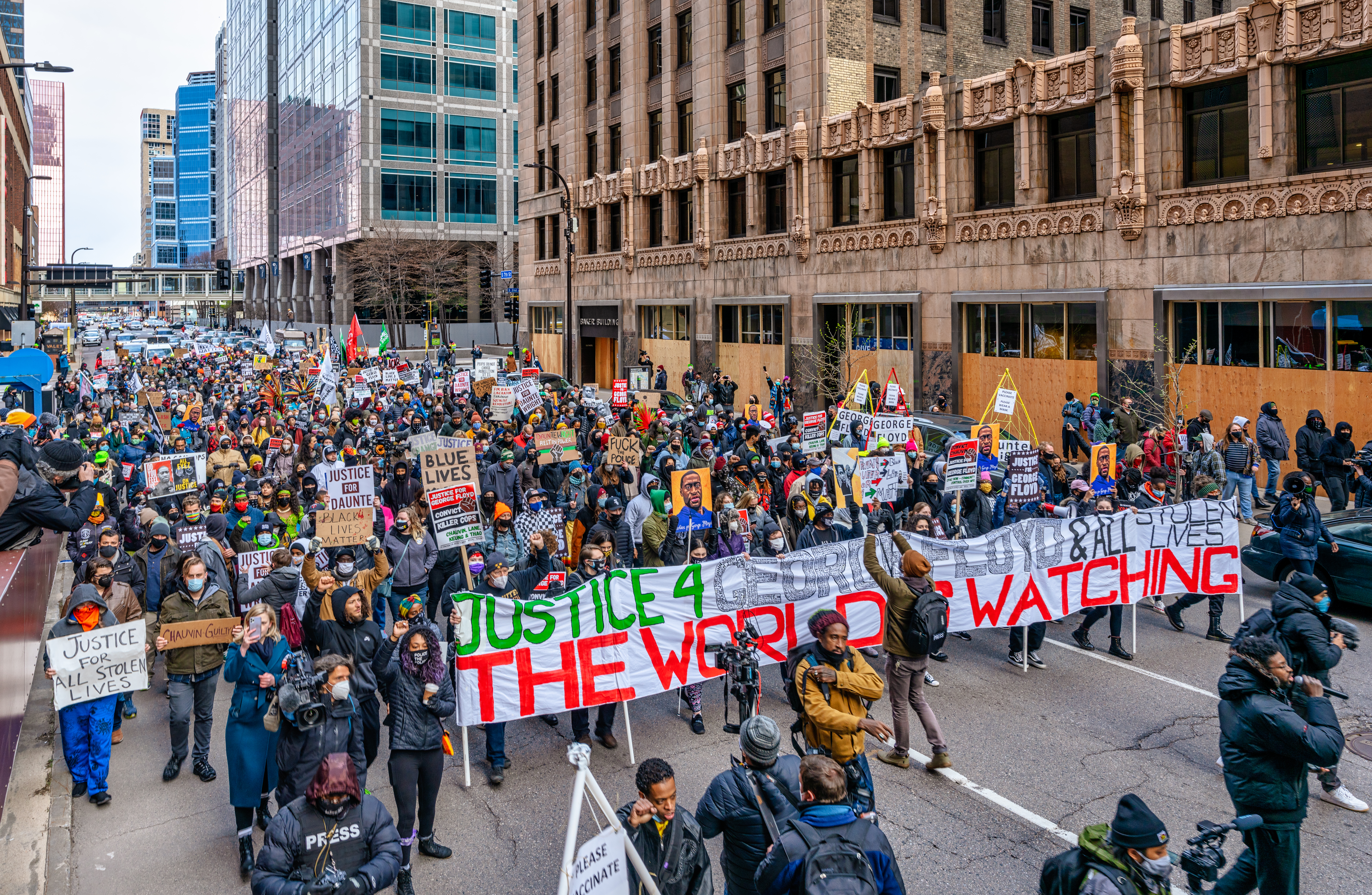
- Protest march in Minneapolis, April 19, 2021
- Date: September 11, 2020 – June 25, 2021 (9 months and 2 weeks)
- Location: Minneapolis, Minnesota, U.S.; several major U.S. cities; other global locations
- Caused by: Murder of George Floyd
- Goals: Charged with murder; No release on bail; Conviction at criminal trial; 30-year prison sentence; Police-reform measures
- Methods: Protests, demonstrations, civil disobedience, and civil resistance
- Result: Criminal trial concluded April 20, 2021, government demobilization April 21, 2021

Result
- Injuries: 2 Minnesota National Guard troops
- Arrested: 51 on October 7, 2020; 1 on October 15, 2020; 1 related to April 18, 2021, shooting
- Charged: At least 2

In 2020 and 2021, several protests were held in the U.S. city of Minneapolis that coincided with judicial proceedings and the criminal trial of Derek Chauvin. As an officer with the Minneapolis Police Department, Chauvin was charged with the murder of George Floyd, an unarmed African American man who died during an arrest incident on May 25, 2020. A bystander's video captured Chauvin kneeling on Floyd's neck for over nine minutes while Floyd struggled to breathe, lost consciousness, and died. Protesters opposed Chauvin's pre-trial release from jail on bail in October 2020. In the lead up to and during the criminal trial in early 2021, demonstrators sought conviction and maximum sentencing for Chauvin, and the enactment of police reform measures.

Local government officials surrounded a downtown Minneapolis courthouse building that was the venue for Chauvin's judicial proceedings with a temporary security barrier in anticipation of civil disorder. Demonstrations grew in size during Chauvin's criminal trial that commenced on March 8, 2021, and concluded on April 19, 2021. The court announced a guilty verdict on April 20, 2021, and several marches and rallies took place afterwards. Minnesota government officials spent $25 million to mobilize 3,500 National Guard troops and amass hundreds of law enforcement officers in security efforts they referred to as Operation Safety Net. Organized demonstrations in Minneapolis during the trial and verdict announcement were largely peaceful.

Protests and gatherings were also held in several major U.S. cities, and throughout the world, that coincided with the verdict announcement.

== Background ==
=== Murder of George Floyd ===
On May 25, 2020, George Floyd, an unarmed African American man, died while under the custody of Minneapolis Police Department officers Derek Chauvin, Thomas Lane, and J. Alexander Kueng, and Tou Thao. Chauvin knelt on Floyd's neck for over nine minutes while the other three officers assisted with the arrest and held concerned onlookers back. The Hennepin County medical examiner ruled Floyd's death a homicide and Derek Chauvin was charged with murder, and the other three officers who assisted in his arrest were charged with lesser criminal charges.

=== George Floyd protests in Minneapolis–Saint Paul ===
The murder of George Floyd, which was captured by a bystander's video that circulated widely in the media, inspired a worldwide protest movement against police brutality and racism. In late May and early June 2020, protests and riots occurred in the Minneapolis–Saint Paul metropolitan in reaction to Floyd's murder. Protesters demanded justice—by holding Chauvin and three other Minneapolis police officers who were at the scene of Floyd's murder accountable for their actions. On May 26, 2020, protesters gathered outside Chauvin's Oakdale, Minnesota, home. Over subsequent days, protesters demanded that Chauvin be charged with murder. Chauvin was fired from the Minneapolis police force and the first criminal charges were filed against him on May 29, 2020.

=== Trial of Derek Chauvin ===
Chauvin was charged in May 2020, and later convicted in April 2021, of second-degree unintentional murder, third-degree murder, and second-degree manslaughter in connection with Floyd's death. The criminal charges were filed in Hennepin County of the U.S. state of Minnesota. Judicial proceedings were held at the Hennepin County Government Center, a local government office building in downtown Minneapolis that included courtrooms.

== Events ==
=== In Minneapolis ===
==== Judicial proceedings ====
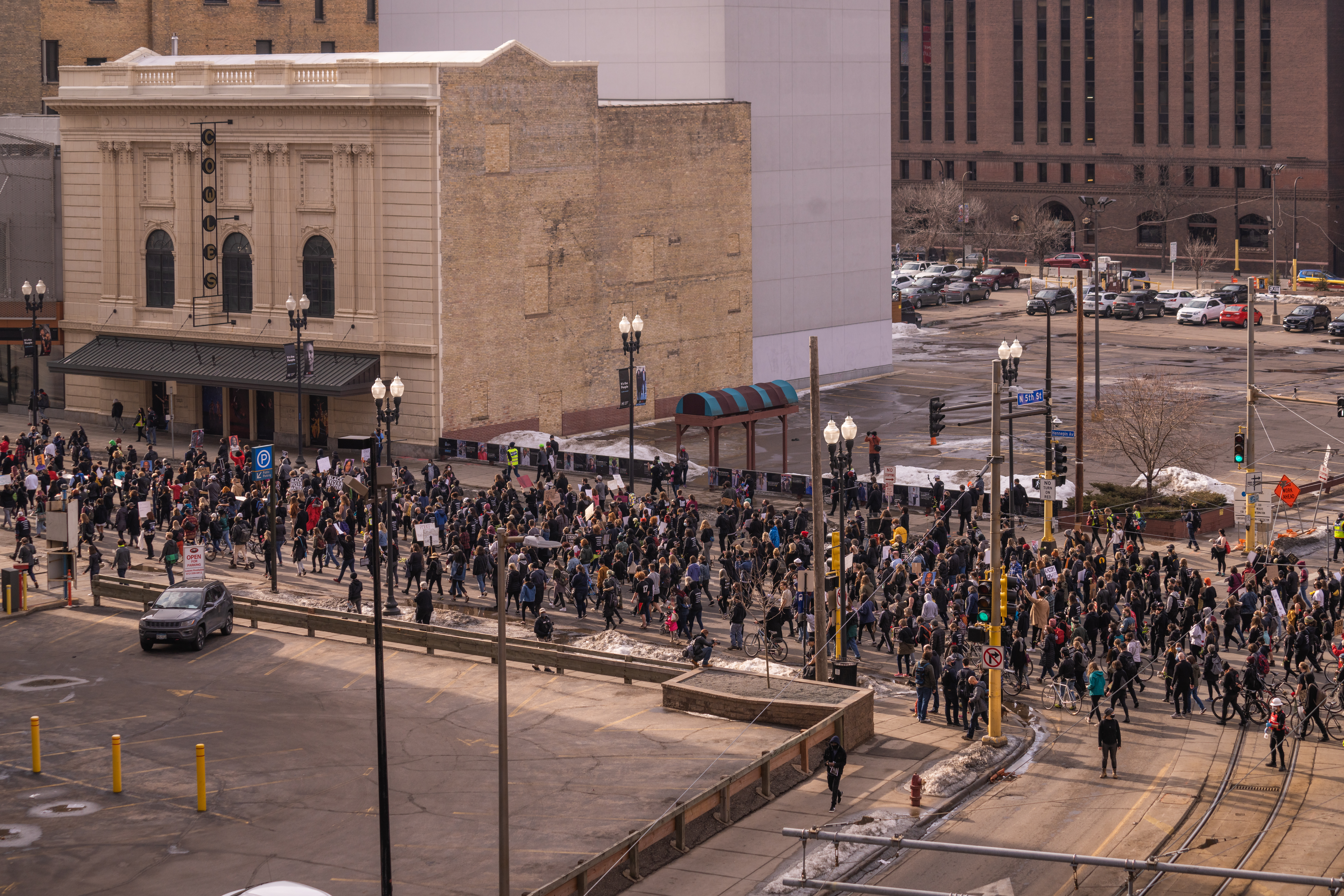
Protest march in Minneapolis, March 7, 2021.

Hundreds rallied outside the Hennepin County Government Center building on September 11, 2020, during a pretrial hearing for the former Minneapolis police officers Chauvin, Lane, and Keung, and Thao, who were charged criminally for Floyd's death. Confrontations between some in the crowd and the officers' attorney were described as "angry". On November 5, 2020, defense attorneys for the officers cited the exchange on September 11 and other safety concerns in their arguments in court to have a change of venue to another jurisdiction for the trial, but Peter Cahill, the presiding judge, rejected their motion.

On October 7, 2020, protesters took to the streets and held rallies at several places in Minneapolis to express anger over the release of Chauvin on bail. Chauvin was initially arrested on May 29, 2020, and held at Oak Park Heights prison, but he later posted bond for the $1 million bail for his release pending trial. Minnesota Governor Tim Walz sent 100 National Guards troops, as well as 100 Minnesota State Patrol officers and 75 Minnesota Department of Natural Resources conservation officers, to keep the peace in Minneapolis. Law enforcement made 51 arrests late at night on October 7, of which 49 were for misdemeanor offences such as unlawful assembly, one arrest for assault, and one arrest for having an outstanding felony warrant.

Protests were held on October 15, 2020, at the Hennepin County Government Center building during a court appearance for the four officers facing criminal charges related to Floyd's death. Thomas Wilder Moseley, a 29-year old from Blaine, Minnesota, gained entry to the building during the demonstration and was arrested for carrying a semi-automatic pistol. He was later charged and pled guilty to illegal possession of firearms.

Peter Cahill, the judge overseeing the Chauvin trial, dismissed the most serious charge for third-degree murder (it was later reinstated) on October 22, 2020, as a protest group of about 100 people demonstrated. Walz proactively mobilized 100 National Guard troops and an unspecific number of state patrol officers to support local law enforcement.

In early 2021, Minneapolis and Hennepin County officials spent $1 million on fencing and barricades for government buildings and police stations in anticipation of civil unrest during the trial. In February 2021, Walz deployed the National Guard for trial security and in the event of civil unrest, in response to requests from Minneapolis Mayor Jacob Frey and Saint Paul Mayor Melvin Carter.

On March 7, 2021, several hundred protesters marched in downtown Minneapolis and rallied outside the Hennepin County Government Center building to mourn George Floyd and call for reform of policing. The event, dubbed the "'I Can't Breathe' Silent March For Justice" by its organizers, came one day ahead of jury selection in the trial of Derek Chauvin slated for March 8. Protesters carried a white-colored replica coffin adorned with red flowers. Another group of faith leaders, held a "Pray for MN" gathering at the government center building later that afternoon.

==== Jury trial ====
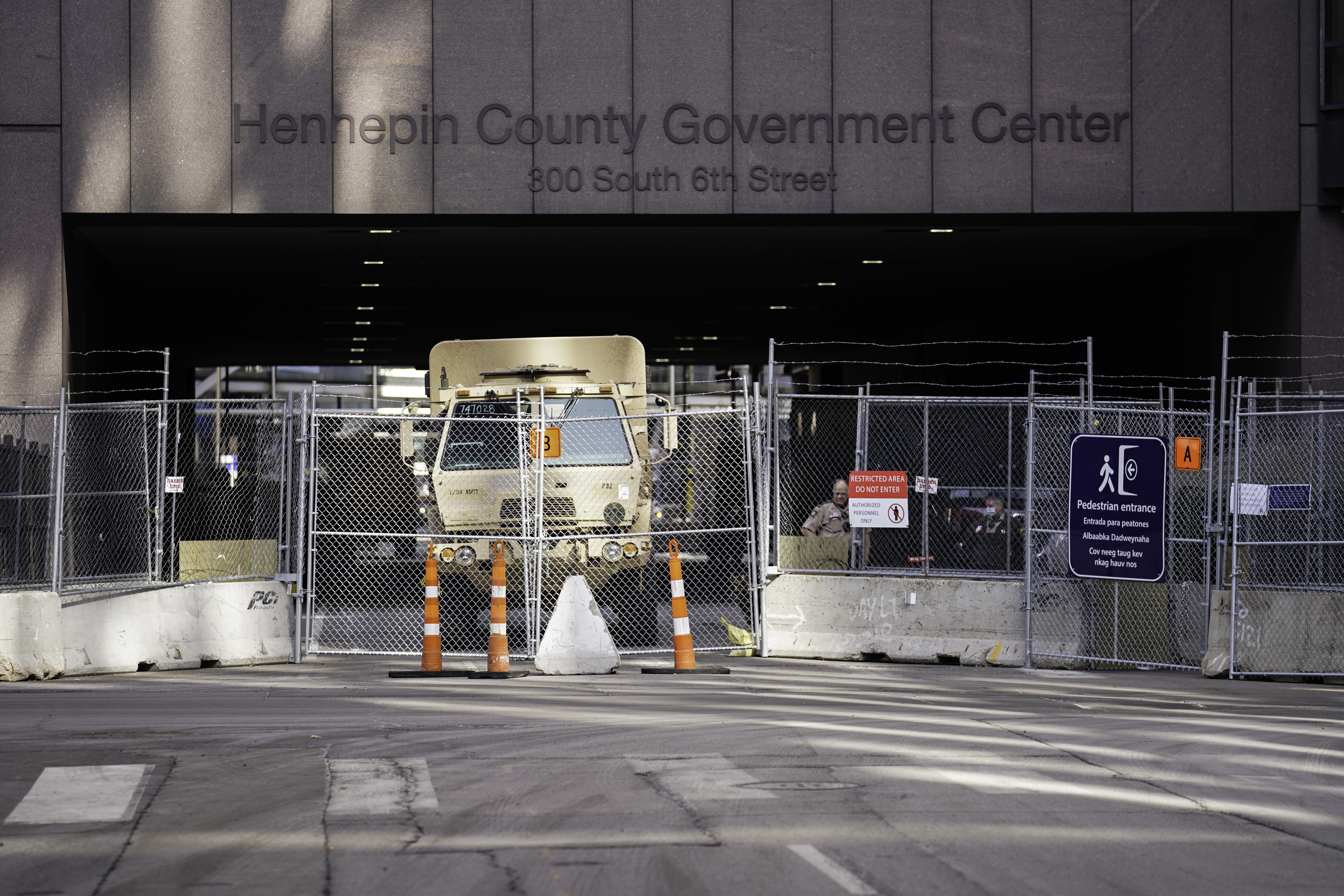
Security fencing and a Minnesota National Guard vehicle, March 8, 2021

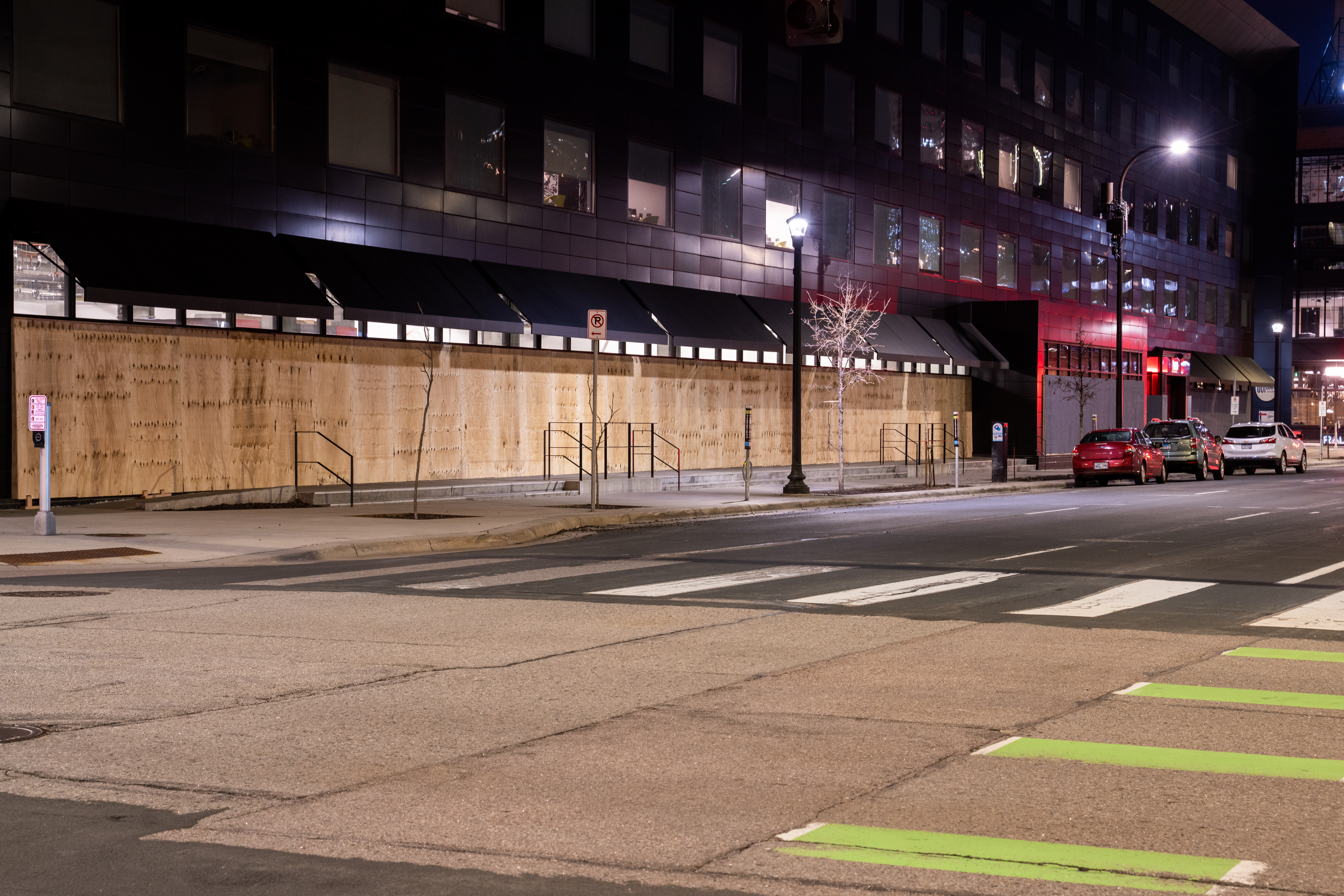
Boarded-up store fronts in downtown Minneapolis, March 26, 2021

Approximately one thousand protesters gathered peacefully outside a downtown courthouse as Chauvin's trial commenced on March 8, 2021, to call for justice for Floyd and raise broader issues of racial injustice. Officials had surrounded the facility with a temporary concrete barrier, metal fencing, and barbed wire in anticipation of potential unrest. Protests and rallies planned for the George Floyd Square were halted for several days after a fatal shooting there on March 6, 2021.

On March 28, 2021, the day before opening statements in the trial of Derek Chauvin, several rallies and protests were held in Minneapolis. The family of George Floyd and Al Sharpton hosted a vigil at the Greater Friendship Missionary Baptist Church in Minneapolis. Separately, protesters marched in downtown Minneapolis to demand justice for Floyd and rallied at the Hennepin County Government Center and Minneapolis City Hall, and some demonstrators parked cars on the Metro light-rail tracks, which closed train traffic for several hours. At 38th and Chicago Avenue, the intersection where Floyd was murdered, a group of people who self-identified as "anarchists" and "anti-fascists" held a training workshop at the square on how to avoid arrest and keep calm if detained by police. Protesters claimed that the street intersection was not public property and demanded that journalists leave the area before the training workshop began.

The George Floyd Square functioned as a gathering place during the trial of Derek Chauvin for people protesting racial injustice and seeking justice for Floyd. The square hosted daily visitors from around the United States who made pilgrimages to the intersection. Groups of protesters also gathered outside Hennepin County Government Center in Minneapolis during the trial of Derek Chauvin and marched on the streets calling for justice over Floyd's murder. The streets in Minneapolis, however, were largely empty of the mass marches that were a feature of protests in May and June 2020.

On April 6, several civil rights leaders, including Al Sharpton and former New York Governor David Paterson, led a rally outside the Hennepin County Government Center building and led prayers for the conviction of Derek Chauvin. The Chauvin murder trial concluded on April 19, 2021, and the jury began deliberations.

==== Brooklyn Center and Minneapolis unrest ====
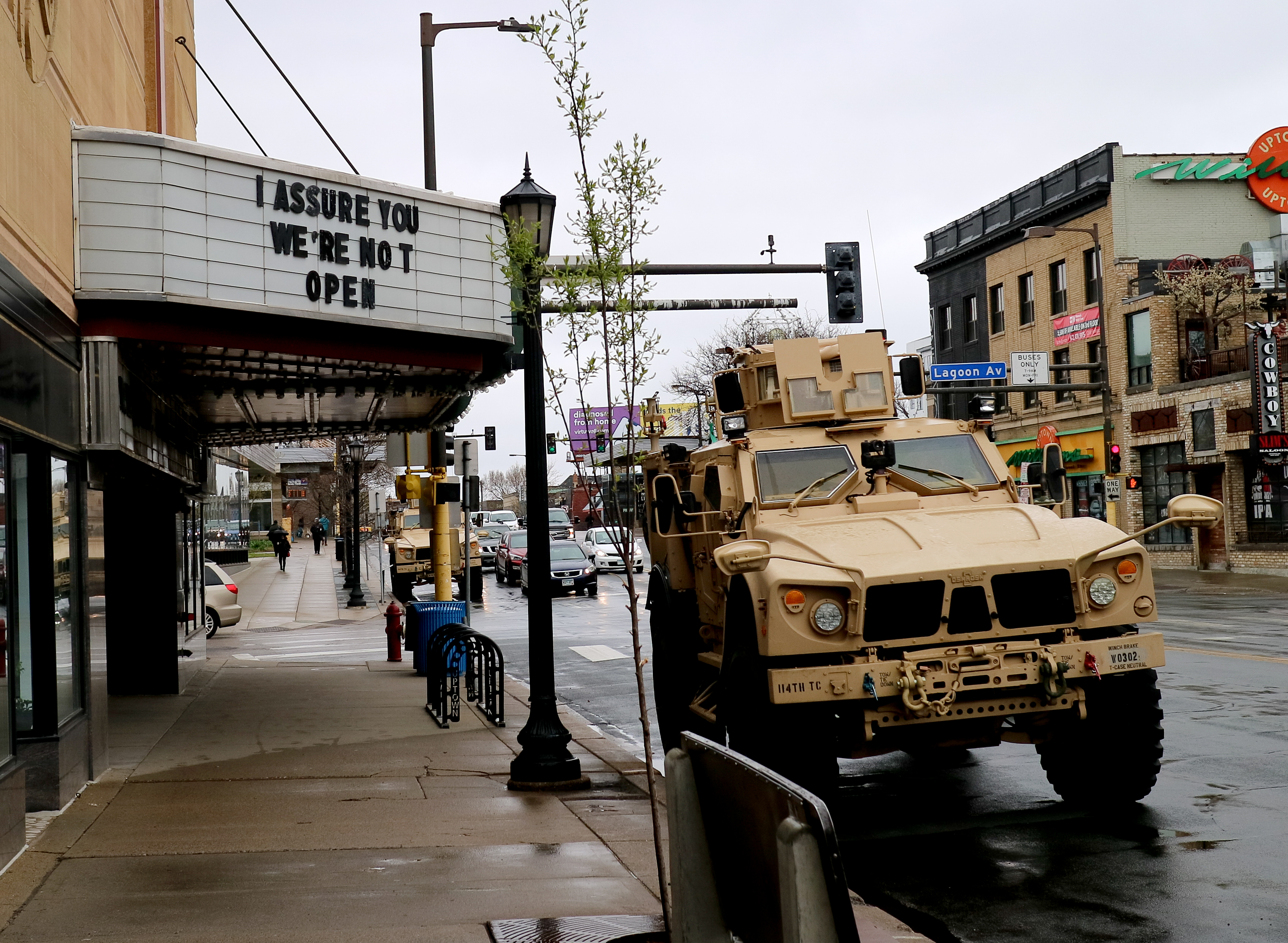
Minnesota National Guard M-ATVs in front of Uptown Theater on April 12, 2021

The killing of Daunte Wright, a Black man, by a police officer took place in the adjacent Minneapolis suburb of Brooklyn Center on April 11, 2021. Protests and unrest over Wright's death intersected with the looming verdict in Chauvin's criminal trial. A few days after Wright's death, visiting U.S. Representative Maxine Waters' told demonstrators in Minnesota that they should "stay on the street" and "get more confrontational" if Chauvin's trial resulted in acquittal. On April 13, members of the George Floyd and Daunte Wright families held a press conference outside the Hennepin County Government Center in Minneapolis.

Early in the morning on April 18, several gunshots were fired at National Guard troops in Minneapolis near Broadway Avenue. The troops had been deployed as part of Operation Safety Net, a planned government mobilization to prepare for and respond to potential unrest related to the Chauvin trial. A bullet struck a windshield of a military vehicle that held four soldiers. No one was hit by a bullet, but one soldier was transported to a hospital for injuries from shattered glass, and another was treated at the scene for minor wounds.

Twenty activist groups on April 19, 2020, coordinated a large demonstration and march through the streets in Minneapolis near the Hennepin County Government Center building. Protesters made several demands: lengthy sentences for the officers they deemed responsible for George Floyd's death, enactment of police reform legislation in Minnesota, to have charged dropped against demonstrators in Brooklyn Center and at other protest events, and for officials to end the Operation Safety Net mobilization and other government measures. Protesters and law enforcement authorities did not engage with one another and the April 19 event was reported as peaceful.

==== Jury deliberations ====
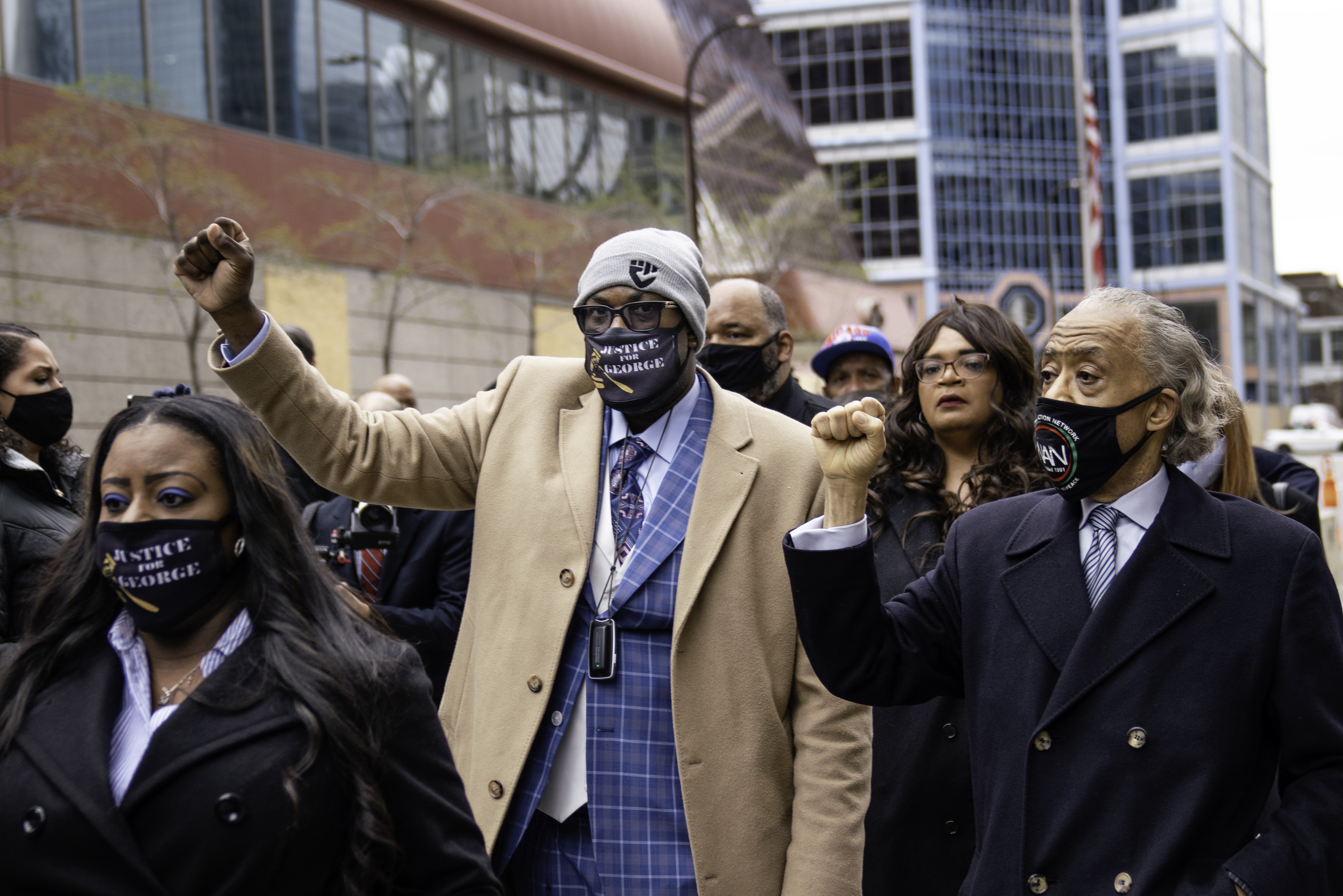
Philonise Floyd and Rev. Al Sharpton at a Minneapolis rally, April 19, 2021

The trial of Derek Chauvin concluded in Minneapolis just after 5 p.m. on April 19, 2021, and the jury began deliberations the same evening. The trial had been one of the most closely watched cases of police brutality in United States history. Walz declared a peacetime emergency and deployed 3,000 National Guard troops and hundreds of state patrol officers to assist local law enforcement. He also sought deployment of law enforcement officers from nearby states. Some schools in the Minneapolis metropolitan area announced plans to proactively move to distance learning and business had been boarding up out of worries of potential unrest.

Officials with the Operation Safety Net reported three business burglaries in Minneapolis and that a Minnesota Department of Natural Resources vehicle deployed for potential unrest was broken into and had a firearm stolen from it. Officials did not make any arrests connected to April 19 events.

In northeast Minneapolis, as the city was on edge awaiting the verdict announcement, a fire that began around 7 p.m. on April 19 destroyed the 100-year old Sacred Heart of Jesus, a Polish National Catholic Church. The church was located several miles from where peaceful protests were held the evening of April 19. The cause of the fire was falsely blamed on Black Lives Matter and "Antifa" activists in a social media post to Instagram that were flagged as misinformation by the parent Facebook company. After a several-months investigation, the Bureau of Alcohol, Tobacco, Firearms and Explosives said in September 2021 that the fire was the result of arson and they sought the public's held to identify a person of interest. An investigation of persons responsible and their motive was open in late 2021.

==== Verdict announcement ====
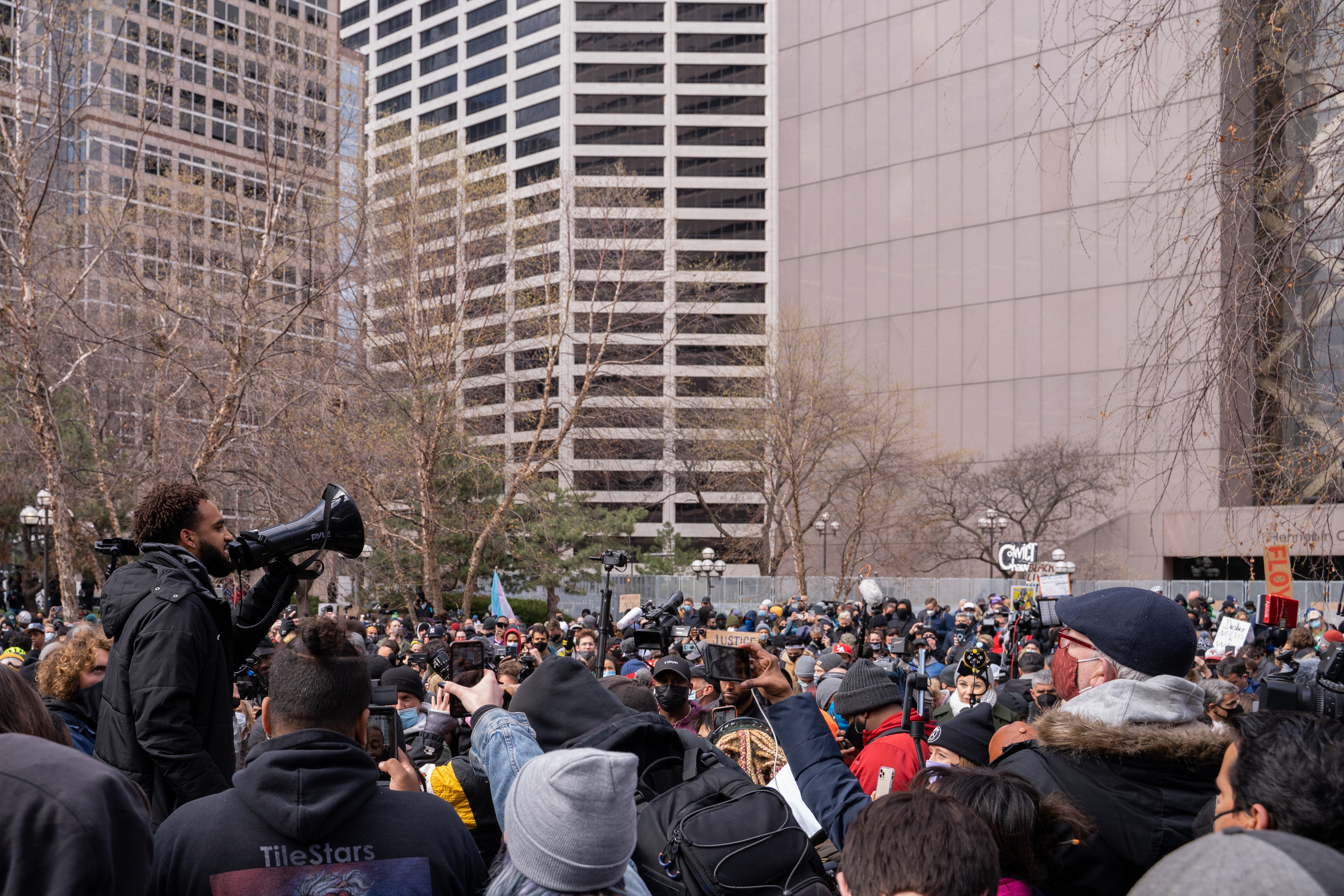
Crowd gathers for the verdict announcement in the trial of Derek Chauvin, April 20, 2021

Derek Chauvin was found guilty of murdering George Floyd on April 20, 2021. People gathered outside the Hennepin County Government Center where the trial was held and at the 38th and Chicago Avenue street intersection in Minneapolis where Floyd was murdered, to await the verdict at approximately 4 p.m. Crowds chanted in approval as the verdict was read that found Chauvin guilty on all charges. As news of the Chauvin verdict spread, thousands of people marched in downtown Minneapolis and others gathered at 38th and Chicago Avenue in elation over the outcome. Activists chanted, "One down! Three to go!", in reference to the looming trials of officers of the other three officers who participated in Floyd's arrest and subsequent murder. Protesters also called for reforms to policing and justice for other black men killed by police. Protest events after the verdict announcement occurred without incident and officials described them as peaceful.

==== Sentencing ====
People gathered at multiple locations in Minneapolis for the announcement of Chauvin's sentencing on June 25, 2021, when he received a 22.5-year prison term. The Star Tribune reported that crowds were smaller and more subdued than the jubilant celebrations in April 2021 when Chauvin was found guilty of criminal charges. Upon hearing of Chauvin's sentence, Floyd's family and civil rights activists expressed disappointment and said it should have been for the 30-year maximum, and they advocated for passage of the federal George Floyd Justice in Policing Act legislation.

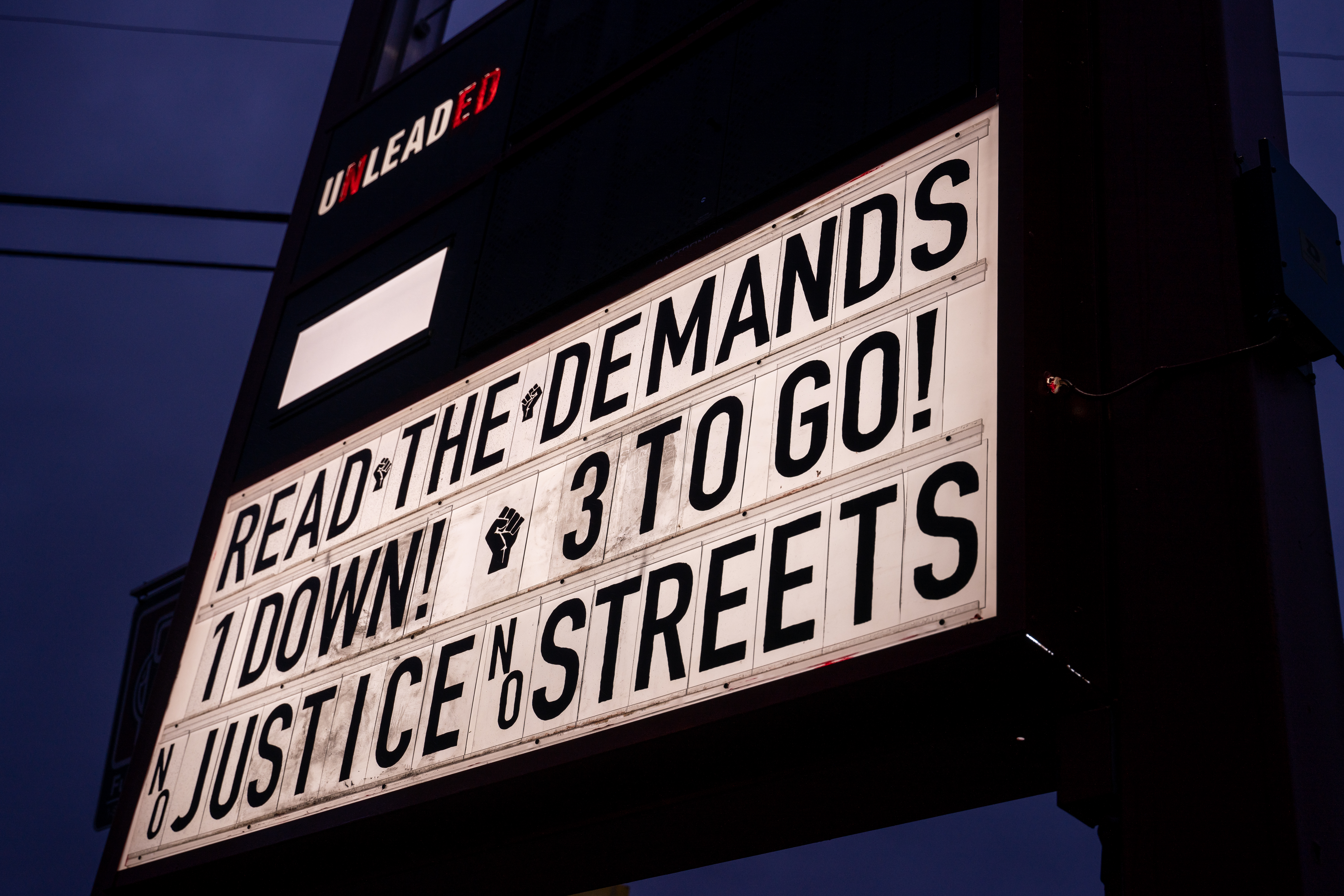
A sign at the George Floyd Square occupied protest, May 18, 2021

Several demonstrations were held in Minneapolis the evening of June 25, 2021. Protesters temporarily blocked vehicular traffic on downtown Minneapolis streets. Civil rights activists and protesters noted the forthcoming civil rights case against the four police officers at the scene of Floyd's death, and the criminal case against former officers Kueng, Lane, and Thao scheduled for March 2022, and their plans to continue protesting.

=== Elsewhere ===
Protests were held at several locations in the United States in conjunction with Chauvin's trial. Local officials in several major cities prepared for potential unrest, but events were peaceful as many who participated celebrated the announcement of a guilty verdict. The verdict announcement was celebrated by people gathering at events in European countries, South Africa, and other countries.

== Security measures ==
=== Operation Safety Net ===
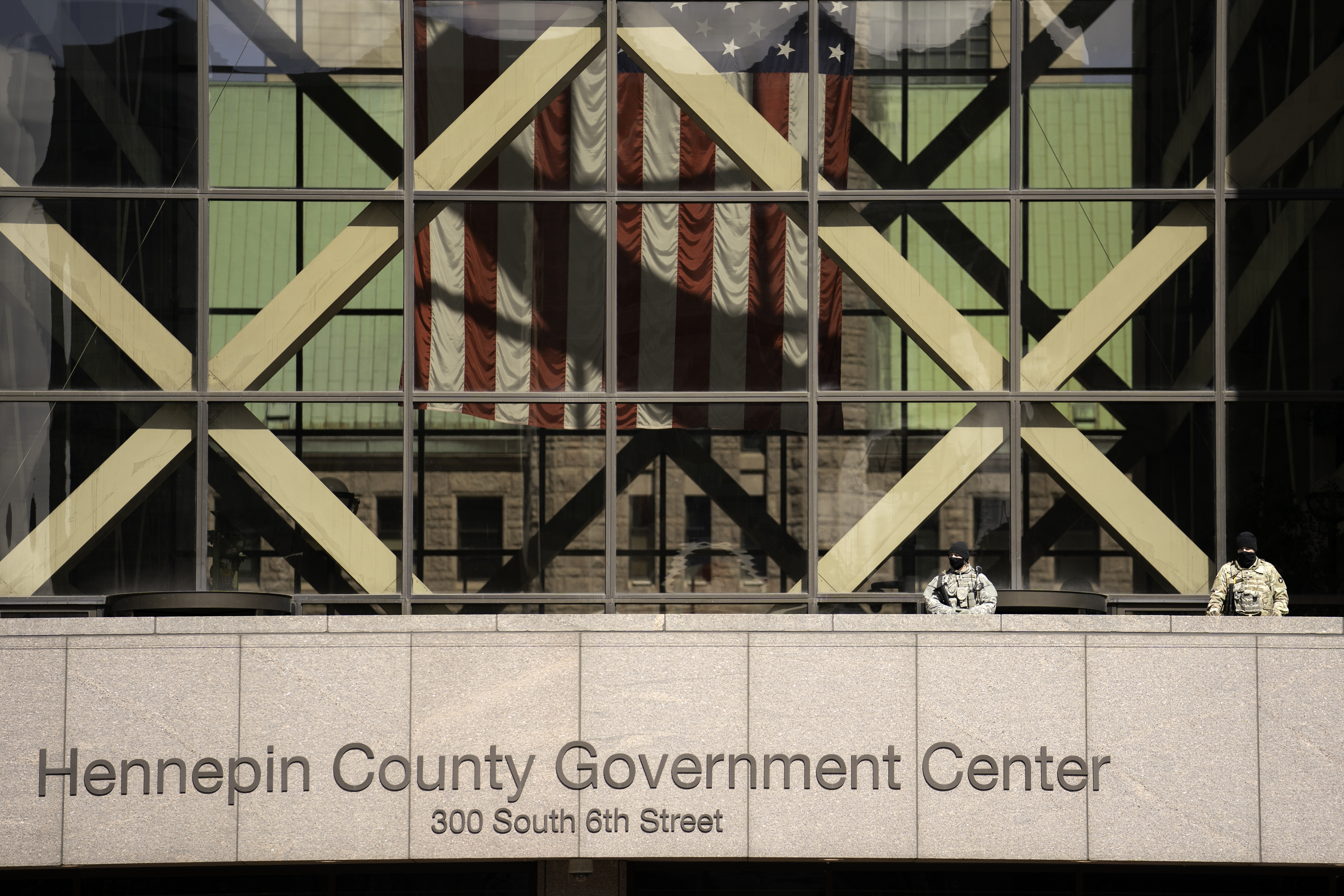
Members of the Minnesota National Guard at the Hennepin County Government Center on March 31, 2021

In late 2020, state and local government officials in the U.S. state of Minnesota began preparing for the possibility of continued unrest in 2021 with the trials of the four Minneapolis police officers deemed responsible for Floyd's death scheduled for begin that year. The pre-emptive government mobilization was a contrast to May and June 2020 when a massive law enforcement operation scaled up to respond to fires and unrest in Minneapolis and Saint Paul.

Minnesota state officials led a 12-week mission referred to as "Operation Safety Net" to amass law enforcement agencies and the state National Guard before, during, and after the conclusion of the jury trial of Derek Chauvin. Officials surrounded the Hennepin County Government Center, a public building that included the court rooms were the Chauvin trial would take place, with a temporary concrete barrier, metal fencing, and barbed wire in anticipation of civil unrest. Government officials said they did not prepare in advance for the contingency that Operation Safety night might intersect with unrest following another police shooting, as the killing of Daunte Wright occurred on April 11, 2021, which resulted in clashes between patrols mobilized by Operation Safety Net and demonstrators in Brooklyn Center and Minneapolis.

By its end, Operation Safety Net cost $25 million, most of which was for mobilization of 3,500 guard troops, but included costs to mobilize other law enforcement agencies. Roughly 120 law enforcement officers from the U.S. states of Nebraska and Ohio were also mobilized to the Twin Cities metropolitan area. Officials, though they encounter unrest in Brooklyn Center after Wright's shooting, encountered few issues during and after the Chauvin verdict announcement. Some residents felt the mobilization of troops and state patrols subjected residents to further trauma. Minneapolis officials spent approximately $1 million in contracts with seven community organizers to act as “positive outreach and support” during the protests and help deescalate potential tension between demonstrators and law enforcement. Hennepin County, which oversaw the courthouse where Chauvin was trial, spent $3.7 million for security measures.

On April 21, 2021, officials began demobilization of Operation Safety Net, a process that took several days. The security operation faced some criticism by advocates and Minneapolis residents for escalating tension and for resembling a military-style operation. Organized demonstrations that occurred in Minneapolis during the trial and that coincided with the verdict announcement were largely peaceful.

Documents obtained by MIT Technology Review show that teams formed for Operation Safety Net persisted until at least October 2021, and directed activities for other high-profile trials.

=== Federal warnings ===
Prior to the trial, federal authorities warned in classified briefings that extremists, such as white supremacist organizations and the Boogaloo movement could attempt to exploit peaceful protests to engage in violence. Officials also speculated that foreign intelligence agencies in Russia, China, and Iran could use the trial as cover for surveillance of law enforcement and government officials and to use proxy websites and online accounts to amplify criticism of the United States. The possible threats were part of the government security measures ahead of the trial. However, political unrest and violence did not occur during the trial or after the verdict.

== Aftermath ==
=== Demonstrator criminal case ===
Thomas Moseley, a 29-year-old man from Blaine, Minnesota, was arrested and charged by authorities for his role in several protests and riots in 2020. He twice had his bail paid for by the Minnesota Freedom Fund and was released from law enforcement custody. Authorities alleged that Moseley was responsible for vandalizing a Minneapolis police station on August 15, 2020, possessing unauthorized weapons and damaging property inside the Hennepin County Government Center building during a demonstration on October 15, 2020, and participating in a riot in downtown Minneapolis on December 31, 2020. The Minnesota Freedom Fund paid the $5,000 bail for the arrest on October 15, 2020, and the $60,000 bail for his arrest related to the December 31 riot. Mosely pled guilty to federal weapons charges in August 2021, stemming from investigations from his prior arrests at demonstrations.

=== Attack on the Minnesota National Guard ===
Andrew Thomas, a 28-year-old man with home addresses in Minneapolis and Chicago, was charged by the United States District Attorney's Office for Minnesota and by Hennepin County officials for shooting at Minnesota National Guard troops on April 18, 2021, that were deployed as part of Operation Safety Net. Thomas was charged by federal authorities with felony possession of a firearm. Hennepin County officials charged Thomas with first-degree and second-degree assault with a dangerous weapon and illegal weapons possession.

In July 2021, Thomas pled guilty in Hennepin County court for the drive-by shooting and illegal possession of a firearm. He received an eight-year sentence that included five years in jail and three years under supervised release.

== See also ==
- 2020–2021 Minneapolis–Saint Paul racial unrest
- History of Minneapolis
- List of incidents of civil unrest in Minneapolis–Saint Paul
- Police brutality in the United States
