= Minnesota Naval Militia =

- Active: 1899–1945
- Country: United States of America
- Allegiance: State of Minnesota
- Type: Naval militia

The Minnesota Naval Militia is the currently inactive naval militia of Minnesota. As a naval militia, the Minnesota Naval Militia served as a Navy and Marine Corps parallel to the National Guard, where, like the soldiers of the Army National Guard and the airmen of the Air National Guard, sailors and marines could serve in a dual federal and state role as state military forces answerable to the governor, unless federalized and deployed by the federal government. The naval militia served as an active component of the organized militia from 1903 until the end of World War II.

== History ==
=== Creation ===
The origins of the Minnesota Naval Militia lay with the outbreak of the Spanish-American War. The Minnesota Naval Militia was first authorized by the Minnesota Legislature, when in 1899, they authorized a state naval reserve open to veterans of the United States Navy who had completed at least one tour of duty. In 1903, after obtaining permission from the State Department and the War Department, two divisions were organized. In 1905, the legislature officially changed the designation of the naval reserve to the Minnesota Naval Militia, bringing it in line with federal legislation that offered support to state naval militias. In 1906, the Minnesota Naval Militia received the USS Gopher for training purposes.

The same year, a boathouse and pier were built near the yacht basin on the harbor side of Park Point to serve as a meeting place for the naval militia. In 1911, the naval militia used the USS Gopher to bring firefighters and supplies to fight a forest fire near Grand Marais, Minnesota. In 1915, a new 65-room National Guard armory was opened in Duluth to be used jointly by the Minnesota Army National Guard and the Minnesota Naval Militia.

=== World War I ===
During World War I, The Minnesota Naval Militia trained men and maintained chapters in Bemidji, Crosby, Duluth, and Pine City. The naval militia, under its commander, Captain Guy A. Eaton, traveled to Philadelphia where its sailors were integrated into the United States Navy command structure and deployed.

=== Inter-war period ===
Following the war, the Minnesota Naval Militia was reorganized with new units being created, with new members being members of the Minnesota Naval Militia as well as the United States Navy Reserve. In 1921, the USS Gopher was placed back under United States Navy control and sent to the Atlantic coast. In 1922, the gunboat cruiser U.S.S. Paducah was assigned to Duluth and used as a training ship, where it remained in service until 1940. In 1927, the U.S.S. Essex was brought to Duluth and used as a receiving ship until 1930. In 1932, members received updated training and were reorganized under the command of United States Navy officers. Before the onset of World War II, an aviation unit was added to the naval militia.

=== World War II ===
On December 3, 1940, the naval reservists in Duluth were activated. They embarked the USS Paducah from the Port of Duluth and landed in New York, where they received new assignments. Most would later serve on board the USS Ward in World War II. Seaman First Class Alan Sanford, a member of the Minnesota Naval Militia, fired the first American shot of World War II when he fired at a Japanese midget submarine from the USS Ward at Pearl Harbor the morning of December 7, 1941. Following the end of the war, the Minnesota Naval Militia was not reactivated. Its remnants were integrated and taken over by the U.S. Naval Reserve.

- List of naval ships named for Minnesota, Minnesota communities or rivers.

== Personnel ==
Naval militias are partially regulated and equipped by the federal government, and membership requirements are set according to federal standards. Under 10 U.S. Code § 7854, in order to be eligible for access to "vessels, material, armament, equipment, and other facilities of the Navy and the Marine Corps available to the Navy Reserve and the Marine Corps Reserve", at least 95% of members of the naval militia must also be members of the United States Navy Reserve or the United States Marine Corps Reserve.

== Legal status ==
The naval militia is recognized as a component of the organized militia of the United States under 10 U.S. Code §7851. Article 5, Section 3 of the Minnesota Constitution recognizes the Governor of Minnesota as the commander-in-chief of the naval forces of the state. Responsibility therefore for the reactivation of the naval militia of the state falls on the Governor's office through executive action.

== See also ==
- Minnesota State Guard
- Minnesota Wing Civil Air Patrol
