= Minnesota State Guard =

- The shoulder patch worn on the Minnesota State Guard uniform during World War II.
- Active: 1941–1948
- Country: United States
- Allegiance: Minnesota
- Type: State defense force
- Role: Paramilitary reserve army
- Size: 6,100 men (1942)

Commanders
- Current commander: Governor of Minnesota

The Minnesota State Guard, previously known as the Minnesota Defense Force, is the currently inactive state defense force of the state of Minnesota. The State Guard was organized with the purpose of replacing the Minnesota National Guard in protecting the state of Minnesota, while the National Guard was federalized and deployed during World War II. Though currently inactive, the State Guard is authorized under Minnesotan law and is recognized as a component of the organized militia of Minnesota, along with the Minnesota National Guard.

== History ==
=== World War I ===
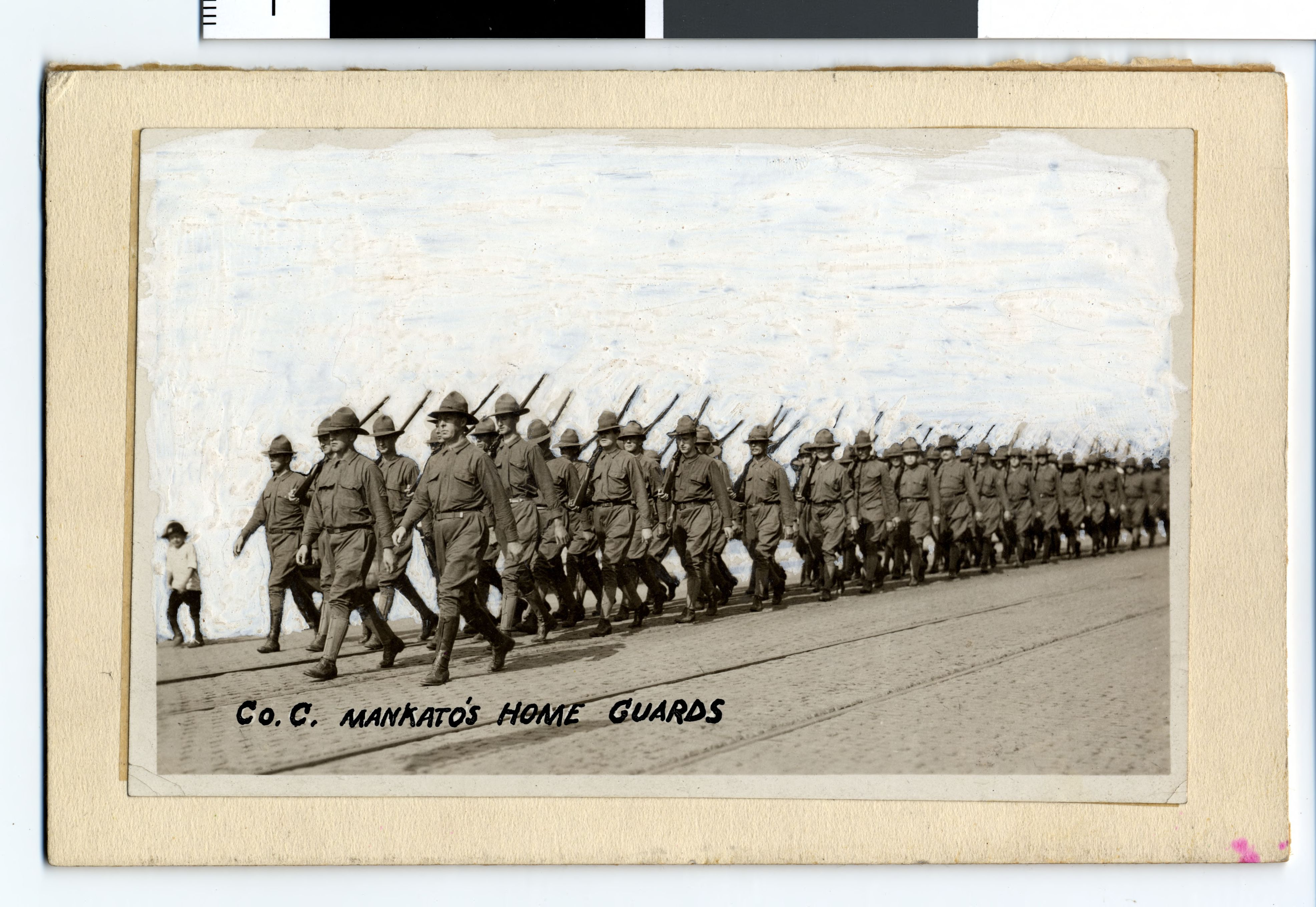
Company C of Mankato's Home Guards, 1917-1918

The state of Minnesota authorized and created state defense forces during each of the world wars. As a response to the United States' entrance into World War I, the United States Congress passed the Home Guard Act of 1917, which allowed the states to create home guards, which could receive surplus weaponry from the federal government. Minnesota's first State Guard, known officially as the Minnesota Home Guard, was created on April 28, 1917, and served for the duration of World War I. Over the course of the war, the Home Guard eventually consisted of 23 battalions with more than 7,000 men. The Home Guard included the Sixteenth Battalion, which was the first Minnesota-recruited African American military unit in the state's history.

The Home Guard handled a number of domestic emergencies. In late 1917, the Home Guard was deployed to restore order following riots in St. Paul. On July 1, 1918, a tornado struck the town of Tyler, and the relief effort was carried out by members of the Home Guard and National Guard. In October 1918, the Home Guard assumed management of the aftermath of the Cloquet fire. The remaining elements of the Home Guard were dissolved in December 1920.

=== World War II ===
In 1940, prior to the United States' entry into World War II, Section 61 of the National Defense Act of 1916 was modified to allow the establishment of state defense forces. The Minnesota State Guard was created in 1941. By 1942, the State Guard had reached a strength of approximately 6,100 members. By 1942, the First Separate Infantry Battalion of the Minnesota State Guard was placed on active duty, requiring prospective members to enlist for the duration of the war plus an additional six months. The battalion was responsible for providing full-time security for Duluth, Two Harbors, and the Thomson Dam in Jay Cooke State Park. In at least one event, members of the Minnesota State Guard competed in a rifle competition against students from the Shattuck Military School.

In 1948, two battalions of Minnesota State Guard, equipped with one dozen M4 Sherman tanks, were deployed to quell a violent strike by the meat packer's union in the St. Paul and Newport areas. After the violence was quelled, the troops withdrew from most of their deployed zones but continued to patrol the Wilson plant in Albert Lea, Minnesota.

== Legal status ==
State defense forces are authorized by the federal government under Title 32, Section 109 of the United States Code. Minnesota law also allows the creation of a state defense force.

== See also ==
- Minnesota Naval Militia
- Minnesota Wing Civil Air Patrol
