= Minnesota Wing Civil Air Patrol =

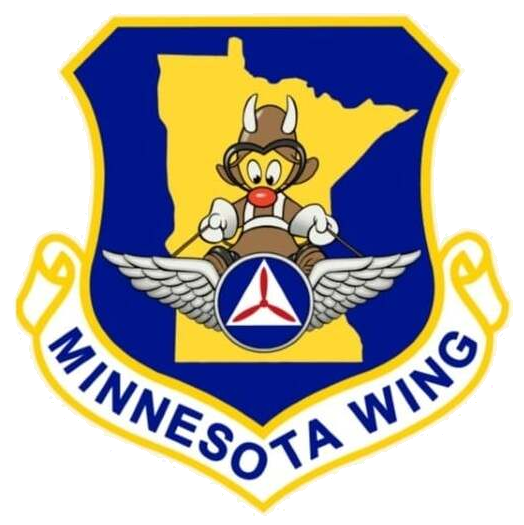
- Minnesota Wing of Civil Air Patrol

Associated branches
- United States Air Force

Command staff
- Commander: Col Jason Suby, CAP
- Deputy Commander: Lt Col Paul Prior, CAP Maj Jeff Rezak, CAP
- Chief of Staff: Maj Othelmo da Silva, CAP

Current statistics
- Cadets: 811
- Seniors: 789
- Total Membership: 1600
- Website: mnwg.cap.gov
- Statistics as of October 21, 2025

Minnesota Wing, Civil Air Patrol (MNWG) is one of 52 Wings (50 states, Puerto Rico, and Washington, D.C.) of Civil Air Patrol (the official United States Air Force Auxiliary) and helps fulfill Civil Air Patrol's core missions in Aerospace Education, Cadet Programs, and Emergency Services.

Minnesota Wing is headquartered in Inver Grove Heights, Minnesota. The Wing is divided into four Groups. Each Group is, in turn, made up of 4 to 7 Squadrons. Minnesota Wing currently has 23 squadrons located throughout the state.

== Aerospace Education ==
MNWG has been recognized nationally by National Headquarters CAP for outstanding performance with the Aerospace Education program.

== Cadet Programs ==
Most squadrons in MNWG include cadets (as either a Composite Squadron or a Cadet Squadron). North Hennepin Squadron in Crystal, Minnesota holds the distinction as being the first squadron in the nation to have a cadet program. Currently, there are 838 cadets in the Wing.

Minnesota holds an annual Encampment at Camp Ripley. Encampment is a 7- to 10-day cadet training activity that typically consists of more than 100 students and 40 cadet staff. Encampment is typically held in late June and early July and is targeted for new (typically, first-year) cadets in the program, as well as providing opportunities for advanced cadets seeking further training.

Additionally, a weekend of training focused on leadership known as the Minnesota Leadership Academy (MLA) is held each October at Camp Ripley for four days. It is divided into three schools, each specific to the rank and leadership level of the cadets attending.

== Emergency Services ==
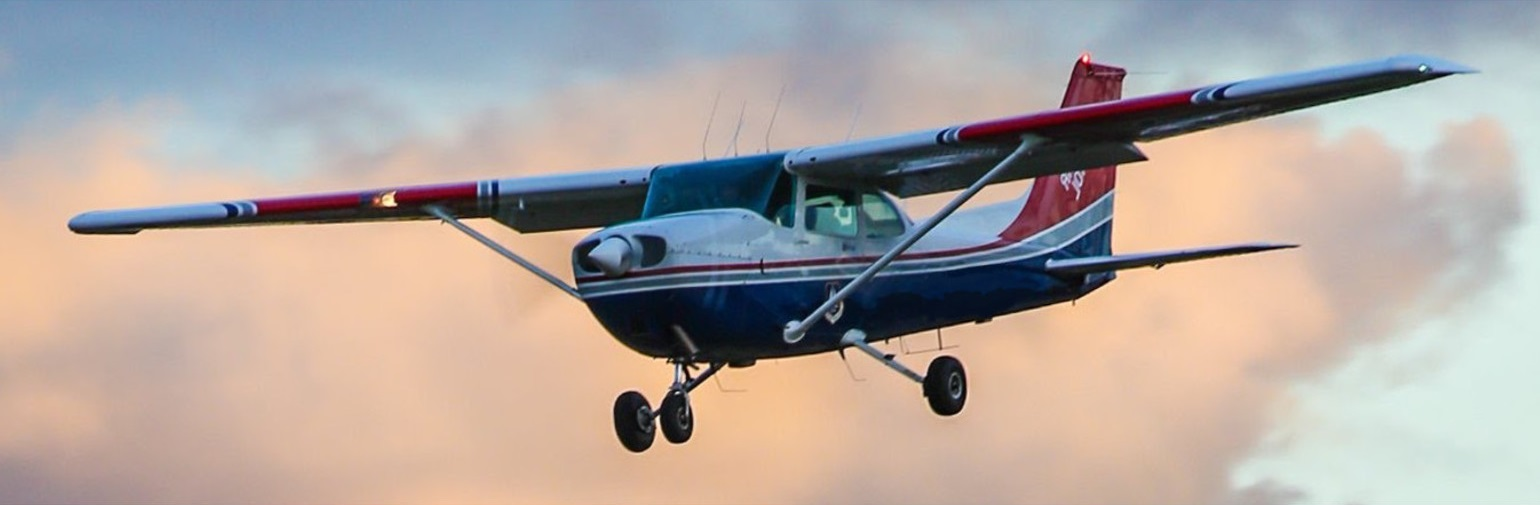
A Minnesota Wing Civil Air Patrol reconnaissance airplane

Minnesota Wing operates 19 aircraft (Cessna 172 and Cessna 182 airframes) along with trained ground teams to support operations in Search and Rescue, Disaster Relief, and Homeland Security.

== Legal protection ==
Employers within the borders of Minnesota are required by law to provide employees who are also members of Civil Air Patrol an unpaid leave of absence from employment when these employees are responding to a Civil Air Patrol mission, unless the leave would "unduly disrupt the operations of the employer."
