= Valhalla (disambiguation) =

Valhalla is an afterlife "hall of the slain" in Norse mythology.

Valhalla may also refer to:

== Places ==
=== United States ===
- Valhalla (Camp Ripley), the Minnesota governor's lodge at Camp Ripley
- Valhalla, New York, a hamlet and census-designated place
- Valhalla (Poolesville, Maryland), a home listed on the National Register of Historic Places
- Valhalla Canyon, in Wyoming
- Lake Valhalla, Washington
- Woden - The Valhallas, mountains in Olympic National Park

=== Elsewhere ===
- Mount Valhalla (Antarctica)
- Valhalla, a suburb in Centurion, South Africa
- Valhalla Provincial Park, in British Columbia, Canada
- Valhalla, a neighborhood established in Palestine in the 19th century by German Templers, now part of the Tel Aviv-Yafo municipal area
- Valhalla (crater), on Jupiter's moon Callisto

== Arts and entertainment ==
=== Film and television ===
- Valhalla (1986 film), Danish animated feature film
- Valhalla (2013 film), american/Canadian skiing and snowboarding adventure film
- Valhalla (2019 film), Danish dark fantasy adventure film
- Vikings: Valhalla, a Netflix series in production as at late 2020 (a spin-off from the Vikings TV series)
- "Valhalla", TV series episode, see list of Beastmaster episodes
- "Valhalla", TV series episode of Criminal Minds (season 6)
- "Valhalla", TV series episode of Deadliest Catch
- "Valhalla", TV series episode, see list of The Last Man on Earth episodes
- "Valhalla", TV series episode of The Umbrella Academy

=== Games ===
- Valhalla (video game), a 1983 ZX Spectrum game
- Valhalla: Before the War, a 1995 Amiga game
- Assassin's Creed Valhalla, a 2020 action-adventure RPG
- VA-11 HALL-A, a 2016 bartending simulation game developed by Sukeban Games
- An alternate name for Ragnarok, a 1992 MS-DOS game
- Valhalla, a story location in Final Fantasy XIII-2
- Valhalla, a multiplayer map in Halo 3

=== Music ===
- "Valhalla", a song by Pantera from their 1985 album I Am the Night
- "Valhalla", a song by Crimson Glory from their 1986 album Crimson Glory
- "Valhalla", a song by Blind Guardian from their 1989 album Follow the Blind
- "Valhalla", a song by Black Sabbath from their 1990 album Tyr
- "Valhalla", a song by Bathory from their 1990 album Hammerheart.
- "Valhalla", a song by Manowar from their 2002 album Warriors of the World
- "Valhalla", a song by Týr from their 2006 album Ragnarök
- "Valhalla", a song by Erra from their 2018 album Neon
- "Valhalla", a song by Skegss from their 2021 album Rehearsal
- "Valhalla", a song by Thirty Seconds to Mars
- "Valhalla", a song by Elton John

=== Other arts and entertainment ===
- Valhalla (comics), a Danish comic book series
- Valhalla (audio drama), a 2007 Doctor Who audio play
- "Valhalla", a short story by Gregory Benford about the possible fate of Adolf Hitler
- Valhalla, a sci-fi novel and trilogy (with Ragnarök and Guðsríki) by Ari Bach
- Valhalla, a novel by Tom Holt
- Valhalla, a ring name of professional wrestler Sarah Logan
- Valhalla (Blackpool Pleasure Beach), a thrill ride at Blackpool Pleasure Beach

== Businesses ==
- Valhalla Cinema, Sydney, a defunct arthouse movie theater in Sydney, Australia
- Valhalla Cinema, Melbourne, a defunct arthouse movie theater in Melbourne, Australia
- Valhalla Entertainment, an American television and film production company best known for producing The Walking Dead
- Valhalla Game Studios, a video game development, entertainment and holding company founded in Tokyo
- Valhalla Golf Club, a private golf club in Louisville, Kentucky
- ValhallaDSP, a digital reverberator and delay plug-in company

== Schools ==
- Valhalla High School (New York), Valhalla
- Valhalla High School (California), El Cajon

== Transportation ==
- Valhalla (steam yacht, 1892)
- Aston Martin Valhalla, an upcoming mid-engine sports car developed by Aston Martin
- Valhalla station, a railroad station serving Valhalla, New York

== Other uses ==
- HMS Valhalla (1917), a Royal Navy destroyer
- Valhalla Memorial Park Cemetery, a cemetery in North Hollywood, California
- Valhalla Swimming Hall, a swimming hall in Gothenburg, Sweden
- Valhalla IP, a football stadium in Gothenburg, Sweden
- Valhalla Museum, a museum of ship's figureheads in Tresco Abbey Gardens, Isles of Scilly, England
- Valhalla (youth portal), the Nordic Council of Ministers' portal for children and youth culture in Scandinavia
- Project Valhalla (Java language), an experimental OpenJDK project to develop major new language features
- Codename of Red Hat Linux 7.3
- Valhalla power supply, an upgrade to the original Linn Sondek LP12 turntable, made standard in 1982

== See also ==
- Valhall (disambiguation)
- The Valhalla Murders, a 2020 eight-episode Icelandic crime TV series
- Walhalla (disambiguation)
