= Minnesota State Veterans Cemetery - Redwood Falls =

State Veterans Cemetery in Redwood Falls, Minnesota

- Interactive map of Minnesota State Veterans Cemetery - Redwood Falls

Details
- Established: 2023
- Location: Redwood Falls, Minnesota, US
- Country: United States
- Coordinates: 44°32′20.299″N 95°02′51.883″W
- Type: Public
- Owned by: MN Dept of Veteran Affairs
- Size: 81 acres (33 ha)
- Website: Official
- Find a Grave: Minnesota State Veterans Cemetery - Redwood Falls

The Minnesota State Veterans Cemetery - Redwood Falls is an active cemetery east of Redwood Falls, Minnesota, United States. The facility includes an administration and maintenance building and a committal shelter designed by Bentz Thompson Rietow. Federal funds of $12-16 million were granted to build the cemetery. This cemetery, maintained by the State of Minnesota, includes the graves of many military service members and their family members. At full capacity, the cemetery should accommodate 20,000 plots.

The Redwood Falls cemetery was the fourth and latest cemetery constructed. Previous construction included the Little Falls cemetery, Preston cemetery, the Duluth cemetery.

== History ==
In 2012, plans began to establish a military cemetery in southwest Minnesota.

In October of 2019, Congressman Colin Peterson notified the Minnesota Department of Veterans Affairs of an initial $5.9 million grant to begin construction on their donated land.

In 2021, construction started on the new cemetery.

In the Summer of 2023, the cemetery construction was completed.

On 7 August 2023, the first veteran, Richard LeSage, was laid to rest in the new cemetery.

Twelve days later, the cemetery conducted its official opening ceremony.

== Notable Intments ==
- SP5 Richard LeSage (First cemetery interment [07 Aug 2023], Vietnam War, US Army)
- 2LT Arthur W. "Art" LeSage Jr. (WWII, POW - escaped German captors, US Army)
- Maj Gen William C. Norris (Air Force Cross/Silver Star/Distinguished Flying Cross, WWII/Korean War/Vietnam War, USAF)
- LCpl Henry Edward Schanck (KIA [03 Jan 1968], Vietnam War, USMC)

== Events ==
- Each May, Memorial Day programs honor fallen service members.
- Each December, Honor Wreaths are placed on gravestones.
