= Minnesota State Veterans Cemetery - Preston =

State Veterans Cemetery in Preston, Minnesota

- Interactive map of Minnesota State Veterans Cemetery - Preston

Details
- Established: 2015
- Location: Preston, Minnesota
- Country: United States
- Coordinates: 43.675°N 92.062°W
- Type: Public
- Owned by: MN Dept. of Veterans Affairs
- Size: 169 acres (68 ha)
- No. of graves: >1,000
- Website: Official
- Find a Grave: Minnesota State Veterans Cemetery - Preston

The Minnesota State Veterans Cemetery - Preston is an active cemetery. The land was donated by Fillmore County and the $10.7 million project was paid largely by the federal government.

The facility includes an administration and visitor building, committal shelter, and a maintenance building designed by Bentz Thompson Rietow. This cemetery, maintained by the State of Minnesota, includes the graves of more than 1,000 military service members and their family members.

The Preston cemetery was the second state cemetery. It was constructed after the Little Falls cemetery and was followed by the Duluth cemetery then Redwood Falls cemetery cemeteries.

== History ==
In 2007, State Representative Greg Davids proposed the construction of a State cemetery in Preston.

In 2012, Congressman Tim Walz held a congressional field hearing to garner input from locals.

In 2013, the cemetery construction began.

On 11 November, 2015, the first veterans, two former Preston mayors, were laid to rest in the new cemetery.

On 29 May 2016, the cemetery held its official dedication ceremony.

In 2019, the Preston cemetery won a best in the nation award after excelling in a National Cemetery Compliance Review.

== Notable Interments ==
- Cpl Edwin S. Caw, IMO (KIA April 24, 1945, WWII, USAAF)
- SP4 Gary L. Clancy (Author, Vietnam, USA)
- Capt Kenneth F. Dowell (Silver Star, WWII, USAAF)
- PFC Clayton E. Fishbaugher (POW, WWII, USA)
- TSgt Earl R. Hoff (Co-first cemetery interment, USAF)
- AO2 Clarence M. Quanrud (Co-first cemetery interment, USN)
- SSgt Harlan A. Welzel (D-Day, WWII, USA)

== Events ==
- Each May, Memorial Day programs honor fallen service members.
- Each December, Honor Wreaths are placed on gravestones.
