= Mount McCausland =

Mountain in Washington (state), United States

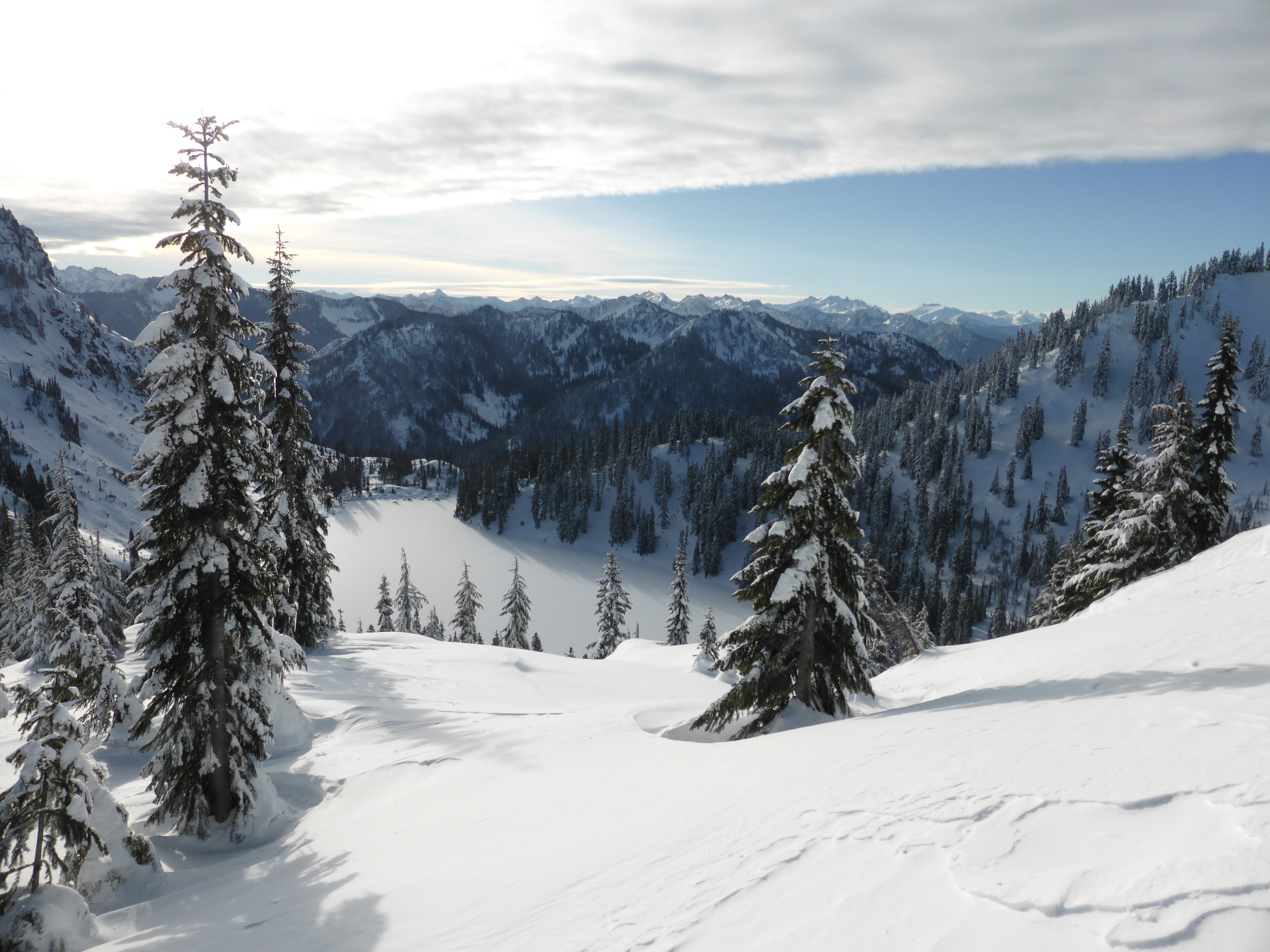
- View of Lake Valhalla from slope of Mount McCausland

Highest point
- Elevation: 5,741 ft (1,750 m)
- Coordinates: 47°47′48″N 121°06′12″W

Geography
- Location within Washington (state)
- Parent range: Cascade Range
- Topo map: USGS Labyrinth Mountain

Mount McCausland is a mountain in the U.S state of Washington located in the Okanogan-Wenatchee National Forest east of Stevens Pass. It's a popular hike that has views of nearby Lake Valhalla and Lichtenberg Mountain.

== See also ==
- Mountain peaks of North America
- Mountain peaks of the United States
- Lake Valhalla
- Lichtenberg Mountain
