= Walhalla =

Walhalla is the German form of Old Norse Valhöll, which is commonly anglicised as Valhalla. It may refer to:

- Walhalla (memorial), a hall of fame in Donaustauf, Bavaria, Germany.

== Places ==
=== Australia ===
- Walhalla, Victoria, Australia
- Electoral district of Walhalla, a former electoral district of the Victorian Legislative Assembly

=== United States ===
- Walhalla, California, former name of Gualala, California
- Walhalla, Michigan
- Walhalla Township, Lake of the Woods County, Minnesota
- Walhalla, North Dakota
- Walhalla Ravine, in the Clintonville neighborhood of Columbus, Ohio
- Walhalla, South Carolina
- Walhalla, Texas

== Other uses ==
- 1260 Walhalla, a minor planet
- Hotel Walhalla, Osnabrück, Lower Saxony, Germany
- Walhalla (film), a 1995 Dutch thriller
- Walhalla IP, a former football stadium in Gothenburg, Sweden
- Walhalla-orden, a Finnish secret society founded 1783
- "Walhalla", a track by the Dutch trance act Gouryella
- Walhalla (typeface)

== See also ==
- Valhall (disambiguation)
- Valhalla (disambiguation)
