= USS Minneapolis–Saint Paul (SSN-708) =

Los Angeles-class nuclear-powered attack submarine of the US Navy

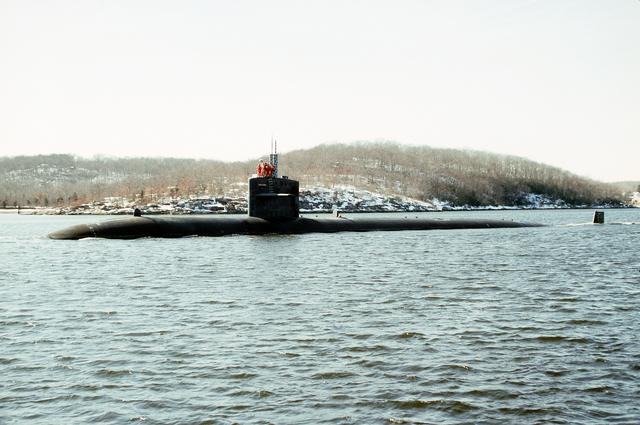
- USS Minneapolis–Saint Paul (SSN-708)

History

United States
- Name: Minneapolis-Saint Paul
- Namesake: Minneapolis-Saint Paul, Minnesota
- Ordered: 31 October 1973
- Laid down: 20 January 1981
- Launched: 19 March 1983
- Commissioned: 10 March 1984
- Decommissioned: 28 August 2008
- Out of service: 22 June 2007
- Stricken: 28 August 2008
- Home port: Pearl Harbor, HI
- Fate: Completed recycling as of 30 November 2021

General characteristics
- Class & type: Los Angeles-class submarine
- Displacement: 5,695 tons light; 6,068 tons full; 373 tons dead
- Length: 110.3 m (361 ft 11 in)
- Beam: 10.0 m (32 ft 10 in)
- Draft: 9.7 m (31 ft 10 in)
- Propulsion: 1 × S6G reactor
- Range: Unlimited distance; 20–25 years
- Complement: 12 officers, 98 enlisted

USS Minneapolis–Saint Paul (SSN-708) was a Los Angeles-class submarine. She was the first vessel of the United States Navy to be named for the metropolitan area of Minneapolis-Saint Paul, Minnesota, although each city had been honored twice before. The contract to build her was awarded to the Electric Boat Division of General Dynamics Corporation in Groton, Connecticut on 31 October 1973 and her keel was laid down on 20 January 1981. She was launched on 19 March 1983 sponsored by Mrs. Penny Durenberger (wife of Senator David Durenberger), and commissioned on 10 March 1984, with Commander Ralph Schlichter in command.

While Minneapolis–Saint Paul was the first vessel named for the Twin Cities as a whole, she is the third ship to be named for Minneapolis as well as the third to be named for Saint Paul. Many ships were given other Minnesota-related names.

== History ==
Minneapolis–Saint Paul took part in Operation Desert Shield and the Gulf War and was the first submarine to carry Tomahawk missiles specifically designated for use in strikes against Iraq during the Gulf War.

Four crew members were washed overboard by heavy waves on 29 December 2006 in Plymouth Sound, England, as the ship was exiting HMNB Devonport on the surface following a port call. This resulted in the deaths of Senior Chief Petty Officer Thomas Higgins (Chief of the Boat) and Sonar Technician (Submarines) 2nd Class Michael Holtz. After the preliminary investigation, Commander Edwin Ruff, the commanding officer, received a punitive letter of reprimand and was relieved of command.

Minneapolis–Saint Paul conducted inter-fleet transfer from Norfolk, Virginia, to Puget Sound Naval Shipyard, Bremerton, Washington, in July 2007 for decommissioning. Custody of Minneapolis-Saint Paul was transferred to Puget Sound Naval Shipyard in August 2008. In 2022, the submarine's sail and rudder were shipped to Minnesota and are undergoing restoration at the Minnesota Military & Veterans Museum for display at their new facility in 2025.

On 27 June 2025 the sail was placed at the Camp Ripley site and welded together.
