= USS Minneapolis–Saint Paul =

Two ships of the United States Navy have been named for the metropolitan area of Minneapolis–Saint Paul in Minnesota, encompassing the cities of Saint Paul and Minneapolis:

- USS Minneapolis–Saint Paul (SSN-708), the twenty-first Los Angeles-class submarine, in commission from 1984 to 2008
- USS Minneapolis–Saint Paul (LCS-21) is the eleventh Freedom-class littoral combat ship, currently in commission.

== See also ==
- USS Minneapolis
- USS Saint Paul
