= Russell P. Hartle =

United States Army general

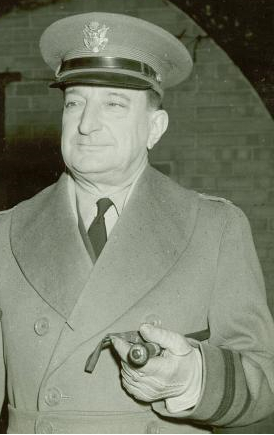
- Born: June 26, 1889; Chewsville, Maryland
- Died: November 23, 1961 (aged 72); Bethesda, Maryland
- Burial place: Rose Hill Cemetery, Hagerstown, Maryland
- Military career
- Allegiance: United States
- Branch: United States Army
- Service years: 1910–1946
- Rank: Major General
- Nickname: "Scrappy"
- Service number: 0-2914
- Unit: Infantry Branch
- Commands: V Corps; 34th Infantry Division; 64th Infantry Regiment; 31st Infantry Regiment
- Conflicts: Philippine–American War; Border War; World War I World War II
- Awards: Army Distinguished Service Medal; Legion of Merit

Major General Russell Peter Hartle (June 26, 1889 – November 23, 1961) was a senior United States Army officer who fought in World War I and World War II, where he commanded the 34th Infantry Division and V Corps in the European Theater of Operations.

== Early life and military career ==
Hartle graduated from St. John's College, Annapolis, Maryland, in 1910, and received a commission as a second lieutenant into the Infantry Branch of the United States Army in the same year. Soon thereafter, he was sent to the Philippine Islands as the American military government was still attempting to stabilize the country nine years after the end of the Philippine–American War, yet still in turmoil due in large part to the Moro Rebellion.

In 1912, Hartle served with the 10th Infantry Regiment, then at Fort Douglas, Utah. From 1913 to 1916, he served with the 20th Infantry Regiment on the United States border with Mexico during the Mexican Border War.

During World War I, Hartle served as a captain in the 13th Infantry Division as it was preparing to leave for France in 1919. After World War I, he was a professor of Military Science and Tactics at Utah Agricultural College (now Utah State University).

== Between the wars ==
Hartle graduated from the Army Infantry School in 1924, the United States Army Command and General Staff School in 1925, and the United States Army War College in 1930. He returned to the Philippines in 1930, was promoted to the rank of major, and went on to Shanghai in 1932, as senior battalion commander of the 31st Infantry, under orders to protect American lives and property as the Japanese invaded China.

In 1934, Hartle graduated from the Naval War College, and from 1934 to 1938, he served as a member of the War Plans Division of the War Department General Staff. Hartle was the first person to graduate from both the Army and Naval War Colleges. During that time he received a promotion to the rank of lieutenant colonel on July 13, 1935.

Promoted to the rank of colonel on August 15, 1939, Hartle commanded the 65th Infantry Regiment in Puerto Rico from 1939 to August 1941. His mission was to pull together American and Puerto Rican forces and prepare them to defend the Caribbean and eastern coast of the United States from any Axis aggression. In October 1940, while serving as commander of the mobile forces of Puerto Rico, Hartle was promoted to the temporary one-star general officer rank of brigadier general.

In April 1941, war plan RAINBOW 5 was issued to counter further military assault by Germany against England. On August 5, 1941, Hartle was promoted to the two-star rank of major general and placed in command of the 34th Infantry Division, an Army National Guard formation, while the 34th was on maneuvers in Louisiana.

== World War II ==
Following the Japanese attack on Pearl Harbor on December 7, 1941, and the German declaration of war against the United States on December 11, 1941, war plan MAGNET Force was activated. Pursuant to that war plan, in January 1942, the 34th Division under Hartle's command was the first United States division shipped overseas–to Northern Ireland to begin the European Theater of Operations.

In the spring of 1942, Hartle recommended his aide-de-camp, artillery Captain William O. Darby, to organize and train the first modern-day United States Army Ranger unit, the 1st Ranger Battalion. The recommendation was authorized by General George C. Marshall, the United States Army Chief of Staff, in May 1942.

On May 20, 1942, Hartle was promoted to the command of V Corps under Major General James E. Chaney, who commanded United States Army Forces in the United Kingdom. Hartle continued to serve in that capacity under Lieutenant General Dwight D. Eisenhower from June 15 to October 24, 1942.

On November 2, 1942, Hartle became Deputy Commander of American troops in the ETOUSA. Hartle commanded V Corps until his reassignment effective July 7, 1943, to Headquarters, Army Ground Forces, Washington D.C. On July 17, 1943, Hartle was reassigned to Camp Fannin, Texas, to train replacement troops. The exact reason for the reassignment is unclear; however, it was most likely due to Marshall's dissatisfaction with Hartle as a potential battlefield commander. Marshall was believed to keep a "little black book" containing the names of key officers he deemed worthy of battlefield command. It is possible that Hartle just did not make it into the book. Major General Hartle retired from the army with a physical disability on June 30, 1946, while living in Tyler, Texas.

For his services during the war, and in particular during the period from April 1942 to March 1943, Hartle was awarded the Army Distinguished Service Medal, the citation for which reads:

The President of the United States of America, authorized by Act of Congress July 9, 1918, takes pleasure in presenting the Army Distinguished Service Medal to Major General Russell P. Hartle (ASN: 0-2914), United States Army, for exceptionally meritorious and distinguished services to the Government of the United States, in a duty of great responsibility during the period from April 1942 to March 1943. The singularly distinctive accomplishments of General Hartle reflect the highest credit upon himself and the United States Army.

== Postwar ==
Upon his retirement from the military, Hartle returned to Washington County, Maryland.

On December 14, 1945, at the Scottish Rite Temple, in Wichita, Kansas, Hartle was awarded his 33rd Degree Rank of Freemasonry.

In 1950, Hartle made an unsuccessful run as a Democrat to become Congressman for the 6th Congressional District of Maryland.

Hartle died on November 23, 1961, at the age of 72 in Bethesda, Maryland, and was buried in Rose Hill Cemetery, Hagerstown, Maryland.

== Medals and decorations ==
Army Distinguished Service Medal
Legion of Merit
Mexican Border Service Medal
World War I Victory Medal
Army of Occupation of Germany Medal
American Defense Service Medal
American Campaign Medal
European–African–Middle Eastern Campaign Medal with one service star
World War II Victory Medal

Military offices
Preceded by Ellard A. Walsh	Commanding General 34th Infantry Division; 1941–1942	Succeeded by Charles W. Ryder
Preceded by William S. Key	Commanding General V Corps; 1942–1943	Succeeded by Leonard T. Gerow
