= Randall, Minnesota =

City in Minnesota, United States

- City
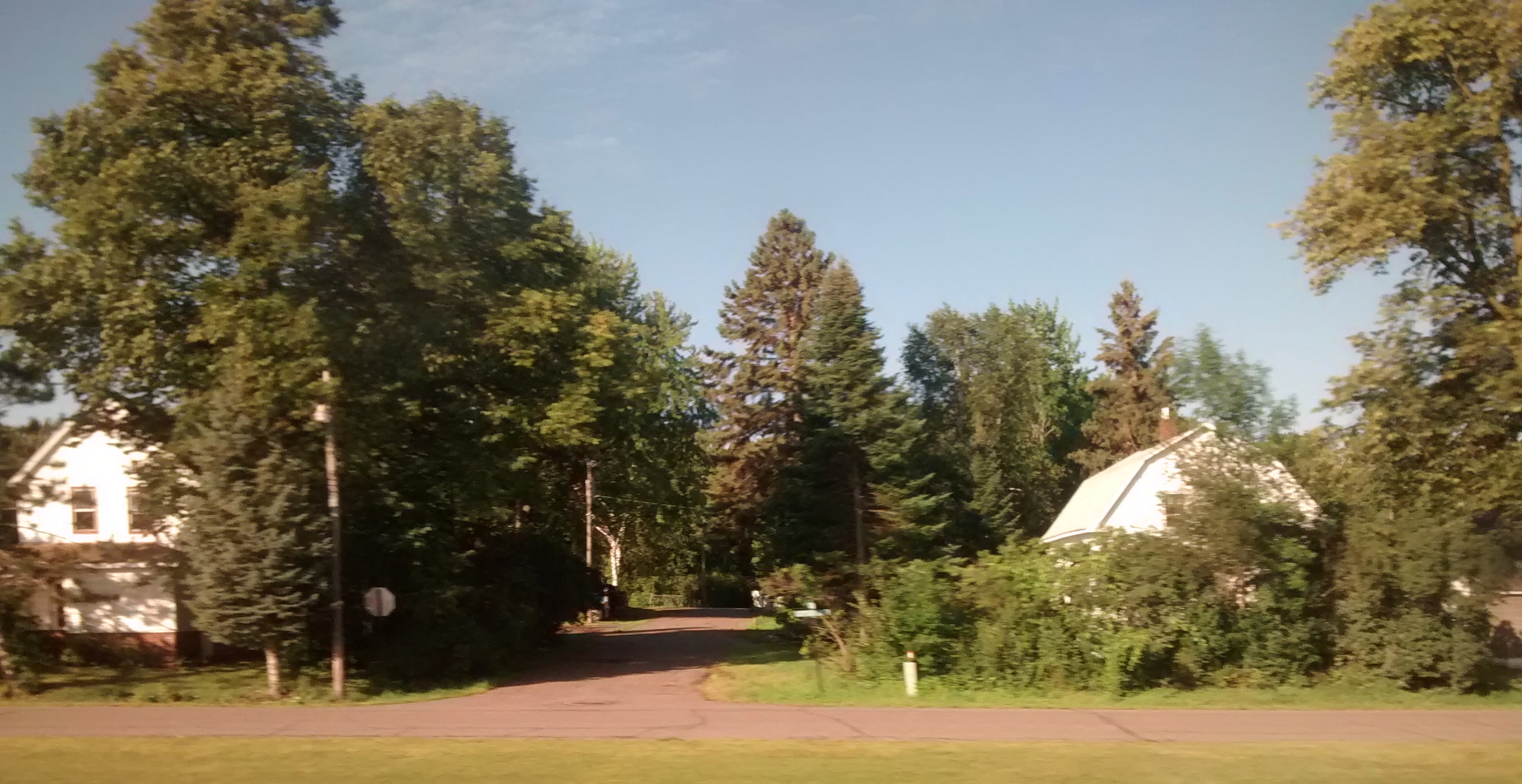
- Houses in Randall
- Motto: Little City with a Big Heart
- Location in Morrison County and the state of Minnesota
- Coordinates: 46°5′18″N 94°29′58″W
- Country: United States
- State: Minnesota
- County: Morrison

Government
  - Mayor: Dan Noss
  - City council: Members: Carrie Turner; James Chyba; Jeff Wright; Mary Venske

Area
  - Total: 2.00 sq mi (5.18 km^{2})
  - Land: 2.00 sq mi (5.18 km^{2})
  - Water: 0 sq mi (0.00 km^{2})
- Elevation: 1,178 ft (359 m)

Population (2020)
  - Total: 607
  - Density: 303.7/sq mi (117.25/km^{2})
- Time zone: UTC-6 (Central (CST))
  - Summer (DST): UTC-5 (CDT)
- ZIP code: 56475
- Area code: 320
- FIPS code: 27-53080
- GNIS feature ID: 2396313
- Website: www.randall.govoffice2.com

Randall is a city in Morrison County, Minnesota, United States. The population was 607 at the 2020 census.

== History ==
Randall was platted in 1890 and named for John H. Randall, a railroad official. A post office has been in operation at Randall since 1889. Randall was incorporated in 1900.

=== The Great Flood of 1972 ===
In the Great Flash Flood of July 21–22, 1972, the Little Elk River overflowed its banks, flooding downtown Randall and making the area impassable to vehicle traffic for several weeks. Local citizens reported that Randall received over 13 inches (330 mm) of rain in a single day during the deluge. Official precipitation data for the town do not exist, but the National Weather Service station in nearby Fort Ripley received 10.84 inches (275 mm) of rain in 24 hours during the flood, the second-biggest one-day rainfall ever recorded in Minnesota (15.10 inches was officially recorded in Hokah, in southeast Minnesota, on August 18, 2007).

The damage from the deluge was exacerbated by its timing. The rain came just 12 days after a storm had dumped up to 7 inches (180 mm) of rain in the region, setting off an outbreak of flash floods in communities west of town. With the exception of Interstate 35, every major highway in the northern half of the state was closed from Alexandria to Wisconsin.

== Geography ==
Randall is in northwestern Morrison County. It is bordered to the north, east, and south by Darling Township and to the west by Parker Township. U.S. Highway 10 and Minnesota State Highway 115 are the main routes in the community. US 10 leads southeast 11 miles (18 km) to Little Falls, the Morrison county seat, and northwest 20 miles (32 km) to Motley, while Highway 115 leads east 8 miles (13 km) to Camp Ripley and the Mississippi River.

According to the U.S. Census Bureau, Randall has an area of 2.00 square miles (5.18 km^{2}), all of it recorded as land. Randall is on the banks of the Little Elk River, approximately 10 miles (16 km) northwest of its confluence with the Mississippi. The area of rolling hills and wide river valleys is at the southwestern edge of the Brainerd Lakes area. The largest lake in the area, Lake Alexander, 8 miles (13 km) north of Randall, is known for its clear water and excellent fishing. Numerous smaller lakes in the area, including Little Round Lake, Green Prairie Fish Lake, Fish Trap Lake, Round Lake, and Lake Shamineau, provide abundant recreation opportunities year-round.

== Demographics ==
Historical population
Census	Pop.	Note	%±
1910	195		—
1920	301		54.4%
1930	302		0.3%
1940	362		19.9%
1950	425		17.4%
1960	516		21.4%
1970	536		3.9%
1980	527		−1.7%
1990	571		8.3%
2000	535		−6.3%
2010	650		21.5%
2020	607		−6.6%
U.S. Decennial Census

=== 2010 census ===
As of the census of 2010, there were 650 people, 264 households, and 174 families living in the city. The population density was 317.1 inhabitants per square mile (122.4/km^{2}). There were 301 housing units at an average density of 146.8 per square mile (56.7/km^{2}). The racial makeup of the city was 97.2% White, 0.6% African American, 0.2% Native American, 0.8% from other races, and 1.2% from two or more races. Hispanic or Latino of any race were 1.1% of the population.

There were 264 households, of which 34.1% had children under the age of 18 living with them, 42.4% were married couples living together, 14.4% had a female householder with no husband present, 9.1% had a male householder with no wife present, and 34.1% were non-families. 28.8% of all households were made up of individuals, and 13.6% had someone living alone who was 65 years of age or older. The average household size was 2.45 and the average family size was 2.90.

The median age in the city was 33.9 years. 27.1% of residents were under the age of 18; 9.3% were between the ages of 18 and 24; 27.9% were from 25 to 44; 20.6% were from 45 to 64; and 15.1% were 65 years of age or older. The gender makeup of the city was 50.2% male and 49.8% female.

=== 2000 census ===
As of the census of 2000, there were 535 people, 217 households, and 144 families living in the city. The population density was 256.9 inhabitants per square mile (99.2/km^{2}). There were 229 housing units at an average density of 110.0 per square mile (42.5/km^{2}). The racial makeup of the city was 96.64% White, 1.12% Native American, 0.19% Pacific Islander, 0.19% from other races, and 1.87% from two or more races. Hispanic or Latino of any race were 0.19% of the population.

There were 217 households, out of which 30.4% had children under the age of 18 living with them, 53.0% were married couples living together, 7.8% had a female householder with no husband present, and 33.2% were non-families. 30.0% of all households were made up of individuals, and 18.0% had someone living alone who was 65 years of age or older. The average household size was 2.47 and the average family size was 3.05.

In the city, the population was spread out, with 27.3% under the age of 18, 8.0% from 18 to 24, 28.2% from 25 to 44, 19.4% from 45 to 64, and 17.0% who were 65 years of age or older. The median age was 36 years. For every 100 females, there were 105.8 males. For every 100 females age 18 and over, there were 108.0 males.

The median income for a household in the city was $35,000, and the median income for a family was $40,750. Males had a median income of $31,000 versus $21,058 for females. The per capita income for the city was $15,792. About 16.2% of families and 15.2% of the population were below the poverty line, including 19.4% of those under age 18 and 12.4% of those age 65 or over.

== Transportation ==
Amtrak’s Empire Builder, which operates between Seattle/Portland and Chicago, passes through the town on BNSF tracks, but makes no stop. The nearest station is located in Staples, 28 miles (45 km) to the northwest.

== Education ==
Randall has one elementary school, the Dr. S G Knight elementary school, part of the Little Falls School District. It serves students from kindergarten through fifth grade.
