= Minnesota Military & Veterans Museum =

Military history museum in Minnesota, United States

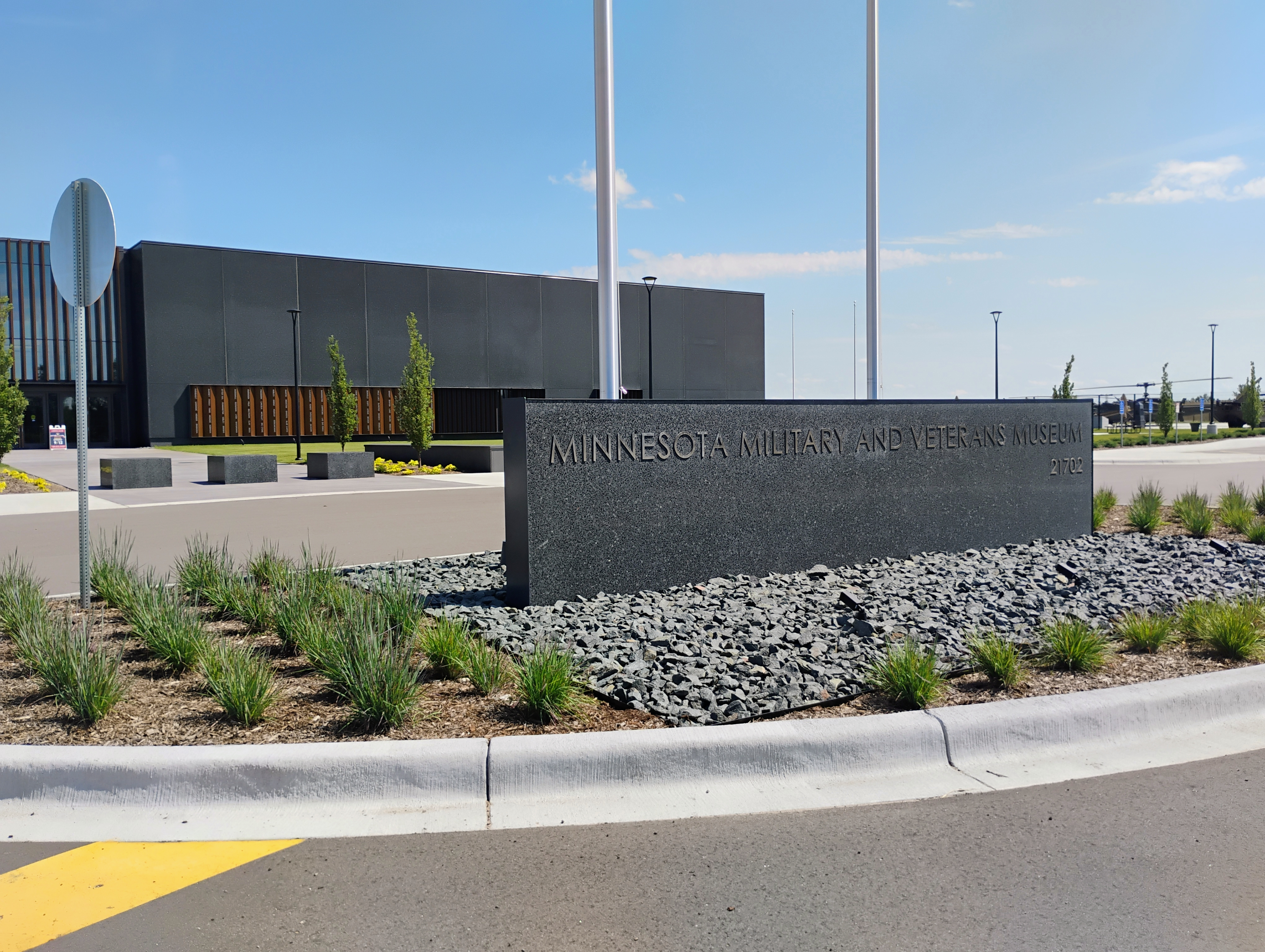
- New museum building
- Established: 1977
- Location: 21702 Haven Road, Little Falls, Minnesota, 56345
- Coordinates: 46.076336°N 94.325758°W
- Type: Military history museum
- Executive director: Randal Dietrich
- Archivist: Daniel Ewer
- Chairperson: Mark Ritchie
- Curator: Doug Thompson
- Employees: 7
- Website: www.mnvetmuseum.org

The Minnesota Military & Veterans Museum is a non-profit educational organization chartered to preserve and explain Minnesota’s military history. It is federally recognized as a charitable 501(c)(3) organization. MMVM operates the library, archive and museum as a public–private partnership in cooperation with the Minnesota Historical Society and the Minnesota National Guard. The museum, which is open to the general public year-round, is located adjacent to Camp Ripley, a state-owned 53,000 acres (21,000 ha; 83 sq mi) military training center on the Mississippi River just north of Little Falls in central Minnesota. The museum's mission encompasses all branches of service as well as the home front and is certified by the United States Army Center of Military History and the United States Air Force.

== Collections ==
The museum is the largest and most comprehensive repository in Minnesota for military artifacts and records. The collection holds nearly 35,000 artifacts: uniforms, weapons, equipment, insignia and flags, training aids, and personal items—objects central to the museum's core mission—as well as tanks, aircraft, vehicles, artillery pieces, etc..

=== Museum Exhibits ===
- America at War – The causes, conduct, and consequences of America's major wars since Minnesota statehood in 1858.
- State Forces – The story of Minnesota's state armed forces—most notably the National Guard—from pre-Civil War militia days to present-day worldwide deployments.
- Forts on the Frontier – How Minnesota's early forts and garrisons kept the peace and aided Euro-American colonization of Native American lands in the western regions of the continent. Special attention is given to Fort Ripley, a U.S. Army outpost on the Mississippi River that existed 1849–1877 within the boundaries of present-day Camp Ripley.
- The Arms Room – The development of military small arms in the 19th and 20th centuries. Pistols and revolvers, rifles and carbines, submachine guns, machine guns, edged weapons, ammunition, and more.
- Honors – A tribute to Minnesotans who received the Medal of Honor, plus military decorations past and present.
- Story of the Jeep – The fabled American military Jeep and Minnesota's role in its development. Six representative models are on display, from early World War II until phase-out in the 1980s (open summers only).
- Outdoor Exhibits – Vehicles, tanks, aircraft, artillery, etc. are on display throughout the museum grounds. Visitors can step inside a rare 40 & 8 boxcar used to transport American troops and horses in France during World War I, or inspect one of Camp Ripley's ubiquitous “tin hut” and latrine exhibits outfitted ca. 1965.
- Special Exhibits – In addition to permanent exhibits, the museum typically presents temporary exhibits on changing topics. In recent years these have included: Women in the Ranks, Remembering Pearl Harbor, Airborne!, History of the Minnesota-based 34th Infantry Division 1917–Present, Norwegian-Americans and the 99th Infantry Battalion (Sep) during World War II, and Minnesota in the American Civil War.

The sail and rudder of the submarine USS Minneapolis-Saint Paul (SSN-708) are on display. The number three 4-inch/50-caliber gun of the destroyer USS Ward, which was manned by Minnesota Naval Militia sailors during the Attack on Pearl Harbor and is believed to have fired the first American shots of the attack, sinking a Japanese midget submarine, was moved to the museum from its outdoor display at the Minnesota State Capitol in Saint Paul.

=== Museum Archive ===
The searchable archive is the state's largest veteran, military unit, and veteran organization record repository. The archive includes photographs, personal letters and diaries, scrapbooks, maps, posters, sheet music, periodicals and newspapers, official correspondence, records, and military orders. Audio-visual materials include films, audio tapes, video tapes, DVDs and CDs.

=== Museum Library ===
The museum's military history library contains more than 15,000 circulating books and pamphlets, including a very large collection of military technical and field manuals. Special attention is given to materials that specifically relate to the military experiences of Minnesotans and to military units with Minnesota ties.

== Facilities ==
The museum's previous main building was located on the grounds of Camp Ripley and was also used during the summer as a headquarters building for the Minnesota National Guard. Its architecture was inspired by the buildings of Fort Ripley, a 19th-century frontier army post (1849–1877) once located a few miles upriver. The building was expanded and remodeled in 1986–1987 for exclusive use by the museum. It housed most of the museum's exhibits, administrative offices, and the gift shop. Since 1987, several adjacent buildings had also been rehabilitated to provide work, storage and exhibit space. The entire museum complex covered 2 acres (0.81 ha; 0.00 sq mi) and included nine buildings.

The museum broke ground on a new 40,000 sq ft (3,700 m^{2}) facility on September 17, 2023, and it opened to the public on September 11, 2026. It is located on the east side of Minnesota State Highway 371, across from Camp Ripley. In contrast with the previous museum facilities, it is not on the grounds of the camp itself, eliminating the need for visitors to undergo a routine security check at the camp gates before visiting the museum.

== See also ==
- Military history of Minnesota
- Military personnel from Minnesota
- Military units and formations in Minnesota
