= Ellard A. Walsh =

United States Army general

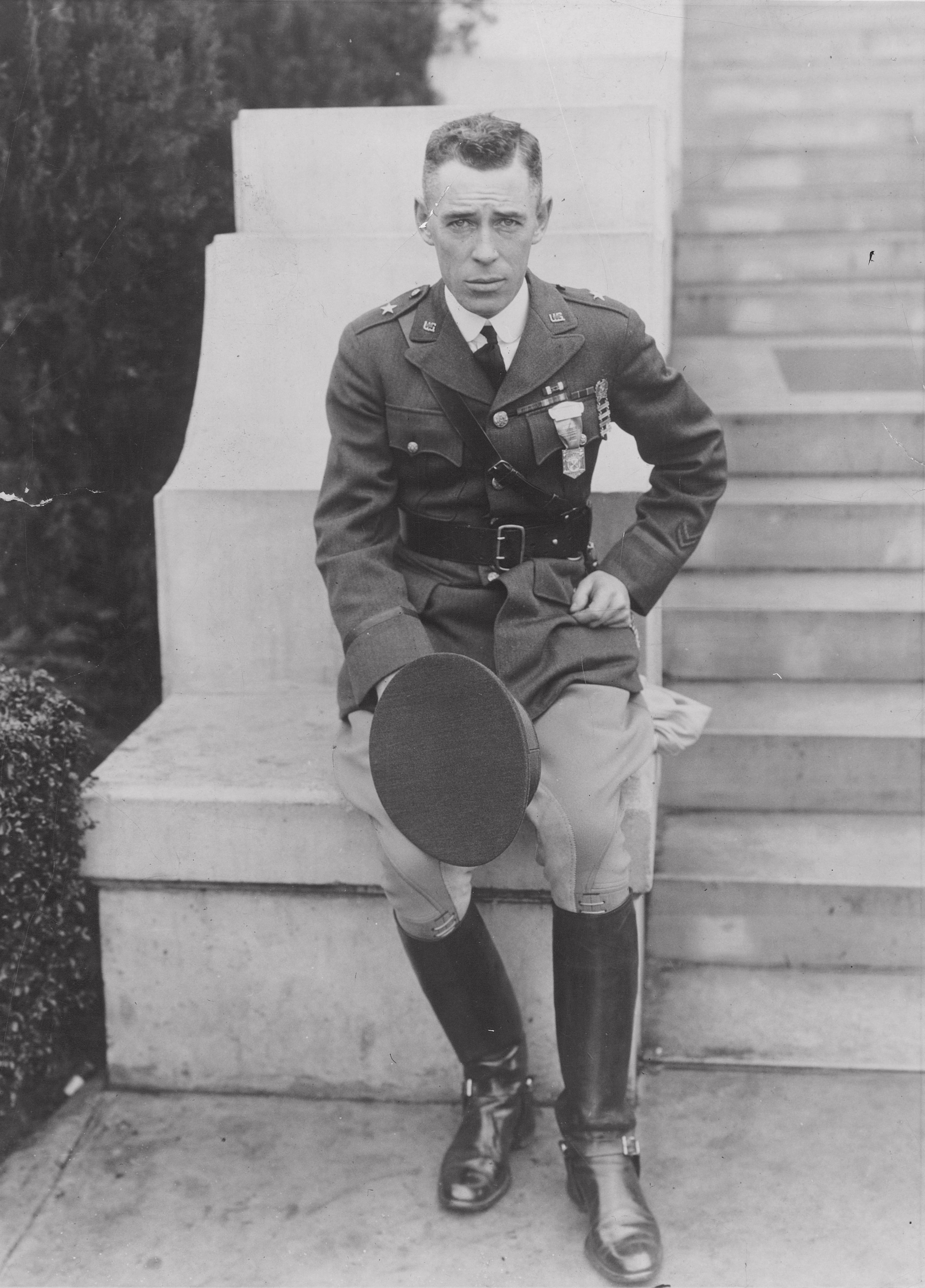
- Walsh in 1928
- Born: October 3, 1887; Ottawa, Ontario, Canada
- Died: August 1, 1975 (aged 87); Stillwater, Minnesota, US
- Burial place: Green Prairie Cemetery, Little Falls, Minnesota
- Military career
- Allegiance: United States
- Branch: United States Army
- Service years: 1905-1949
- Rank: Major General
- Nickname: Mr. National Guard
- Commands: 34th Infantry Division
- Conflicts: World War I World War II

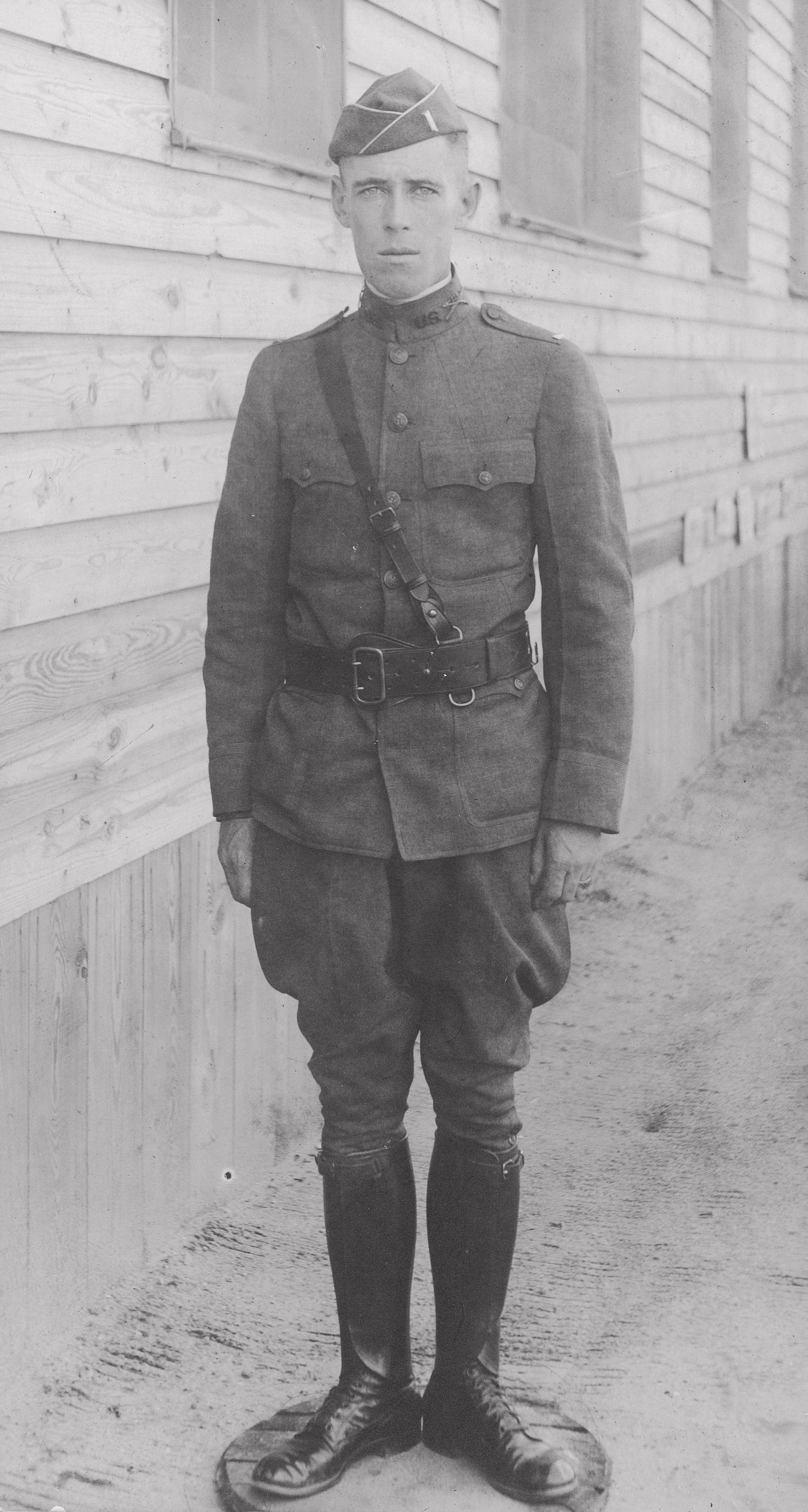
Lieutenant Ellard A. Walsh (1920)

Major General Ellard A. Walsh (October 3, 1887 – August 1, 1975) was a U.S. Army National Guard officer who is recognized as the "father" of the modern National Guard. He also commanded the 34th Infantry Division during the run up to World War II.

== Early life ==
Walsh was born in Ottawa, Ontario, Canada on October 3, 1887, the oldest child of Edward J. Walsh and Mary Anne (Roach) Walsh. His parents relocated to Minnesota in 1891, and Walsh was educated in the public schools of Minneapolis. He was a 1907 graduate of North High School, and attended the University of Minnesota. Walsh worked at a variety of occupations before becoming a full time member of the Minnesota National Guard as assistant adjutant general after World War I, including farm laborer and auditor.

== Start of military career ==
Walsh enlisted in the 1st Infantry Regiment, Minnesota National Guard on November 7, 1905. The 1st Infantry was mustered into federal service on June 30, 1916, for duty at Camp Llano Grande, near Mercedes, Texas, on the Mexico–United States border.

== World War I ==
The 1st Infantry was called into federal service on March 25, 1917, and mustered out beginning on March 26, 1917, in preparation of service overseas. During that period, Walsh had been promoted to first sergeant.

On October 1, 1917, the 1st Infantry was re-designated as the 135th Infantry Regiment, 34th Division, and Walsh was commissioned as a second lieutenant. The 34th arrived in France just prior to the armistice and saw no action as a unit; however, elements of the division were used as replacements for other divisions. The 34th Division was demobilized on February 18, 1919.

== Between the world wars ==
Walsh's unit was reorganized as the 1st Infantry Regiment, Minnesota National Guard on January 31, 1920. Walsh possessed administrative and people skills that enabled him to rise quickly through the ranks. He was promoted to lieutenant colonel and named the Assistant Adjutant General of Minnesota in 1921. Walsh was promoted to brigadier general on July 1, 1927, and he was appointed as the Adjutant General of Minnesota.

Walsh served as president of the National Guard Association of the United States (NGAUS), from 1928 to 1930.

In 1929, Walsh was tasked to locate a new training facility site for the Guard, and selected a 12,000-acre area near Little Falls, Minnesota. At that location, Camp Ripley was constructed in 1930.

On May 16, 1934, the truck driver's union initiated a strike (Minneapolis Teamsters Strike of 1934), which quickly degenerated into open violence in the streets of Minneapolis. Minnesota Governor Floyd B. Olson activated the National Guard, and Walsh commanded 4,000 Guardsmen in the suppression of the chaos. Utilizing roving patrols, curfews, and security details, Walsh quickly restored order, thus enabling negotiated settlement of the labor dispute.

Walsh put the strike experience to good use five years later when a tornado struck Anoka, Minnesota on June 18, 1939. Governor Harold E. Stassen called in the National Guard, and Adjutant General Walsh commanded 300 Guardsmen who patrolled the streets and imposed a quasi-martial law while the community was stabilized.

== Prelude to World War II ==
The expanding war in Europe threatened to draw a reluctant United States into the conflict. As the potential of U.S. involvement became more evident, the Franklin D. Roosevelt administration still hoped to avoid war, while military leaders needed to prepare to fight.

A review of existing legislation, including the National Defense Act of 1916 and its amendments, indicated that new legislation was needed to ensure effective integration of the National Guard into the regular Army, draft and selective service regulations, and related matters.

While legislative review was in motion, initial steps were taken to prepare troops for what lay ahead through "precautionary training." The 34th Infantry Division was deemed one of the most service-ready units, and Walsh was promoted to major general in June, 1940, and placed in command.

The Selective Training and Service Act of 1940 was signed into law September 16, and the first conscription in U.S. history during peacetime commenced.

The 34th was subsequently activated on February 10, 1941, with troops from North Dakota, South Dakota, Minnesota, and Iowa. The division was transported by rail and truck convoys to the newly constructed Camp Claiborne in Rapides Parish, Louisiana, near Alexandria.

The soldiers started rigorous training including maneuvers in Alexandria starting April 7, 1941. The climate during the summer was especially harsh. The division then participated in what became known as the Louisiana Maneuvers. By then, the division was becoming a well-disciplined, high spirited, and well prepared unit.

In the early phase of the maneuvers, Walsh, who suffered from chronic ulcers, became too ill to continue in command, and was replaced by Major General Russell P. Hartle on August 5, 1941.

== Post active military service ==
Walsh remained the Minnesota Adjutant General until his retirement from the military in 1949 at age 62.

In 1943, while the National Guard was fully engaged in the war effort, Lieutenant General Lesley J. McNair, commanding general, Army Ground Forces and other leaders of the regular Army met to develop plans that would determine the role of the National Guard after the war. The initial plan was developed without any input from Guard leadership. Walsh became aware of this activity, rallied political and public support for the Guard, and even used his personal funds to ensure the Guard would play a continued and key role in the military readiness of the country.

Walsh was appointed to a second term as president of the National Guard Association of the United States (NGAUS), this time from 1943 to 1957. During that period, he established a national NGAUS office in Washington, D.C., and the organization's national magazine, both of which continue to this day.

In addition, by January 1946, Walsh had laid the necessary groundwork in Washington for creation of a new, Minnesota-based infantry division for the postwar Army National Guard. Creating the 47th Infantry Division in Minnesota would avoid having to share a postwar-34th Infantry Division with Iowa.

Walsh was a charter member of American Legion Post 339 in Minneapolis, and was awarded the Legion's Distinguished Service Medal in 1955.

Walsh died August 1, 1975, in Stillwater, Minnesota, and was buried in Green Prairie Cemetery, Little Falls, Minnesota.

== Legacy ==
In recognition of Walsh's half century of distinguished military service and numerous contributions to the Guard, a wing of the National Guard Memorial in Washington, D.C., was named the Walsh-Reckord Hall of States. It is fitting that the Hall of States was co-named for Walsh and Major General Milton Reckord, as Reckord was a decorated veteran of both World War I and World War II, and long serving Adjutant General for Maryland, as well as president of the NGAUS as well, and Walsh and Reckord worked together on important issues that greatly promoted the Guard.

Military offices
Preceded by Newly activated organization	Commanding General 34th Infantry Division; February–August 1941	Succeeded by Russell P. Hartle
