= Little Elk River =

Coordinates: 46.0099657°N 94.3636138°W

Location
- Country: United States

Physical characteristics
- Source
  - location: Minnesota

The Little Elk River is a 29.4-mile-long (47.3 km) tributary of the Mississippi River in Morrison County, Minnesota.

The Little Elk Wildlife Management area, managed by the Minnesota Department of Natural Resources, is located near the small town of Randall. A dike on the river created a 400-acre wetland that attracted waterfowl. That dike was breached after extraordinary rainfall in 1999, draining the wetland. Four years later, construction began on a new, improved dike using federal and state grant money.

Until the construction of the Little Falls Dam, there was a water power mill at the mouth of the Little Elk River.

== See also ==
- List of rivers of Minnesota
- Minnesota Watersheds
