= Lichtenberg Mountain =

Mountain in Washington (state), United States

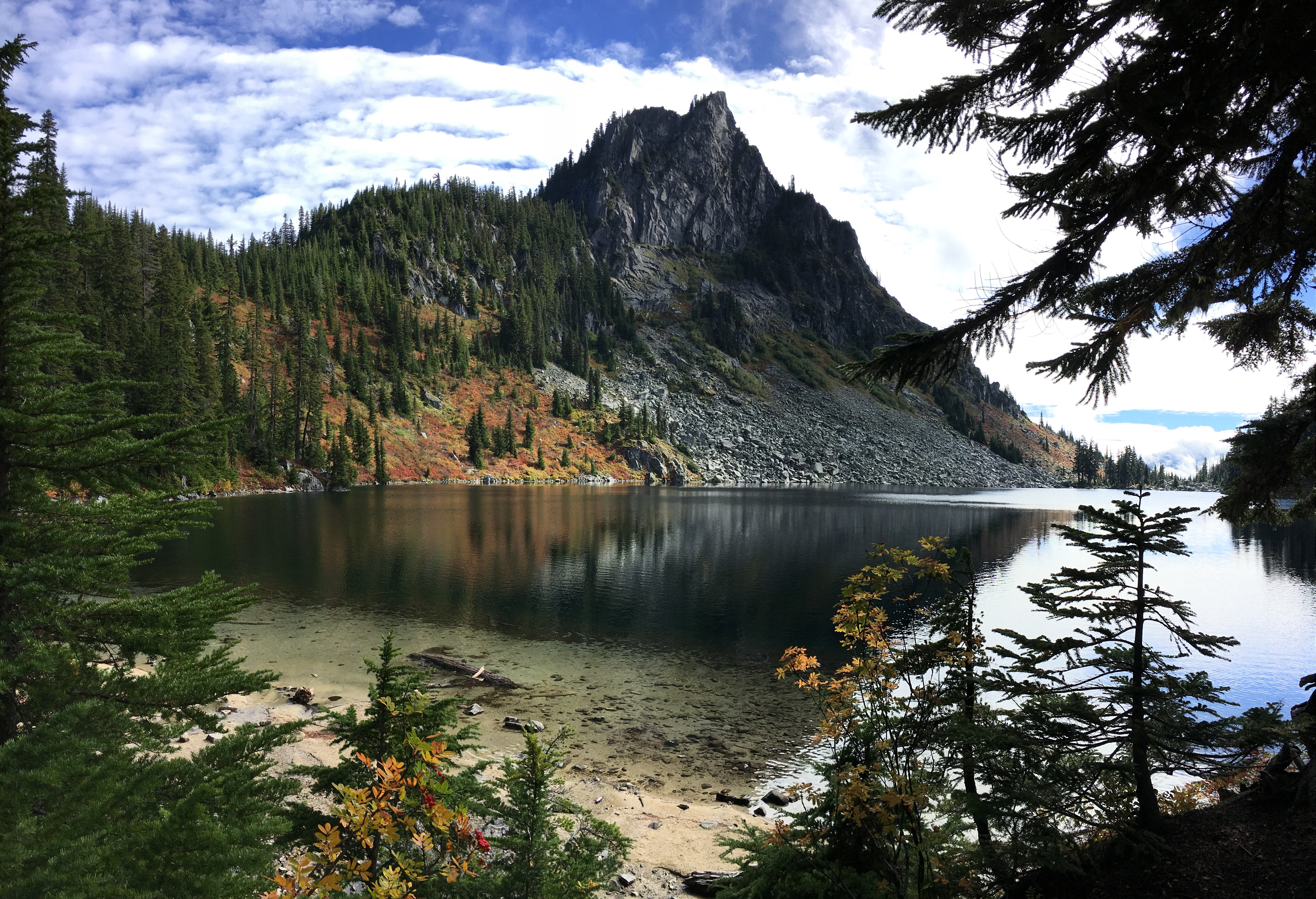
- Lichtenberg Mountain with Lake Valhalla in the foreground.

Highest point
- Elevation: 5,844 ft (1,781 m)
- Prominence: 1,124 ft (343 m)
- Coordinates: 47°47′16″N 121°05′27″W

Geography
- Location within Washington (state) Location within the United States
- Parent range: Cascade Range
- Topo map: USGS Labyrinth Mountain

Climbing
- Easiest route: Scrambling

Lichtenberg Mountain is a 5,844-foot (1,781-metre) mountain summit located 2.8 miles (4.5 km) north of Stevens Pass in the Okanogan-Wenatchee National Forest of the U.S state of Washington. It rises steeply above the east shore of Lake Valhalla, and less steeply above the west shore of Lichtenwasser Lake. Surface runoff from the mountain drains into tributaries of Nason Creek which in turn is a tributary of the Wenatchee River

== Climate ==
Lichtenberg Mountain is located in the marine west coast climate zone of western North America. Most weather fronts originate in the Pacific Ocean, and travel northeast toward the Cascade Mountains. As fronts approach the North Cascades, they are forced upward by the peaks of the Cascade Range, causing them to drop their moisture in the form of rain or snowfall onto the Cascades (Orographic lift). As a result, the west side of the North Cascades experiences high precipitation, especially during the winter months in the form of snowfall. During winter months, weather is usually cloudy, but, due to high pressure systems over the Pacific Ocean that intensify during summer months, there is often little or no cloud cover during the summer. Because of maritime influence, snow tends to be wet and heavy, resulting in avalanche danger.

== Geology ==
The history of the formation of the Cascade Mountains dates back millions of years ago to the late Eocene Epoch. With the North American Plate overriding the Pacific Plate, episodes of volcanic igneous activity persisted. In addition, small fragments of the oceanic and continental lithosphere called terranes created the North Cascades about 50 million years ago.

During the Pleistocene period dating back over two million years ago, glaciation advancing and retreating repeatedly scoured the landscape leaving deposits of rock debris. The U-shaped cross section of the river valleys is a result of recent glaciation. Uplift and faulting in combination with glaciation have been the dominant processes which have created the tall peaks and deep valleys of the North Cascades area.

== See also ==
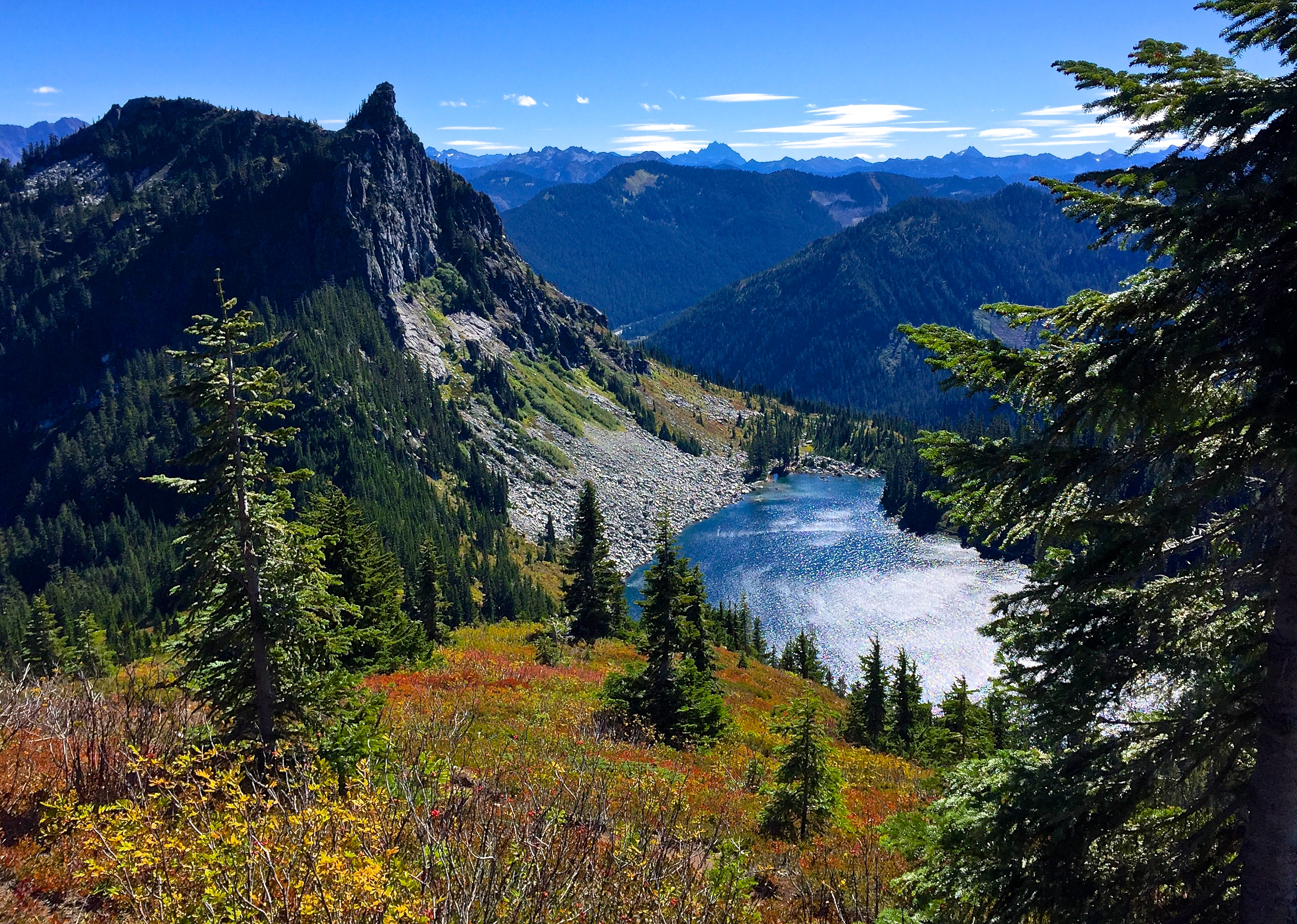
Mt. Lichtenberg and Lake Valhalla

- Geography of Washington (state)
- Geology of the Pacific Northwest
- Mountain peaks of the United States
- Lake Valhalla
