= USS Saint Paul =

There have been three ships of the United States Navy named USS Saint Paul for Saint Paul, Minnesota:

- USS Saint Paul (SP-1643), a former passenger liner which was refitted into a Saint Louis-class auxiliary cruiser and was in commission in 1898, and again from 1917 to 1919.
- USS Saint Paul (CA-71), a Baltimore-class heavy cruiser, was the original name of USS Quincy (CA-71).
- USS Saint Paul (CA-73), another Baltimore-class heavy cruiser in commission from 1945 to 1971.

== See also ==
- USS Minneapolis
- USS Minneapolis–Saint Paul
