= Hotel Walhalla =

Historic building in Lower Saxony, Germany

Coordinates: 52.2773°N 8.0409°E

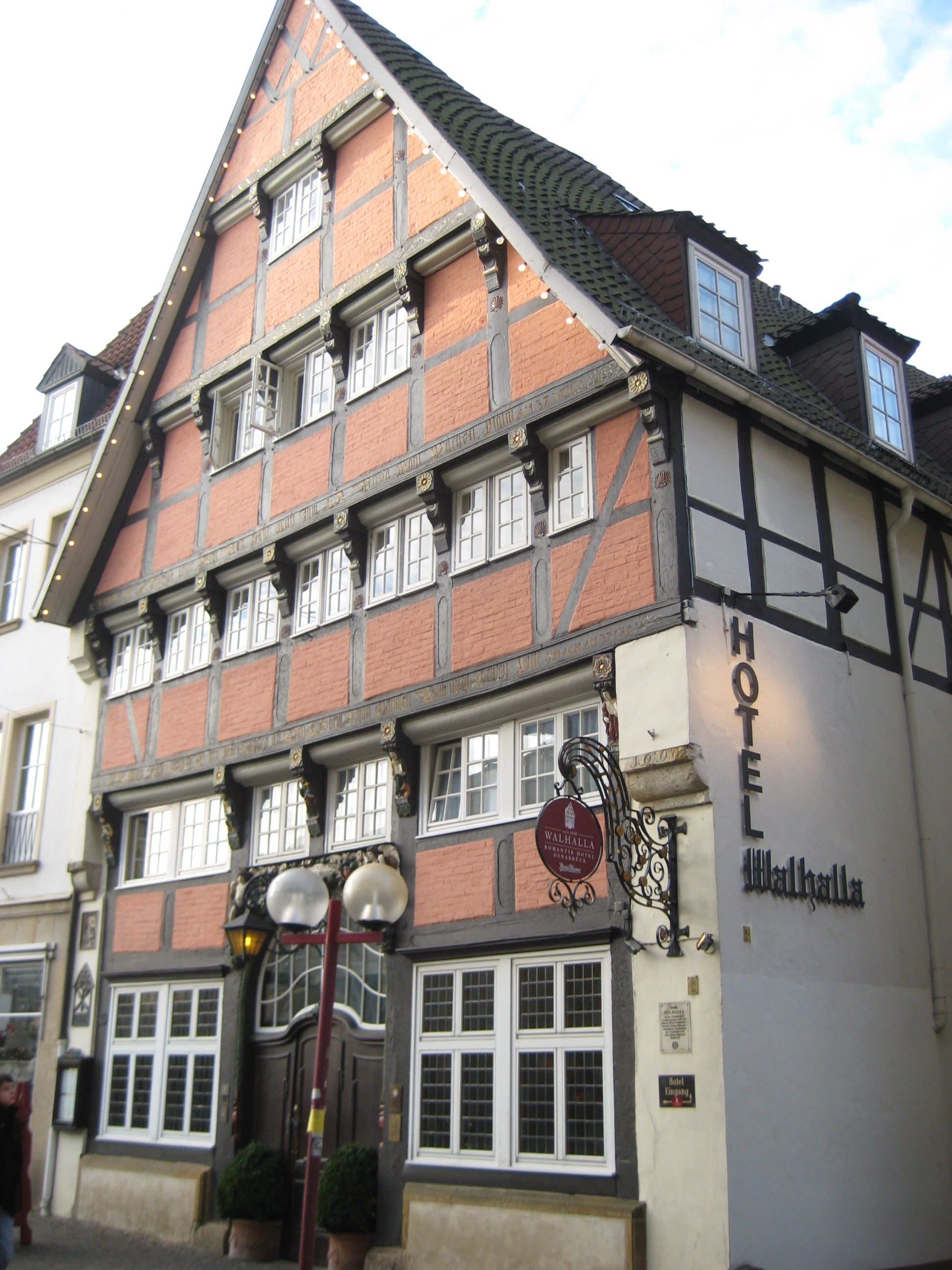
The Hotel Walhalla

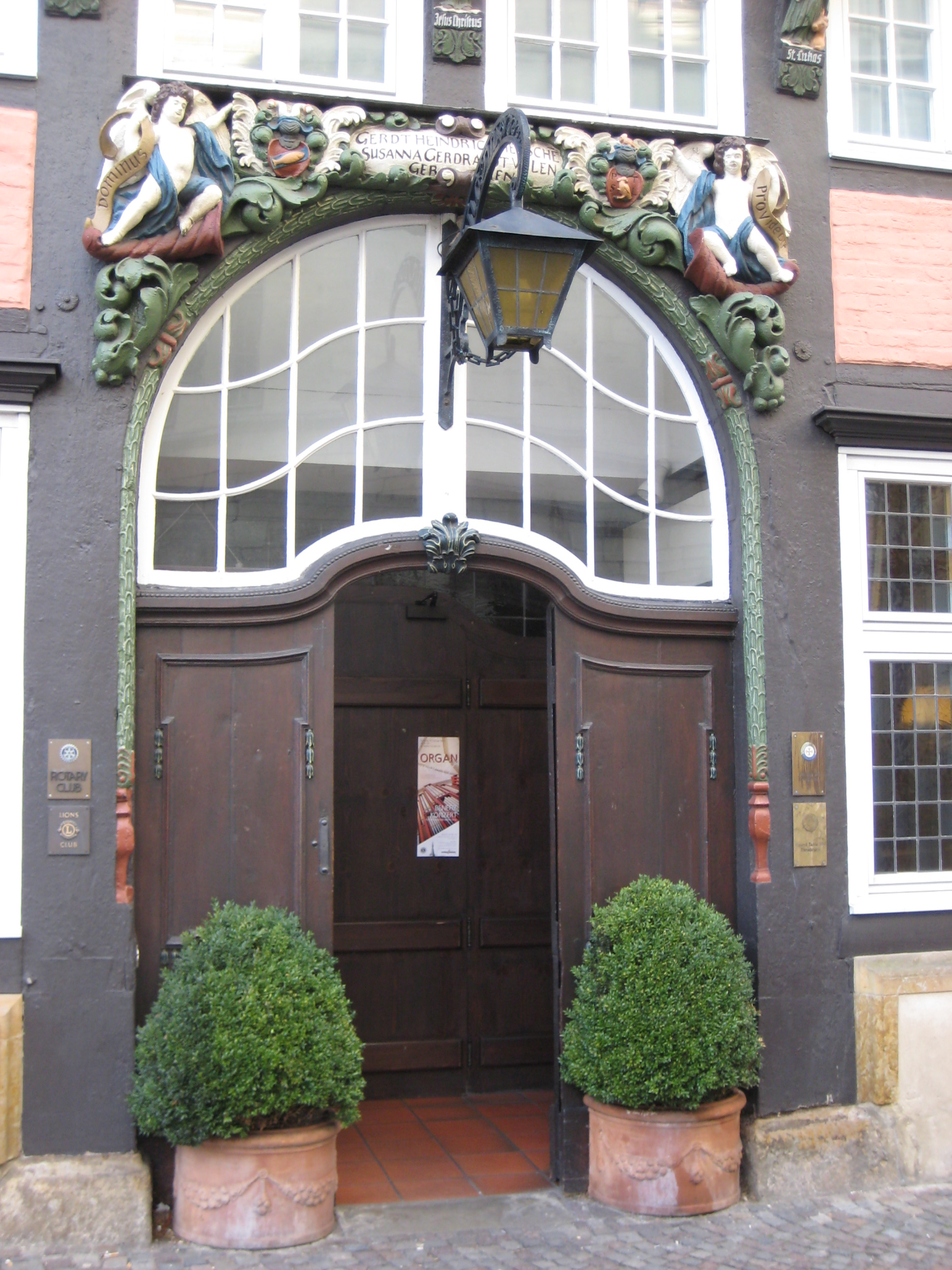
Portal of the hotel

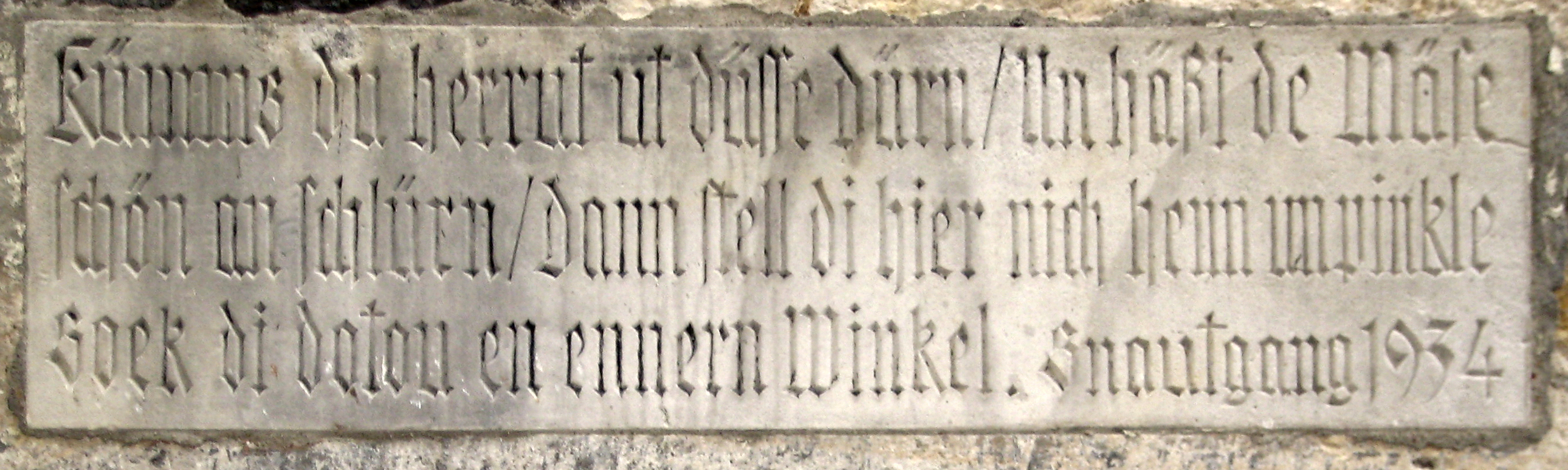
Schnatgangstein (Border walk stone) of the Heger Laischaft (Heger Farmers' Group) at the Hotel Walhalla

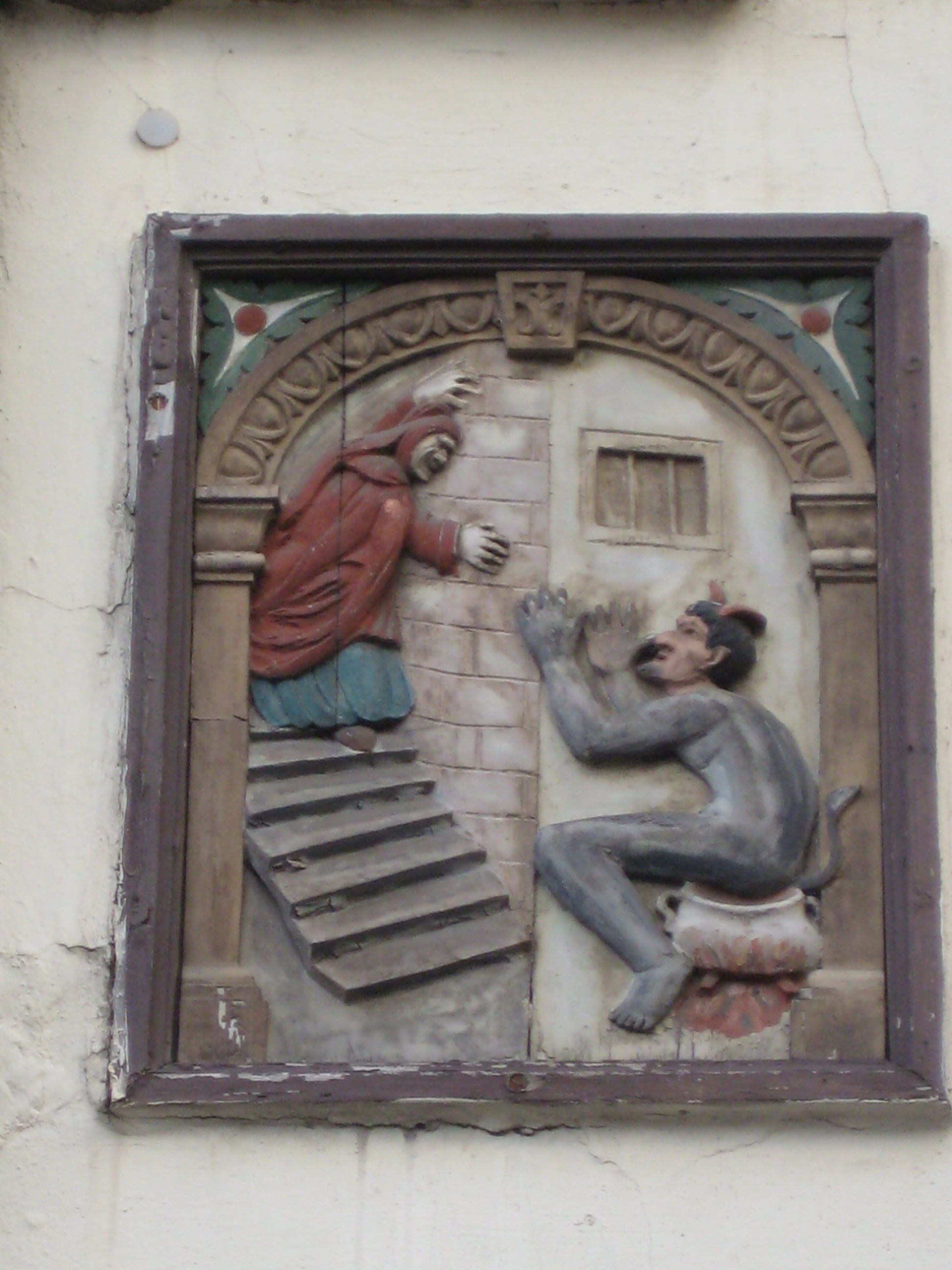
Sandstone relief Großmutter und Teufel (Grandmother and the Devil) on the firewall, copied from the original 16th/17th century version

The Hotel Walhalla is a listed half-timbered building in the Baroque style, located in Osnabrück, Lower Saxony, Germany.

The building has functioned as a restaurant since its construction in 1690. Its name is derived from Valhalla, the resting place of fallen warriors in Nordic mythology.

== Location ==
The Hotel Walhalla is situated on Bierstraße in the Altstadt (old town) area of Osnabrück, in the close proximity of the town hall and market place.

== History ==
In 1690, bailiff Gerdt Heindrich Meuschen built a three-storey, gable-ended half-timbered house on Bierstraße. The gables along the ridged roof protrude in a similar manner to the second floor. Meuschen had a medallion added above the entrance portal; alongside this are the familial emblems of the building’s constructor and his wife Susanne Gertraud (née von Lengerken). The half-timbered consoles are furnished with carved figures of the evangelists Matthew, Mark, Luke and John as well as Jesus. The rear side of the building was originally built as a Steinwerk (stone work).

There is known to have been a predecessor building, built in 1530, on the site. This was possibly destroyed during the city fire of 1613 – in which 900 other houses were destroyed – although it may have been taken down to make way for a new building. Meuschen’s new building was eventually passed on to his daughter and later to his granddaughter – both of whom were married to wine merchants. Christian Jäger, a relative, set up a wine tavern there in 1740, which was visited by numerous city notables and styled the “Ratsschenke” (Council Tavern) on account of its proximity to the town hall. One of its most prominent guests was the 18th century jurist, politician and historian Justus Möser, a native Osnabrücker born in 1720. The house remained family property until the death of Jäger’s daughter Marie Gertrud, who was married to the wine merchant Justus Wilhelm Tenge. The first guest rooms were set up in 1820. After the death of Marie Gertrud Tenge, a series of alternating hosts continued to maintain the building as an inn. From 1876 to 1971 the house belonged to the Grabe family, during which time it was intermittently leased.

In 1934 a memorial stone was installed on one of the side doors, commemorating the Schnatgang (border walk) of the Heger Laischaft (Heger Farmers’ Group). It bears the following inscription in Low German: „Küms du herrut ut düsse durn/Un häßt de Mäse schön an schlürn/dann stell di hier nich hin un pinkle/sock di datou en ennern Winkel. Snautgang 1934“.

During World War II, the attic was destroyed by an incendiary bomb during the air raids on Osnabrück on 13 September 1944; the rest of the building was, thankfully, able to be saved. For a time the building had to cease its function as a hotel.

The building was bought by a merchant in 1985. An adjacent building on the street Kleine Gildewart was attached to the hotel. A renovation of the Hotel Walhalla started that same year; it was completed in 1986. In 1992 the hotel complex was further expanded into two houses on Heger Straße and Kleine Gildewart. One of the buildings had been built in 1616 – three years after the city fire of 1613; it is also a listed structure like the main building. Referred to colloquially as the “Katzenhaus”, this half-timbered building with a half-hipped roof was restored in 1977.

The merchant’s daughter took over the hotel in 1993, which she still runs today along with her husband. It has a total of 66 rooms and 100 beds, and two restaurant and conference rooms.

== Guests ==
Over the course of its history the Hotel Walhalla has welcomed numerous prominent guests from Germany and abroad. Alongside Justus Möser these include Justus Wilhelm Lyra, Albert Lortzing and Erich Maria Remarque. Queen Silvia of Sweden stayed here in 1997; the Dalai Lama visited the following year. 1998 saw the 350th anniversary of the Treaty of Westphalia and on this occasion Queen Silvia and Carl XVI Gustav of Sweden, the Norwegian royal couple King Harald V and Sonja, the Danish Queen Margrethe II and Prince Consort Henrik, Belgium’s King Albert II and Queen Paola, Dutch Queen Beatrix, King Juan Carlos I of Spain along with other ruling couples were guests at the Walhalla. Politicians staying at the hotel included then-Federal President Roman Herzog, the Presidents of Italy, Poland, Latvia, Estonia and Lithuania, along with representatives from other countries.

In December 2004, the author Martin Walser wrote about his meetings in Osnabrück and visit to the Hotel Walhalla in an article for the weekly newspaper Die Zeit, talking about eating boiled beef and drinking beer “as though beer was actually my sort of drink”.

== Links ==
- Website of the Hotel Walhalla
