= Valhalla (Camp Ripley) =

Cabin in Minnesota, United States

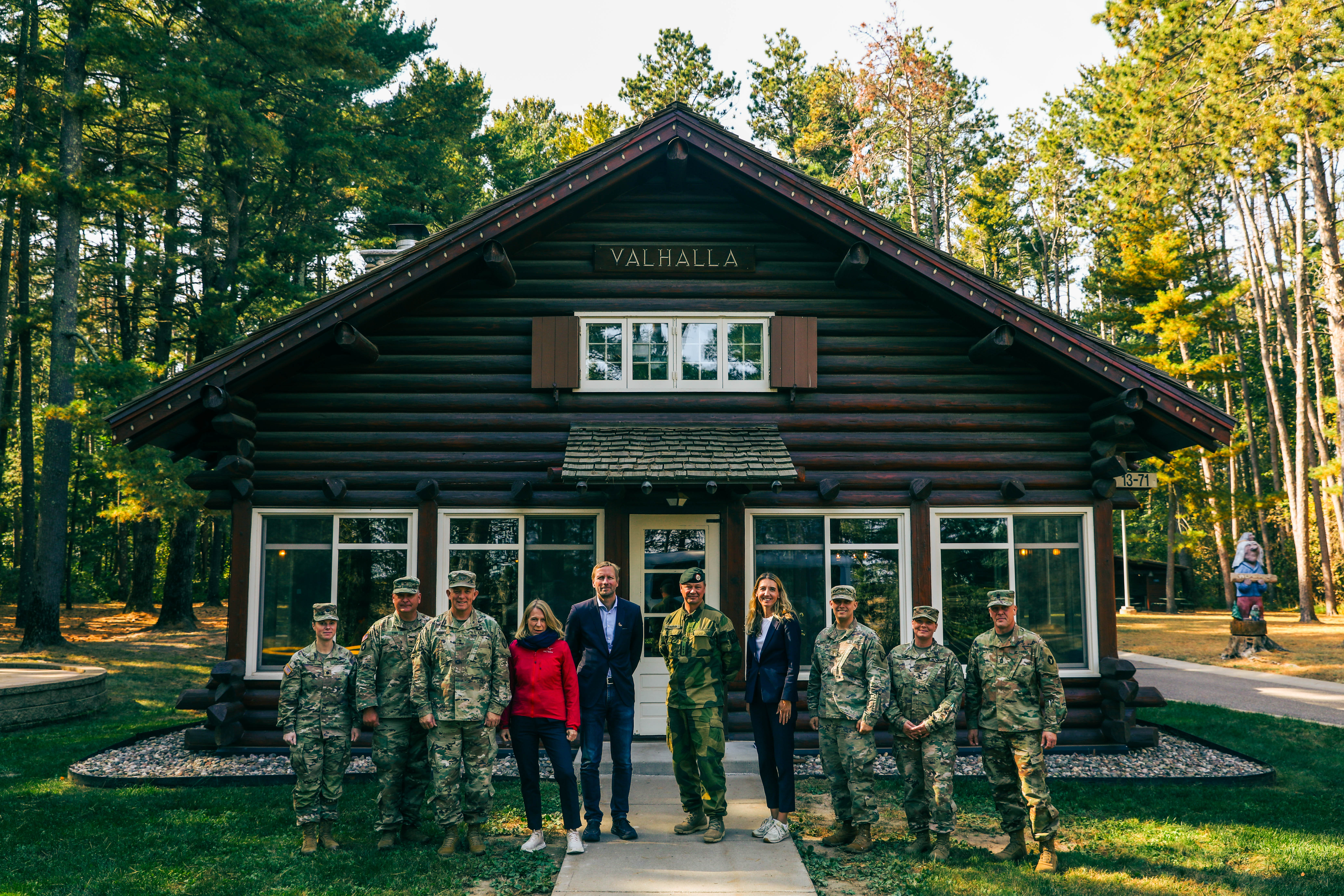
- The lodge in 2024
- Location at Camp Ripley
- Alternative names: Governor's Lodge

General information
- Architectural style: Norwegian
- Location: Camp Ripley Training Center, Little Falls, Minnesota, United States
- Coordinates: 46.0834°N 94.3590°W
- Year built: 1934
- Renovated: 2018

Technical details
- Material: Lodgepole pine logs, cedar shingles

Design and construction
- Main contractor: Civilian Conservation Corps

Valhalla, or the Governor's Lodge, is a historic cabin at the Minnesota National Guard military installation of Camp Ripley near Little Falls, Minnesota, United States. It was constructed in 1934 by the Civilian Conservation Corps as the headquarters for the 34th Infantry Division, but later became lodging for the governor of Minnesota and his guests.

== History ==
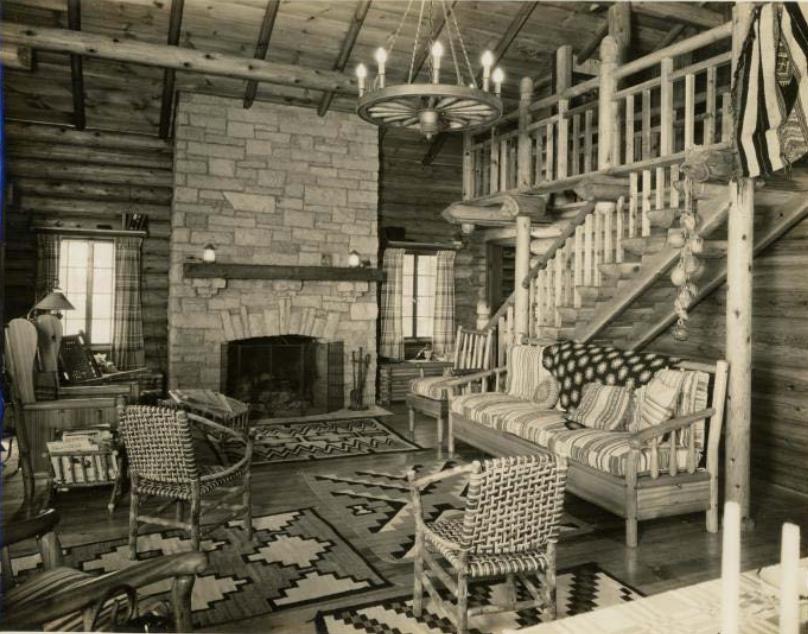
The original interior

The Norwegian-style, lodgepole pine log cabin was constructed in 1934, in a group of pines on the west edge of the garrison area of Camp Ripley. The building cost $13,852, provided by the Federal Emergency Relief Administration and the State of Minnesota, and was built by the Civilian Conservation Corps. It originally served as the 34th Infantry Division headquarters, but later was repurposed for usage by Minnesota's governors and visiting VIPs. Elmer L. Andersen, governor of Minnesota from 1961 to 1963, gave the building the nickname "Valhalla".

A three-car garage on the grounds was built in 1937 and featured a fireplace which could be used to keep cars warm so they could start during the winter. A barbeque shelter features remains of a building from a 1950 homestead, and original copper lanterns from the 1934 Camp Ripley Post Exchange.

A lightning strike on May 30, 1969, set fire to a nearby pine tree, which then spread to the roof of the lodge. Two bedrooms on the second floor and the central room on the first floor were damaged; mementos left by Harry Truman and Eugene McCarthy were also damaged.

=== Renovation ===
In 2018, the Cultural Resources Management team at Camp Ripley rehabilitated the lodge, working with the Minnesota State Historic Preservation Office. An old photo, dated using magazines visible in the picture, was used to help restore the look of the interior to match from shortly after the construction of the building. Modern windows in a 1930s style were installed, as well as a cedar shake roof matching the original. A new HVAC system was also installed.

== Notable visitors ==
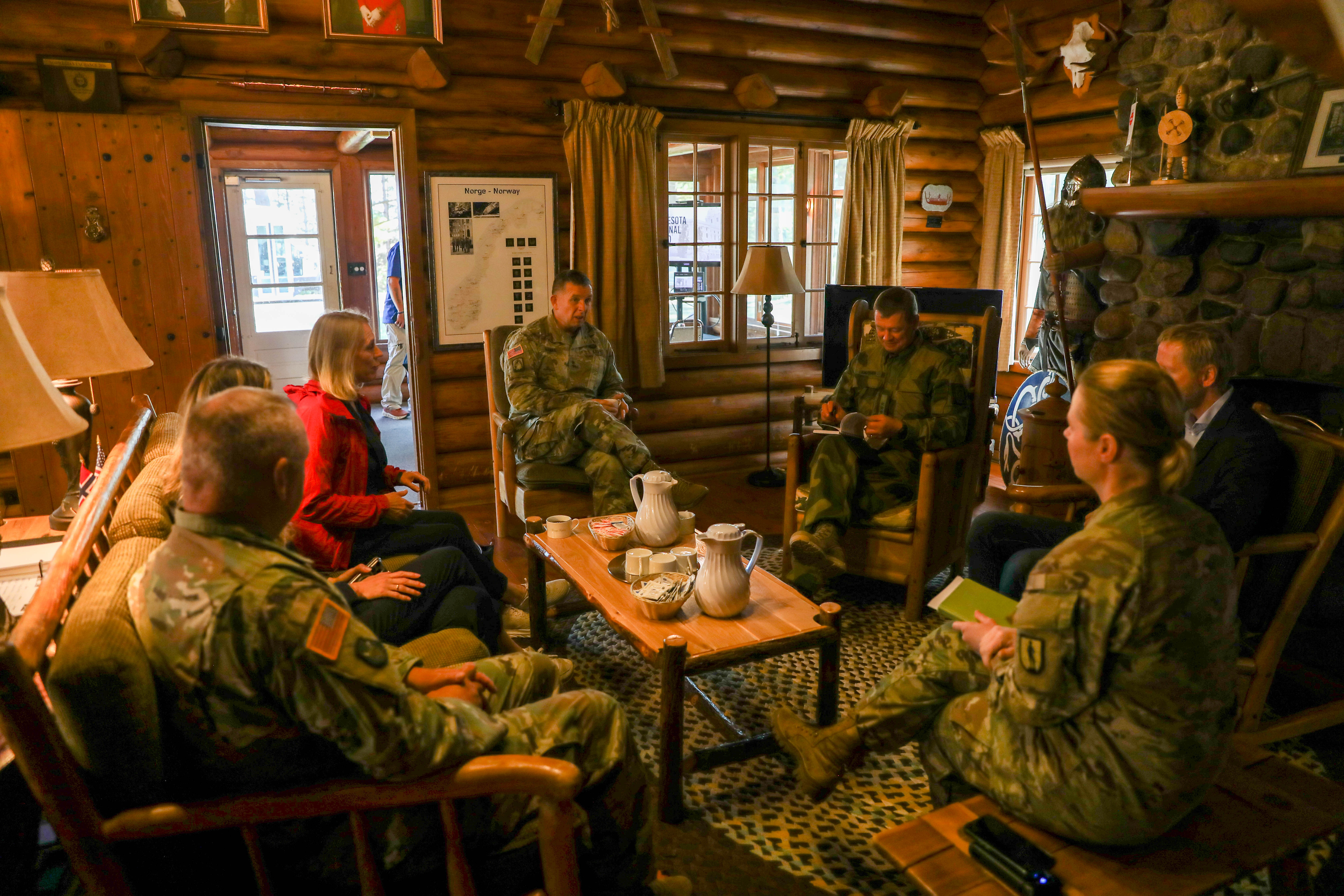
Norwegian Ambassador to the United States Anniken Huitfeldt visiting Valhalla

President Harry Truman stayed at Valhalla twice after he left office: once in August 1953, and a second time in July 1961. On both visits, he observed maneuvers by his former unit, the 35th Infantry Division, and received a 21-gun salute.

Other prominent visitors include U.S. Ambassador to Iceland Karl Rolvaag, Senator Eugene McCarthy, and President of Croatia Kolinda Grabar-Kitarović. As governor, retired professional wrestler Jesse Ventura stated that Valhalla was good reason for him to go to Camp Ripley.
