= Valhall =

Valhall is an anglicized form of Old Norse Valhǫll, an afterlife "hall of the slain" in Norse mythology, which is more commonly anglicized as Valhalla. Otherwise, Valhall may refer to:

- Valhall (band), a Norwegian band
- Valhall oil field, a Norwegian oil field

== See also ==
- Valhalla
- Walhalla (disambiguation)
