= Minnesota State Veterans Cemetery - Duluth =

State Veterans Cemetery in Duluth, Minnesota

- Commemorative wreaths placed on the graves of fallen heroes.
- Interactive map of Minnesota State Veterans Cemetery - Duluth

Details
- Established: 2018
- Location: Saginaw, Minnesota
- Country: United States
- Coordinates: 46°49′14.05″N 92°11′1.933″W
- Type: Public
- Owned by: MN Dept. of Veteran Affairs
- Size: 104 acres (42 ha)
- No. of graves: <1,500
- Website: Official
- Find a Grave: Minnesota State Veterans Cemetery - Duluth

The Minnesota State Veterans Cemetery - Duluth is an active cemetery located in nearby Saginaw, Minnesota, United States. The facility includes an administration and visitor building, committal shelter, and a maintenance building designed by Bentz Thompson Rietow. This cemetery, maintained by the State of Minnesota, includes the graves of more than 1,439 military service members and their family members. At full capacity, the cemetery should accommodate 32,000 plots.

== History ==
In Feb 2016, the State of Minnesota acquired 104 acres for the cemetery after the Minnesota State Legislature authorized the construction of a state cemetery in Duluth. The cemetery was dedicated on Veteran's Day, Nov. 11, 2018.

That same day, the first veteran, Durbin M. Keeney, was laid to rest at the cemetery. Keeney helped establish the cemetery.

Following the construction of the Little Falls cemetery and the Preston cemetery, the Duluth cemetery was the third of four Minnesota state cemeteries. The fourth state veteran's cemetery was dedicated in Redwood Falls.

In May 2026, the cemetery received the National Cemetery Administration's Operational Excellence Award for passing all 95 measured standards.

== Notable Interments ==
- SSgt Durbin M. Keeny (First cemetery interment [11 November 2018], Regional Director Northern Chapter of the Minnesota Assistance Council for Veterans [1998-2011], Vietnam War, USAF)
- PVT Rodney W. Long (First and only WWI Veteran in cemetery, US Army)
- SSG William C. Thomas (Dist. Service Cross, Silver Star, Vietnam War, US Army)
- CWT Robert T. Makowski, IMO (KIA - sinking of the USS Indianapolis, WWII, USN)

== Events ==
- Each May, Memorial Day programs honor fallen service members.
- Each December, Honor Wreaths are placed on gravestones.

== Additional Reading ==
- Duluth’s Veterans Cemetery Is Minnesota’s Newest Sacred Space
- Honoring fallen Service members at State Veterans Cemetery
- New veterans cemetery nears completion
