= Valhalla (2013 film) =

- Film poster
- Directed by: Ben Sturgulewski; Nick Waggoner
- Screenplay by: Ben Sturgulewski; Nick Waggoner
- Produced by: Mike Brown; Zac Ramras
- Starring: Cody Barnhill; Austin Ross
- Cinematography: Ben Sturgulewski
- Edited by: Mike Brown; Ben Sturgulewski; Nick Waggoner
- Production company: Sweetgrass Productions
- Release date: September 13, 2013
- Running time: 64 minutes
- Countries: United States; Canada
- Language: English

Valhalla is a 2013 American/Canadian skiing and snowboarding adventure film directed by Ben Sturgulewski and Nick Waggoner of Sweetgrass Productions. It stars Cody Barnhill and Austin Ross; Kasey Ryne Mazak is the narrator.

== Plot ==
Conrad is driving north in a state of personal crisis when his Volkswagen breaks down and he discovers a hippie ski camp called Valhalla. There he rediscovers the pleasures of playing in the snow.

== Cast ==
- Cody Barnhill as Conrad
- Austin Ross as Skier
- Sierra Quitiquit
- Kasey Ryne Mazak as Japanese Narrator
- Billynaire Cruz as Bar Patron

== Production ==
Valhalla was filmed over two years in Nelson, British Columbia, to combine artistically filmed extreme skiing and snowboarding with the plot. Instead of using helicopters, production involved hiking up to the shooting locations and overnight camping; many local skiers and snowboarders appear, and there is a naked skiing and snowboarding scene. The final scene, in a rainforest, was shot at Mount Baker in Washington state, with snow trucked in.

The film premiered at the Paramount Theatre in Denver, Colorado, on September 13, 2013.
