= Minnesota State Veterans Cemetery - Little Falls =

State Veterans Cemetery in Little Falls, Minnesota

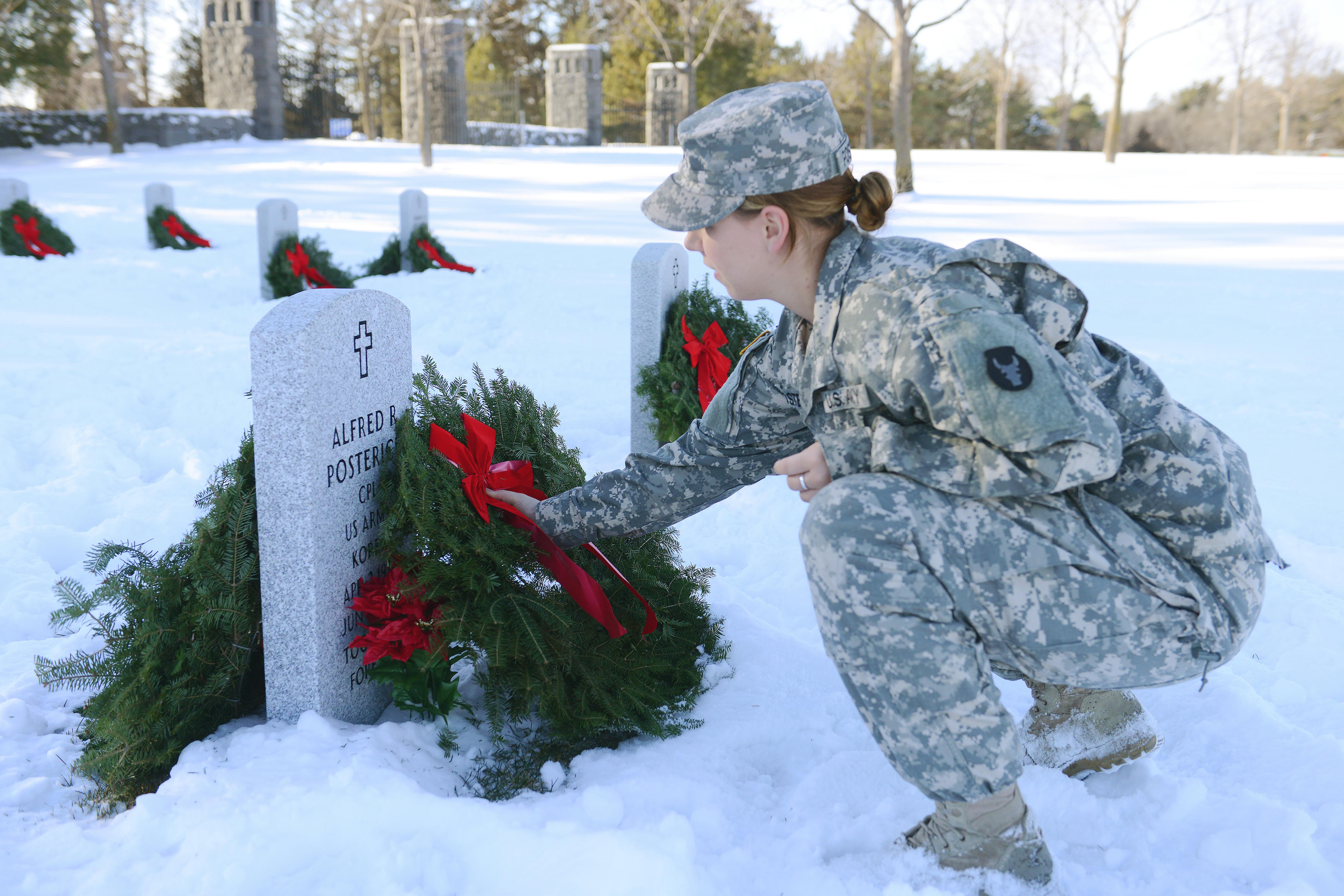
- Soldier places a wreath on grandfather's headstone at the Minnesota State Veterans Cemetery.
- Interactive map of Minnesota State Veterans Cemetery - Little Falls

Details
- Established: 1994
- Location: Camp Ripley, Minnesota, US
- Country: United States
- Coordinates: 46°4′26.717″N 94°19′45.608″W
- Type: Public
- Owned by: MN Dept. of Veteran Affairs
- Size: 37 acres (15 ha)
- No. of graves: >10,000
- Website: Official
- Find a Grave: Minnesota State Veterans Cemetery - Little Falls

The Minnesota State Veterans Cemetery - Little Falls is an active cemetery located adjacent to the Camp Ripley Training Center seven miles north of Little Falls, Minnesota, United States. This cemetery, maintained by the State of Minnesota, includes the graves of more than 10,000 military service members and their family members.

== History ==
In 1986, the Minnesota State Legislature authorized the construction of a state cemetery, as long as state funding was not required. Around $18,900 ($41,055 in 2025) was raised to purchase 38 acres of land. The land was deeded to the state in 1988, but no progress was made on the cemetery. The Minnesota State Veterans Cemetery Association was incorporated in 1991, requested the land back from the state, and began fundraising and developing the land. Ground was ceremoniously broken on 12 Sept., 1992. While not a state-run facility, the cemetery was authorized to bear the official name, and the Minnesota National Guard graded the land as a training exercise. The first burial was on 15 June, 1994; Leonard Lehman, a Korean War veteran from Randall, Minnesota. The cemetery was dedicated on 9 July, 1994, by Governor Arne Carlson. The entire project cost an estimated $325,000.

On 1 Sept., 1994, the state took possession of the cemetery. The cemetery was the first of four Minnesota state cemeteries. The three other state veteran cemeteries are in Duluth, Preston, and Redwood Falls.

In 2011, the first of five military branch paintings were installed in the cemetery's Committal Hall.

In 2021, the cemetery received the National Cemetery Administration's Operational Excellence Award for the highest standards in the nation.

In 2024, the cemetery received a $1.4 mil expansion grant.

== Notable Interments ==
- Colonel Larry J. Herke (Commissioner, Minnesota Department of Veterans Affairs, 2019–2023, US Army)
- Spc George W. Cauley, KIA, Afghanistan, 2009, US Army.
- CPL Leonard A. Lehmann Sr (First cemetery interment [15 June 1994], Korean War, USMC)
- SK3 Alcuin "Al" G. Loehr (Commissioner, Minnesota Dept. of Veterans Affairs, 1965-1969 / Mayor of St. Cloud 1971-1980 / WWII, USN)
- Tech. Sgt. Sylvester Singlestad (Distinguished Service Cross, 135th Infantry, WWII, US Army)
- General John W. Vessey Jr. (Chairman of the Joint Chiefs of Staff, 1982–1985, US Army)

== Events ==
- Each May, Memorial Day programs honor fallen service members.
- Each December, Honor Wreaths are placed on gravestones.

== Additional reading ==
- 4,700 wreaths honor fallen veterans in Minnesota
- Running out of room
- Site challenges prove costly for vets’ cemetery project
