= Lake Valhalla =

Lake in Chelan County, Washington, United States

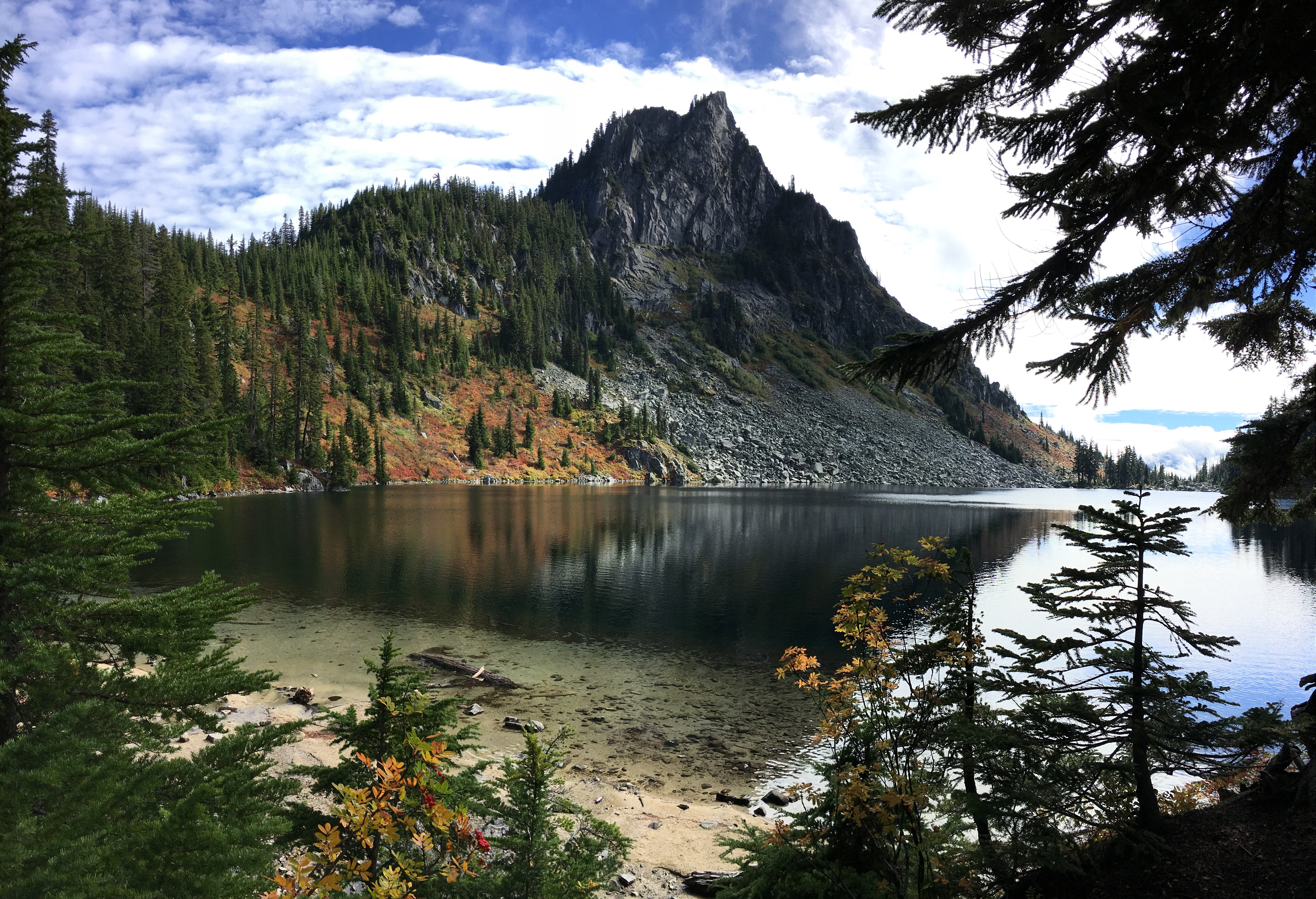
- Lake Valhalla with Lichtenberg Mountain in the background.

- Location within Washington (state) Location within the United States
- Location: Chelan County, Washington
- Coordinates: 47°47′23″N 121°6′3″W
- Basin countries: United States
- Surface area: 24 acres (9.7 ha)
- Surface elevation: 4,836 ft (1,474 m)
- Islands: 0

Lake Valhalla is a glacial lake located in the Okanogan-Wenatchee National Forest of the state of Washington. Positioned adjacent to the Pacific Crest Trail, the lake and its surrounding areas are popular for hiking, climbing and other recreational activities.

== See also ==
- Lichtenberg Mountain
- Mount McCausland
