= USS Minneapolis =

Two ships of the United States Navy have been named for the city of Minneapolis in Minnesota:

- USS Minneapolis (C-13), was a cruiser in service from 1894 to 1921
- USS Minneapolis (CA-36), was a heavy cruiser commissioned in 1934, in heavy action throughout the Pacific War, and decommissioned in 1947

== See also ==
- USS Saint Paul
- USS Minneapolis–Saint Paul
