= Camp Ripley =

Military and civilian training facility in Minnesota, US

- Morrison County, Minnesota, US
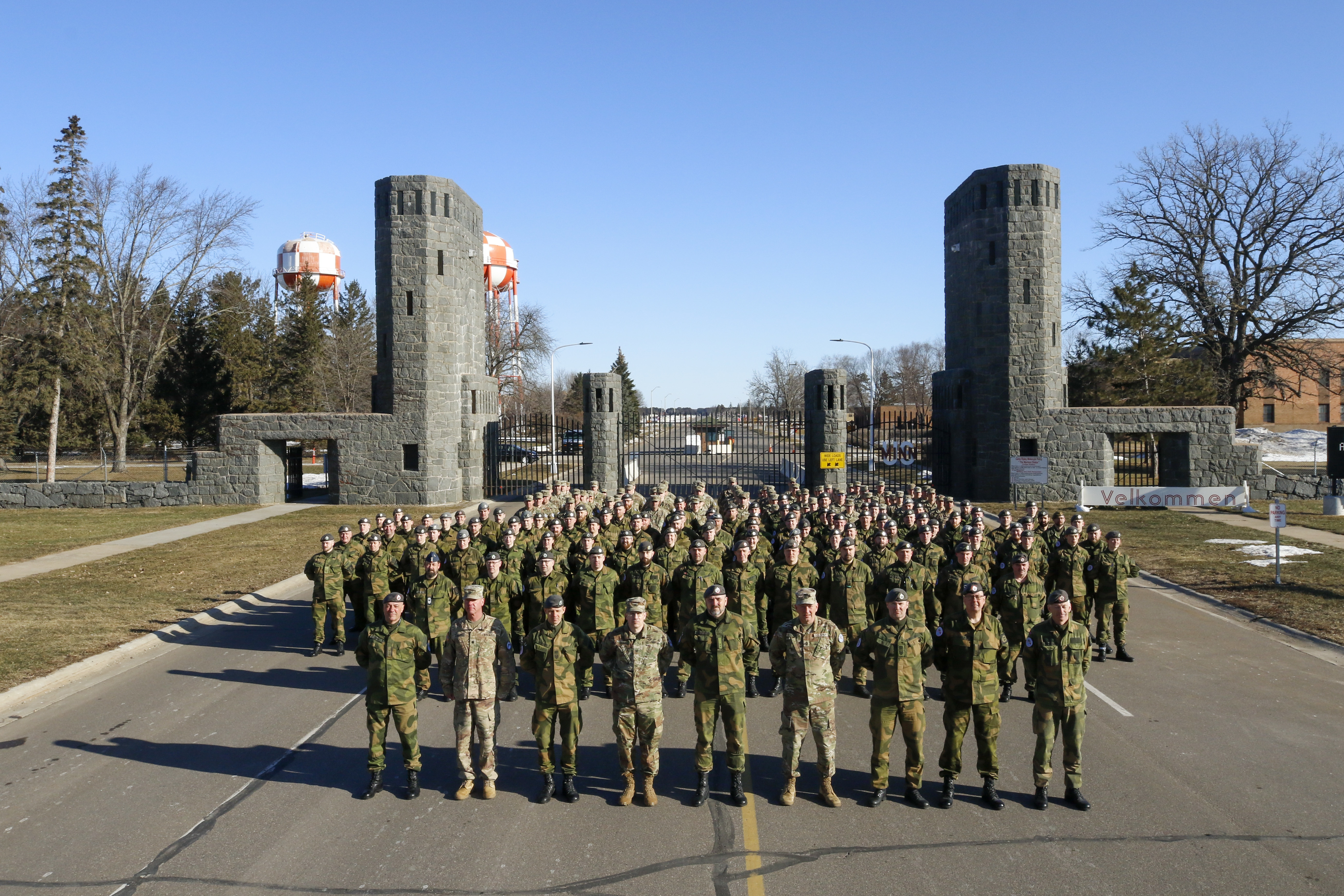
- NOREX Troop Exchange at the Camp Ripley Main Gate

Site information
- Owner: State of Minnesota
- Controlled by: Minnesota National Guard
- Open to the public: Yes

Location
- Coordinates: 46.0759°N 94.3474°W

Site history
- Built: 1930
- In use: Yes

Airfield information
- Identifiers: ICAO: KRYM, FAA LID: RYM
- Elevation: 350 metres (1,148 ft) AMSL
Runways
Direction	Length and surface
13/31	1,859 metres (6,099 ft) asphalt
15/33	268 metres (879 ft) asphalt
132/312	1,219 metres (3,999 ft) gravel

Camp Ripley is a 53,000-acre (210 km^{2}) military and civilian training facility operated by the Minnesota National Guard near the city of Little Falls in the central part of the Minnesota, United States. The location of the camp was selected in 1929 by Ellard A. Walsh, Adjutant General of the State of Minnesota. The site's winter warfare training course is the primary facility used by the National Guard for winter combat exercises. Camp Ripley also hosts the training academy for the Minnesota State Patrol and is a popular site for athletes training to compete in winter biathlons. Most Minnesota Guard soldiers train at Camp Ripley during two-week annual training periods.

The Minnesota State Veterans Cemetery - Little Falls is located adjacent to Camp Ripley.

== History of Camp Ripley ==
The site for Camp Ripley was first approved following World War I in 1929. The State of Minnesota purchased 12,000 acres (49 km^{2}) of land to be used for military training. The site was officially named Camp Ripley in December 1930. It was named after Fort Ripley, a frontier fort that had been closed by the Federal Government in 1877. The fort was named for Brigadier General Eleazar Wheelock Ripley, a hero of the War of 1812. The remains of Fort Ripley are contained within the camp's property boundaries. The first soldiers that came to train at Camp Ripley stayed in tents, thus, training was only possible in the summer months. The government started to see that it was not beneficial to use tents year round while training, so they constructed buildings. There are now many historic buildings at Camp Ripley. An example is Valhalla, the governor's lodge. President Harry S. Truman stayed there twice, as did Senator Eugene McCarthy. When the lodge is not being used by the governor, it is used for other VIP guests.

In 1951, the Minnesota Legislature approved the purchasing of more land by Camp Ripley. After the purchase they then had 45,000 acres (180 km^{2}) of land. Camp Ripley slowly bought more land and now has 53,000 acres (210 km^{2}).

On March 13, 1993, two UH-1 "Huey" helicopters collided in a training accident over Camp Ripley, killing 5 and injuring 2. It remains the deadliest crash in Minnesota National Guard history. They have since been added to the MN National Guard Court of Honor. Tower 5 was later dedicated to them.

== Airfield ==
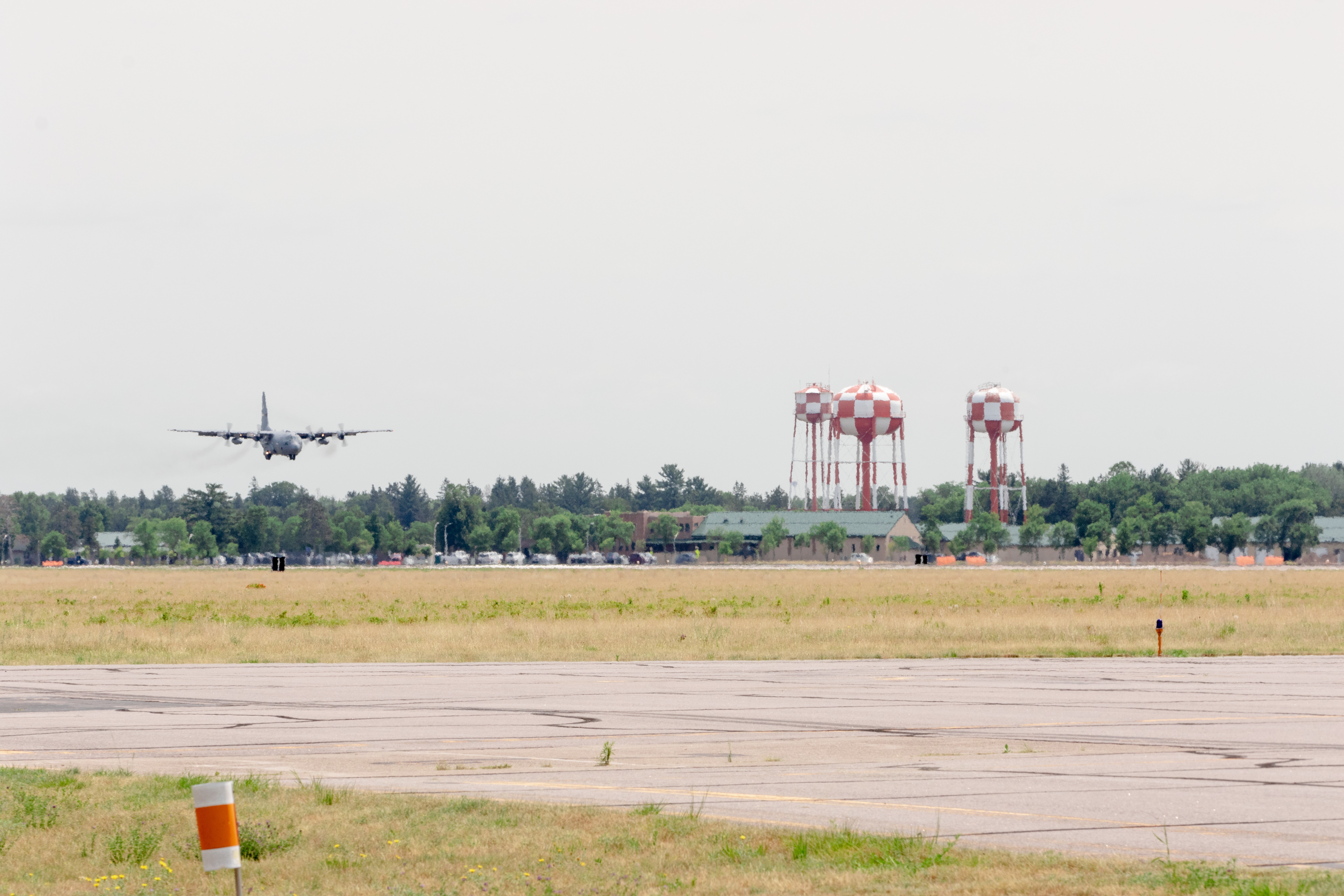
A C-130 landing at Camp Ripley

The Miller Army Airfield is also located at the camp. It was built in 1933. Named for Raymond S. Miller, it includes a 6,100-foot (1,900 m) paved runway capable of accommodating C-130 aircraft. Construction on the asphalt runway capable of landing C-130 aircraft began in 1980 and was completed in 1981. There are also five drop zones for training for the release of cargo and personnel from aircraft. The airfield's FAA identifier is KRYM.

The original hangar, now used as an event space and the Viking Club restaurant and bar, was built in 1932.

== Camp Ripley State Training Facility ==
Camp Ripley is the training site for the National Guard, Minnesota State Patrol, Minnesota Wing of the Civil Air Patrol, Minnesota DNR, Minnesota State Fire Marshal (Minnesota Board of Firefighter Training and Education), and Foreign exchange programs. The Army Reserve often trains at Camp Ripley during the summer.

The camp is a state game refuge with resources managed cooperatively by the Department of Military Affairs and Department of Natural Resources. It also houses the Minnesota Military & Veterans Museum, a museum that is open for the public and military personnel. Also on the grounds is the site of Fort Ripley, a military post established in 1848—the second ever built in Minnesota—to keep the peace among the Dakota, Ojibwe, and Ho-Chunk peoples.

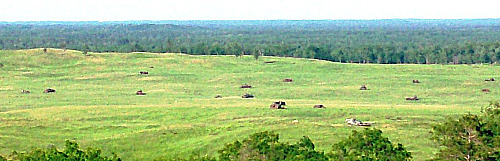
One of Camp Ripley's ranges

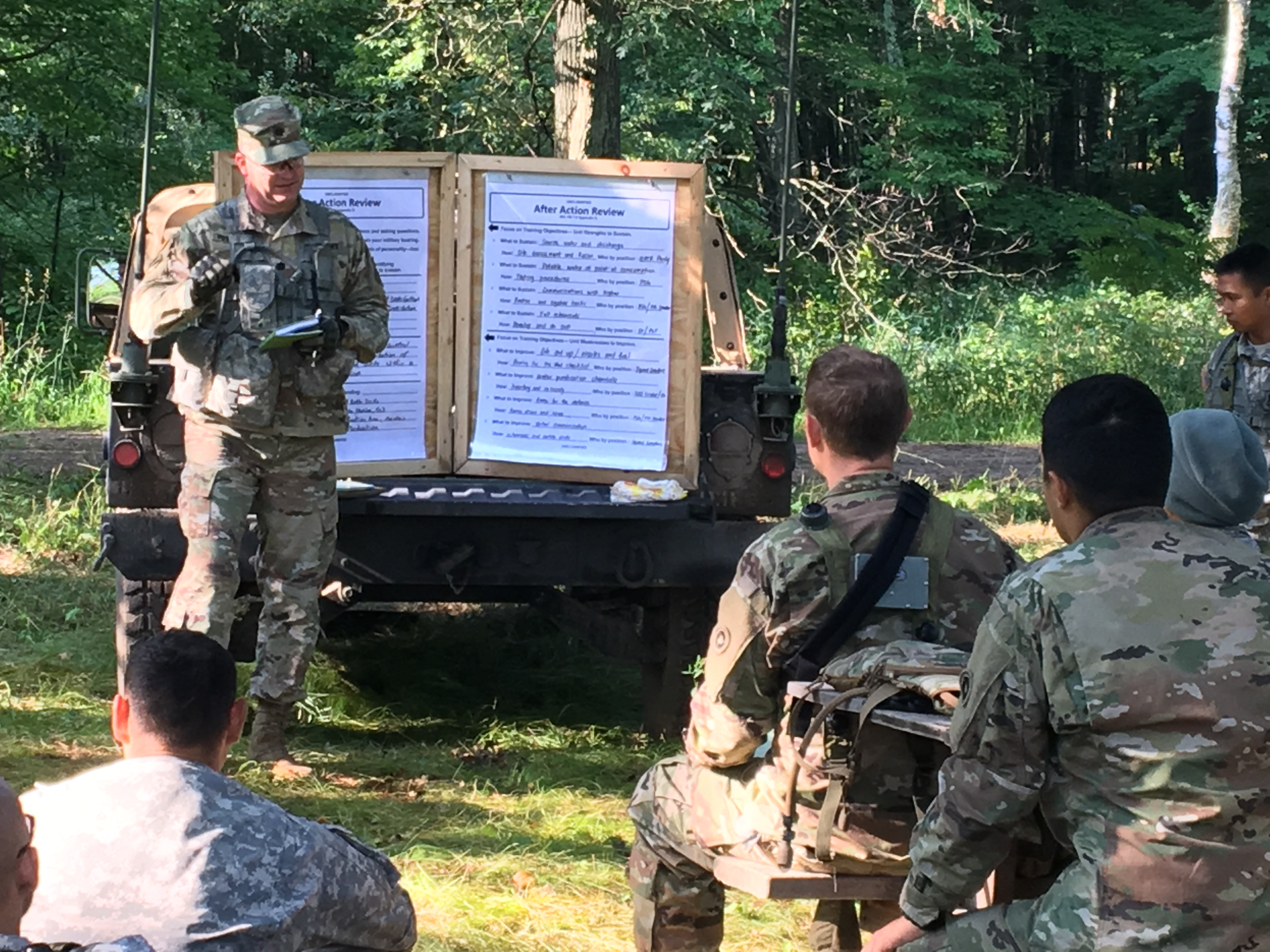
An Observer/Controller-Trainer conducts a formal After-action review for a Reserve unit

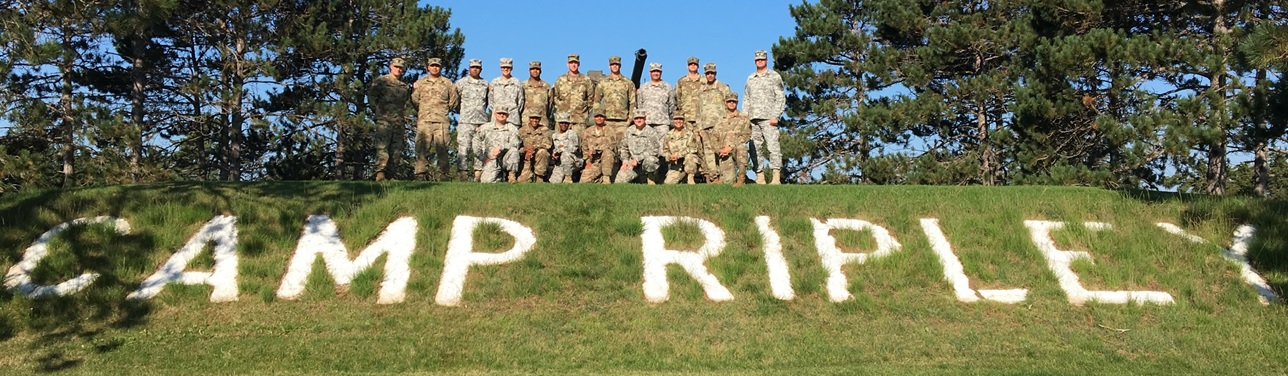
Unit photo at the entry to Camp Ripley

=== National Guard training ===
Camp Ripley has small arms and tank ranges, maneuver training areas capable of supporting heavy brigade, and special operation training facilities. Examples of the special operation training facilities are: Three drop zones, rappel tower, confidence course, water training areas, two prisoner of war compounds, and many more.

Camp Ripley has a fully equipped winter training area. It is the National Guard's premier cold weather training site in the United States. There are: Biathlon courses, groomed cross country ski paths, special cold weather equipment, down hill ski slopes and all-weather ranges.

=== Foreign exchange program ===
In addition to being used by the United States military, it sees regular visitors from Canada, the Netherlands, and the United Kingdom. Camp Ripley also hosts forces from Croatia and Norway in support of the State Partnership Program. The Norwegian Reciprocal Troop Exchange, or NOREX, began as "a handshake" in 1973. Each year, troops of the Norwegian Home Guard train at Camp Ripley and troops from the Minnesota National Guard train at Værnes Air Station.

=== DNR, State Fire Marshal, Transportation and State Patrol training ===
Camp Ripley houses the Department of Natural Resources Enforcement Center. DNR Conservation Officers are trained year-round in Camp Ripley's diverse habitat. They train by practicing controlled burns and studying the habitat.

Camp Ripley hosts many State Fire training classes; including response, live fire burn exercises, apparatus driving maneuvers, and fire investigations throughout the year.

Camp Ripley hosts the Minnesota Department of Transportation Snow and Ice snow plowing training each summer.

Camp Ripley has been the host for the Minnesota State Patrol Academy since 1996. The men and women who train to become state patrol officers practice their shooting skills on one of Camp Ripley's ranges and practice driving maneuvers.

== Minnesota Army National Guard Court of Honor ==
The Court of Honor is located on the grounds of the Minnesota Military & Veterans Museum at Camp Ripley. It honors members of the Minnesota Army National Guard and other military and civilian personnel from Minnesota who have attained uncommon prestige. Inductions have been conducted since 1933 and annually since 2009. The court honors more than 500 individuals. Notable inductees include Archbishop John Ireland, MG George E. Leach, GEN John W. Vessey Jr. and twelve of the Medal of Honor recipients from Minnesota.

== Green Prairie Cemetery ==
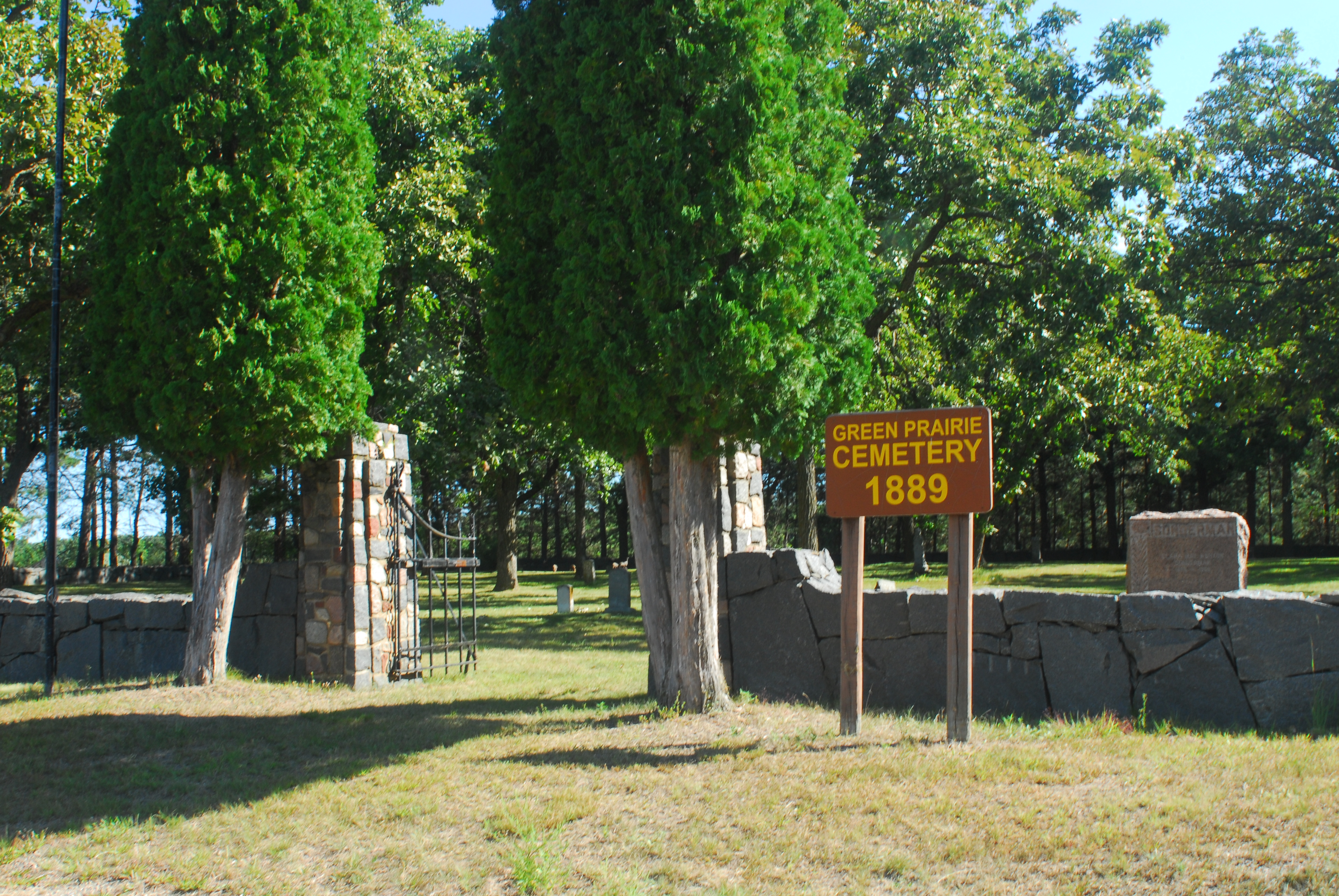
Green Prairie Cemetery

Green Prairie Cemetery is an historic cemetery, on land that was formerly part of Green Prairie Township, and is now within the grounds of Camp Ripley. It is located between the post chapel and the Range Control office. The cemetery is maintained by the Camp Ripley grounds crews and includes the graves of local civilians and military service members.

Established in 1889 as a public cemetery, Green Prairie was on land later purchased for Camp Ripley's cantonment area. The cemetery includes graves that predate the 1889 plat filing. The dry-laid black granite walls, like the gate and perimeter walls of Camp Ripley, were Works Progress Administration (WPA) projects, during the Great Depression in the 1930s. The gateposts of mortared fieldstone secure iron gates. In 1935, a federal grant of $77,772 paid for beautification and repair. In 1975, the most distinguished characteristic of the cemetery, the marble Walsh crypt, was installed. A number of other cemeteries and individual burials are also located on Camp Riley, within its range area. Notable interments include Maj. Gen. Ellard A. Walsh- 34th Infantry Division commander, Minnesota National Guard Adjutant General, and president of the National Guard Association of the United States.

== Leaders ==
Senior Commanders
- BG Lowell E. Kruse, 2017 – 2022

Garrison Commanders

- COL Troy Fink, 2023 – present
- COL Bryce Erickson, 2022
- COL Joshua Simer, 2019 – 2021
- COL Brian J. Melton, 2017 – 2019
- COL Scott A. St. Sauver, 2010 – 2017
- COL Richard A. Weaver, 2003 – 2010
- COL Terry J. Dorenbush, 2000 – 2003
- COL Rick D. Erlandson, 1997 – 2000
- COL Elwin L. Kropuenske, 1992 – 1997
- COL Benton D. Murdock, 1990 – 1992
- COL Gary E. LeBlanc, 1986 – 1990
- COL Richard L. Hayes, 1981 – 1986
- COL Lawrence R. Kiefer 1980 – 1981
- COL John W. Hohncke, 1973 – 1980
- COL Robert L. Moeglein, 1965 – 1973
- COL Dean K. Torney, 1959 – 1965
- COL Raymond A. Rossberg, 1932 – 1958

Command Sergeants Major

- CSM Chad Turner, 2026 – present
- CSM Rian Hofstad, 2023 – 2026
- CSM Marcus Erickson, 2018 – 2022
- CSM Matthew C. Erickson, 2017 – 2019
- CSM Michael P. Worden, 2012 – 2017
- CSM Daniel R. Smith, 2008 – 2012
- CSM Douglas R. Hanson, 2003 – 2008
- CSM Larry W. Helsene, 1998 – 2003
- CSM Robert A. Thome, 1996 – 1998
- CSM Robert L. Boone, 1993 – 1995
- CSM Mike Manion, 1991 – 1993
- CSM Dale L. Chisholm, 1986 – 1990
- CSM Vern Rubey, 1984 – 1986
