= Minnesota Department of Veterans Affairs =

Department overview
- Formed: 1943
- Preceding department: Minnesota Veterans Home agency
- Jurisdiction: Minnesota
- Headquarters: W 12th St, Saint Paul, Minnesota
- Department executive: Brad Lindsay, Commissioner
- Website: mn.gov/mdva/home/index.jsp

The Minnesota Department of Veterans Affairs (MDVA) is a state agency that provides services to current and former members of the United States military. The department provides care and housing through eight veterans homes located in Bemidji, Fergus Falls, Hastings, Luverne, Minneapolis, Montevideo, Preston and Silver Bay. The department also assists veterans in obtaining healthcare, education, special veterans benefits and burials at four State Veterans Cemeteries located in Duluth, Little Falls, Preston and Redwood Falls. The agency works with the United States Federal Veterans Administration Hospitals and Clinics including the Minneapolis VA Health Care System as well as coordination with the Minnesota National Guard and the American Legion.

== Functions ==
The agency provides an important resources for veterans returning from active duty as well as retired military members who need health or other services that are provided by the government for their service to the state.

== History ==
In 1887 the first state veterans home was created and funded by the legislature for military members returning from the US Civil War. It was called the Minnesota Soldiers' Home and its purpose was to provide health care and housing to former soldiers. An additional state agency called the Soldiers Welfare Bureau was created to administer special benefits for soldiers in 1925. Subsequently, the Soldiers Welfare Bureau was combined with the Minnesota Department of Veterans Affairs in 1943 by an act of the Minnesota Legislature. In 2007 the Minnesota Veterans Homes were placed under the administration of the Minnesota Department of Veterans Affairs.

== See also ==
- Minneapolis VA Health Care System
