= Ray Miller =

Ray or Raymond Miller may refer to:

== Military and politics ==
- Ray Miller (Ohio legislator) (1948/1949–2026), Democratic member of the Ohio Senate and the Ohio House of Representatives
- Ray T. Miller (1893–1966), Ohio politician; mayor of Cleveland, Ohio; chairman of the Cuyahoga County Democratic Party
- Raymond S. Miller (1891–1961), United States general and military aviation pioneer
- Ray Miller (Oklahoma politician) (born 1950), American politician; member of the Oklahoma House of Representatives

== Sports ==
- Ray Miller (baseball manager) (1945–2021), player, manager and coach in Major League Baseball
- Ray Miller (first baseman) (1888–1927), infielder in Major League Baseball
- Ray Miller (boxer) (1905–1987), American boxer and referee

== Misc ==
- Ray Miller (bandleader) (1896–1974), American bandleader in the 1920s
- Ray Miller (actor), actor in Daredevils of the Red Circle
- Ray Miller (singer) (1941–2024), German singer
