= 109th Airlift Squadron =

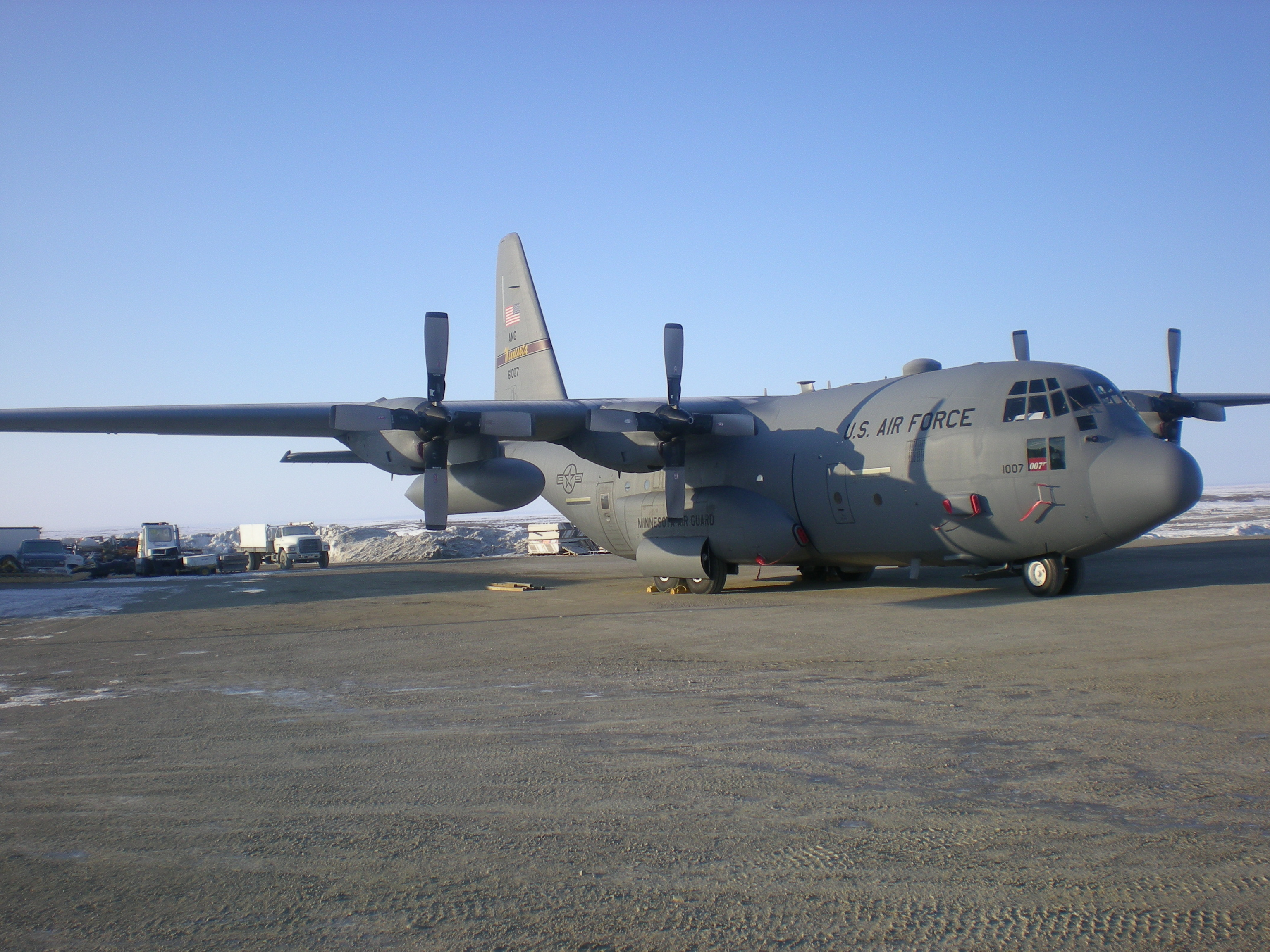
- 109th Airlift Squadron C-130 in Cambridge Bay, Nunavut, prior to airlifting the Mars Institute Humvee
- Active: 1917–1919; 1921–1952; 1952–1971; 1971–present
- Country: United States
- Allegiance: Minnesota
- Branch: Air National Guard
- Type: Squadron
- Role: Airlift
- Part of: Minnesota Air National Guard
- Garrison/HQ: Minneapolis–Saint Paul Joint Air Reserve Station, Minnesota
- Engagements: World War I European Theater of Operations
- Decorations: Distinguished Unit Citation Belgian Fourragère

Insignia
- 109th Airlift Squadron emblem (Note: Reinstated 15 December 1965.)

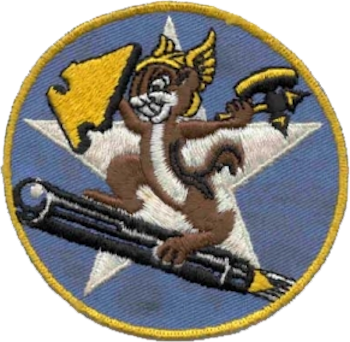
- 109th Fighter-Interceptor Squadron emblem (Note: Approved 17 July 1959.)

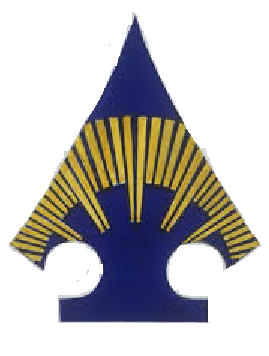
- 109th Observation Squadron emblem (Note: Approved 7 March 1939.)

The 109th Airlift Squadron is a unit of the Minnesota Air National Guard 133d Airlift Wing located at Minneapolis–Saint Paul Joint Air Reserve Station, Minnesota. The squadron is equipped with the C-130H Hercules.

The 109th AS is the oldest unit in the Minnesota Air National Guard, having over 90 years of service to the state and nation. It is a descendant organization of the World War I 109th Aero Squadron, established on 27 August 1917. It was reformed on 17 January 1921, as the 109th Observation Squadron, being the first of 29 National Guard aviation squadrons to receive federal recognition following World War I.

== History ==
=== World War I ===
The 109th Airlift Squadron traces its origins to the 109th Aero Squadron, organized on 28 August 1917 at Kelly Field, Texas. The men of the squadron were from almost every section of the United States, recruited largely though the Columbus Barracks, Ohio and the Recruit Depot at Fort Thomas, Kentucky. At Kelly Field, the squadron was put into indoctrination training, with drills, hikes, guard duty, fatigue work and other things that are done in military training camps. Once basic indoctrination training was completed, the 109th was ordered for overseas duty, being ordered to report to the Aviation Concentration Center, Garden City, Long Island on 24 October. It was there that final arrangements were made for the trip overseas, complete equipment was drawn and a final few transfers were made. The squadron left Garden City on 7 December 1917 in a train bound for St. John's, Newfoundland, arriving on 10 December. There, it boarded the SS Tuscania and proceeded across the Atlantic and arrived at Liverpool, England on 26 December. It then moved by train to the English Channel port of Southampton, where it waited at a Rest Camp for several days before crossing to Le Havre, France on 28 December. It again waited for transportation at Le Havre before finally arriving at the Replacement Concentration Center, AEF, St. Maixent Replacement Barracks, France, arriving on 2 January 1918.

On 17 January 1918, the squadron was again moved, this time to Romorantin Aerodrome, in central France. There, along with the 75th Aero Construction Squadron and the 116th Aero Squadron, it was part of the first regular detachments of Americans to be stationed at the airfield. It was quartered in French barracks at the Camp de Bluets, on the outskirts of the town of Romorantin. Members of the squadrons were at once put into construction work to develop the Air Service Production Center No. 2. Work was performed in erecting buildings and also the construction of a railroad line into the camp next to the airfield. After several weeks of basic construction at the camp, much of the work was transferred to Chinese laborers who began to arrive and the Americans were placed in charge of details of these workers. On 1 February, the designation of the squadron was changed from the 107th to the 802d Aero Squadron.

The squadron was reassigned to the Transportation Division, Air Service on 20 February, its work becoming the construction of the first vehicle repair shop on the field, installing machinery. Large qualities of vehicles had begun to arrive, and the men were put to work in their assembly. Automobile trucks, trailers, tractors and over vehicles were continually arriving damaged from the front and this equipment was either salvaged or repaired. Some squadron members were assigned to duty with the Railway and Marine Sub-Divisions and assisted in the operation of the narrow-gauge line between Romorantin and Pruniers. Also, as part of the Transportation Division, many of the men were detailed for Convoy Duty. At one time or another, every man in the squadron did duty as a driver of some kind of motor vehicle. This work consisted in conveying truck trains loaded with various kinds of materiel, supplies and equipment from the various Base Ports along the coast and the supply depots in France to places along the front from Belgium to the American sector in Alsace-Lorraine. During the early spring of 1918, a large detachment of men from the 802d was sent to Orly Field, near Paris. For several months, these men were attached to several French Army units as truck drivers, and in this capacity, made frequent trips to the Front and were often under enemy fire. Also, the detachment around Paris was constantly subject to German air raids directed at Paris, and many of the men were in Paris when the "Grand Bertha" long range artillery was using the Eiffel tower as an aiming point.

Many of the men narrowly escaped death while being in and around Paris at the time, as well as the convoy duty to the front and back to Orly. When the great German drives threatened to smash the lines north of Paris in March and later in the summer of 1918, members of the squadron did their bit in moving troops, hauling ammunition and supplies to the front, while others worked at the depots loading trucks and being prepared to help in the evacuation of Paris if necessary.

When the American Army halted the Germans' big drive at Chateau Thierry, for many days members of the 803d assisted in moving troops and supplies to the front lines and in transporting the wounded to the rear. On this and numerous other occasions they also helped the civilian population in escaping from the battle lines.

During the summer of 1918, members of the squadron not assigned to convoy work were kept busy at Romorantin repairing and assembling vehicles. On many occasions the men worked day and night to fill rush orders from the front for equipment. During October 1918, almost all members of the squadron, with the exception of 40 men retained for convoy duty, were reassigned to the airplane shops at Romorantin. In these shops, the men assisted in the assembly of Dayton-Wright DH-4 "Liberty" planes, recently arrived by ship from the United States.

After the signing of the Armistice with Germany on 11 November, the entire squadron was again assigned to transportation and convoy duty, this time performing collection of equipment from front-line units and also moving personnel back from the lines. The 803d returned to the United States in late May 1918. Arrived at Mitchel Field, New York, where the squadron members were demobilized and returned to civilian life.

=== Minnesota National Guard ===
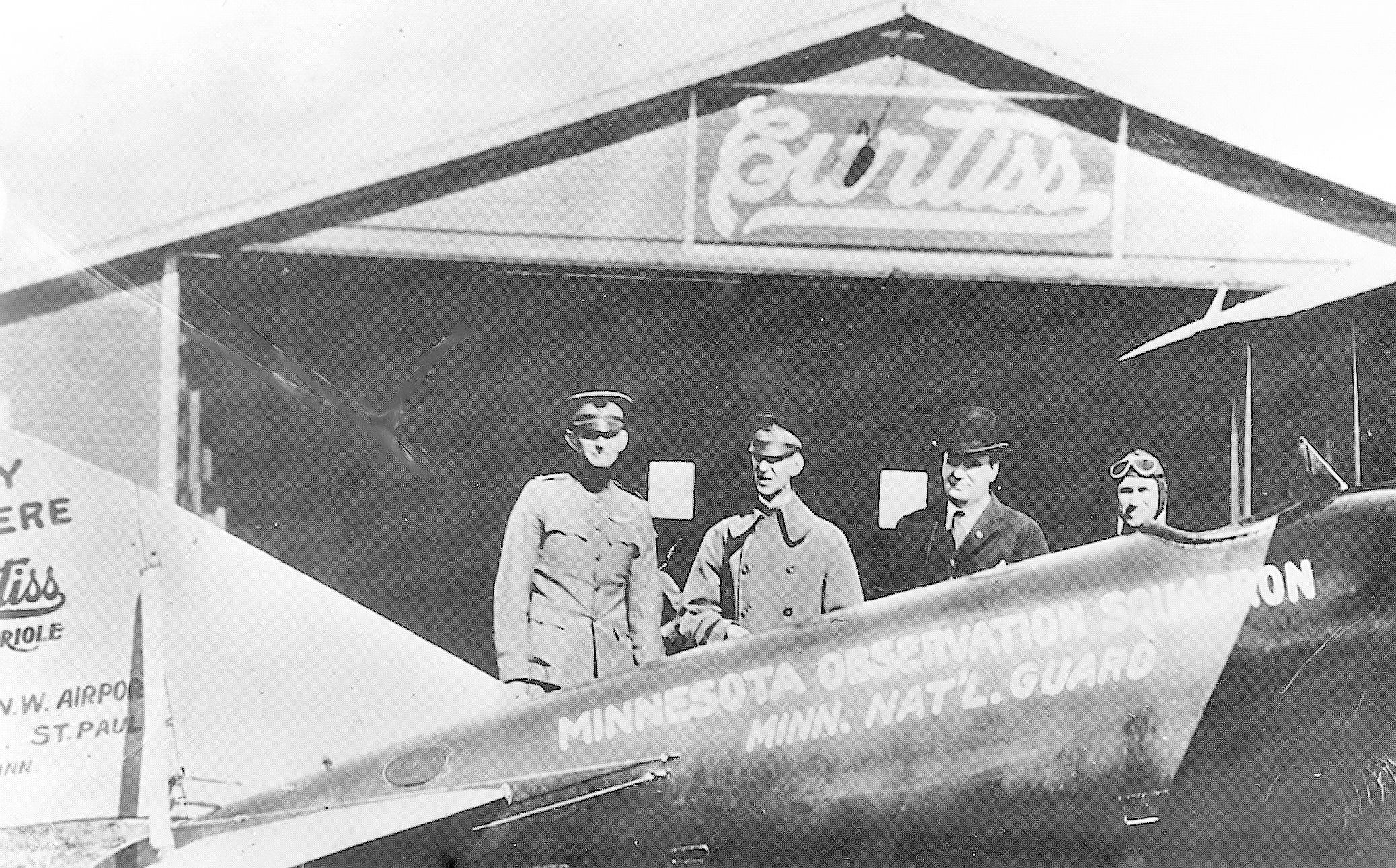
Captain Raymond S. Miller prepares for the historic flight from St. Paul, Minnesota to Washington, D.C., in a rented Curtiss Oriole biplane, with plans for the first air unit of the post-World War I National Guard observation unit, 26 September 1920.

In 1920 the Minnesota National Guard organized an aviation squadron, the 109th, on paper. On 26 September 1920 the Adjutant General, the Assistant Adjutant General, and Captain Ray S. Miller rented a Curtiss Oriole biplane to launch an 8-day flight to Washington D.C. Their aim was to have the 109th Observation Squadron recognised as the first federally recognized National Guard flying squadron. Subsequently, the 109th Observation Squadron, the predecessor to today's Minnesota Air National Guard, passed muster inspection, and was federally recognized by the Militia Department on 17 January 1921. It was the first National Guard aviation squadron to receive federal recognition following the First World War. On recognition or beforehand the squadron was assigned as a divisional observation unit for the 34th Division of the National Guard.

It began flight operations, flying the JN-6H "Jennys" in 1923. The 109th had nine aircraft in their inventory, and the Jenny was the first aircraft assigned the 109th Observation Squadron in 1922. However, before they would receive the "Jennys" the squadron had to move from Curtiss Field in St. Paul to Speedway Field in Minneapolis. The 109th flew out of Speedway Field, a former auto race track. Jennys were flown by the 109th through the end of 1927.

=== World War II ===
It was called to federal duty in 1941 (World War II). The 109th Observation Squadron was assigned to the 67th Observation Group at Esler Field, Louisiana in August 1941. The Squadron flew antisubmarine patrols along the Gulf of Mexico coastline after the Japanese attack on Pearl Harbor.

The 109th was transferred to the European Theater of Operations (ETO), August–October 1942, becoming part of the VIII Fighter Command of Eighth Air Force and then in late 1943 it came under the command of the IX Fighter Command of Ninth Air Force. In May 1943 it was renamed into the 109th Reconnaissance Squadron and then the 109th Tactical Reconnaissance Squadron in November 1943 and then another name change in 1945 to the 109th Reconnaissance Squadron. In addition to flying photo reconnaissance missions in support of the strategic bombing missions in the ETO, the 109th flew photo reconnaissance missions in preparation for the D-Day landing at Normandy. The squadron also flew photo reconnaissance missions over the V-1 bomb sites in France.

The squadron returned to the US in September 1945 and was inactivated in March 1946.

=== Minnesota Air National Guard ===
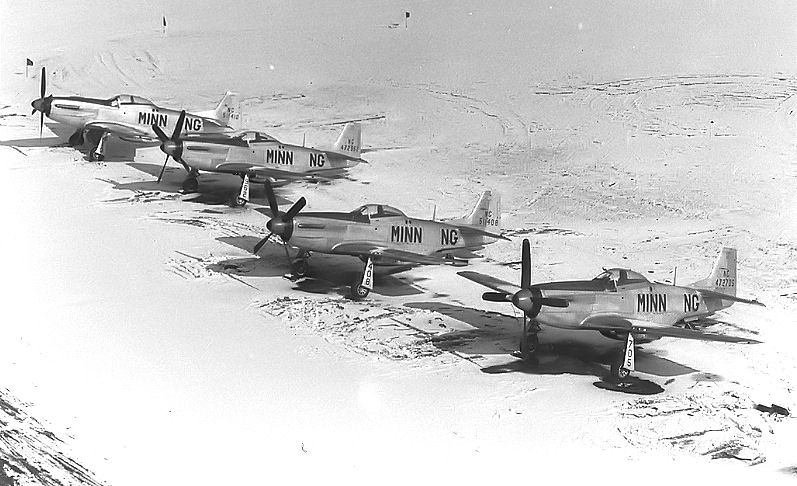
109th Fighter Squadron F-51Ds in the late 1940s

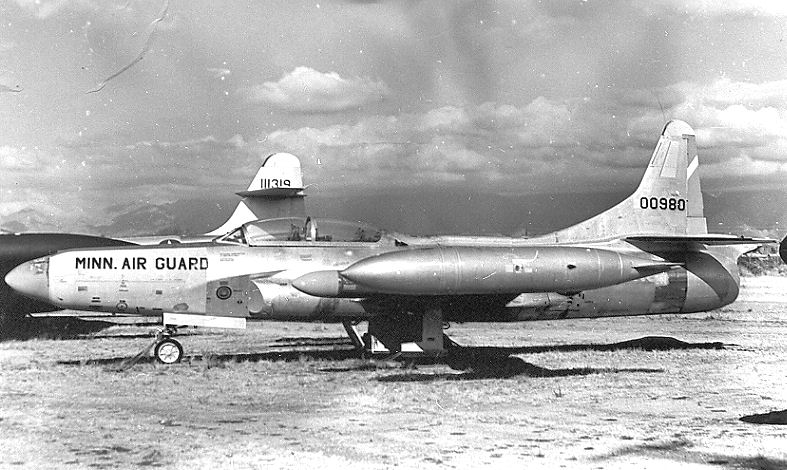
F-94C 50-980, about 1958, 109th Fighter-Interceptor Squadron

The 109th Tactical Reconnaissance Squadron was reactivated as the 109th Fighter Squadron and allotted to the National Guard on 24 May 1946. It was organized at Wold-Chamberlain Field, Minneapolis, and was extended federal recognition on 28 August 1947. The 109th Fighter Squadron was equipped with F-51D Mustangs and was assigned to the 133d Fighter Group. The new unit's mission was the air defense of Minnesota.

==== Air defense ====
On 2 March 1951 the 109th was federalized and brought to active-duty due to the Korean War. It remained assigned to the 133d Fighter-Interceptor Group and initially was moved to Holman Field, St. Paul when activated. It was returned to Wold-Chamberlain Field, Minneapolis on 28 June for the remainder of its activation. It was reassigned to the Air Defense Command (ADC) 31st Air Division on 6 February 1952, and returned to the control of the State of Minnesota on 1 December 1952.

After the Korean War, the squadron was re-formed by 1 January 1953 and resumed its air defense mission. Was upgraded by ADC in 1954 to the dedicated F-94A Starfire all-weather interceptor. With this new aircraft, the mission of the 109th Fighter-Interceptor Squadron changed from day interceptor to day and night all-weather interceptor. In 1958 the 109th again upgraded to the improved F-89H Scorpion.

==== Strategic airlift ====
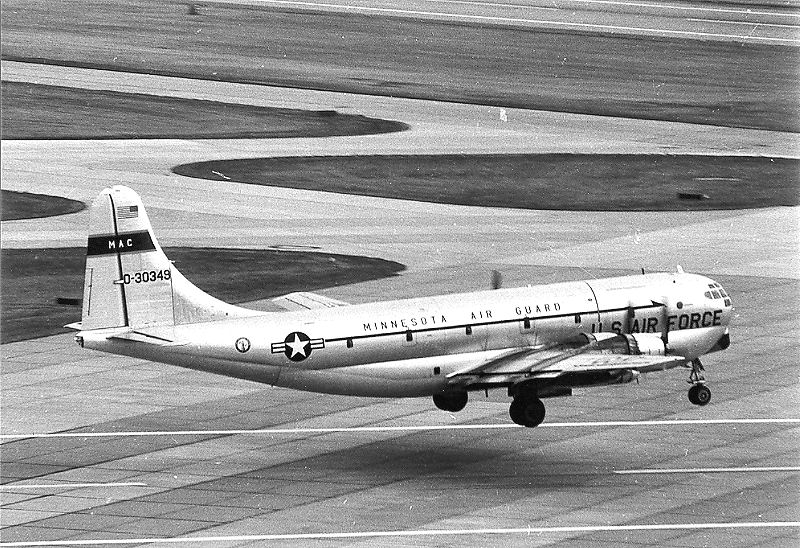
109th MAS C-97G 53-348, about 1966

In 1960, the 109th was reassigned to Military Air Transport Service (MATS), trading in its air defense interceptors for 4-engines C-97 Stratofreighter transports. With air transportation recognized as a critical wartime need, the unit was re-designated the 133d Air Transport Group (Heavy). During the 1961 Berlin Crisis, both the Group and squadron were federalized on 1 October 1961. From Minneapolis, the 109th ATS augmented MATS airlift capability worldwide in support of the Air Force's needs. It returned again to Minnesota state control on 31 August 1962. Throughout the 1960s, the unit flew long-distance transport missions in support of Air Force requirements, frequently sending aircraft to Hawaii, Japan, the Philippines, and during the Vietnam War, to both South Vietnam, Okinawa and Thailand.

==== Tactical airlift ====
The C-97s were retired in 1971 and the squadron was transferred to Tactical Air Command (TAC). It transitioned to the C-130A Hercules theater transport, flying missions in support of TAC throughout the United States and Alaska. In 1974 the unit was returned to Military Airlift Command (MAC) when TAC transferred out its troop carrier mission. In the early 1970s, USAF's "Total Force" policy brought the wing into full partnership with its Air Force counterparts by mandating co-operation and teamwork between Air Guard and active duty Air Force units in all phases of military airlift operations. As a result, in succeeding years the unit's C-130s traveled to all corners of the world, airlifting troops, passengers, and cargo during training missions, exercise deployments, and real-world military operations to support Federal and State military airlift requirements.

The unit has been upgraded over the years with newer C-130E aircraft in 1981 and currently flies the C-130H, which it received in 1995. 2011 marked the 90th anniversary of the 1921 decision to make Minnesota's 109th Aero Squadron the first federally recognized National Guard flying unit in the country. To commemorate the heritage of the Minnesota Air National Guard, the 133d Airlift Wing hosted an Air Expo, welcoming upwards of 15,000 members of the community to the base to celebrate.

During 2011, the 109th Airlift Squadron deployed 528 Airmen to 17 countries, serving in support of U.S. operations worldwide, including humanitarian missions to Africa, Honduras and Indonesia. The squadron provides combat-ready air crews, support personnel, and aircraft for the airlift of passengers and cargo anywhere in the world. Upon direction of the Governor, the unit furnishes personnel and equipment, including aircraft, to assist in natural disaster relief or to safeguard life and property in Minnesota. In 2025, the unit was assigned new C-130J-30 Super Hercules transports, scheduled for delivery in fall 2026.

== Lineage ==
803d Aero Squadron

- Organized as the 109th Aero Squadron on 27 August 1917 (Note: This squadron is not related to the 109th Aero Squadron that was organized at Rich Field in March 1918, moved to Carlstrom Field, Florida, and then to Dorr Field, Florida, in April, was designated Squadron B, Dorr Field in July and was demobilied in November 1918.)

Redesignated as 109th Aero Squadron (Repair) on 18 January 1918
Redesignated 803d Aero Squadron (Repair) on 1 February 1918
Demobilized on 23 June 1919
Reconstituted and consolidated with the 109th Observation Squadron on 20 October 1936

109th Military Airlift Squadron

- Constituted as the 109th Squadron (Observation) and allotted to the Minnesota NG

Federally recognized on 17 January 1921
Redesignated 109th Observation Squadron on 25 January 1923
Consolidated with the 803d Aero Squadron on 20 October 1936
Ordered to active service on 10 February 1941
Redesignated 109th Observation Squadron (Medium) on 13 January 1942
Redesignated 19th Observation Squadron on 4 July 1942
Redesignated 109th Reconnaissance Squadron (Fighter) on 31 May 1943;
Redesignated 109th Tactical Reconnaissance Squadron on 13 November 1943
Inactivated on 9 November 1945
Redesignated 109th Fighter Squadron, Single Engine and allotted to the National Guard on 24 May 1946
Organized on 26 July 1946
Extended federal recognition and activated on 14 September 1946
Federalized and placed on active duty on 2 March 1951
Redesignated 109th Fighter-Interceptor Squadron on 23 March 1951
Inactivated, released from active duty and returned to Minnesota state control on 1 December 1952
Activated on 1 December 1952
Redesignated 109th Air Transport Squadron, Heavy on 15 January 1960 (Note: On 20 June 1962, the Dapartment of the Air Force directed the squadron be redesignated the 109th Combat Airlift Squadron, effective 1 July 1962. This action was revoked on 26 June 1962.)
Federalized and placed on active duty on 1 October 1961
Released from active duty and returned to Minnesota state control on 31 August 1962
Redesignated 109th Military Airlift Squadron on 1 January 1966
Inactivated on 19 March 1972
Consolidated with the 109th Tactical Airlift Squadron on 18 August 1987

109th Airlift Squadron

- Constituted as the 109th Tactical Airlift Squadron

Activated on 20 March 1971
Consolidated with the 109th Military Airlift Squadron on 18 August 1987
Redesignated 109th Airlift Squadron on 16 March 1992

Belgian Fourragère

== Assignments ==
- Post Headquarters, Kelly Field, 27 August–1 November 1917
- Aviation Concentration Center, 1 November–7 December 1917
- Replacement Concentration Center, AEF, 2–18 January 1918
- Air Service Production Center No. 2, 18 January 1918~June 1919
- Post Headquarters, Mitchel Field, 13–23 June 1919
- Minnesota NG (divisional aviation, 34th Division), 17 January 1921
- V Army Corps, 10 February 1941;
- 67th Observation (later Reconnaissance; Tactical Reconnaissance; Reconnaissance) Group, 1 September 1941 – 9 November 1945
- 71st Fighter Wing, 14 September 1946
- 133d Fighter Group (later 133d Fighter-Interceptor Group), 28 August 1947
- 31st Air Division, 6 February 1952 – 1 December 1952
- 133d Fighter-Interceptor Group (latter 133d Fighter Group, 133d Air Transport Group, 133d Military Airlift Group), 1 December 1952 – 19 March 1971
- 133d Tactical Airlift Group, 20 March 1971
- 133d Tactical Airlift Wing, 1 December 1974
- 133d Operations Group, 1 January 1993 – present

== Stations ==
- Kelly Field, Texas, 27 August 1917
- Aviation Concentration Center, Garden City, New York, 1 November–7 December 1917
- St. Maixent Replacement Barracks, France, 2 January 1918
- Romorantin Aerodrome, France, 18 January 1918~June 1919
- Mitchel Field, NY, c. 13–23 June 1919
- Curtiss Field, Minnesota (1921–1922)
- Speedway Field (later Wold-Chamberlain Field), Minnesota (1922–1930)
- Holman Field, Minnesota (1930–1941)
- Camp Beauregard Army Field, La, 27 February 1941
- Savannah Army Air Base, Georgia, 18 December 1941
- Esler Field, La, 29 January–12 August 1942
- RAF Membury (AAF-466), England, 7 September 1942
- RAF Atcham (AAF-342), England, 21 November 1942
- RAF Membury (AAF-466), England, 15 May 1943
- RAF Middle Wallop (AAF-449), England, 12 December 1943
- Le Molay Airfield (A-9), France, 4 July 1944
- Toussus-le-Noble Airport (A-46), France, 29 August 1944
- Buc Airfield, France, c. 31 August 1944
- Gosselies, Belgium, 20 September 1944

Operated from Chievres Airfield (A-84), Belgium, 7–18 December 1944

- Vogelsang, Germany, 24 March 1945
- Limburg, Germany, 2 April 1945
- Eschwege, Germany, 12 April–c. 6 July 1945
- Drew Field, Fla, 16 September–9 November 1945
- Holman Field, Minnesota, 14 September 1946
- Fort Snelling, 1 May 1951
- Minneapolis-St. Paul Metropolitan Airport, Minnesota, 1 June 1951 – 1 December 1952
- Holman Field, Minnesota, 1 December 1952
- Minneapolis-St. Paul International Airport, Minnesota, 1 June 1951 – 1 December 1952 – 19 March 1971
- Minneapolis-St. Paul International Airport (later Minneapolis–Saint Paul Joint Air Reserve Station), Minnesota, 20 March 1971 – present

== Aircraft ==
- Single leased Curtiss Oriole, 1921
- JN-4H Jenny, 1922–1927
- JNS-1 (JN-6) Jenny, 1922–1927
- Douglas O-38B, 1930–1938
- Douglas O-38E, 1935–1938
- BC-1, 1938–1941
- North American O-47, 1938–1942
- F-51D Mustang, 1947–1954
- F-94A/B Starfire, 1954–1957
- F-94C Starfire, 1957–1960
- F-89H Scorpion, 1958–1960
- C-97G Stratofreighter, 1960–1971
- C-130A Hercules, 1971–1981
- C-130E Hercules, 1981–1995
- C-130H Hercules, 1995–2026
- C-130J-30 Hercules, 2026-present

== See also ==
- List of American aero squadrons
- List of observation squadrons of the United States Army National Guard
