= Raymond S. Miller =

US army air force general

Brigadier General Ray Simeon Miller
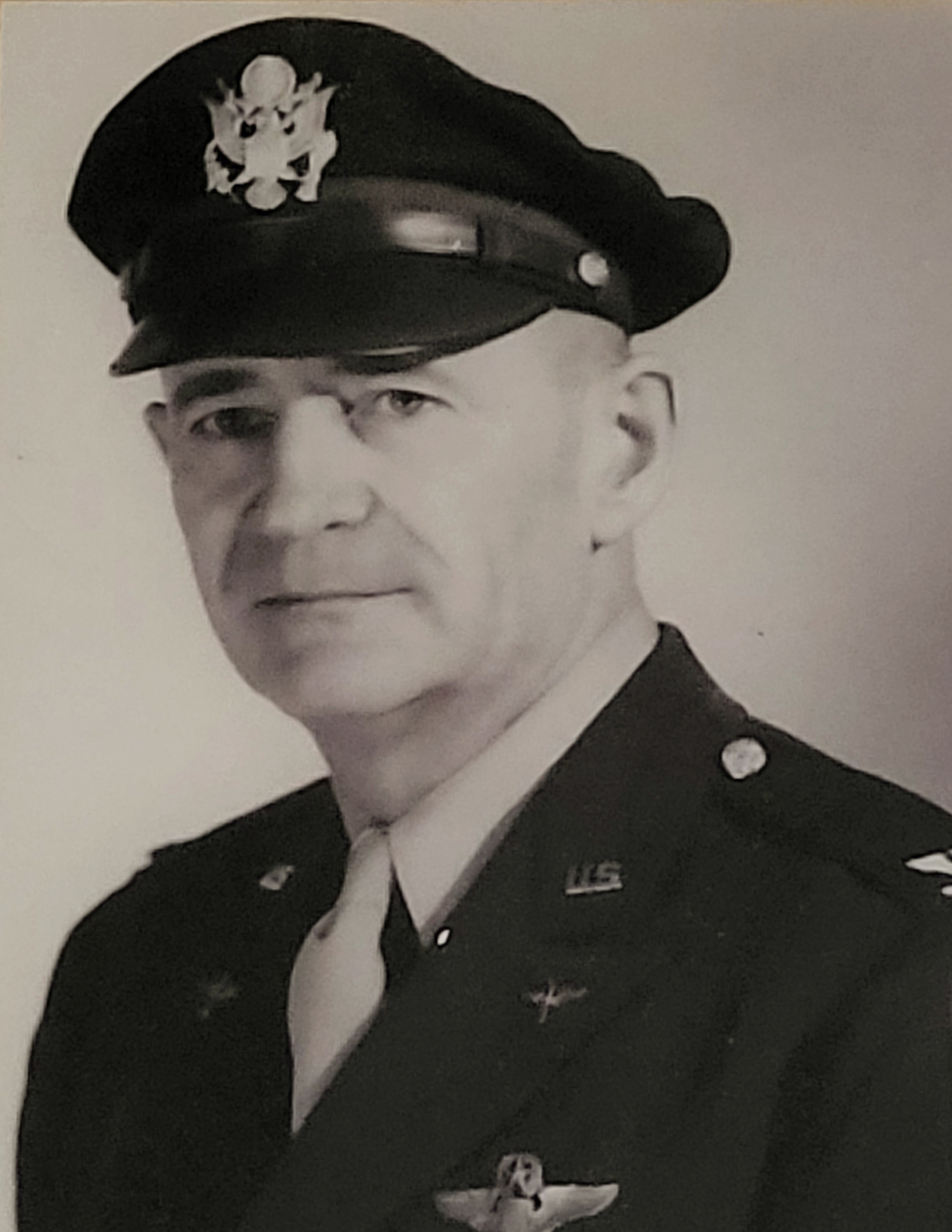
- Brig Gen Ray S Miller
- Born: December 14, 1891; Van Wert, Ohio, US
- Died: September 27, 1961 (aged 64); St. Paul, Minnesota, US
- Burial place: Acacia Park Cemetery, Mendota Heights
- Other name: Ray Miller
- Spouse: Eva Miller (m. 1943)
- Military career
- Allegiance: United States
- Branch: (1917–1919) US Army Signal Corps; (1919–1920) US Army Reserves; (1920–1941) Minnesota Air National Guard; (1941–1946) US Army Air Forces; (1946–1948) US Air Force Reserves; (1948–1951) Minnesota Air National Guard; (1951–1951) US Air Force
- Service years: 1917–1951
- Rank: Brigadier General
- Service number: 163634
- Units: 109th Observation Squadron; Minnesota Air National Guard
- Commands: Minnesota Air National Guard; 109th Observation Squadron; 420th Air Base Squadron; 4104th Army Air Force Base; 133rd Tactical Fighter Wing
- Known for: Formation of the Minnesota Air National Guard
- Awards: Honors and awards

Raymond Simeon Miller (December 14, 1891 – September 27, 1961) was a United States military brigadier general and military aviation pioneer. Known as the "Father of the Air National Guard" for his historical flight in 1920 that resulted in the formation of the first federally recognized National Guard aviation unit after the Militia Bureau had authorized states to organize such units earlier that year.

== Early life and education ==
Ray Miller was born on December 14, 1891, to John and Anna Miller, on a farm in Pleasant Township, just 3.5 miles west of Van Wert, Ohio on Lincoln Highway (Highway 12). While growing up, Ray Miller attended a one-room brick schoolhouse about .75 miles south of his family farm. He did not attend high school, which was attributed in a biography to his bashful personality. Although, while bashful, he did excel in sports like baseball and sport shooting. As a teenager, he bought an Indian Motorcycle and was known for winning races around the state and nearby Indiana. The local newspaper once referred to him as a motorcycle riding daredevil. Additionally, locals knew him from his time as a clerk in Scholler's Jewelry Store.

Even though he had not attended high school, in 1917 he left to attend college in Fremont Nebraska at Luther College, today's Midland University.

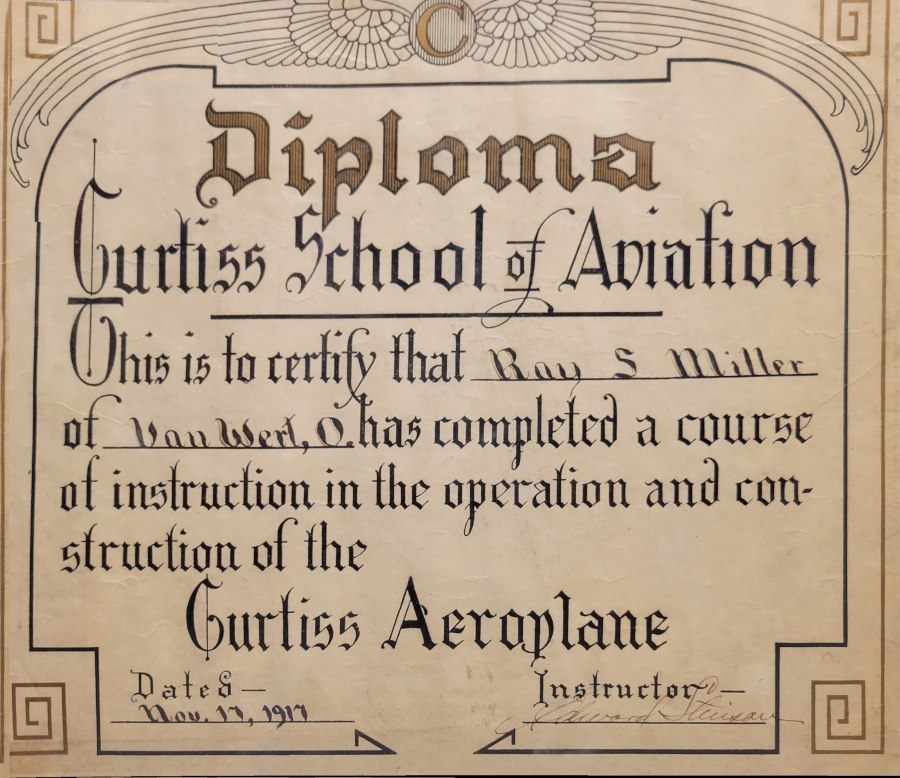
Miller's 1917 diploma

On December 17, 1917, the US declared war on Germany. The US's entrance into the war spurred many young men to enlist in the Armed Forces to serve, and Miller was no exception.

After one year in university, Miller enrolled in pilot training at the Stearman Flying School in San Antonio where he obtained his pilot's license. Following that he joined the Army's Signal Corp and was sent to the Aviation Cader Training Program in his home state of Ohio. Following his graduation as an aviation cadet, he served with the Aviation Section, U.S. Signal Corps.

== Military career ==
Miller was initially commissioned a second lieutenant in the Air Corps, Army Reserves, on March 10, 1919. First assigned to train at the Ohio State University Aviation Cadet Training Program near Columbus, Ohio, and then Wright Field in Dayton, Ohio. Once his advanced aviation training was completed, World War I was nearing its end and Miller was never sent to Europe to fight.

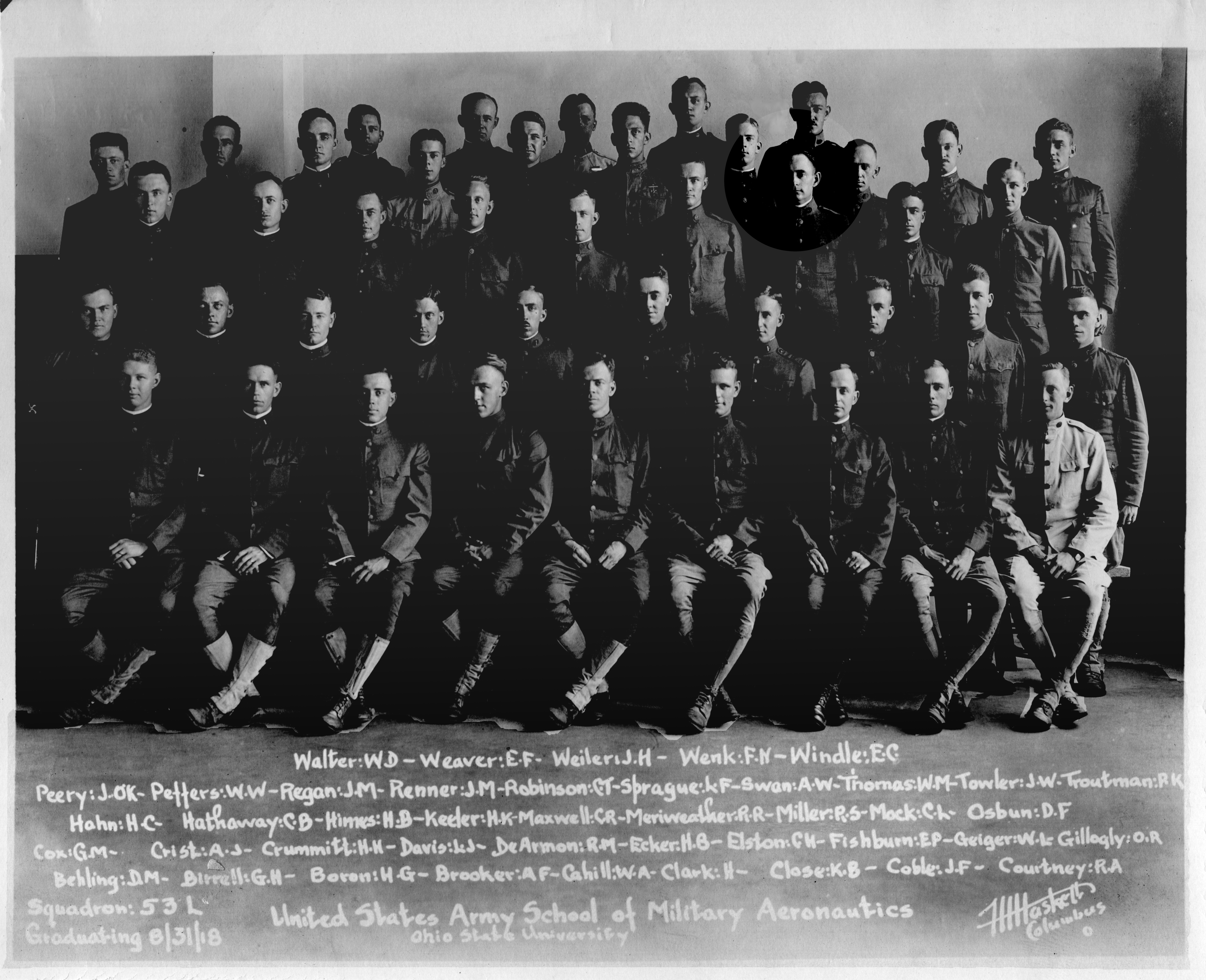
Millers graduation class from the United States Army School of Military Aeronautics at Ohio State University. Squadron 53L Dated 8/21/1918

Ray Miller accepted a military discharge. He then became a part of the Army Reserves and pursued a civilian career in aviation, finding employment with Curtiss Northwest Airport in St. Paul, Minnesota, as the chief pilot for the Curtiss Field's new flying school.

Prior to this, the Minnesota State Adjutant General, Walter Rhinow, had created a state-sponsored Minnesota Air National Guard and was attempting to make Minnesota the first state with a federally recognized aviation military unit. Unfortunately, the US Army had prohibited aviation squadrons being commissioned until the National Defense Act of 1920.

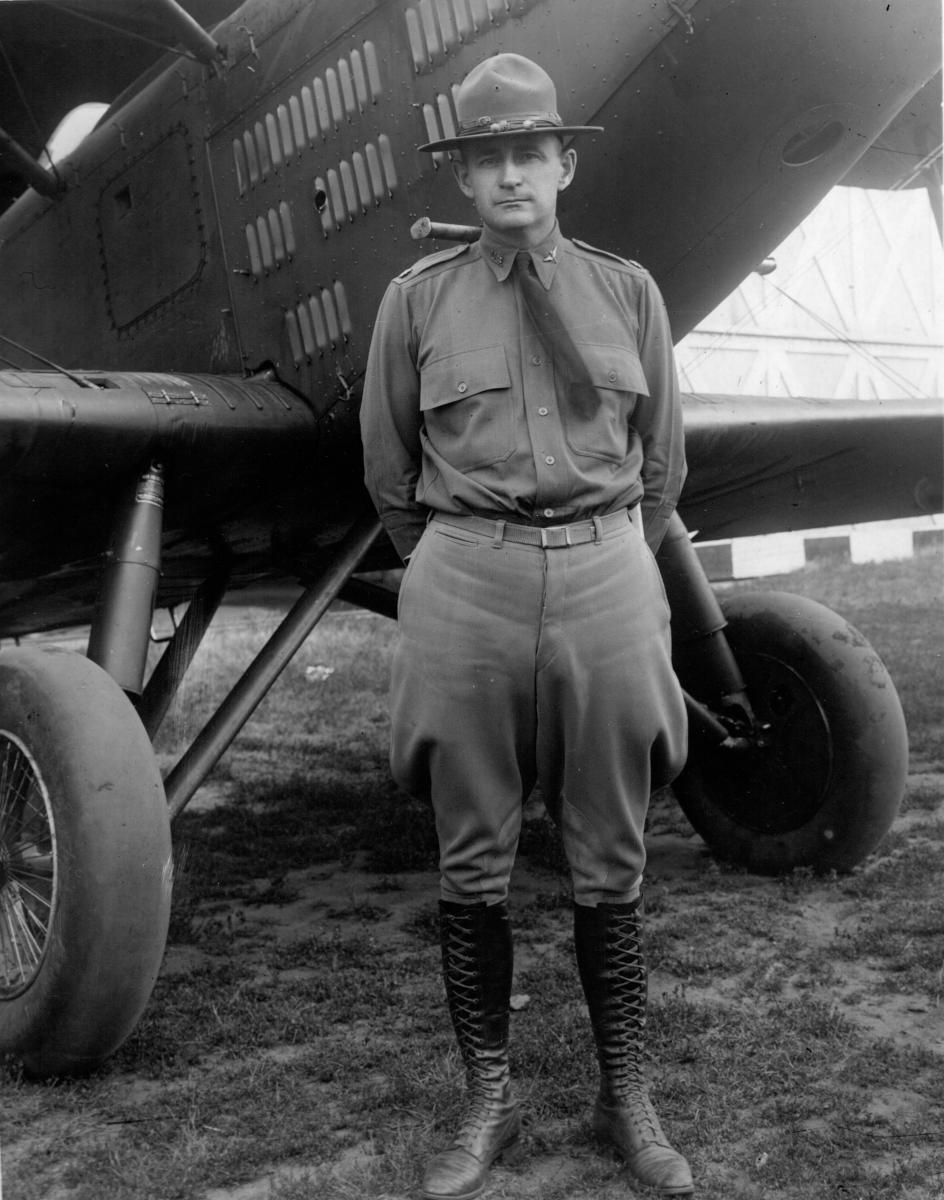
Ray Miller in 1928

On July 12, 1920, shortly after the Milita Bureau had authorized the organization of aero squadrons in state National Guard units, General Rhinow organized the 109th Observation Squadron.

=== Historic flight to Washington D.C. ===
When the group's telegrams to the Milita Bureau in Washington D.C. were not responded to, they planned at trip to D.C.

On September 26, 1920, then Captain Miller, along with Major William Garis and General Rhinow, embarked on a 1,600 mile journey to Washington D.C. that took seven days. Their journey included overnight stays in Madison, Wisconsin; Van Wert, Ohio; Buffalo, New York' Poughkeepsie, New York; and Garden City, New York. Their stop in Van Wert was at Miller's childhood home. He landed their aircraft in a field across the road from the Miller family farm, located about four miles west of Van Wert proper. When the group stopped in Poughkeepsie, New York they were delayed there an additional night due to weather. Century In the Sky 1921 - 2021. Itasca Books. 2023.

It was not until January 17, 1921, the 109th Observation Squadron became the first federally recognized Air National Guard squadron. Miller was assigned as Squadron Commander of the 109th Observation Squadron and promoted to the rank of major.

=== World War II ===
On February 10, 1941, Miller relinquished command of the 109th Observation Squadron for assignments due to the rapid organization and expansion of the Air Forces with the onset of World War II. While Miller was on active-duty status in the Air Force, he was first assigned as the Squadron and Group Commanding Officer at Easler Field, Alabama, from February 26 to April 16, 1941. Again serving as the Squadron and Group Commanding Officer, Miller was assigned to a training field in Louisiana until October 27, 1941. Miller then went to Wright Field near Dayton, Ohio, where he eventually became an inspector general and was there through January 31, 1942. Still an inspector general, Miller was reassigned to Rome, New York, at the newly activated Rome Air Depot, which would eventually be named Griffiss Air Force Base.

On August 3, 1943, he would be elevated to Commanding Officer of the 420th Base Headquarters and 420th Air Base Squadron. A month later Miller would become the Base Commander, again at the Rome Air Depot. He remained the Base Commander of the 4104th Army Air Force Base until he left for the European Theater in late December of that year.

In Europe, Miller was assigned to the 7th Air Force Tactical Air Command as an air inspector until the end of the war. Ray Miller served active Federal Service from February 1941 until he was released in June 1946. He was a colonel at the time he left active service.

=== Post-World War II ===
Post-war, Miller was relieved from active Federal Service on June 18, 1946, and rapidly reorganized the Minnesota Air National Guard. As a member of the 133rd Tactical Fighter Wing, Miller flew a North American P-51 Mustang. In March 1950, Miller was promoted to brigadier general and on March 1, 1951, he was again called to active military service for the Korean War. Through the war, General Miller served in the Air Defense Command in Colorado.

Following the Korean War, Miller was relieved from active military service on May 31, 1952, and retired after 33 years of service to his nation. He continued to actively serve as an advisor for the Minnesota Air National Guard.

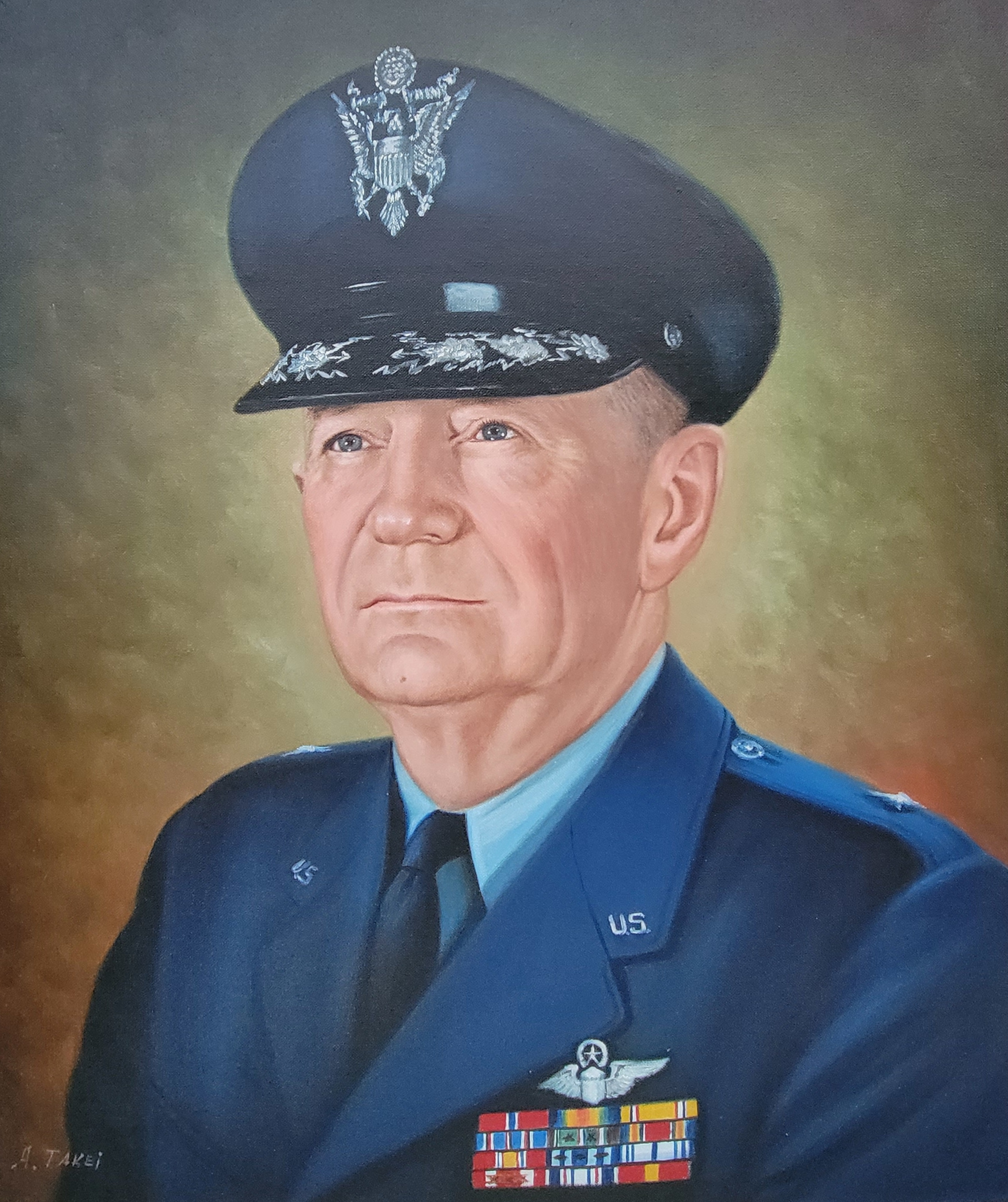
Portrait of Raymond S Miller

== Personal life ==
When Miller first arrived in Minnesota following World War I, he took a job at the flight training school at Curtiss Northwest Airport in St. Paul, where he was the business operator and chief flight instructor. Eventually he went into the real estate, investment, and insurance business when not serving in active federal service. Miller served as head of the Minnesota Aeronautics Commission in the 1930s and was active in licensing Minnesota's aircraft and pilots.

In 1922, Eva Hope took her first airplane ride and (then) Major Miller was at the controls of the aircraft. Ray Miller and Eva Hope married on March 12, 1943.

Miller was active in photography civil aviation, pistol, rifle, and trap shooting. He was also active in many organizations, such as The Elks, Jesters, Kiwanis, and the American Legion. Miller was raised as a member of the Freemasons, including both the York and Scottish Rites, 32 degree and the Shrine.

He died on May 31, 1961. The Governor of Minnesota ordered that flags be flown at half-staff until sunset three days later.

== Dates of military rank ==
Insignia	Rank	Service and components	Date
No insignia	Aviation cadet	US Signal Corps	March 10, 1919
	Second lieutenant	US Signal Corps US Army Reserves	March 10, 1919
	First lieutenant	US Army Air Service	March 17, 1921; Resigned February 15, 1930
	Major	Minnesota Air National Guard	February 1, 1921
	Lieutenant colonel	US Army Air Corps	June 18, 1946
	Colonel	US Army Air Corps	February 16, 1942
	Brigadier general	Minnesota Air National Guard	March 31, 1950

== Honors and awards ==

US Air Force Command Pilot Badge
Bronze Star	World War I Victory Medal	American Defense Service Medal
American Campaign Medal	European African Middle Eastern Campaign Medal	World War II Victory Medal
National Defense Service Medal	Armed Forces Reserves Medal	Minnesota Distinguished Service Medal
Minnesota Long Service Medal		

In addition to these medals, Miller was awarded the Minnesota Medal of Merit. This was a ribbon worn around the neck and was awarded only 57 times between the years 1927 and 1954, when it was in existence. The ribbon was red with a wide yellow stripe down the middle with the medal hanging on it.

=== Minnesota Aviation Hall of Fame ===
Miller was inducted into the Minnesota Aviation Hall of Fame in 1988.

=== Namesakes ===
Many facilities and streets are named for Miller, such as Miller Drive at Fort Snelling in St Paul, Minnesota.

The airfield at Camp Ripley in Little Falls, Minnesota, is named the Ray S. Miller Army Airfield.

== See also ==
- Minnesota Air National Guard Museum
- Camp Ripley
