= Curtiss Airport =

Curtiss Airport may refer to:

- LaGuardia Airport, known as Glenn H. Curtiss Airport from 1930 to 1939
- Roosevelt Field (airport), a former airport in Garden City, New York, that was once named Curtiss Field
- Columbia Field, a former airport in Valley Stream, New York, that was named Curtiss Airfield in the 1930s
- St. Louis Downtown Airport, which was formerly known as Curtiss-Steinberg Airport between 1929 and 1940
- Lawrence J. Timmerman Airport of Milwaukee, Wisconsin, formerly named Curtiss-Wright Field from 1929-1959
- Curtiss Northwest Airport (Minnesota), a former airport that existed between 1919 and 1930
- Curtis Field, the city-owned airport of Brady, Texas
