= 148th Fighter Wing =

United States Air Force flying unit

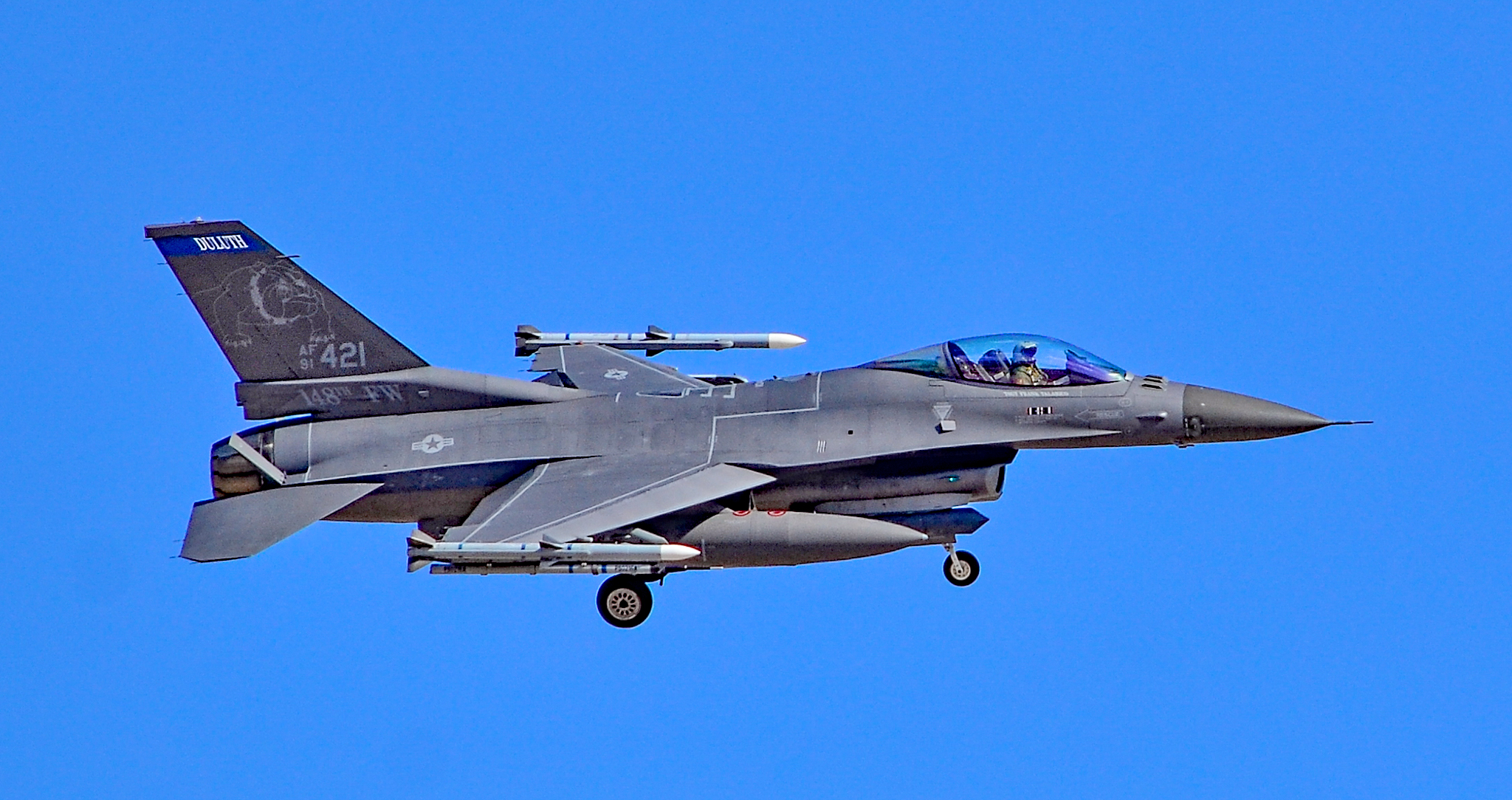
- 148th Fighter Wing F-16CM Block 50 Fighting Falcon
- Country: United States
- Allegiance: Minnesota
- Branch: Air National Guard
- Type: Wing
- Role: Fighter
- Part of: Minnesota Air National Guard
- Garrison/HQ: Duluth Air National Guard Base, Minnesota
- Nickname: Bulldogs
- Tail Code: Duluth

Commanders
- Current commander: Colonel Curtis Grayson

Insignia
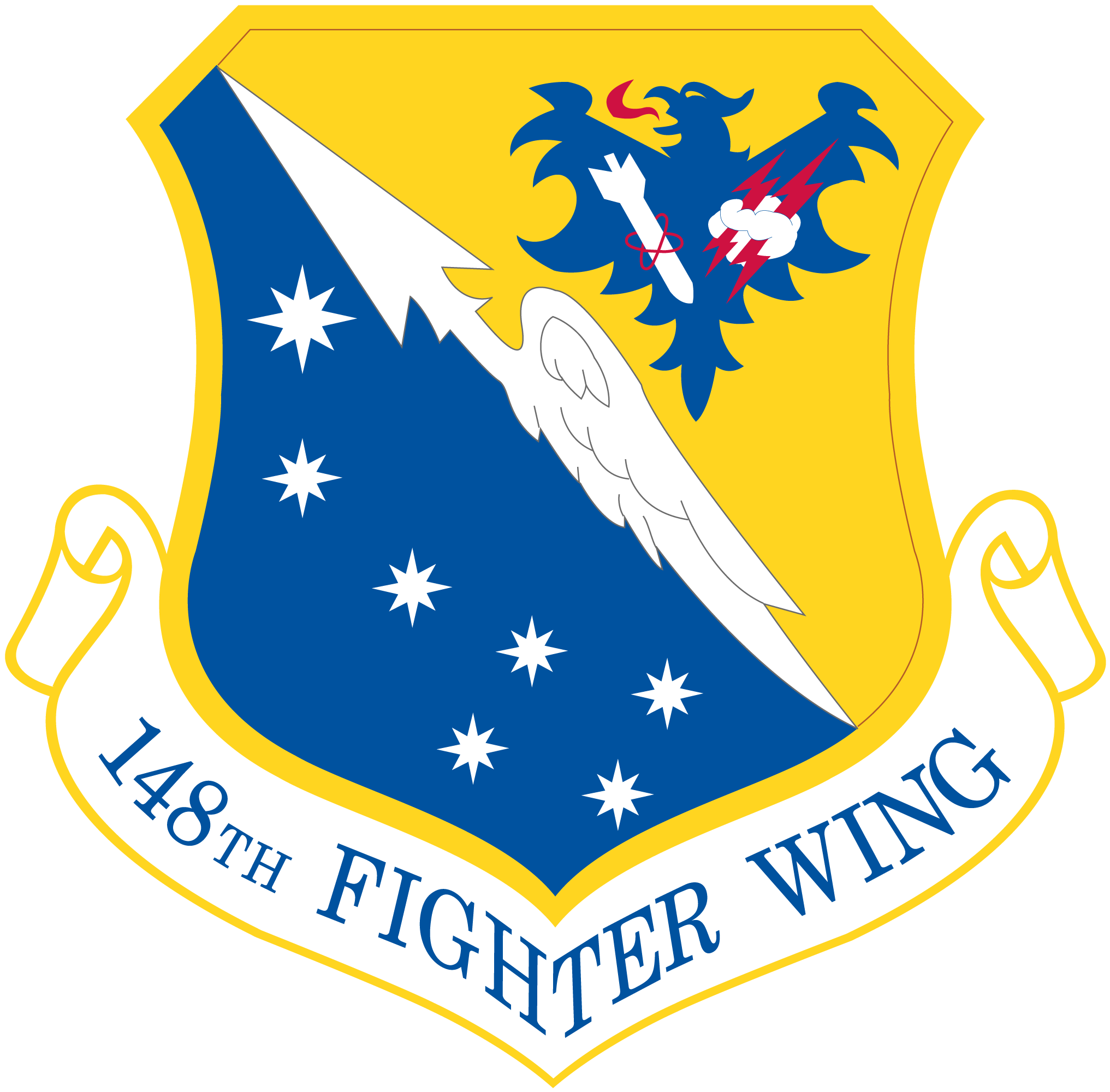
- 148th Fighter Wing emblem: Official emblem of the 148th Fighter Wing, Minnesota, Air National Guard

Aircraft flown
- Fighter: F-16C/D Block 50 Fighting Falcon

The 148th Fighter Wing is a unit of the Minnesota Air National Guard located at Duluth Air National Guard Base, Minnesota. The 148th is unit equipped with the General Dynamics F-16C Fighting Falcon. If activated to federal service, the Wing is gained by the United States Air Force Air Combat Command. The wing specializes in the Suppression and Destruction of Enemy Air Defenses (SEAD).

== Overview ==
The federal mission of the 148 FW in accordance with Title 10 USC is to maintain wartime readiness and the ability to mobilize and deploy expeditiously to carry out tactical air missions or combat support activities in the event of a war or military emergency. More specifically, the wing specializes in the Suppression and Destruction of Enemy Air Defenses (SEAD). The MNANG operates as part of the Total Force of the U.S. military and is fully integrated with the active duty U.S. Air Force to perform its military mission.

The wing flies the F-16 Fighting Falcon, a single-seat, multipurpose fighter with the ability to fly at up to twice the speed of sound. It is capable of performing air-to-air and air-to-ground tactical missions. The 148th flew the F-16A from 10 March 1990, to the end of 2003. On 27 April 2010 the wing transitioned to the single seat F-16C Block 50 (and a small number of twin seat F-16D Block 50).

The MNANG's state mission under Title 32 USC is to respond to the call of the Governor of Minnesota in the event of natural disasters or domestic disturbances within the state of Minnesota.

== History ==
Today's 148th Fighter Wing can trace its roots to the 393rd Fighter Squadron, initially flying P-38Js during World War II. The 393rd flew its last mission of the war in 1945 and was inactivated.

The unit was reactivated on 17 September 1948 as the 179th Fighter Squadron in the Minnesota Air National Guard at Duluth, Minn. and has grown from the original 50 members into the 148th Fighter Wing that we know today. The unit has changed aircraft several times over the years from the F-51D Mustang (flown until 1954) to the most current Block 50 F-16CM Fighting Falcon.

The 148th Fighter Group was formed on July 1, 1960, when it was integrated with the 179th Fighter Squadron that was previously under the command of the 133rd Fighter Wing. The same time the 148th gained alert status for the Air Defense Command mission of Duluth.

From 1967 to 1983, the 148th Fighter Group transitioned from the F-102A Delta Dagger replacing the F-89J. The F-102A was upgraded to the F-101B in 1971, and the fighter remained in use until 1976.

In 1976 the 148th Fighter Group was redesignated to the 148th Tactical Reconnaissance Group after gaining F-4C Phantom II Mach-2 reconnaissance aircraft. The wing lost their old mission of air defense and changed to all weather and conditions reconnaissance. In October 1983, the 148th found itself transitioned back to the air defense role, and was renamed the 148th Fighter Interceptor Group. During this period the 148th received new aircraft from the Vietnam War, the F-4D Phantom II, tactical fighter.

On March 10, 1990, saw the wing receive their first F-16A fighters. In 1995, the 148th Fighter Group received its wing status with the addition of a detachment on alert status at Tyndall AFB. At the end of 2003, the 148th Fighter Wing converted to the newer Block 25 F-16C/D and end the alert detachment at Tyndall AFB.

== Post Cold War ==
Pilots from the 148th Fighter Wing flew combat air patrol missions over Washington DC and New York after the terrorist attacks on September 11, 2001.

In April 2010, the 148th Fighter Wing received their first Block 50 F-16's from the 22nd Fighter Squadron at Spangdahlem Air Base when the squadron disbanded. The wing became the first ANG wing to convert to Block 50 F-16 Falcons.

During August 2012 the 148th Fighter Wing deployed to Kandahar Airfield, Afghanistan for a two-month deployment in support of Operation Enduring Freedom. August 2015, the 148th deployed eight F-16s and over 120 personnel to Eielson Air Force Base, Alaska for RED FLAG-Alaska 15–3.

During May/June 2014 the wing sent F-16s to Graf Ignatievo Air Base, Bulgaria for the joint U.S.-Bulgarian Exercise Thracian Star. April 2016 saw the wing deploy 12 aircraft and about 300 airmen to Osan Air Base for nearly four months as part of a theater security package.

During February 2018, the wing's F-16s were responsible for providing combat air patrols over Minneapolis during Super Bowl LII. On April 13, 2018, the 148th deployed F-16s and personnel to an undisclosed location in Southwest Asia for an Operation Inherent Resolve deployment. The squadron's F-16s flew more than 600 combat sorties and nearly 3,500 hours. Aircraft and personnel returned to Duluth Air National Guard Base on July 21, 2018.

In April 2019 the 148th Fighter Wing deployed nearly 180 Air National Guard Airmen and several aircraft to Leeuwarden Air Base, Netherlands for Exercise Frisian Flag 2019.

In September 2019, the wing won the National Guard Association "Spaatz trophy" and the Air Force Association's Outstanding Air National Guard Flying Unit award for the most outstanding airmanship.

At 2:42pm on February 12, 2023, an F-16C operated by the 148th Fighter Wing downed an unidentified object floating above Lake Huron with an AIM9x Sidewinder missile. The aircraft was temporarily based out of Truax Field, near Madison, Wisconsin.

== Organization ==
- 148th Fighter Wing, at Duluth Air National Guard Base
  - 148th Fighter Wing Headquarters
    - Command Post
    - Chaplain Section
    - Comptroller Flight
    - Information Protection
    - Inspector General
    - Judge Advocate General
    - Military Equal Opportunity
    - Public Affairs
    - Wing Safety
  - 148th Mission Support Group
    - 148th Civil Engineering Squadron
    - 148th Communications Flight
    - 148th Force Support Squadron
    - 148th Logistics Readiness Squadron
    - 148th Security Forces Squadron
  - 148th Operations Group
    - 179th Fighter Squadron, with F-16CM Block 50 Fighting Falcon
    - 148th Operations Support Squadron
  - 148th Maintenance Group
    - 148th Aircraft Maintenance Squadron
    - 148th Maintenance Squadron
    - 148th Maintenance Operations Flight
  - 148th Medical Group
    - 148th Bio Environmental
    - 148th Medical Administration
    - 148th Nursing Services
    - 148th Public Health

== Lineage ==
- Recognized as 179th Fighter Squadron 17 September 1948

Constituted as the 148th Fighter Group (Air Defense) on 24 June 1960 Activated on 1 July 1960
Redesignated 148th Fighter-Interceptor Group c. 1 January 1972
Redesignated 148th Tactical Reconnaissance Group on 10 January 1976
Redesignated 148th Fighter-Interceptor Group on 15 November 1983
Redesignated 148th Fighter Group on 16 March 1992
Redesignated 148th Fighter Wing on 16 October 1995

== Leaders ==
Commanders
- Col. Curtis Grayson, 2026 – present
- Col. Nathan P. Aysta, 2022 – 2026
- Col. Chris Blomquist, 2017 – 2022
- Col. Jon S. Safstrom, 2015 – 2017
- Col. Frank H. Stokes, 2009 – 2015
- Col. Mark R. Johnson, 2004 – 2009
- Col. Timothy J. Cossalter, 1998 – 2004
- Col. Kenneth J. Stromquist, Jr., 1997 – 1998
- Col. Thomas G. Palkie, 1995 – 1997
- Col. Raymond T. Klosowski, 1989 – 1995
- Col. John D. Broman, 1985 – 1989
- Col. John H Spencer, Sr., 1981 – 1985
- Col. William H. Carr, 1978 – 1981
- Col. Wayne C. Gatlin, Sr., 1966 – 1978
- Col. John R. Hed, 1958 – 1966
- Col. Ralph M. Jerome, 1949 – 1958
- Capt. Earl W. Johnson, 1948 – 1949

.

Command Chief Master Sergeants
- CCMSgt. Sally Ford, August 2024 - Present
- CCMSgt. Jozef Miketin, 2021 – 2025
- CCMSgt. Lisa Erikson, 2017 – 2020
- CCMSgt Mark S. Rukavina, 2011 – 2016
- CCMSgt Michael D. Layman, 2010 – 2011
- CCMSgt Jodi L. Stauber, 2007 – 2010
- CCMSgt John J. Bucsko, 2005 – 2007
- CCMSgt Brian J. Briggs, 2004 – 2005
- CCMSgt Dennis R. Jindra, 2000 – 2004
- CMSgt Roger G. Brummer 1992 – 2000, Senior Enlisted Advisor
- CMSgt John W. Huntsberger, Senior Enlisted Advisor

== Assignments ==
- 133d Air Defense Wing, 1 July 1960
- 128th Air Defense Wing, 1 April 1961
- 132d Air Defense Wing, 1 January 1969
- Minnesota Air National Guard, 1 August 1969 – present

== Stations ==
- Duluth Municipal Airport (later Duluth International Airport, Duluth Air National Guard Base), Minnesota, 1 July 1960 – present

== Aircraft ==
- North American F-51 Mustang, 1948–1954
- Lockheed F-94A/B Starfire, 1954–1957
- Lockheed F-94C Starfire, 1957–1959
- Northrop F-89J Scorpion, 1959–1966
- Convair F-102A Delta Dagger, 1966–1971
- McDonnell F-101B Voodoo, 1971–1976
- McDonnell RF-4C Phantom II, 1976–1983
- McDonnell F-4D Phantom II, 1983–1990
- General Dynamics F-16A/B Fighting Falcon, 1990–2003
- General Dynamics F-16C/D Fighting Falcon, Block 25, 2003 – 2010
- General Dynamics F-16CJ Fighting Falcon, Block 50, 2012 – present

== Awards ==
- Air Force Outstanding Unit Award: 1979, 1988, 1999, 2001, 2007, 2008 & 2009
- Winston P. Wilson Award (Outstanding Air National Guard All Weather Interceptor Unit): 1957
- Ricks Trophy for excellence: 1967
- First place in the William Tell Weapons Competition: 1970
- Raytheon Trophy (formerly the Hughes Trophy) Best Fighter Unit in the United States Air Force: Four times, most recently 2009
- Air Force Association's Outstanding Air National Guard Flying Unit Award: 2019
- Spaatz Trophy (Outstanding flying unit in the Air National Guard): 2019 (previously won in 2006, 2009, and 2012)
- Air Force Association's Outstanding Air National Guard Flying Unit Award: 2019 (previously won in 2006, 2009 and 2012).
