= Minnesota Air National Guard =

- Founded: 17 January 1921
- Country: United States
- Allegiance: State of Minnesota
- Branch: Air National Guard
- Type: State militia, military reserve force
- Role: "To meet state and federal mission responsibilities."
- Part of: Minnesota National Guard; United States National Guard Bureau
- Garrison/HQ: Minnesota Air National Guard, 631 Minuteman Dr, St Paul, Minnesota, 55111.

Commanders
- Civilian leadership: President Donald Trump (Commander-in-Chief); Frank Kendall III (Secretary of the Air Force); Governor Tim Walz (Governor of the State of Minnesota)
- State military leadership: Major General (MN) Shawn P. Manke (Adjutant General of Minnesota)

Aircraft flown
- Fighter: F-16CJ Fighting Falcon
- Transport: C-130H Hercules

The Minnesota Air National Guard (MN ANG) is the aerial militia of the U.S. state of Minnesota. It is a reserve of the United States Air Force and along with the Minnesota Army National Guard, an element of the Minnesota National Guard of the larger United States National Guard Bureau.

As state militia units, the units in the Minnesota Air National Guard are not in the normal United States Air Force chain of command. They are under the jurisdiction of the governor of Minnesota though the office of the Adjutant General of Minnesota unless they are federalized by order of the president of the United States. The Minnesota National Guard is headquartered in St. Paul, and its commander is currently Major General Shawn P. Manke.

== Overview ==
Under the "Total Force" concept, Minnesota Air National Guard units are considered to be Air Reserve Components (ARC) of the United States Air Force (USAF). Minnesota ANG units are trained and equipped by the Air Force and are operationally gained by a major command of the USAF if federalized. In addition, the Minnesota Air National Guard forces are assigned to Air Expeditionary Forces and are subject to deployment tasking orders along with their active duty and Air Force Reserve counterparts in their assigned cycle deployment window.

Along with their federal reserve obligations, as state militia units the elements of the Minnesota ANG are subject to being activated by order of the governor to provide protection of life and property, and preserve peace, order and public safety. State missions include disaster relief in times of earthquakes, hurricanes, floods and forest fires, search and rescue, protection of vital public services, and support to civil defense.

== Components ==
The Minnesota Air National Guard consists of the following major units:

- 133rd Airlift Wing

Established 17 January 1921 (as: 109th Observation Squadron); operates: C-130H3 Hercules
Stationed at: Minneapolis–Saint Paul Joint Air Reserve Station
Gained by: Air Mobility Command
The 133rd Airlift Wing is an air transport organization flying C-130H Hercules tactical airlifters. Its normal flying operations include air-drop training and transport missions.

- 148th Fighter Wing

Established 17 September 1948 (as: 179th Fighter Squadron); operates: F-16 Fighting Falcon
Stationed at: Duluth Air National Guard Base
Gained by: Air Combat Command
The 148th Fighter Wing provides air defense of the northern great lakes and over the state of Minnesota.

== History ==
The Militia Act of 1903 established the present National Guard system, units raised by the states but paid for by the Federal Government, liable for immediate state service. If federalized by Presidential order, they fall under the regular military chain of command.

On 1 June 1920, the Militia Bureau issued Circular No.1 on organization of National Guard air units. Following that announcement, the Assistant Adjutant General for Minnesota, Lt Col William Garis, met with T. Glenn Harrison, a reporter, and Raymond S. Miller, a First World War pilot, to discuss plans for a Minnesota National Guard aviation unit. With the backing of the Minnesota Adjutant General, Brig. Gen. Walter Rhinow, Harrison and Miller formed, on paper, the 109th Squadron, a unit without Federal status. In addition to Rhinow, the initiative had high-level backing in the form of Minnesota Governor Joseph Burnquist.

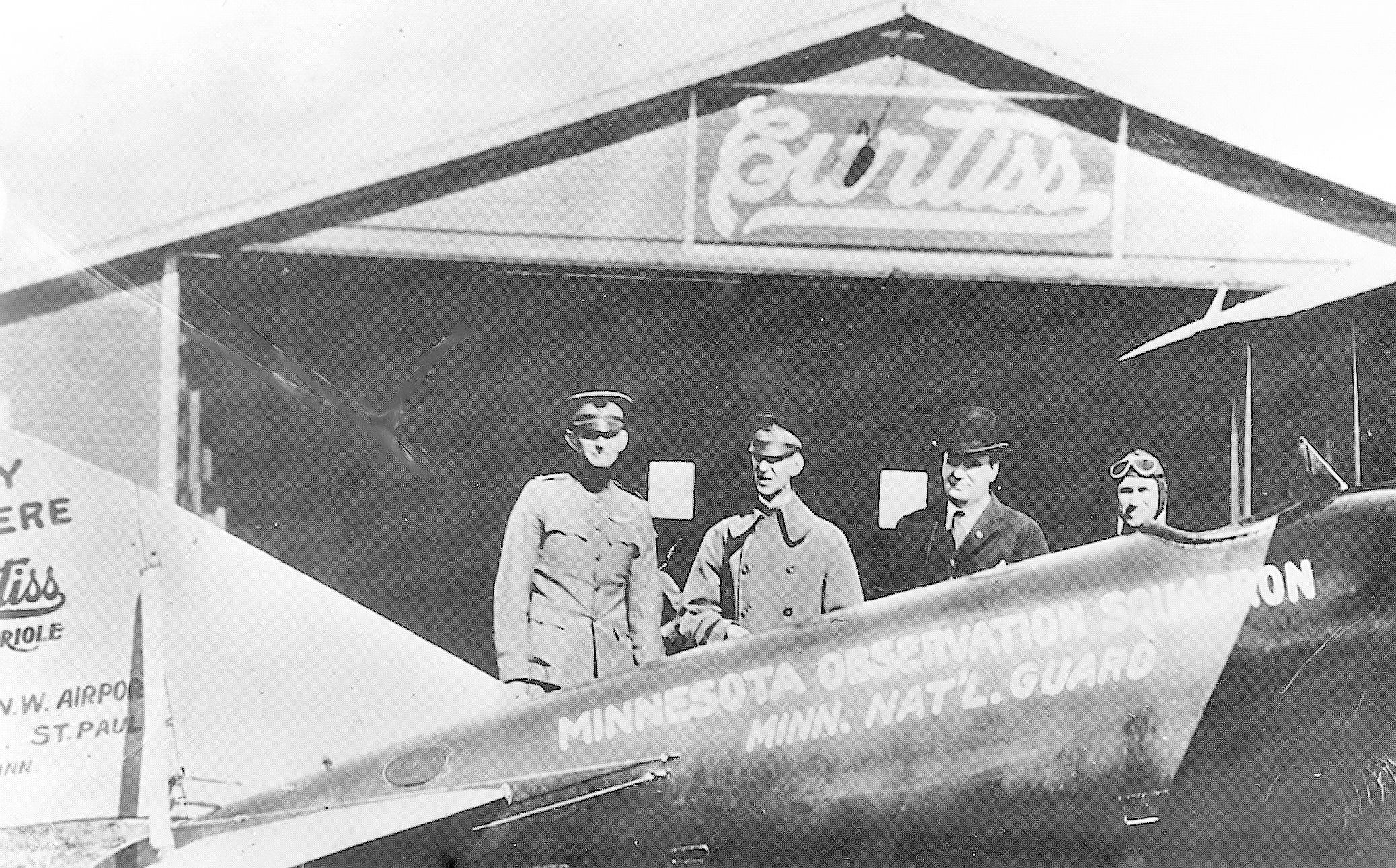
Captain Raymond S. Miller prepares for the historic flight from St. Paul, Minnesota to Washington, D.C., in a rented Curtiss Oriole biplane, with plans for the first air unit of the post-World War I National Guard observation unit, 26 September 1920

On 26 September 1920, encouraged by Governor Burnquist, Brig. Gen. Rhinow, Lt. Col. Garis, and now Captain Ray Miller set out in a rented Curtiss Oriole from St. Paul to Washington DC to lobby the Militia Bureau and the Army Air Service to create an aviation arm for the National Guard. The unprecedented journey took eight days, the trio landing on October 2. In meetings with various military officials, including Brig. Gen Billy Mitchell, then assistant chief of the Air Service, the trio evoked interest and garnered support for Minnesota National Guard aviation. Seemingly as a result, on 17 January 1921 the 109th Squadron was federally recognized, the first National Guard flying unit to achieve such status post-war. The unit was redesignated the 109th Observation Squadron on 25 January 1923.

The 116th Observation Squadron was ordered into active service on 10 February 1941 as part of the buildup of the Army Air Corps prior to the United States entry into World War II. The squadron was sent to Europe, initially flying the Supermarine Spitfire Mk.V, and later reconnaissance missions with the North American F-6 Mustang. During the Korean War Minnesota's Air Guard was also activated, contributing pilots to active wings in Korea.

On 24 May 1946, the United States Army Air Forces, in response to dramatic postwar military budget cuts imposed by President Harry S. Truman, allocated inactive unit designations to the National Guard Bureau for the formation of an Air Force National Guard. These unit designations were allotted and transferred to various State National Guard bureaus to provide them unit designations to re-establish them as Air National Guard units.

The modern Minnesota ANG received federal recognition on 28 August 1947 as the 109th Fighter Squadron at Wold-Chamberlain Field, Minneapolis. It was equipped with F-51D Mustangs and its mission was the air defense of the state. 18 September 1947, however, is considered the Minnesota Air National Guard's official birth concurrent with the establishment of the United States Air Force as a separate branch of the United States military under the National Security Act.

In the 1950s and early 1960 both units of the 179th Fighter Interceptor Squadron in Duluth and 109th Fighter Interceptor Squadron in St. Paul were providing active air defense commitments with 24-hour alert status. Threats by the Soviet Union to oust Western troops from West Berlin in 1961 prompted the Berlin Crisis and a call-up of selected National Guard forces throughout the U.S.

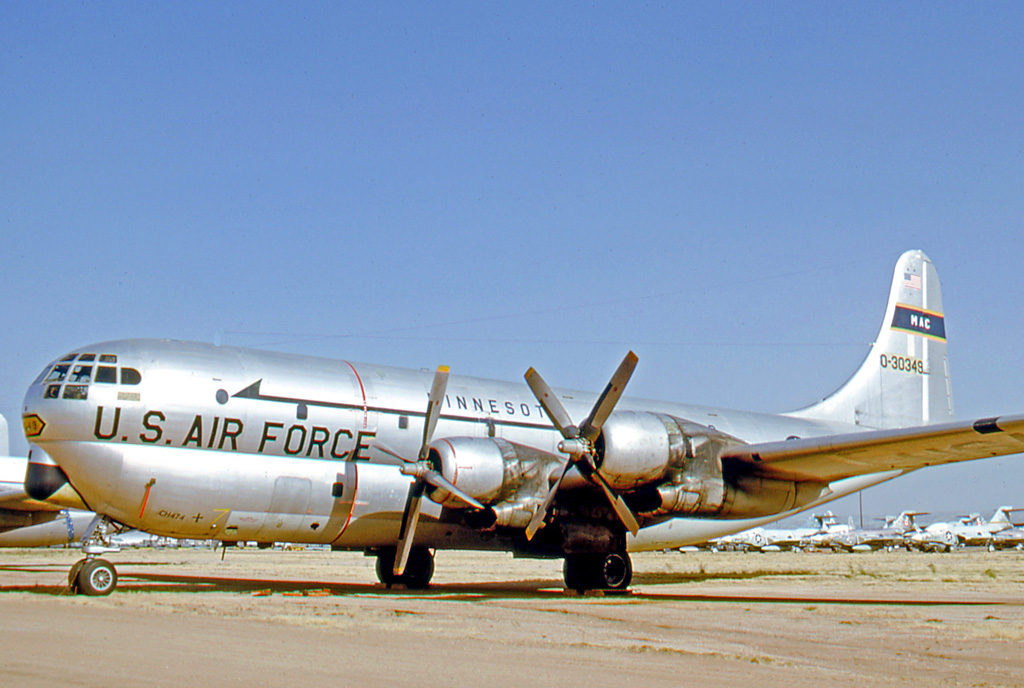
A Boeing C-97G freighter of the Minnesota Air National Guard, 1971

Included in this mobilization were members and Boeing C-97G Stratofreighters of the 133rd Air Transport Wing, who served in federal active service for 11 months while operating out of their home station at the Minneapolis–Saint Paul International Airport.

During the Vietnam War, although never officially mobilized, the Air Guard flew hundreds of supply and transport missions to Southeast Asia.

The Minnesota Air National Guard was also activated after the September 11 terrorist attacks. Immediately after the attack on New York City and Washington, D.C., F-16s from the 148th Fighter Wing flew combat air patrols over key locations. The 133rd Airlift Wing also provided airlift during the War in Afghanistan (2001–2021).

== See also ==
- Minnesota Naval Militia
- Minnesota State Guard
- Minnesota Wing Civil Air Patrol
