= 133rd Airlift Wing =

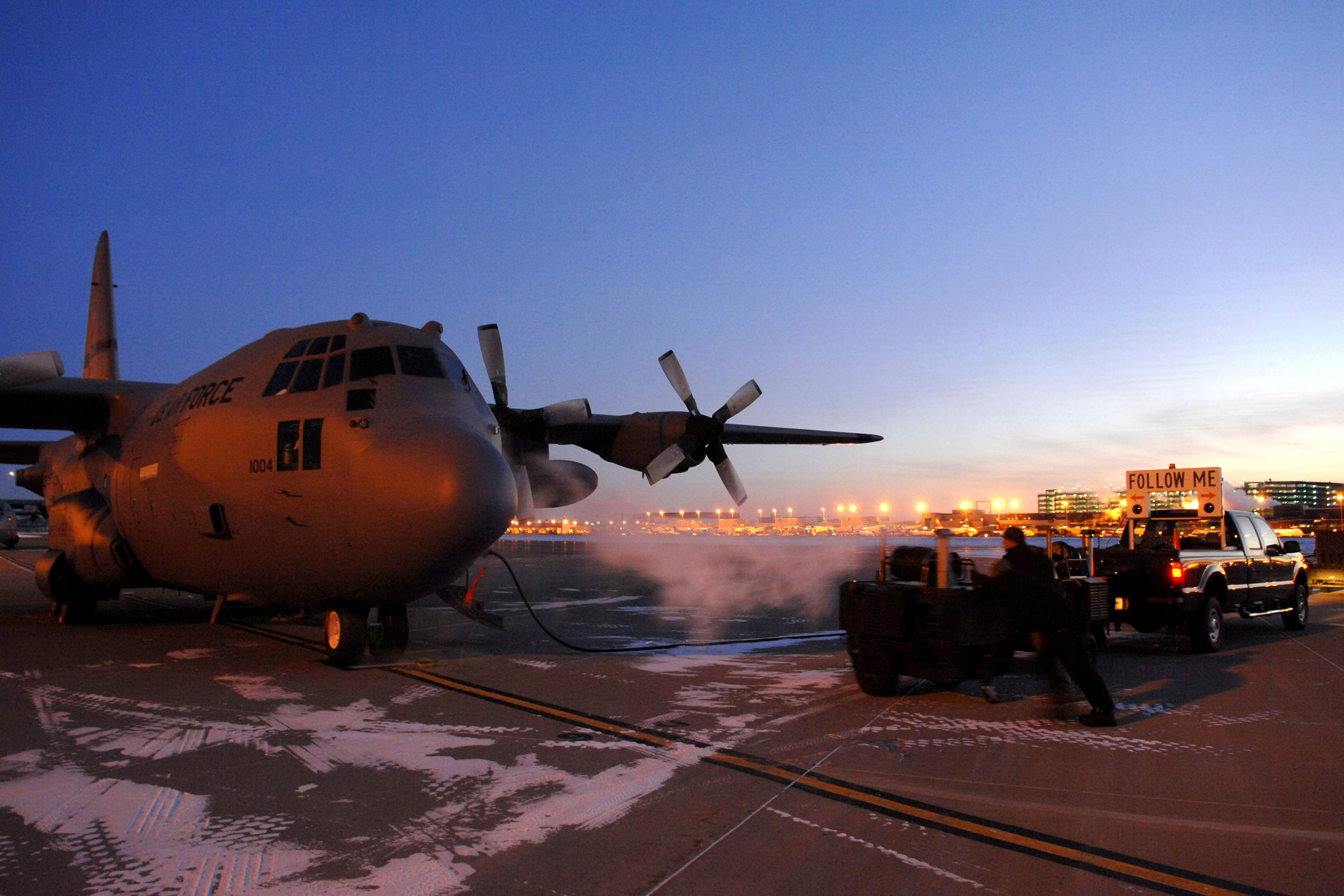
- In the orange light of the setting sun on December 15, 2009, a 133rd Airlift Wing, Minnesota Air National Guard C-130 H3 model cargo aircraft prepares for a cold weather training flight.
- Active: 1943–present
- Country: United States
- Branch: Air National Guard
- Type: Wing
- Role: Airlift
- Part of: Minnesota Air National Guard
- Garrison/HQ: Minneapolis–Saint Paul Joint Air Reserve Station, Minnesota
- Motto: "Citizen's Serving America – Airmen Defending Freedom"
- Tail Code: Dark Maroon tail stripe "Minnesota" in yellow letters

Commanders
- Current commander: Col. Dana E. Novinskie

Insignia
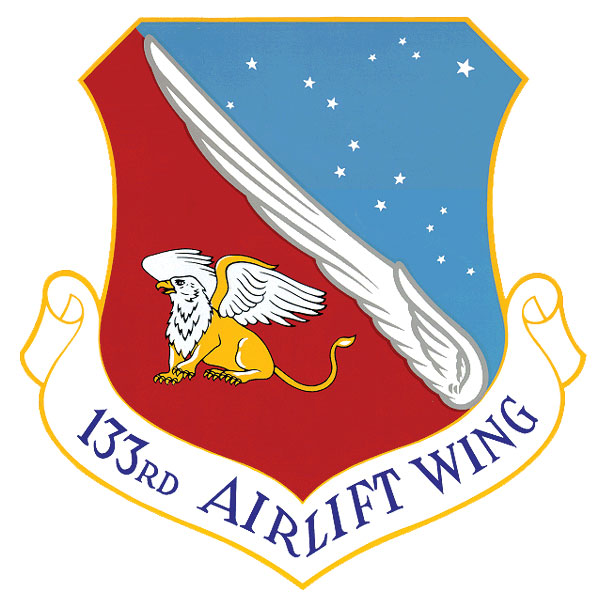
- 133rd Airlift Wing emblem

The 133rd Airlift Wing (133 AW) is a unit of the Minnesota Air National Guard, stationed at Minneapolis–Saint Paul Joint Air Reserve Station, Minnesota. If activated to federal service, the Wing is gained by the United States Air Force Air Mobility Command.

The 109th Airlift Squadron assigned to the Wing's 133rd Operations Group, is a descendant organization of the World War I 109th Aero Squadron, established on August 27, 1917. It was reformed on January 17, 1921, as the 109th Observation Squadron, being the first of 29 aviation National Guard squadrons to receive federal recognition following World War I.

== Overview ==
The 133rd Airlift Wing (AW) is a unit of the Minnesota Air National Guard, stationed at Minneapolis–Saint Paul Joint Air Reserve Station. Gained by the USAF Air Mobility Command if federalized, the unit is an air transport organization flying C-130H Hercules tactical airlifters. Its normal flying operations include air-drop training and transport missions. The four engine C-130 turboprop aircraft can land on short runways or airdrop personnel and equipment into areas lacking an airfield. These capabilities are well suited for disaster relief missions.

The Wing's mission is to provide combat ready air crews, support personnel, and aircraft for the airlift of passengers and cargo anywhere in the world. Upon direction of the Governor, the unit can furnish personnel and equipment, including aircraft, to assist in natural disaster relief or to safeguard life and property in Minnesota.

== History ==
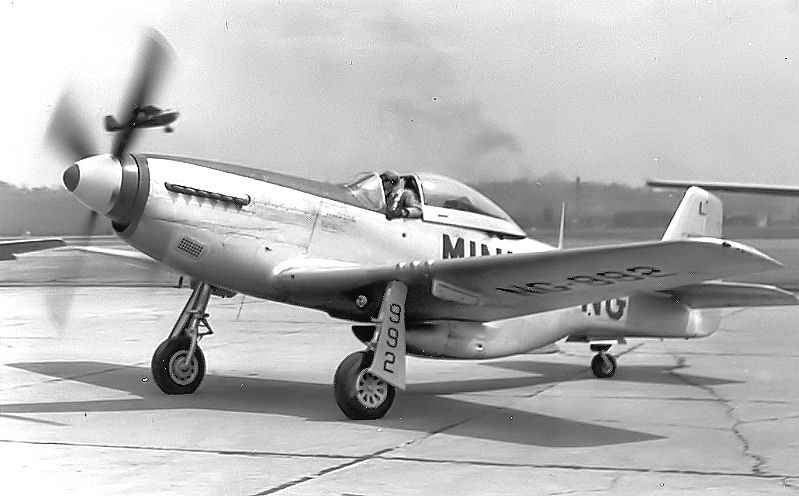
108th FS F-51K Mustang, AF Ser. No. 44-11992

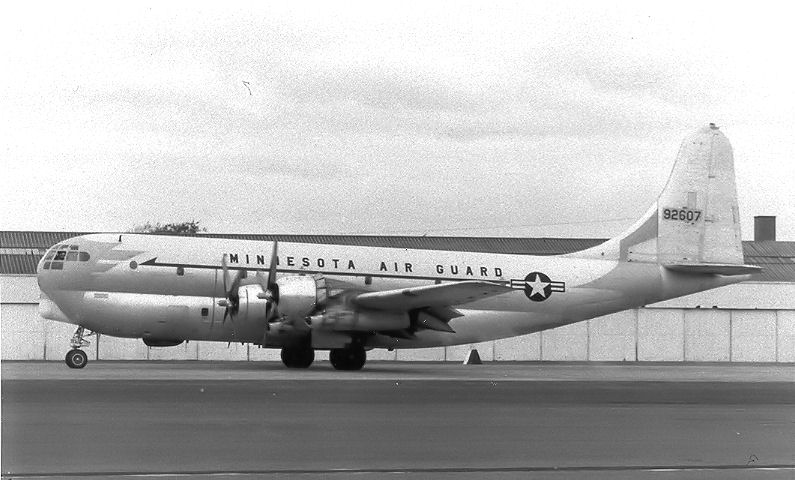
Boeing C-97A Stratofreighter, AF Ser. No. 49-2607, circa 1960

The wartime 367th Fighter Group was reactivated and redesignated as the 133rd Fighter Group, and was allotted to the Minnesota Air National Guard, on May 24, 1946. It was organized at Holman Field, Saint Paul and was extended federal recognition on August 28, 1947, by Air Defense Command. In the fall of 1950, the Air National Guard reorganized under the wing base organization system, and the 133d Fighter Wing was activated on November 1, 1950, to command the 133d Fighter Group and its newly formed support organizations.

=== Air defense ===
On March 2, 1951, the 133rd Fighter Wing was federalized and brought to active duty due to the Korean War and assigned to Air Defense Command (ADC). The 133rd Fighter-Interceptor Group controlled the 109th Fighter-Interceptor Squadron at Minneapolis and the 179th Fighter-Interceptor Squadron at Duluth. The 133rd Wing and Group were inactivated on February 6, 1952, and the squadrons reassigned to the 31st Air Division of Air Defense Command for the remainder of their federal service. The unit was reformed as the 133rd Fighter-Interceptor Wing under Minnesota state control on December 1, 1952.

After the Korean War, the wing was reformed by January 1, 1953, and resumed its air defense mission. Was upgraded by ADC in 1954 to the dedicated F-94A Starfire all-weather interceptor. With this new aircraft, the mission of the 109th Fighter-Interceptor Squadron changed from day interceptor to day and night all-weather interceptor. In 1958 the 109th again upgraded to the improved F-89H Scorpion.

=== Strategic Airlift ===
In 1960, the 133rd FIW was reassigned to Military Air Transport Service (MATS) as its gaining command, trading in its air defense interceptors for 4-engines C-97 Stratofreighter transports. With air transportation recognized as a critical wartime need, the unit was redesignated the 133rd Air Transport Wing, Heavy. During the 1961 Berlin Crisis, the wing was federalized on October 1, 1961. From Minneapolis, the 109th ATS augmented MATS airlift capability worldwide in support of the Air Force's needs. It returned again to Minnesota state control on August 31, 1962. Throughout the 1960s, the unit flew long-distance transport missions in support of Air Force requirements, frequently sending aircraft to Hawaii, Japan, the Philippines, and during the Vietnam War, to both South Vietnam, Okinawa and Thailand.

=== Tactical Airlift ===
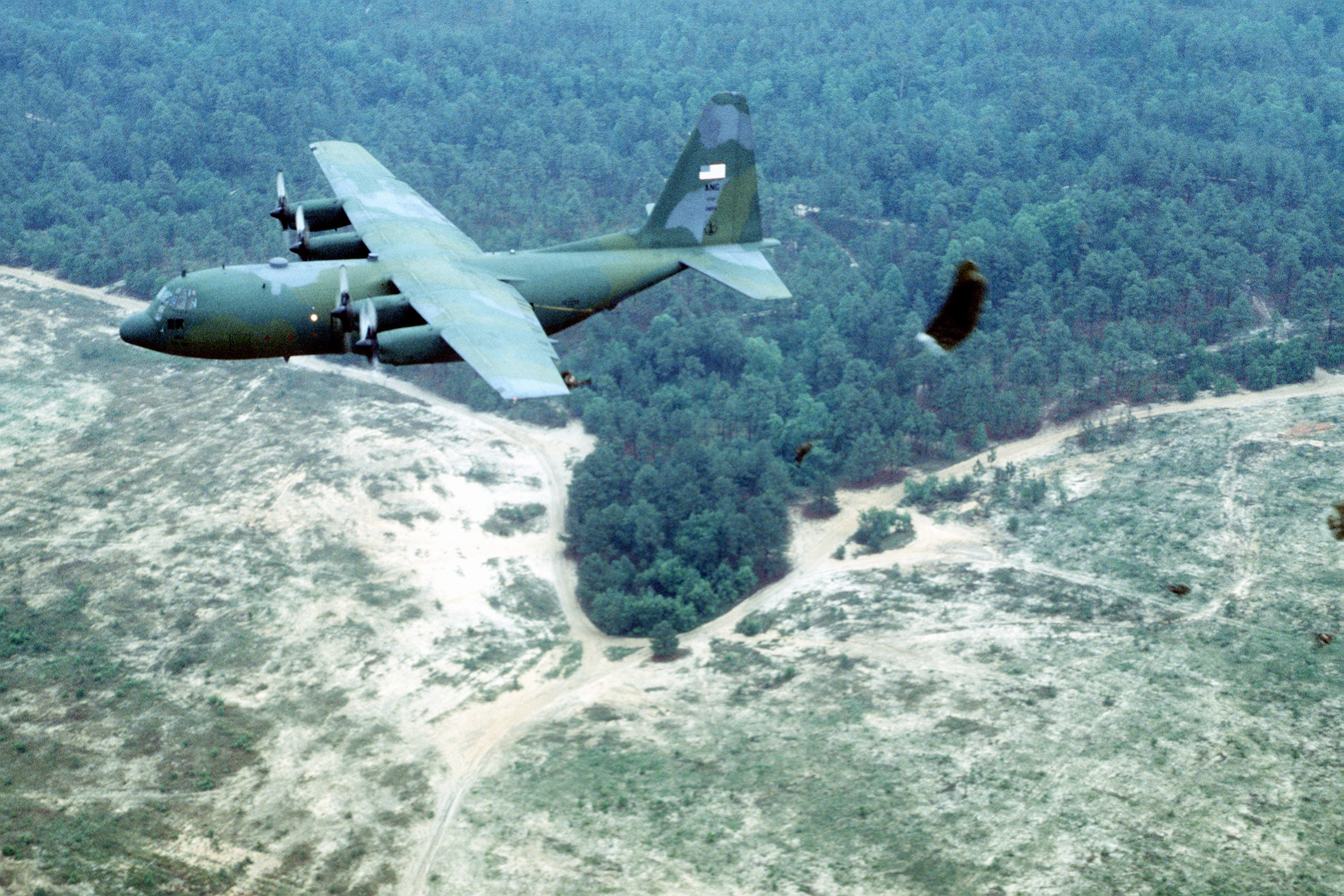
C-130E dropping U.S. Army paratroopers during the "Rodeo 92" airdrop competition at Pope Air Force Base, NC in 1992

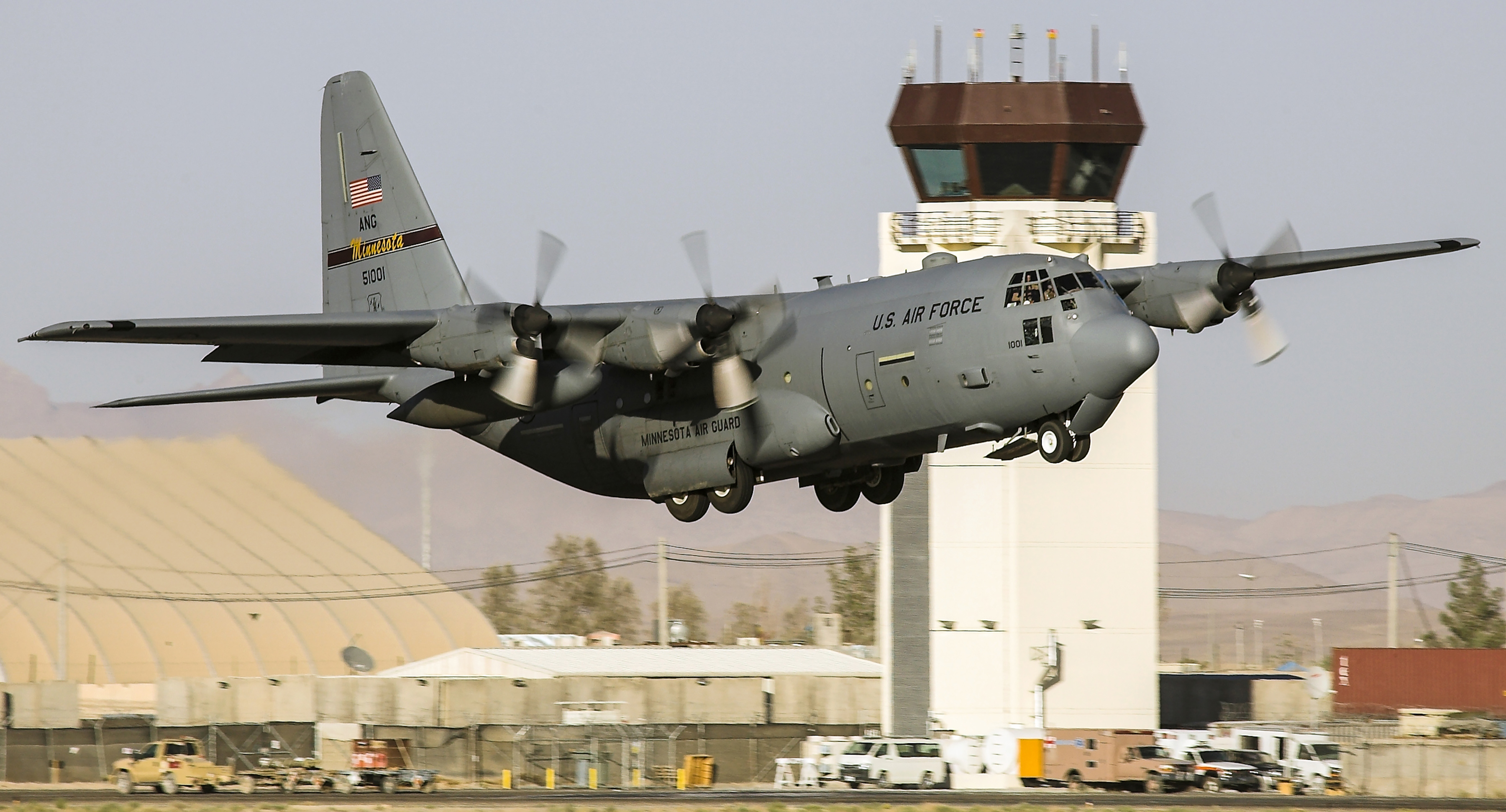
C-130H3 at Kandahar, Afghanistan in 2010

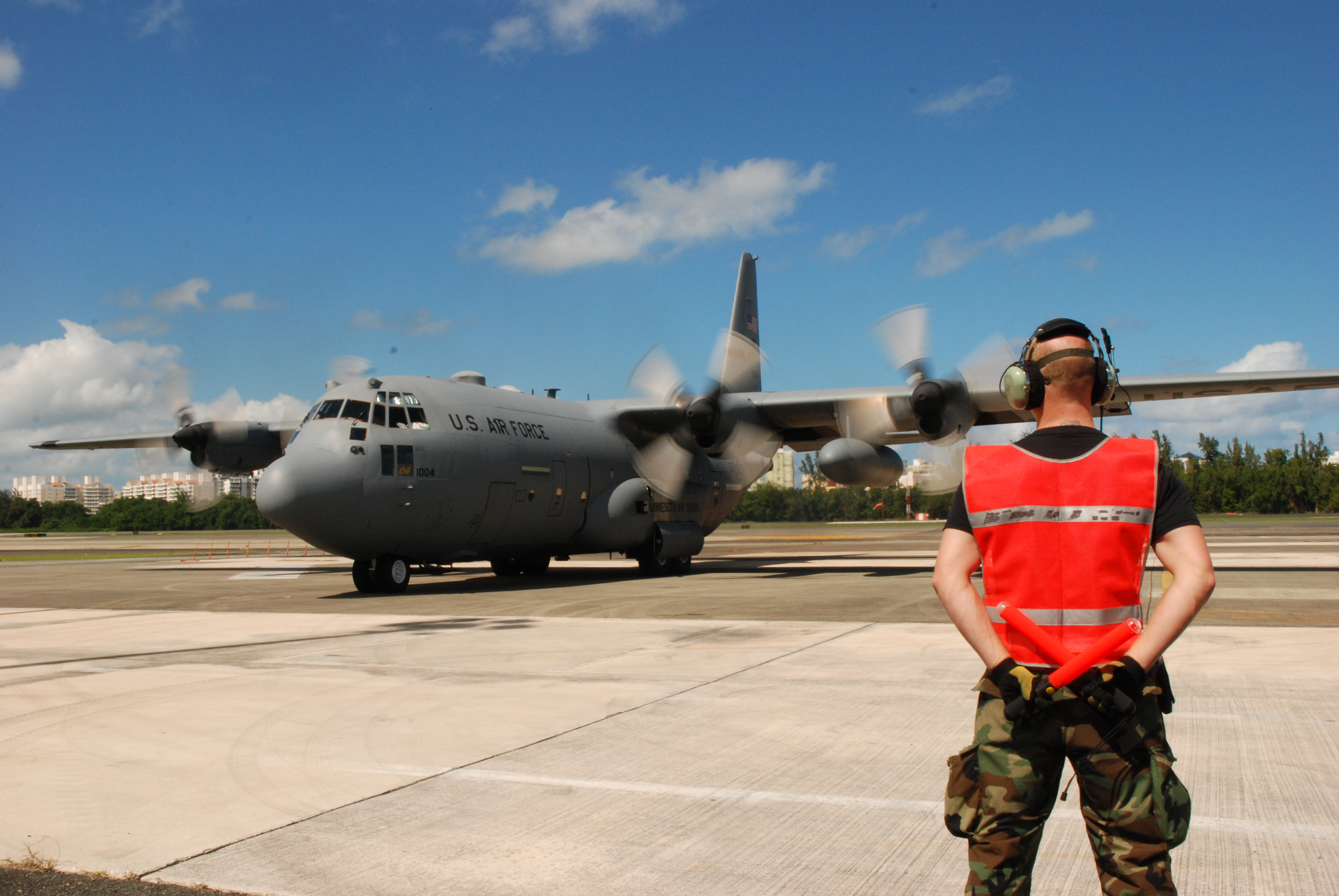
At Muniz Air National Guard Base, Puerto Rico on a two-week rotation in support of the U.S. Southern Command's CORONET OAK mission in 2011

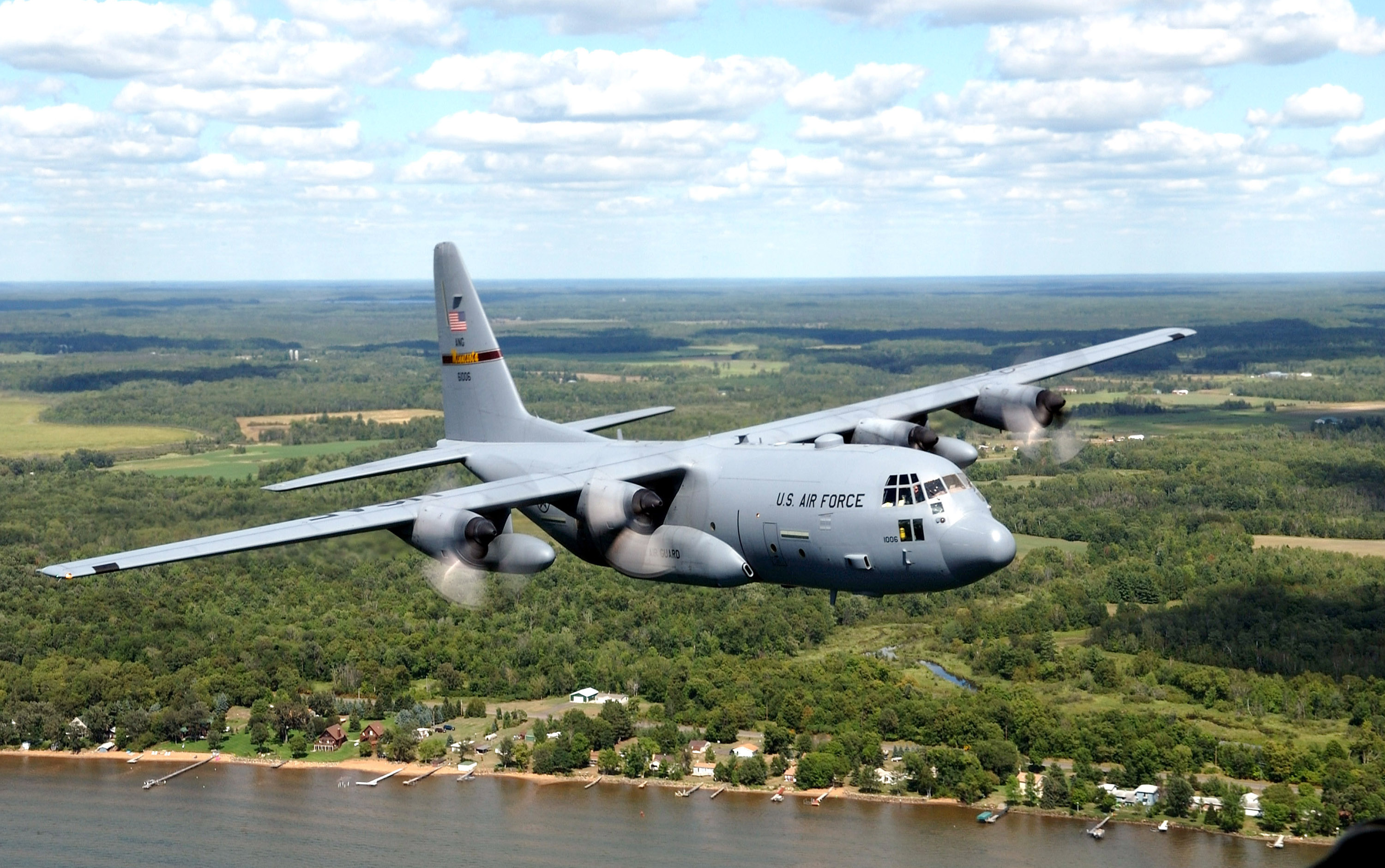
C-130H3 flies over the shore of Mille Lacs Lake area in central Minnesota during a training mission, 2006

The C-97s were retired in 1971 and the 133rd TAW was transferred to Tactical Air Command (TAC) as its gaining command. It transitioned to the C-130A Hercules theater transport, flying missions in support of TAC throughout the United States and Alaska. In 1974 the unit was returned to Military Airlift Command (MAC) when TAC transferred out its troop carrier mission. In the early 1970s, USAF's "Total Force" policy brought the wing into full partnership with its Air Force counterparts by mandating co-operation and teamwork between Air Guard and active duty Air Force units in all phases of military airlift operations. As a result, in succeeding years the unit's C-130s traveled to all corners of the world, airlifting troops, passengers, and cargo during training missions, exercise deployments, and real-world military operations to support Federal and State military airlift requirements.

The unit has been upgraded over the years with newer C-130E aircraft in 1981 and currently flies the C-130H, which it received in 1995. 2011 marked the 90th anniversary of the 1921 decision to make Minnesota's 109th Aero Squadron the first federally recognized National Guard flying unit in the country. To commemorate the heritage of the Minnesota Air National Guard, the 133rd Airlift Wing hosted an Air Expo, welcoming upwards of 15,000 members of the community to the base to celebrate.

During 2011, the 109th Airlift Squadron deployed 528 Airmen to 17 countries, serving in support of U.S. operations worldwide, including humanitarian missions to Africa, Honduras and Indonesia. The squadron provides combat-ready air crews, support personnel, and aircraft for the airlift of passengers and cargo anywhere in the world. Upon direction of the Governor, the unit furnishes personnel and equipment, including aircraft, to assist in natural disaster relief or to safeguard life and property in Minnesota.

== Organization ==
- 133rd Airlift Wing, at Minneapolis–Saint Paul Joint Air Reserve Station
  - 133rd Airlift Wing Headquarters
    - Plans and Programs
    - Chaplain Section
    - Comptroller Flight
    - Inspector General Office
    - Judge Advocate General
    - Military Equal Opportunity Office
    - Public Affairs
    - Wing Safety
    - Director of Psychological Health
    - Sexual Assault Response Coordinator
  - 133rd Mission Support Group
    - 133rd Civil Engineering Squadron
    - 133rd Communications Flight
    - 133rd Force Support Squadron
    - 133rd Logistics Readiness Squadron
    - 133rd Security Forces Squadron
    - 210th Engineering Installation Squadron
  - 133rd Operations Group
    - 109th Airlift Squadron, with C-130H Hercules
    - 109th Aeromedical Evacuation Squadron
    - 133rd Operations Support Squadron
    - 208th Weather Flight
    - Contingency Response Flight
  - 133rd Maintenance Group
    - 133rd Aircraft Maintenance Squadron
    - 133rd Maintenance Squadron
    - 133rd Maintenance Operations Flight
    - Quality Assurance
  - 133rd Medical Group
    - Aerospace Medicine
    - Medical Services
    - Dental Services
    - Health Services
    - Nursing Services
    - Medical Detachment 1 (Chemical, Biological, Radiological, Nuclear Enhanced Response Force — CERF)

== Lineage ==
- Constituted as the 133d Fighter Wing in October 1950

Activated on November 1, 1950
Federalized and placed on active duty on March 1, 1951

- Redesignated 133d Fighter-Interceptor Wing On March 2, 1951

Inactivated on February 6, 1952

- Released from active duty, returned to Minnesota state control and activated on December 1, 1952

Redesignated: 133d Air Defense Wing on April 15, 1956
Redesignated: 133d Air Transport Wing, Heavy on January 15, 1960
Federalized and placed on active duty, October 1, 1961
Released from active duty and returned to Minnesota state control, August 31, 1962
Redesignated: 133d Military Airlift Wing on January 1, 1966
Redesignated: 133d Tactical Airlift Wing on March 20, 1971
Redesignated: 133d Airlift Wing on March 16, 1992

=== Assignments ===
- Minnesota Air National Guard, November 1, 1950
- Tenth Air Force, March 1, 1951
- Eastern Air Defense Force, March 2, 1951
- Central Air Defense Force, May 20, 1951 – February 6, 1952
- Minnesota Air National Guard, December 1, 1952

Gained by: Central Air Defense Force, Air Defense Command
Gained by: Eastern Transport Air Force, military Air Transport Service, July 1, 1960

- Eastern Transport Air Force, October 1, 1961
- Minnesota Air National Guard, August 31, 1962 – present

Gained by: Eastern Transport Air Force, Military Air Transport Service
Gained by: Military Airlift Command, January 8, 1966
Gained by: Tactical Air Command, March 20, 1971
Gained by: Military Airlift Command, December 1, 1974
Gained by: Air Mobility Command, June 1, 1992
Gained by: Air Combat Command, October 1, 1993
Gained by: Air Mobility Command, April 1, 1997 – present

=== Components ===
Groups

- 133rd Fighter Group (later 133d Fighter-Interceptor Group, 133d Fighter Group, 133d Air Transport Group, 133d Military Airlift Group, 133d Tactical Airlift Group, 133d Operations Group, November 1, 1950 – February 6, 1952, December 1, 1952 – February 9, 1975, March 16, 1992 – present
- 133rd Maintenance Group
- 133rd Mission Support Group
- 133rd Medical Group

Squadrons

- 109th Tactical Airlift Squadron (later 109th Airlift Squadron), February 9, 1975 – March 1, 1994

=== Stations ===
- Holman Field, November 1, 1950
- Fort Snelling (later Snelling Air Force Station, January 21, 1951 – February 6, 1952
- Holman Field, December 1, 1952
- Wold-Chamberlain Field (later Minneapolis-St. Paul Metropolitan Airport, Minneapolis–Saint Paul Joint Air Reserve Station), Minnesota, August 28, 1947

=== Aircraft ===
- North American F-51D Mustang, 1950–1954
- Lockheed F-94A Starfire, 1954–1957
- Lockheed F-94B Starfire, 1954–1957
- Lockheed F-94C Starfire, 1957–1960
- Northrop F-89H Scorpion, 1958–1960
- Boeing C-97G Stratofreighter, 1960–1971
- Lockheed C-130A Hercules, 1971–1981
- Lockheed C-130E Hercules, 1981–1995
- Lockheed C-130H Hercules, 1995–present

=== Decorations ===
- Air Force Outstanding Unit Award
