= List of observation squadrons of the United States Army National Guard =

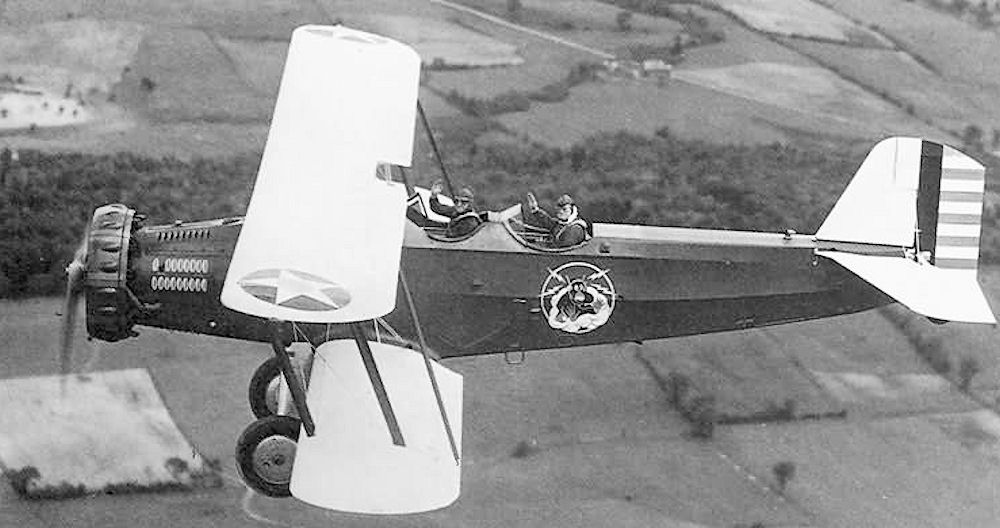
Douglas O-38 102d Observation Squadron, New York National Guard, 1933. The 102d is the oldest and senior squadron in the Air National Guard, dating to April 1908.

The National Guard began forming aerial observation units before World War I. When the United States entered the war in April 1917, about 100 National Guard pilots joined the Aviation Section, U.S. Signal Corps (Later United States Army Air Service).

After the demobilization of the World War I Air Service in 1919, the Militia Bureau and the Air Service agreed on forming postwar National Guard aviation units in 1920. On 17 January 1921 the 109th Observation Squadron of the Minnesota National Guard became the first postwar air unit to receive federal recognition. They flew a wide variety of aircraft during the inter-war period. These included the Curtiss JN-4 "Jenny", Consolidated PT-1 "Trusty", Consolidated PT-3, Northrop BT-1, Douglas O-2 and Consolidated O-17 Courier during 1923–1931; the Douglas O-38 during 1931–1935; and the Douglas O-43 and North American O-47 between 1935 and 1942.

All 29 squadrons (18 of them having lineages dating back to World War I) remain active Air National Guard units today.

== Squadrons ==
Unit	State	Organized	Federal Recognition*	Federalized / Inactivated	Comments
101st Observation Squadron	Massachusetts	22 August 1917	25 January 1923	25 November 1940	Initially World War I 101st Aero Squadron. Deployed to France, was aircraft maintenance unit. demobilized 1919; Re-formed 1923, 26th Division, MA National Guard. Ordered to active service on 25 Nov 1940; allotted to ANG, on 29 Jul 1946; now 101st Intelligence Squadron.
102d Observation Squadron	New York	23 August 1917	17 November 1921	15 October 1940	Origins begin in April 1908 as 1st Aero Company, New York National Guard. Disbanded 1917. World War I 102d Aero Squadron formed from unit personnel. Deployed to France, was primarily a transportation and aircraft maintenance unit. demobilized 1919; Re-formed 1921, 27th Division, NY National Guard. Ordered to active service on 15 Oct 1940; allotted to ANG, on 24 May 1946; now 102d Rescue Squadron. This squadron is recognized as the ANG's oldest unit.
103d Observation Squadron	Pennsylvania	27 June 1924	27 June 1924	17 February 1941	28th Division, PA National Guard. Ordered to active service on 17 Feb 1941; allotted to ANG, on 24 May 1946; now 103d Fighter Squadron, inactivated 2010.
104th Observation Squadron	Maryland	29 June 1921	29 June 1921	3 February 1941	29th Division, MD National Guard. Ordered to active service on 3 Feb 1941; allotted to ANG, on 24 May 1946; now 104th Fighter Squadron
107th Observation Squadron	Michigan	27 August 1917	7 May 1926	15 October 1940	Initially World War I 107th Aero Squadron. Deployed to France, assembled, serviced and repaired aircraft. demobilized 1919; Re-formed 1926, 32d Division, MI National Guard. Ordered to active service on 15 Oct 1940; allotted to ANG, on 24 May 1946; now 107th Fighter Squadron
108th Observation Squadron	Illinois	27 August 1917	1 July 1927	3 February 1941	Initially World War I 108th Aero Squadron. Deployed to France, repaired and maintained aircraft. demobilized 1919; Re-formed 1927, 33d Division, IL National Guard. Ordered to active service on 3 Feb 1941; allotted to ANG, on 24 May 1946; now 108th Air Refueling Squadron
109th Observation Squadron	Minnesota	27 August 1917	17 January 1921	10 February 1941	Initially World War I 109th Aero Squadron, deployed to France, primarily a transportation unit on Western Front, demobilized 1919; Re-formed 1921, 34th Division, MN National Guard. Ordered to active service on 10 Feb 1941; allotted to ANG, on 24 May 1946; now 109th Airlift Squadron
110th Observation Squadron	Missouri	14 August 1917	23 June 1923	23 December 1940	Initially World War I 110th Aero Squadron, assigned to Kelly Field, Texas, as a repair squadron, later re-designated as 804th Aero Squadron, "Squadron K, Kelly Field"; demobilized 1918. Re-formed 1923, 35th Division, MO National Guard. Ordered to active service on 23 Dec 1940; allotted to ANG, on 24 May 1946; now 110th Bombardment Squadron
111th Observation Squadron	Texas	14 August 1917	29 June 1923	25 December 1940	Initially World War I 111th Aero Squadron, operated as a supply unit at Kelly Field, Texas, later re-designated as 632d Aero Squadron, demobilized 1919. Re-formed 1923, 36th Division, TX National Guard. Ordered to active service on 25 Dec 1940; allotted to ANG, on 24 May 1946; now 111th Reconnaissance Squadron
112th Observation Squadron	Ohio	18 August 1917	20 June 1927	25 November 1940	Initially World War I 112th Aero Squadron, remained in United States, demobilized 1919; Re-formed 1927, 37th Division, OH National Guard. Ordered to active service on 25 Nov 1940; allotted to ANG, on 24 May 1946; now 112th Fighter Squadron
113th Observation Squadron	Indiana	26 August 1917	1 August 1921	17 January 1941	Initially World War I 113th Aero Squadron, remained in United States, demobilized 1919; Re-formed 1921, 38th Division, IN National Guard. Ordered to active service on 17 Jan 1941; allotted to ANG, on 24 May 1946; now 113th Air Support Operations Squadron
114th Observation Squadron; 106th Observation Squadron	Alabama	27 August 1917	21 January 1922	25 November 1940	Initially World War I 106th Aero Squadron, deployed to France, repaired and maintained aircraft, demobilized 1919; reformed as 114th Observation Squadron; consolidated (1936) with 135th Squadron (organized 21 Jan 1922); served from 1923 with 39th Division to 1924 and thereafter with 31st Division, AL National Guard. Ordered to active service on 25 Nov 1940; re-designated: 100th Bombardment Squadron (Medium) on 9 May 1944; allotted to ANG on 24 May 1946; now 106th Air Refueling Squadron
115th Observation Squadron	California	28 August 1917	16 June 1924	3 March 1941	Initially World War I 115th Aero Squadron. Deployed to France, Constructed facilities and engaged in supply and related base support activities, demobilized 1919; Re-formed 1924, 40th Division, CA National Guard. Ordered to active service on 3 March 1941; allotted to ANG, on 24 May 1946; now 115th Airlift Squadron
116th Observation Squadron	Washington	29 August 1917	6 August 1924	16 September 1940	Initially World War I 116th Aero Squadron, deployed to France. Performed transportation and supply missions on the Western Front, demobilized 1919; Re-formed 1924, 41st Division, WA National Guard. Ordered to active service on 16 September 1940; allotted to ANG, on 24 May 1946; now 116th Air Refueling Squadron.
118th Observation Squadron	Connecticut	31 August 1917	1 November 1923	24 February 1941	Initially World War I 118th Aero Squadron, deployed to France. Constructed facilities, repaired aircraft and equipment, and served as a transportation and supply missions on the Western Front, demobilized 1919; Re-formed 1923, 43d Division, CT National Guard. Ordered to active service on 16 September 1940; allotted to ANG, on 24 May 1946; now 118th Airlift Squadron.
119th Observation Squadron	New Jersey	8 June 1917	30 January 1930	18 October 1942	Initially World War I 5th Aviation School Squadron (later 119th Aero Squadron), remained in the United States, demobilized 1919; Re-formed 1930, 44th Division, NJ National Guard. Inactivated 18 October 1942. Reactivated 1 March 1943, re-designated 490th Fighter Squadron allotted to ANG, on 24 May 1946; now 119th Fighter Squadron
120th Observation Squadron	Colorado	28 August 1917	27 June 1923	6 January 1941	Initially World War I 120th Aero Squadron, deployed to England. primarily aircraft maintenance unit, demobilized 1919; Re-formed 1923, 45th Division, CO National Guard. Ordered to active service on 6 January 1941; allotted to ANG, on 24 May 1946; now 120th Fighter Squadron
121st Observation Squadron	District of Columbia	10 July 1940	10 April 1941	1 September 1941	DC National Guard. Ordered to active service on 1 Sep 1941; allotted to ANG, on 24 May 1946; now 121st Fighter Squadron
122d Observation Squadron	Louisiana	30 July 1940	2 March 1941	1 October 1941	LA National Guard, Ordered to active service on 1 October 1941; re-designated 885th Bombardment Squadron, 12 May 1944. allotted to ANG, on 24 May 1946; now 122d Fighter Squadron.
123d Observation Squadron	Oregon	30 July 1940	18 April 1941	15 September 1941	OR National Guard, Ordered to active service on 18 April 1941; re-designated 35th Photo Reconnaissance Squadron, 11 August 1943. allotted to ANG on 24 May 1946; now 123d Fighter Squadron
124th Observation Squadron	Iowa	30 July 1940	25 February 1941	15 September 1941	IA National Guard, Ordered to active service on 15 September 1941; allotted to ANG, on 24 May 1946; now 124th Fighter Squadron
125th Observation Squadron	Oklahoma	30 July 1940	15 February 1941	15 September 1941	OK National Guard, Ordered to active service on 15 September 1941; allotted to ANG, on 24 May 1946; now 125th Fighter Squadron
126th Observation Squadron	Wisconsin	30 July 1940	12 November 1940	2 June 1941	WI National Guard; Ordered to active service on 15 September 1941; re-designated 34th Photographic Reconnaissance Squadron on 11 Aug 1943; allotted to ANG on 24 May 1946; now 126th Air Refueling Squadron
127th Observation Squadron	Kansas	30 July 1940	4 August 1941	6 October 1941	KS National Guard, Ordered to active service on 6 October 1941; allotted to ANG, on 24 May 1946; now 127th Command and Control Squadron
128th Observation Squadron	Georgia	1 February 1918	1 May 1941	15 September 1941	Initially World War I 840th Aero Squadron, deployed to France. repaired and rebuilt damaged aircraft on the Western Front, demobilized 1919; Re-formed 1940, GA National Guard. Ordered to active service on 15 September 1941; allotted to ANG, on 24 May 1946;; now 128th Airborne Command and Control Squadron
136th Observation Squadron; 105th Observation Squadron	Tennessee	27 August 1917	4 December 1921	18 October 1942	Initially World War I 105th Aero Squadron, deployed to France. operated as a supply unit, demobilized 1919; reformed as 105th Observation Squadron; consolidated (1936) with 136th Squadron (organized 4 Dec 1921), 30th Division, TN National Guard; Inactivated on 18 October 1942; Re-activated on 1 March 1943 as 105th Reconnaissance Squadron (Bombardment); allotted to ANG on 24 May 1946; now 105th Airlift Squadron
152d Observation Squadron	Rhode Island	21 August 1939	13 October 1939	25 November 1940	RI National Guard, Ordered to active service on 25 November 1940; re-designated: 37th Photographic Reconnaissance Squadron, 15 June 1943. allotted to ANG, on 24 May 1946; now Rhode Island ANG 143d Airlift Squadron
153d Observation Squadron	Mississippi	18 August 1939	27 September 1939	15 October 1940	MS National Guard, Ordered to active service on 15 October 1940; allotted to ANG, on 24 May 1946; now 153d Air Refueling Squadron
154th Observation Squadron	Arkansas	8 December 1917	24 October 1925	16 September 1940	Initially World War I 154th Aero Squadron, deployed first to England, then France. Repaired and maintained aircraft on the Western Front. demobilized 1919; reformed as 154th Observation Squadron 1925, Aviation Corps, AR National Guard; Ordered to active service on 16 Sep 1940; allotted to ANG on 24 May 1946; now 154th Training Squadron

* Note: The "Federal Recognition" date is the effective date the unit was accepted for National Guard service. Demobilized World War I Air Service units were reconstituted and consolidated with the new units effective that date.

During World War II, these units were federalized and were re-equipped with more modern aircraft. As part of the Army Air Corps, the units were transformed from observation organizations into reconnaissance, liaison, fighter, and bombardment squadrons. They served in every major combat theater during the war. The most significant wartime contribution of National Guard aviators was to train and lead the large numbers of volunteer airmen who had entered the AAF. That role was epitomized by Lieutenant Colonel Addison E. Baker, a Guardsman from Akron, Ohio. On 1 August 1943, Baker commanded the VIII Bomber Command's 93d Bombardment Group on a daring but ill-fated low-level attack against enemy oil refineries at Ploesti, Romania. Baker was posthumously awarded the Medal of Honor for his heroic leadership.

== See also ==
- Air National Guard
