= Speedway Field =

Precursor to Minneapolis-St. Paul International Airport

Coordinates: 44.889°N 93.215°W

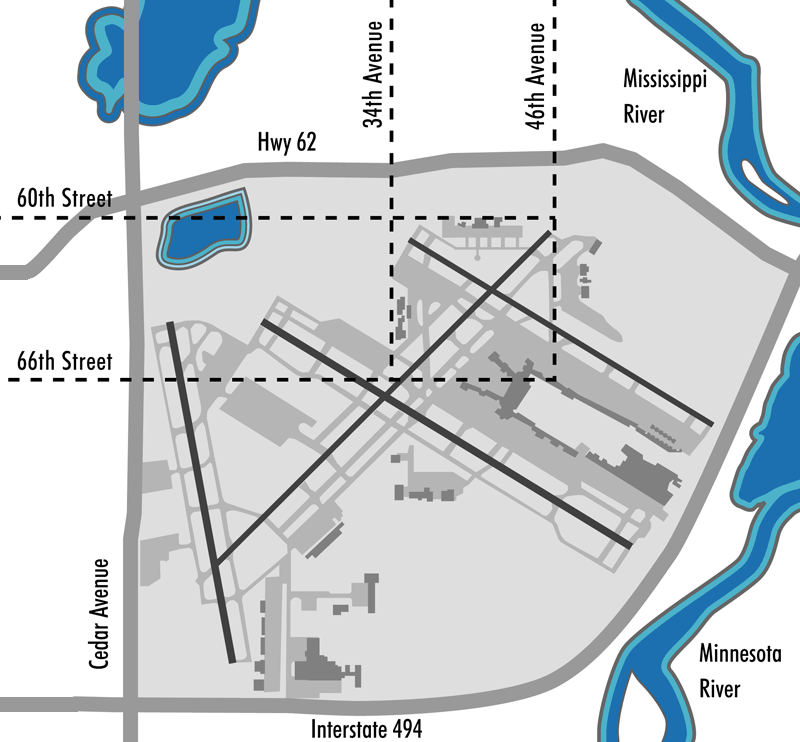
Map showing the Minneapolis-St. Paul International Airport with the original boundaries of the Twin Cities Speedway race track/Speedway Field that preceded it

Speedway Field was the original name for the airfield that evolved into Minneapolis-St. Paul International Airport, the twelfth busiest airport in the United States; it was also the largest hub for Northwest Airlines and is the second largest hub for Delta Air Lines, Northwest's successor.

Speedway Field has its beginning on December 11, 1919, when the Adjutant General recommended to civic groups of Minneapolis and Saint Paul in the U.S. state of Minnesota that the site of the bankrupted Twin City Motor Speedway be acquired for a new airfield.

The 160 acres (0.65 km^{2}) of land inside the concrete race track oval was first used as an airfield in 1920. It was known as "Speedway Field" and also "Snelling Field" before being dedicated Wold-Chamberlain Field after two World War I pilots, Ernest Groves Wold and Cyrus Foss Chamberlain on July 10, 1923.

Map showing Speedway Field and locations of runways and structures

1. Access to the airfield inside the oval was originally through tunnels under the race track.
2. The field used landing strips W-SE - 2700' E-W 2300'
3. Hangars for National Guard Observation Squadron were constructed in 1921 with an appropriation of approximately $45,000 from the Minnesota Legislature.
4. The first hangar for airmail (80' x 90') constructed in 1920 were financed by $15,000 from Northwest Airlines.
5. The U.S. Navy Squadron hangar was constructed in 1928.
6. Minneapolis Park Board took possession of the field on June 1, 1928. At that time, there was an airmail hangar, three National Guard hangars, a Navy hangar, and one additional small hangar.
