= Curtiss Northwest Airport (Minnesota) =

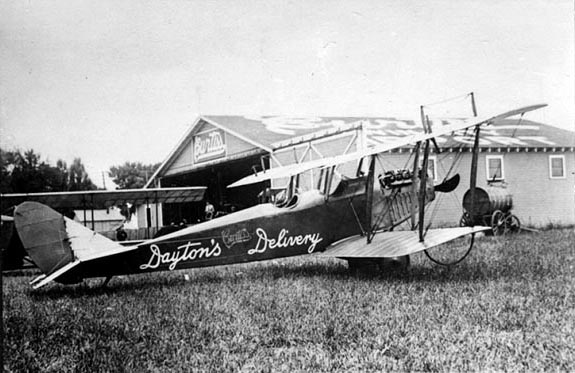
Curtiss Jenny plane at Curtiss Northwest Airport

Curtiss Northwest Airport was a small airfield at the intersection of Snelling and Larpenteur Avenues in present-day Falcon Heights. One of Minnesota's first centers of aviation, it opened in 1919 and closed in 1930. Curtiss Field, a city park named for the airport, still occupies a portion of the site, while a nearby restaurant displays several photos of the old landing strip. In 2008 St. Paul author Roger Bergerson published a comprehensive history of Curtiss Northwest Airport, which is available at online retailers, local bookstores and public libraries.
