= R. Scott Williams =

American Air Force general

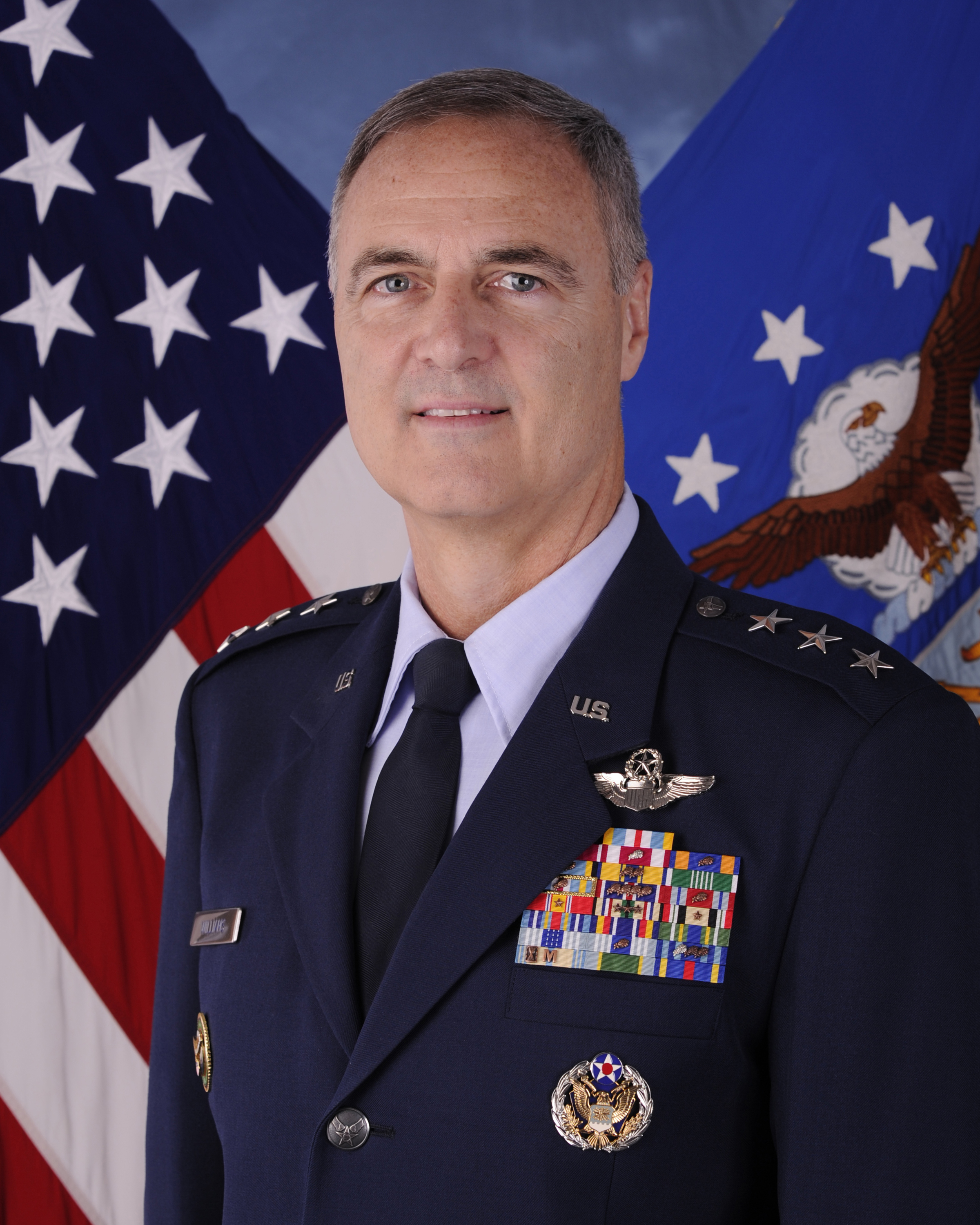
- Born: Colorado Springs, Colorado
- Military career
- Allegiance: United States
- Branch: United States Air Force
- Service years: 1984–2019
- Rank: Lieutenant General
- Commands: First Air Force; Continental NORAD Region; Air National Guard Readiness Center; 169th Fighter Wing; 169th Operations Group
- Conflicts: Iraq War
- Awards: Air Force Distinguished Service Medal; Defense Superior Service Medal; Legion of Merit (2)

Robert Scott Williams is a retired lieutenant general in the United States Air Force. He final assignment was the commander of the First Air Force at Tyndall Air Force Base. He has over 3,900 flight hours, including 300 combat hours.

== Air Force career ==
After graduating with a bachelor's degree in aerospace engineering from Georgia Institute of Technology, Williams commissioned as a second lieutenant in the United States Air Force in November 1984. He attended pilot training at Columbus Air Force Base, and subsequently served as a T-38 Talon instructor pilot. In 1990, he transitioned to flying the F-16 Fighting Falcon, and later served as a fighter pilot at Macdill Air Force Base, Spangdahlem Air Base, Osan Air Base, and McEntire Joint National Guard Base. Additionally, he was the branch and division chief in several departments at the Air National Guard Readiness Center (ANGRC) and The Pentagon. He attended the National Defense University and commanded the 169th Operations Group, the 169th Fighter Wing, and the ANGRC. He was the chief of the Office of Military Cooperation in the United States Embassy in Kuwait. In July 2016, he assumed command of the First Air Force and the Continental NORAD Region. In July 2019, he retired from the United States Air Force.

== Awards and decorations ==
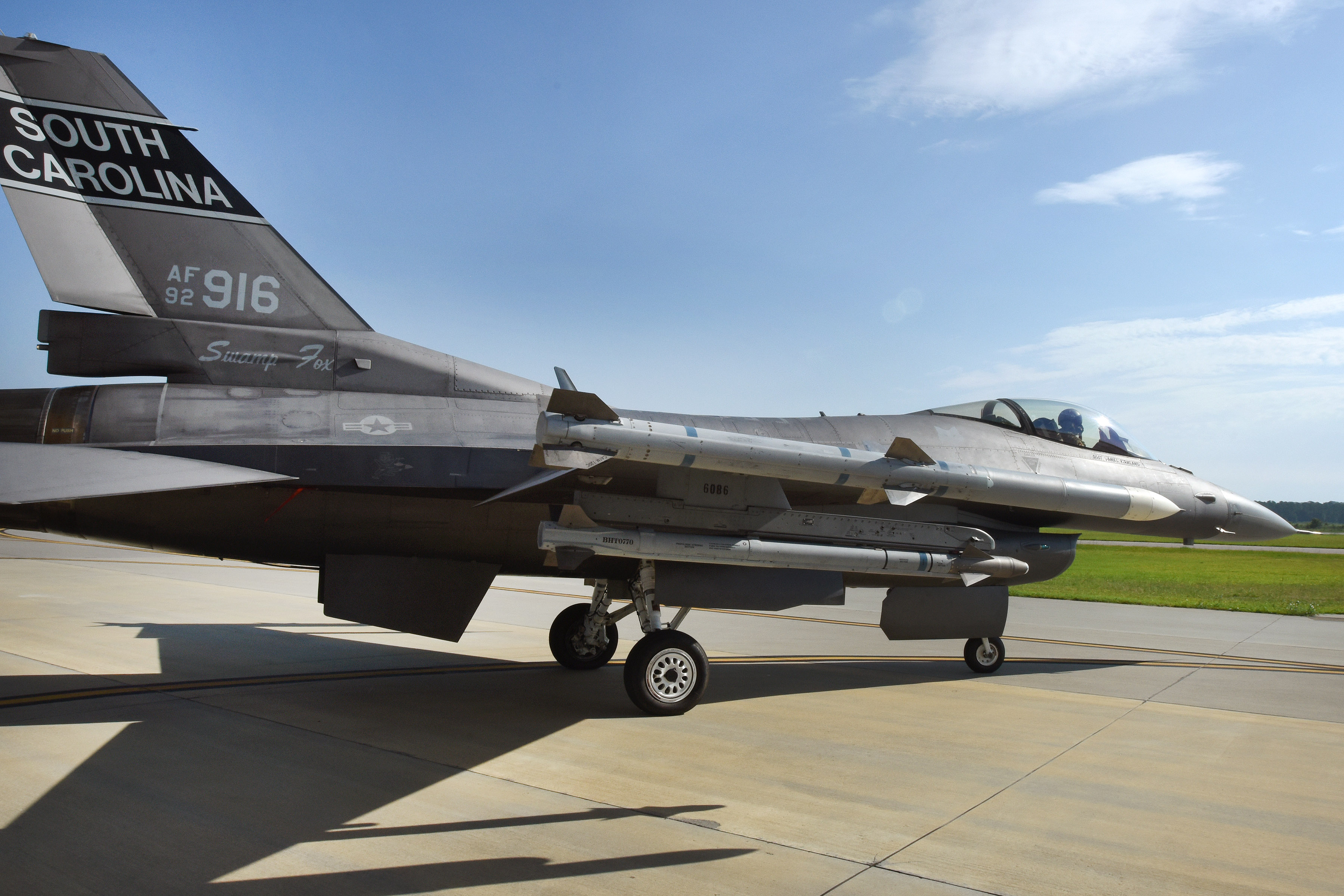
Lt. Gen. R. Scott Williams taxis an F-16 at McEntire JNGB.

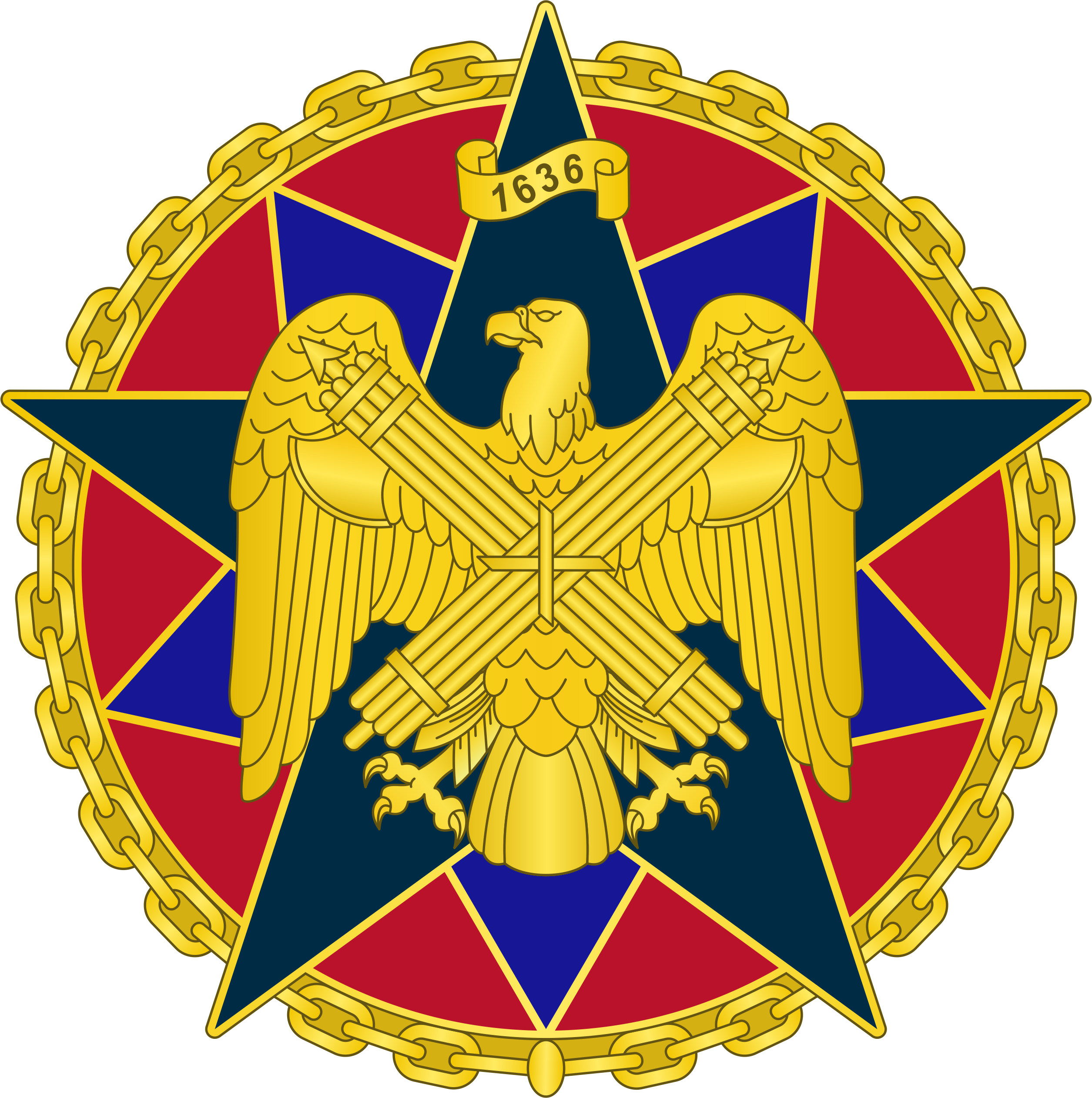
US Air Force Command Pilot Badge
Headquarters Air Force Badge
National Guard Bureau Organizational Badge

Air Force Distinguished Service Medal
Defense Superior Service Medal
Legion of Merit with one bronze oak leaf cluster
Meritorious Service Medal with one silver oak leaf cluster
Air Medal with oak leaf cluster
Aerial Achievement Medal with oak leaf cluster
Air Force Commendation Medal with two oak leaf clusters
Army Commendation Medal
Joint Meritorious Unit Award with oak leaf cluster
Air Force Outstanding Unit Award with four oak leaf clusters
National Defense Service Medal with one bronze service star
Southwest Asia Service Medal with three bronze service stars
Iraq Campaign Medal with bronze service star
Global War on Terrorism Expeditionary Medal
Global War on Terrorism Service Medal
Korea Defense Service Medal
Air Force Overseas Short Tour Service Ribbon
Air Force Overseas Long Tour Service Ribbon with bronze oak leaf cluster
Air Force Longevity Service Award with one silver and two bronze oak leaf clusters
Armed Forces Reserve Medal with bronze Hourglass device and "M" device
Small Arms Expert Marksmanship Ribbon
Air Force Training Ribbon

== Effective dates of promotion ==
Insignia	Rank	Date
	Lieutenant general	July 6, 2016
	Major general	June 2, 2014
	Brigadier general	July 30, 2010
	Colonel	June 30, 2005
	Lieutenant colonel	Oct 13, 2001
	Major	Aug 1, 1996
	Captain	Nov 2, 1988
	First lieutenant	Nov 2, 1986
	Second lieutenant	Nov 2, 1984

Military offices
Preceded by William Etter	First Air Force; 2016–2019	Succeeded by Marc H. Sasseville
Preceded by Brian Neal	Air National Guard Readiness Center; 2012–2014	Succeeded by Michael Taheri
