= Randolph Staudenraus =

U.S. Air Force general

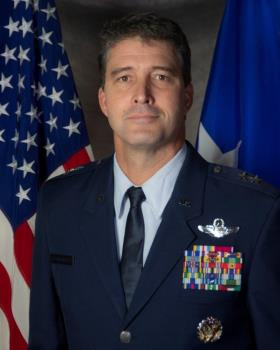
- Military career
- Allegiance: United States
- Branch: United States Air Force
- Service years: 1987–present
- Rank: Major General
- Commands: 175th Wing; 175th Operations Group
- Conflicts: Gulf War
- Awards: Defense Superior Service Medal; Legion of Merit; Distinguished Flying Cross

Randolph J. Staudenraus is a United States Air Force major general who has served as the Director of Strategic Plans and Policy, and International Affairs of the National Guard Bureau from September 2020. Previously, he was the Senior Defense Official and Defense Attaché to Kuwait from May 2020 to September 2020.

Military offices
Preceded by ???	Director of Plans and Programs of the Air National Guard Readiness Center; 2011–2013	Succeeded by Bradley Swanson
Preceded by Scott L. Kelly	Commander of the 175th Wing; 2015–2018	Succeeded by Paul D. Johnson
Preceded by ???	Senior Defense Official and Defense Attaché to Kuwait; 2020	Succeeded by Darrin Slaten
Preceded by John P. Hronek	Director of Strategic Plans and Policy, and International Affairs of the National Guard Bureau; 2020–present	Incumbent
