= Steven Nordhaus =

American general (born 1966)

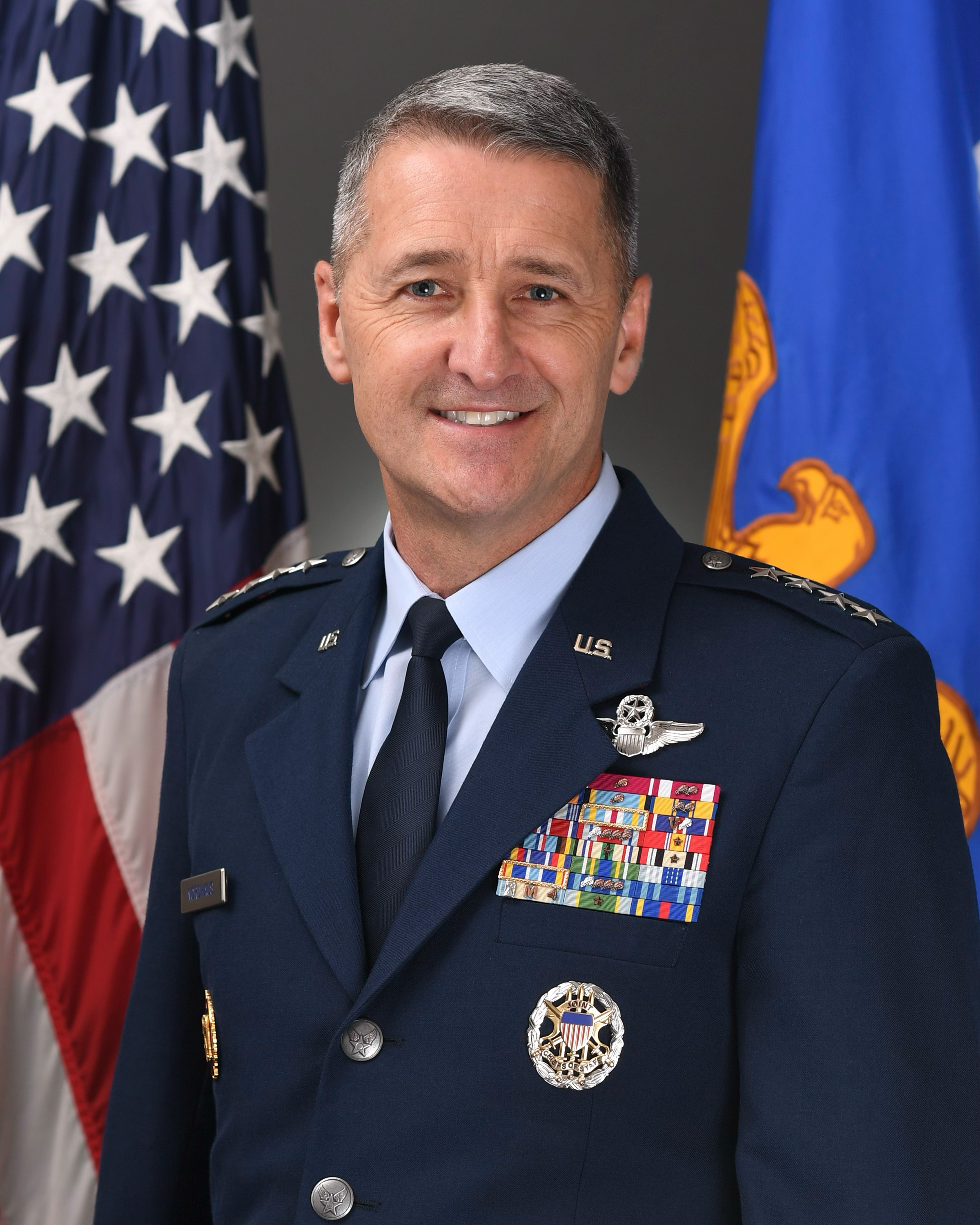
- Official portrait, 2024
- Born: 13 October 1966 (age 59)
- Education: United States Air Force Academy (BS); Columbia Southern University (MS)
- Military career
- Allegiance: United States
- Branch: United States Air Force
- Service years: 1989–present
- Rank: General
- Commands: Chief of the National Guard Bureau; First Air Force; Air National Guard Readiness Center; 180th Fighter Wing; 112th Fighter Squadron
- Conflicts: Iraqi no-fly zones conflict; Operation Southern Watch; Operation Vigilant Warrior; Operation Northern Watch; Iraq War; War in Afghanistan
- Awards: Defense Superior Service Medal (2); Legion of Merit (2)
- Steven Nordhaus's voice Nordhaus's opening statement at his confirmation hearing to be chief of the National Guard Bureau; Recorded 12 September 2024

Steven Scott Nordhaus (born 13 October 1966) is an American general who has served as the 30th chief of the National Guard Bureau since 2024. He was commissioned from the United States Air Force Academy in 1989, and spent much of his career as an F-16 pilot. Nordhaus was deployed for the Iraqi no-fly zones conflict, the Iraq War, and the war in Afghanistan. He has achieved the United States Air Force rating of command pilot, having more than 3,000 flight hours. His notable commands have included the 112th Fighter Squadron from 2002 to 2006, the 180th Fighter Wing from 2011 to 2013, the Air National Guard Readiness Center from 2017 to 2019, and the First Air Force and Air Forces Northern from 2023 to 2024.

== Personal life ==
Born on 13 October 1966, Steven Scott Nordhaus is the son of Donald David Nordhaus and Sandra Susan Nordhaus. Raised in Ottawa, Ohio, Nordhaus attended Ottawa-Glandorf High School, graduating in 1985. He is a 1989 graduate of the United States Air Force Academy with a Bachelor of Science degree in engineering. Nordhaus earned a Master of Science degree in organizational leadership from Columbia Southern University in 2013. Nordhaus and his wife Shannon have five children and at least six grandchildren.

== Military career ==
Nordhaus underwent undergraduate pilot training at Sheppard Air Force Base, Texas, from August 1989 to October 1990. He then underwent more training from October to December 1990 at Holloman Air Force Base, New Mexico, and from January to August 1991 at MacDill Air Force Base, Florida. After his training, Nordhaus served as an F-16 Fighting Falcon pilot with the 309th Tactical Fighter Squadron at Homestead Air Force Base, Florida, from September 1991 to August 1992. He then became an F-16 flight lead, instructor, and evaluator in the 79th Fighter Squadron at Shaw Air Force Base, South Carolina, until July 1996. Nordhaus completed the Squadron Officer School in 1996.

Nordhaus was an F-16 instructor and evaluator, and also the assistant chief of standardization and evaluation, at the Kunsan Air Base, South Korea, until August 1997. From September 1997 to September 1998, he had the same role and was also a flight commander at Mountain Home Air Force Base, Idaho. He then served in the same role with the 112th Fighter Squadron, at the Toledo Air National Guard Base, Ohio, until October 2002. During the 1990s, Nordhaus took part in Operation Southern Watch, Vigilant Warrior, and Northern Watch against Saddam Hussein's Iraq. He completed the Air Command and Staff College in 2002, and later took part in the Iraq War and the war in Afghanistan. Nordhaus became a command pilot with more than 3,000 flight hours.

From November 2002 to November 2006, Nordhaus commanded the 112th Fighter Squadron at Toledo ANGB, Ohio. He also completed the Air War College by correspondence in 2006. He was then the air sovereignty alert detachment commander in the 180th Fighter Wing until July 2009. From then until January 2011, Nordhaus was the vice commander of the 180th Fighter Wing at Toledo. He then served as the commander of the 180th until December 2013. He was a national security studies management course fellow at Syracuse University, in Syracuse, New York, in 2013. His next assignment was as executive assistant to the chief of the National Guard Bureau at the Pentagon, until March 2015.

From March 2015 to January 2017, Nordhaus served as deputy director of operations at the North American Aerospace Defence Command. From February 2017 to November 2019, he was the commander of the Air National Guard Readiness Center. Nordhaus then served as the director of operations of the National Guard Bureau until August 2022. Next, he served as special assistant to the director of the Air National Guard, from September 2022 to March 2023. He served as the commander of First Air Force from March 2023 to October 2024.

In July 2024, Nordhaus was nominated for promotion to general and appointment as chief of the National Guard Bureau. He was promoted to general and assumed his new appointment on 2 October 2024. He officially assumed the role in a ceremony on 15 October 2024.

== Awards and decorations ==

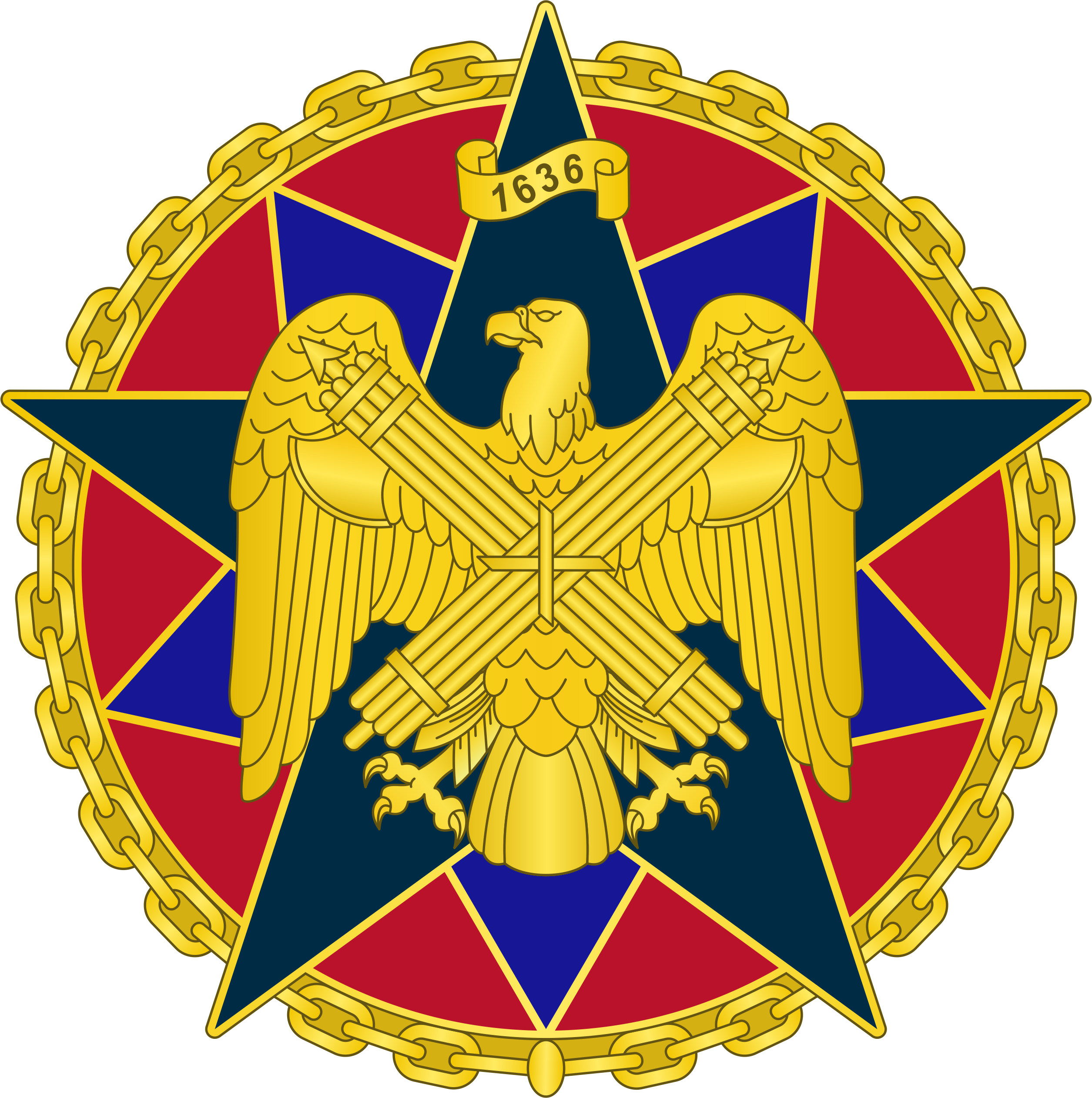

Joint Chiefs of Staff Badge
US Air Force Command Pilot Badge
Defense Superior Service Medal with two bronze oak leaf clusters	Legion of Merit with one bronze oak leaf cluster	Meritorious Service Medal with two bronze oak leaf clusters
Air Medal with one bronze oak leaf cluster	Aerial Achievement Medal with one bronze oak leaf cluster	Air and Space Commendation Medal with two bronze oak leaf clusters
Air Force Achievement Medal	Joint Meritorious Unit Award	Air and Space Outstanding Unit Award with one silver oak leaf cluster and "V" device
Air and Space Organizational Excellence Award	Gallant Unit Citation with eight oak leaf clusters	National Defense Service Medal with service star
Armed Forces Expeditionary Medal	Southwest Asia Service Medal with service star	Iraq Campaign Medal with service star
Global War on Terrorism Service Medal	Korea Defense Service Medal	Air Force Overseas Short Tour Service Ribbon
Air and Space Expeditionary Service Ribbon with gold frame	Air and Space Longevity Service Award with eight oak leaf clusters	Air and Space Longevity Service Award
Armed Forces Reserve Medal with silver Hourglass device	Marksmanship ribbon with service star	Air and Space Training Ribbon
National Guard Bureau Organizational Badge

== Effective dates of promotion ==
Insignia	Rank	Date
	General	2 October 2024
	Lieutenant General	31 March 2023
	Major General	19 July 2018
	Brigadier General	27 July 2015
	Colonel	19 March 2010
	Lieutenant Colonel	20 May 2003
	Major	16 December 1998
	Captain	31 May 1993
	First Lieutenant	31 May 1991
	Second Lieutenant	31 May 1989

Military offices
Preceded by Mark E. Bartman	Commander of the 180th Fighter Wing; 2011–2013	Succeeded by Craig R. Baker
Preceded by Michael R. Taheri	Commander of the Air National Guard Readiness Center; 2017–2019	Succeeded by Frank H. Stokes
Preceded by ???	Director of Operations of the National Guard Bureau; 2019–2022	Succeeded by Joseph Jarrard
Preceded by Kirk S. Pierce	Commander of First Air Force; 2023–2024	Succeeded by M. Luke Ahmann
Preceded by Jonathan M. Stubbs; Acting	Chief of the National Guard Bureau; 2024–present	Incumbent
Order of precedence
Preceded by Kenneth S. Wilsbach as Chief of Staff of the Air Force	Order of precedence of the United States as Chief of the National Guard Bureau	Succeeded by Kevin E. Lunday as acting Commandant of the Coast Guard
