= Dawne Deskins =

U.S. Air Force general

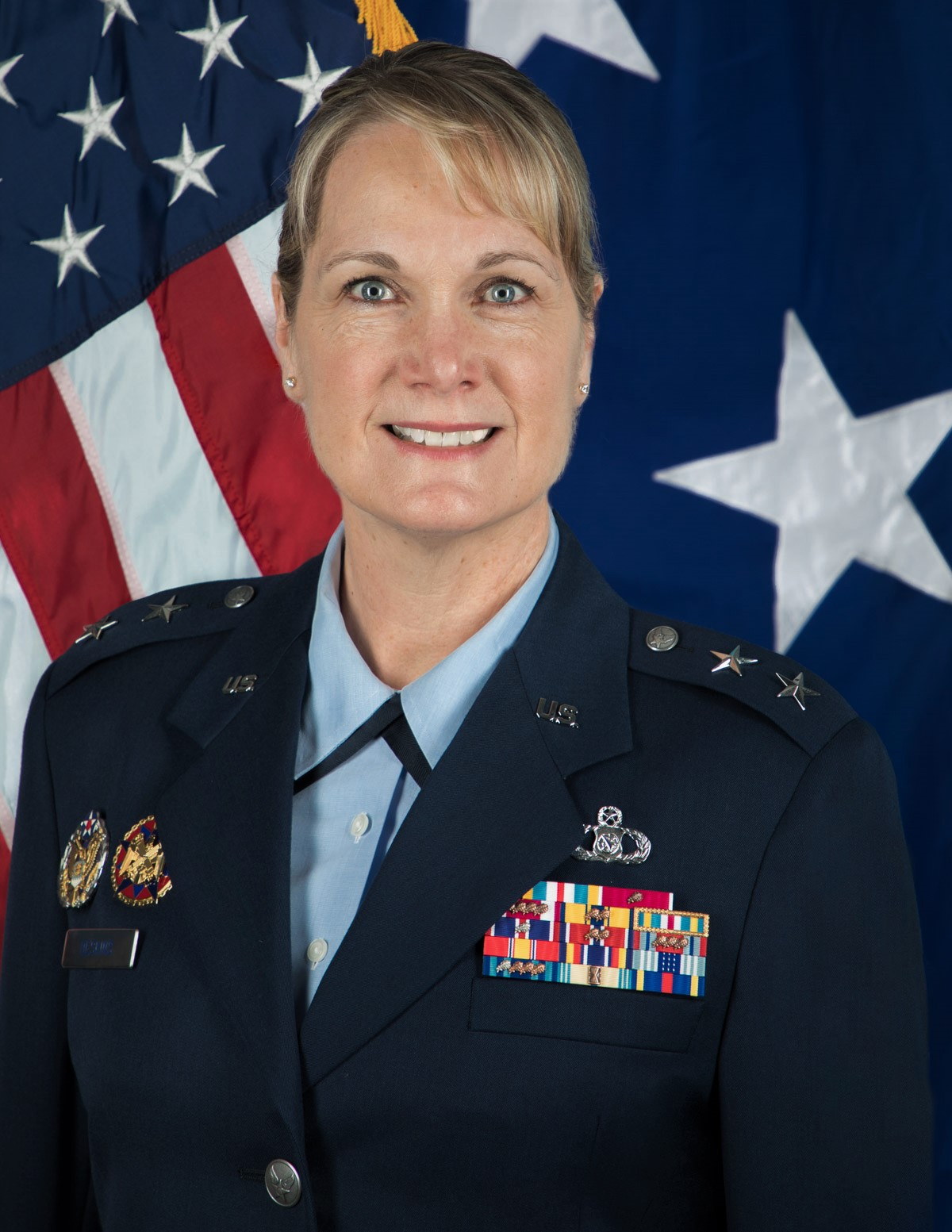
- Official portrait, 2019
- Military career
- Allegiance: United States
- Branch: United States Air Force
- Service years: 1984–2022
- Rank: Major general
- Commands: Eastern Air Defense Sector
- Awards: Defense Superior Service Medal; Legion of Merit (2); Meritorious Service Medal (5)

Dawne L. Deskins is a retired United States Air Force major general who last served as the deputy director of the Air National Guard from July 2020 to February 2021. Previously, she was the director of manpower and personnel of the National Guard Bureau from December 2018 to July 2020. Deskins earned a B.S. degree in communications from Ithaca College in 1984. She later received an M.S. degree in management from Florida State University in 1992.

Her retirement ceremony occurred on February 25, 2022.

== In popular culture ==
She has been portrayed by Karen Kirkpatrick in the 2006 film United 93. Major Dawne Deskins in NEADS, Rome, New York during the September 11 attacks.

Military offices
Preceded by ???	Director of Air, Space and Cyber Operations of the Air National Guard Readiness Center; 2014–2016	Succeeded by ???
Preceded by ???	Deputy Director of for Partnering, Security Cooperation, and Missile Defense of the United States; 2016–2018	Succeeded by Jessica Meyeraan
Preceded by Jeffrey B. Cashman	Director of Manpower and Personnel of the National Guard Bureau; 2018–2020	Succeeded by Eric K. Little
Preceded by Marc H. Sasseville	Deputy Director of the Air National Guard; 2020–2021	Succeeded by Duke Pirak
