= Michael Gerock =

U.S. Air Force general

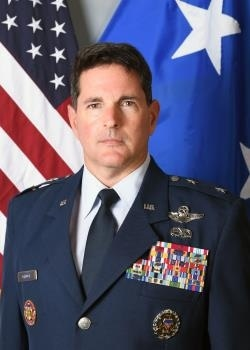
- Military career
- Allegiance: United States
- Branch: United States Air Force
- Service years: 1994–2022
- Rank: Major General
- Commands: Air National Guard Readiness Center; 145 Airlift Wing; 385th Airlift Expeditionary Group; 145th Aircraft Maintenance Squadron
- Awards: Defense Superior Service Medal; Legion of Merit (2)

Michael Troy Gerock is a retired United States Air Force major general who served as the Commander of the Air National Guard Readiness Center from 2020 to 2022. Previously, he was the Director of the Senior Leader Management Office.

Military offices
Preceded by Marshall C. Collins	Commander of the 145 Airlift Wing; 2016–2018	Succeeded by Bryony Terrell
Preceded by ???	Director of the Senior Leader Management Office; 2018–2020	Succeeded by ???
Preceded by Frank H. Stokes	Commander of the Air National Guard Readiness Center; 2020–2022	Succeeded by Keith G. MacDonald
