= General Pierce =

General Pierce may refer to:

- Clinton A. Pierce (1894–1966), U.S. Army brigadier general
- Franklin Pierce (1804–1869), New Hampshire Militia brigadier general and later President of the United States
- Harold E. Pierce (1922–2006), U.S. Air Force brigadier general
- John L. Pierce (1895–1959), U.S. Army brigadier general
- Kirk S. Pierce (fl. 1980s–2020s), U.S. Air Force lieutenant general
- Palmer E. Pierce (1865–1940), U.S. Army brigadier general

== See also ==
- William S. Peirce (general) (1864–1923), U.S. Army brigadier general
- General Pearce (disambiguation)
