= Vice Chief of the National Guard Bureau =

Second highest-ranking officer of the United States National Guard

- Seal of the National Guard Bureau

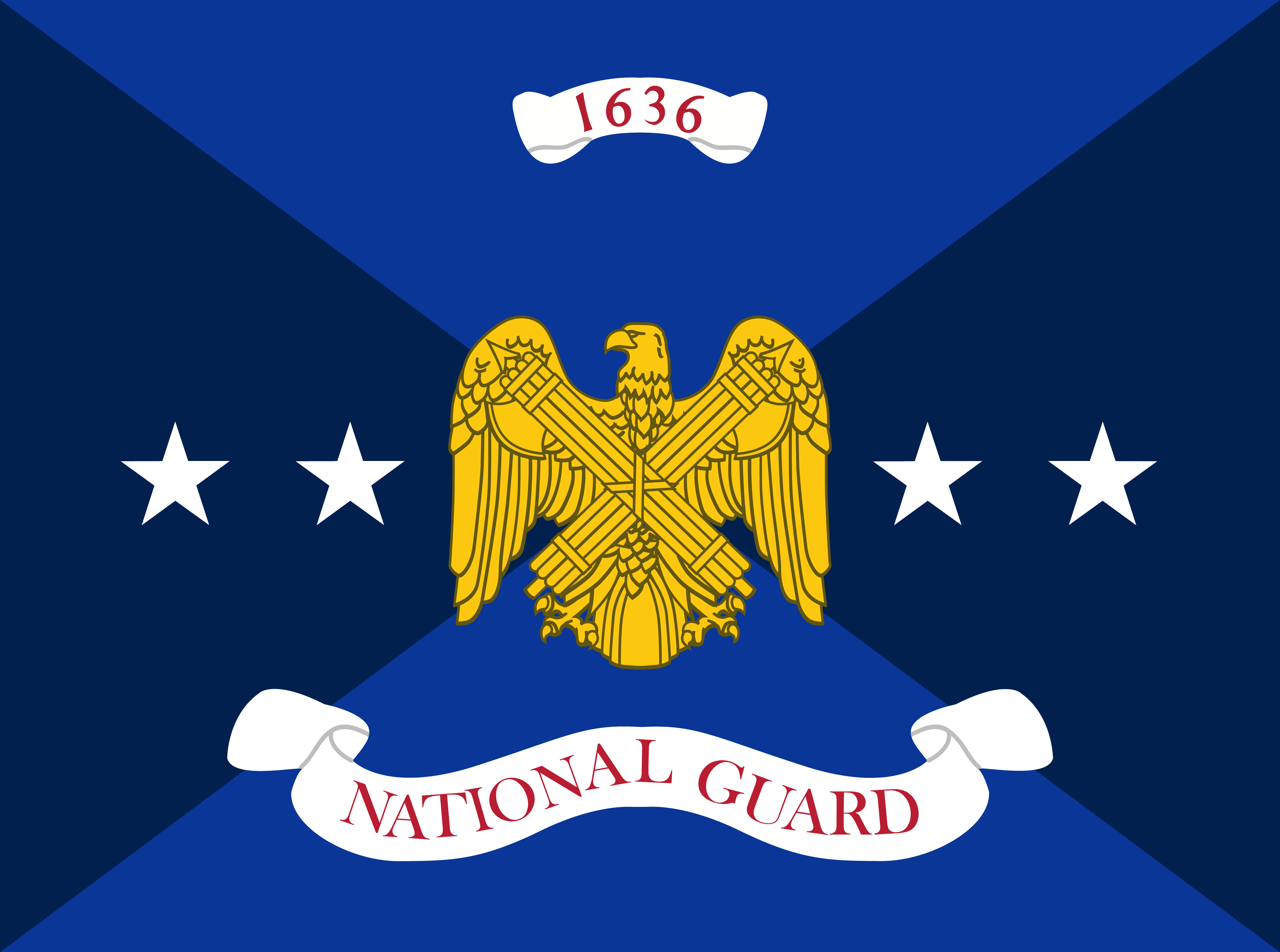
- Flag of the Vice Chief

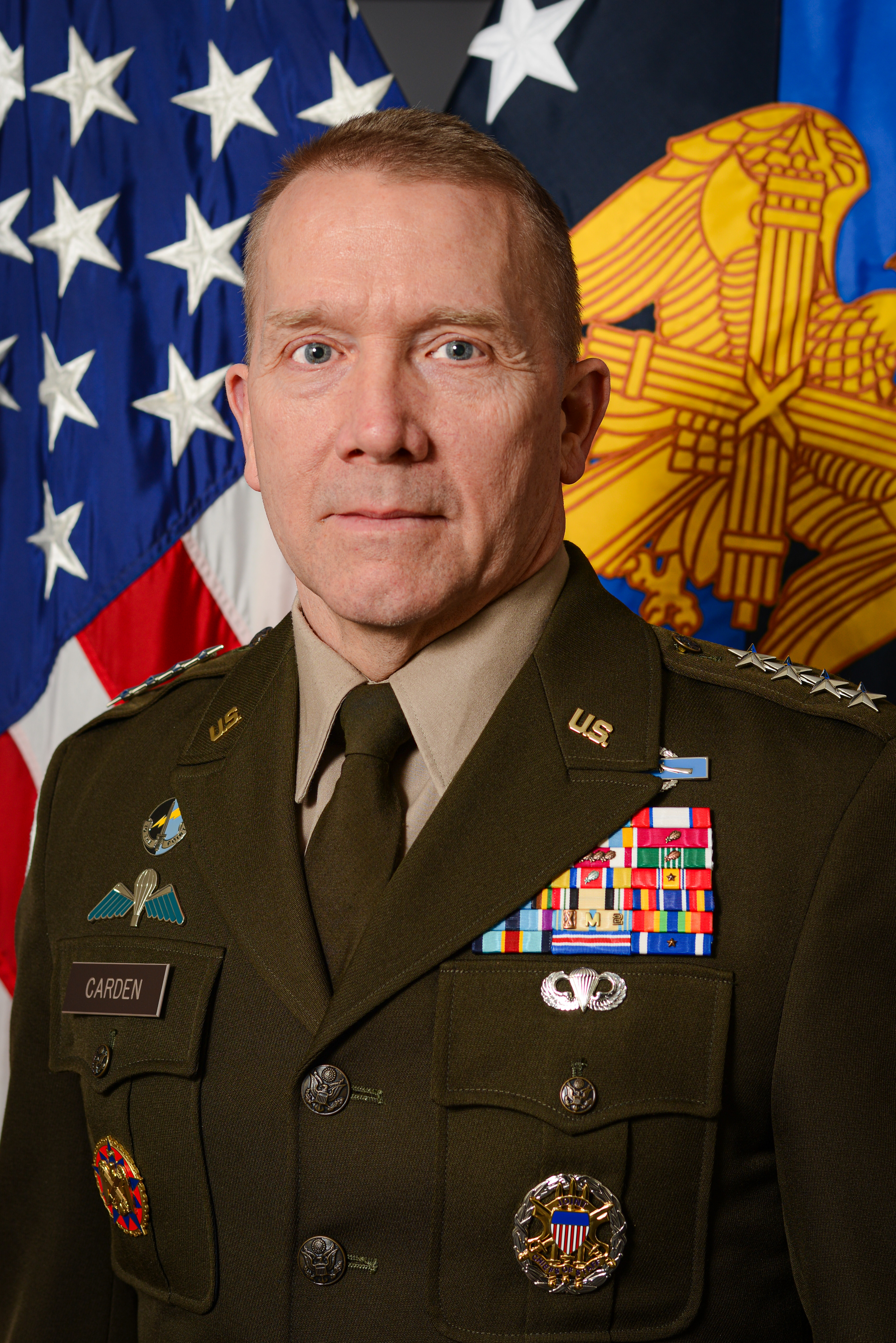
- Incumbent; General Thomas M. Carden Jr., USA since 2 February 2026
- National Guard Bureau
- Abbreviation: VCNGB
- Member of: United States National Guard; Joint Requirements Oversight Council
- Reports to: Chief of the National Guard Bureau
- Nominator: President
- Appointer: Senate
- Term length: 4 years, renewable
- Constituting instrument: 10 U.S.C. § 10505
- Formation: 5 October 1994
- Website: Official Website

The vice chief of the National Guard Bureau (VCNGB) is the second highest-ranking officer of the National Guard Bureau, which is a joint activity of the United States Department of Defense. The vice chief is also the second in charge of the National Guard; which is a joint reserve component of the United States Army and the United States Air Force. The vice chief serves as the principal advisor to the chief of the National Guard Bureau and the secretary of defense, through the chairman of the Joint Chiefs of Staff, on matters involving non-federalized National Guard forces and on other matters as determined by the secretary of defense. The vice chief also serves as the principal adviser to the secretary of the Army, the secretary of the Air Force, the chief of staff of the Army, and the chief of staff of the Air Force, on matters relating to federalized forces of the United States National Guard and its sub-components; the Army National Guard, and the Air National Guard.

The vice chief position is a statutory office (10 U.S.C. § 10505) and is nominated for appointment by the president from any eligible National Guard officer holding the rank of major general or above, who has also served at least 10 years of federally recognized active duty in the National Guard. The nominee must have been recommended by their state governor and their service secretary, and must also meet the additional requirements for the position, as determined by the secretary of defense and the chairman of the Joint Chiefs of Staff. The nominee must be confirmed via majority vote from the Senate. The vice chief serves a four-year term of office at the pleasure of the president. By statute, the vice chief serves as a reserve officer on active duty in the Army or the Air Force. The chief and vice chief cannot be from the same service. If an officer from the same service as the sitting vice chief is appointed to be the chief of the National Guard Bureau, the vice chief's term involuntarily ends when the new chief assumes office.

The position of vice chief was established via the 1995 National Defense Authorization Act as a two-star office. The 2005 National Defense Authorization Act renamed the position to director of the Joint Staff of the National Guard Bureau. The 2012 National Defense Authorization Act renamed the position back to vice chief of the National Guard Bureau, and elevated the office to a three-star general. While the 2017 National Defense Authorization Act removed the vice chief's statutory rank, the 2024 National Defense Authorization Act amended that and elevated the vice chief to a statutory rank of general.

== List of vice chiefs ==
No.	Vice Chief		Term			Service branch
No.	Portrait	Name	Took office	Left office	Term length	Service branch
Vice Chief of the National Guard Bureau (1988–2004)
1	John B. Conaway	Major General; John B. Conaway (born 1934)	July 1988	February 1990	~1 year, 215 days	U.S. Air Force
2	William A. Navas Jr.	Major General; William A. Navas Jr. (born 1942)	July 1990	August 1992	~2 years, 31 days	U.S. Army
3	Raymond F. Rees	Major General; Raymond F. Rees (born 1944)	September 1992	July 1994	~1 year, 303 days	U.S. Army
4	Russell C. Davis	Major General; Russell C. Davis (born 1938)	December 1995	August 1998	~2 years, 243 days	U.S. Air Force
5	Raymond F. Rees	Major General; Raymond F. Rees (born 1944)	March 1999	May 2003	~4 years, 61 days	U.S. Army
Director of the Joint Staff of the National Guard Bureau (2004–2011)
6	Paul J. Sullivan	Major General; Paul J. Sullivan	November 2003	1 May 2005	~1 year, 181 days	U.S. Air Force
–	Ronald G. Young	Major General; Ronald G. Young; Acting	1 May 2005	8 January 2006	221 days	U.S. Army
7	Terry L. Scherling	Major General; Terry L. Scherling	8 January 2006	January 2008	~1 year, 358 days	U.S. Air Force
8	William H. Etter	Major General; William H. Etter	January 2008	January 2009	~1 year, 0 days	U.S. Air Force
–	Peter M. Aylward	Major General; Peter M. Aylward; Acting	January 2009	August 2009	~212 days	U.S. Army
–	Randy E. Manner	Major General; Randy E. Manner; Acting	December 2010	March 2011	~90 days	U.S. Army
9	Randy E. Manner	Major General; Randy E. Manner	March 2011	31 December 2011	~305 days	U.S. Army
Vice Chief of the National Guard Bureau (2011–present)
–	Randy E. Manner	Major General; Randy E. Manner; Acting	31 December 2011	18 August 2012	231 days	U.S. Army
10	Joseph L. Lengyel	Lieutenant General; Joseph L. Lengyel (born 1959)	18 August 2012	3 August 2016	3 years, 351 days	U.S. Air Force
11	Daniel R. Hokanson	Lieutenant General; Daniel R. Hokanson (born 1963)	November 2016	24 June 2019	~2 years, 235 days	U.S. Army
12	Marc H. Sasseville	Lieutenant General; Marc H. Sasseville (born 1963)	August 2020	29 May 2024	~3 years, 302 days	U.S. Air Force
–	Jon A. Jensen	Lieutenant General; Jon A. Jensen (born 1963); Acting	29 May 2024	5 August 2024	68 days	U.S. Army
–	M. Luke Ahmann	Major General; M. Luke Ahmann; Acting	5 August 2024	2 October 2024	58 days	U.S. Air Force
–	Jonathan Stubbs	Lieutenant General; Jonathan Stubbs (born 1972); Acting	2 October 2024	November 2024	~30 days	U.S. Army
–	Timothy L. Rieger	Major General; Timothy L. Rieger; Acting	November 2024	1 February 2026	~1 year, 92 days	U.S. Army
13	Thomas M. Carden Jr.	General; Thomas M. Carden Jr.	2 February 2026	Incumbent	~231 days	U.S. Army

== See also ==
- Chief of the National Guard Bureau
- Senior Enlisted Advisor for the National Guard Bureau
