= Duke Pirak =

U.S. Air Force general officer

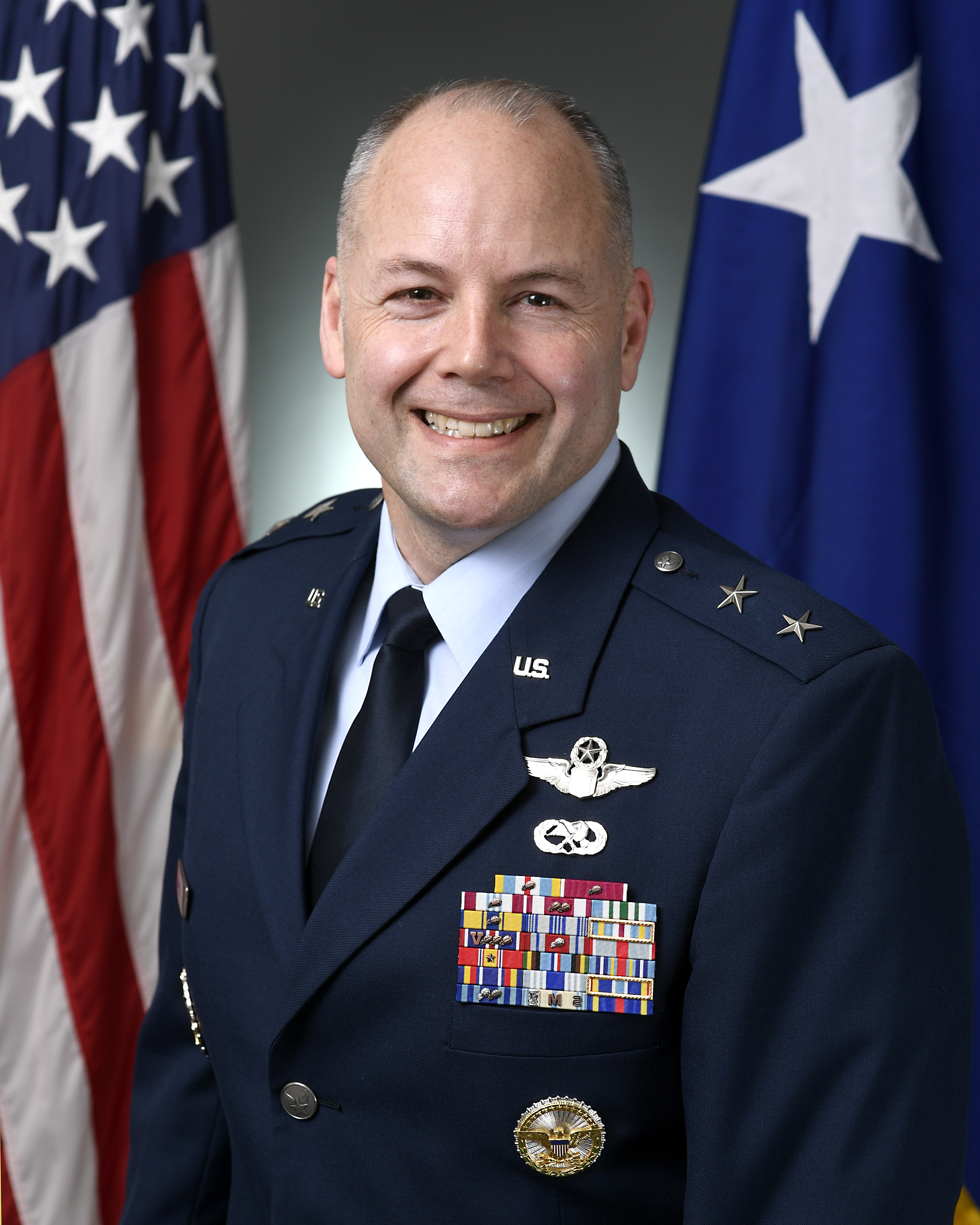
- Born: c. 1972 (age 53–54)
- Military career
- Allegiance: United States
- Branch: United States Air Force; Air National Guard
- Service years: 1991–present
- Rank: Major General
- Commands: 142nd Fighter Wing; 154th Operations Group; 142nd Maintenance Squadron
- Awards: Defense Superior Service Medal (3); Legion of Merit (2)

Duke A. Pirak (born c. 1972) was a United States Air Force major general who served as the deputy director and acting director of the Air National Guard. He retired in 2026. He previously served as the deputy director for politico-military affairs (Asia) of the Joint Staff.

In March 2024, Pirak was nominated for promotion to lieutenant general and appointment as director of the Air National Guard. His nomination has been placed on hold, due to concerns over possible Air National Guard staffing changes, in regards to full-time positions being converted to lower-paying jobs in Alaska. In January 2025, the Senate returned Pirak's nomination to the president without action, but he continued to serve as acting director. By December 2025, the Trump administration decided not to renominate Pirak as director, and instead nominated Texas adjutant general, Major General Thomas M. Suelzer for the position.

Military offices
Preceded by Bradley Swanson	Deputy Director for Strategy, Plans, and Policy of the United States Central Command; 2019–2021	Succeeded by M. Luke Ahmann
Preceded by ???	Deputy Director for Politico-Military Affairs (Asia) of the Joint Staff; 2021–2022	Succeeded by Patrick J. Hannifin
Preceded by Dawne Deskins	Deputy Director of the Air National Guard; 2022–present	Incumbent
Preceded by Michael A. Loh	Director of the Air National Guard; Acting; 2024–present	Incumbent
