= Jonathan Stubbs =

U.S. Army general officer

Jonathan M. Stubbs
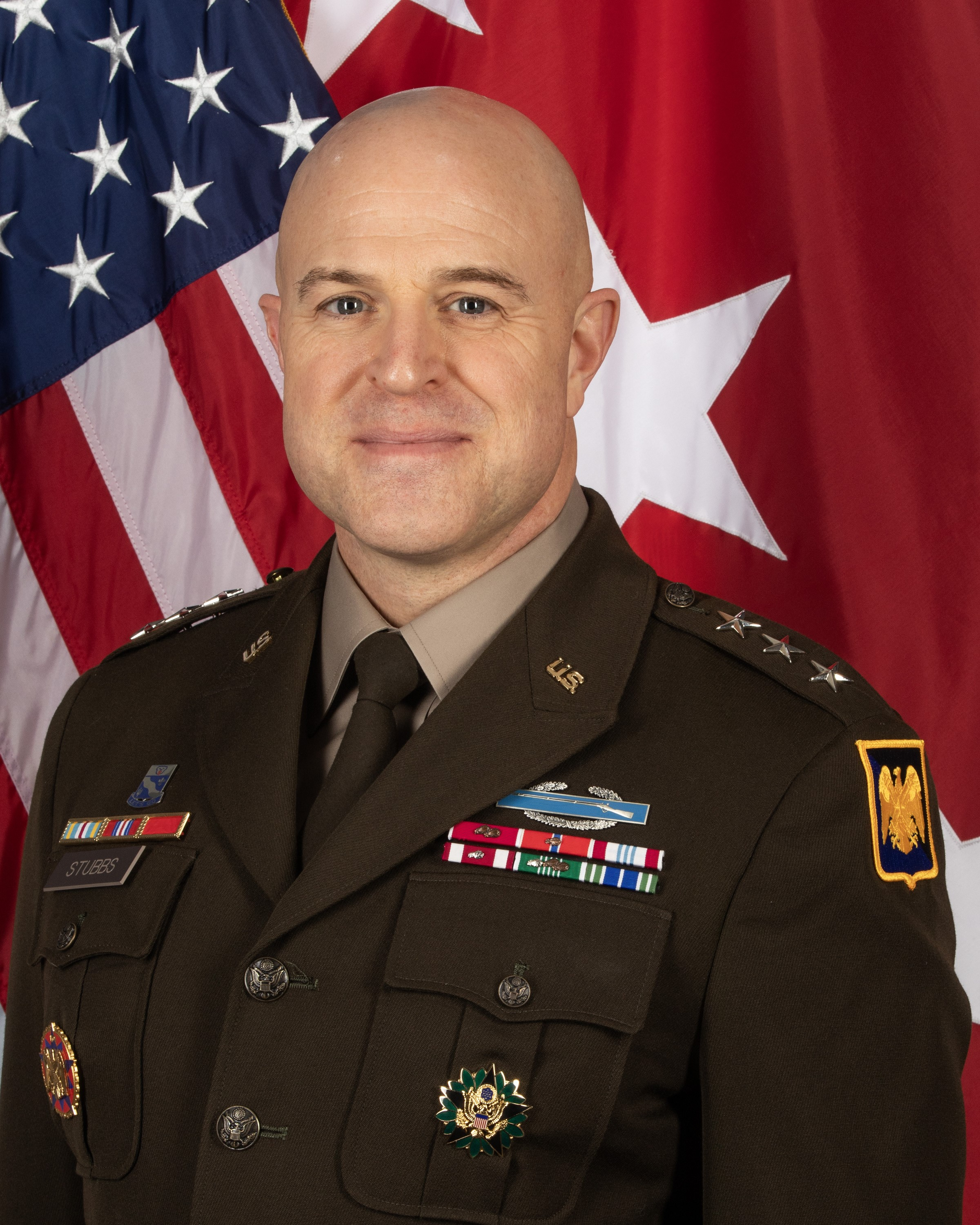
- Official portrait, 2024
- Born: April 8, 1972 (age 54); Memphis, Tennessee, U.S.
- Military career
- Allegiance: United States
- Branch: United States Army; Army National Guard
- Service years: 1993–present
- Rank: Lieutenant General
- Commands: Army National Guard; Arkansas National Guard; 39th Infantry Brigade Combat Team; 2nd Battalion, 153rd Infantry Regiment
- Awards: Legion of Merit (3); Bronze Star Medal (2)

Jonathan M. Stubbs (born April 8, 1972) is a United States Army lieutenant general who has served as the 23rd director of the Army National Guard since 5 August 2024. He served as the acting vice chief of the National Guard Bureau from October to November 2024, as the acting chief of the National Guard Bureau from August to October 2024, and as the 54th adjutant general of Arkansas from 2023 to 2024. He previously served as the deputy director for operations, readiness, and mobilization of the United States Army.

In July 2024, Stubbs was nominated for promotion to lieutenant general and appointment as director of the Army National Guard.

Military offices
Preceded by ???	Vice Director for Operations of the National Guard Bureau; 2021–2022	Succeeded by Teri D. Williams
Preceded by ???	Deputy Director for Operations, Readiness, and Mobilization of the United States Army; 2022–2023	Succeeded by Jonathan P. Beddall
Preceded by Kendall W. Penn	Adjutant General of Arkansas; 2023–2024	Succeeded by O. Chad Bridges
Preceded by Daniel R. Hokanson	Chief of the National Guard Bureau; Acting; 2024	Succeeded by Steven Nordhaus
Preceded by M. Luke Ahmann; Acting	Vice Chief of the National Guard Bureau; Acting; 2024	Succeeded by Timothy L. Rieger; Acting
Preceded by Jon A. Jensen	Director of the Army National Guard; 2024–present	Incumbent
