= General Pearce =

General Pearce may refer to:

- Cheryl Pearce (fl. 1980s–2020s), Australian Army major general
- Les Pearce (general) (1918–2002), New Zealand Army major general
- Nicholas Bartlett Pearce (1828–1894), Arkansas State Troops brigadier general in the American Civil War
- Thomas Pearce (British Army officer) (c. 1670–1739), General of his Majesty's Forces in Ireland

== See also ==
- General Pierce (disambiguation)
