= M. Luke Ahmann =

U.S. Air Force general officer

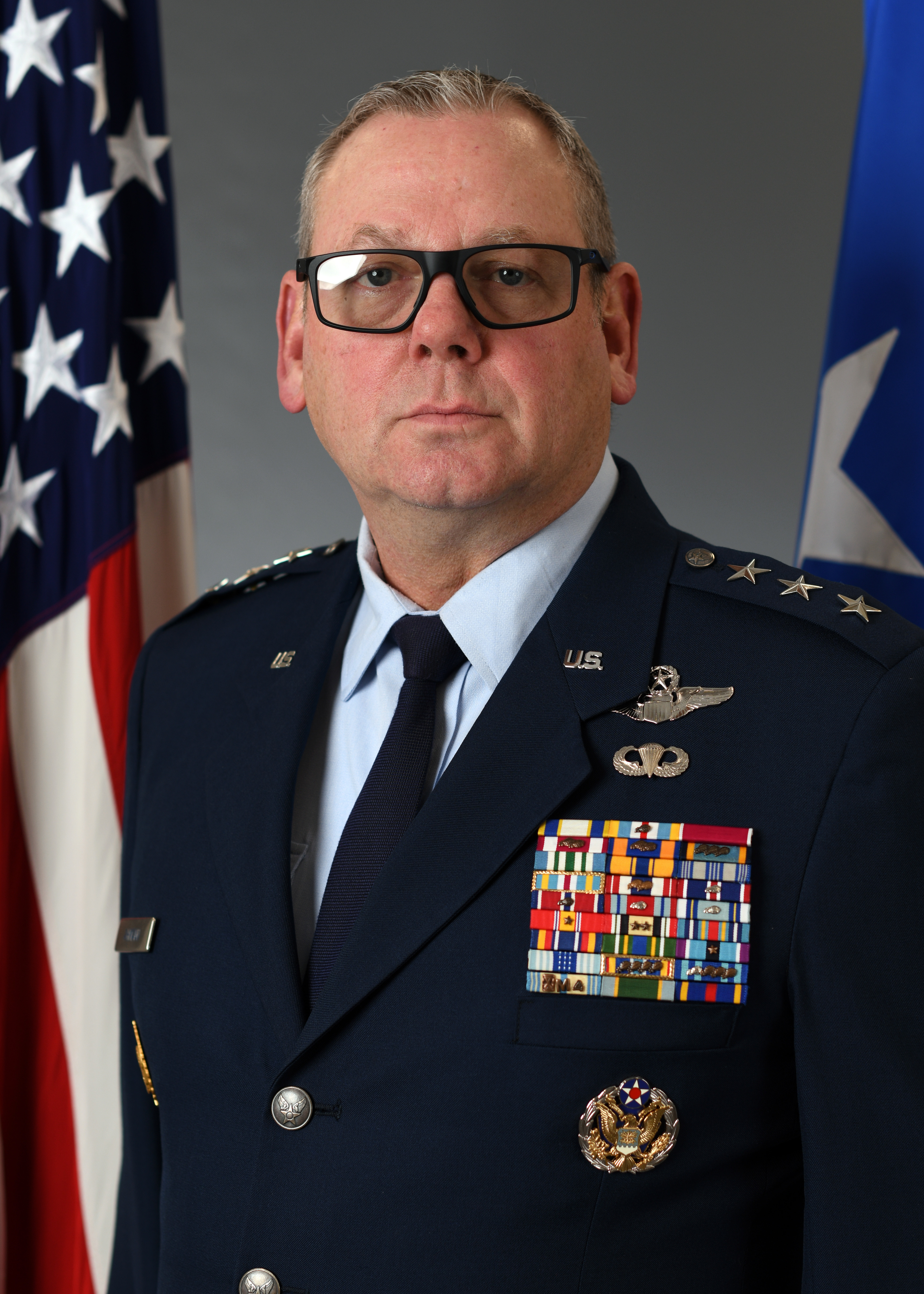
- Official portrait, 2026
- Born: c. 1971 (age 54–55)
- Relatives: James H. Ahmann (father)
- Military career
- Allegiance: United States
- Branch: United States Air Force
- Service years: 1993–present
- Rank: Lieutenant General
- Commands: First Air Force; 158th Maintenance Group; 134th Fighter Squadron
- Awards: Defense Superior Service Medal; Legion of Merit

Michael Lucas Ahmann (born c. 1971) is a United States Air Force lieutenant general who has served as the commander of First Air Force since 2 October 2024. He most recently served as the acting vice chief of the National Guard Bureau from August to October 2024, and as the director of programs and requirements of the National Guard Bureau from 2023 to 2024. He previously served as the deputy director for capability development of the Air Force.

In July 2024, Ahmann was nominated for promotion to lieutenant general and assignment as commander of the Continental NORAD Region and First Air Force.

== Personal life ==
He is the son of Air Force Lieutenant General James H. Ahmann.

Military offices
Preceded by Duke Pirak	Deputy Director for Strategy, Plans, and Policy of the United States Central Command; 2021–2022	Succeeded by ???
Preceded by ???	Deputy Director for Capability Development of the United States Air Force; 2023	Succeeded by Jason L. Hawk
Preceded by ???	Director of Programs and Requirements of the National Guard Bureau; 2023–present	Vacant
Preceded by Jon A. Jensen; Acting	Vice Chief of the National Guard Bureau; Acting; 2024	Succeeded by Jonathan Stubbs; Acting
Preceded by Steven Nordhaus	Commander of First Air Force; 2024–present	Incumbent
