= Daniel R. Hokanson =

US Army general (born 1963)

Daniel Hokanson
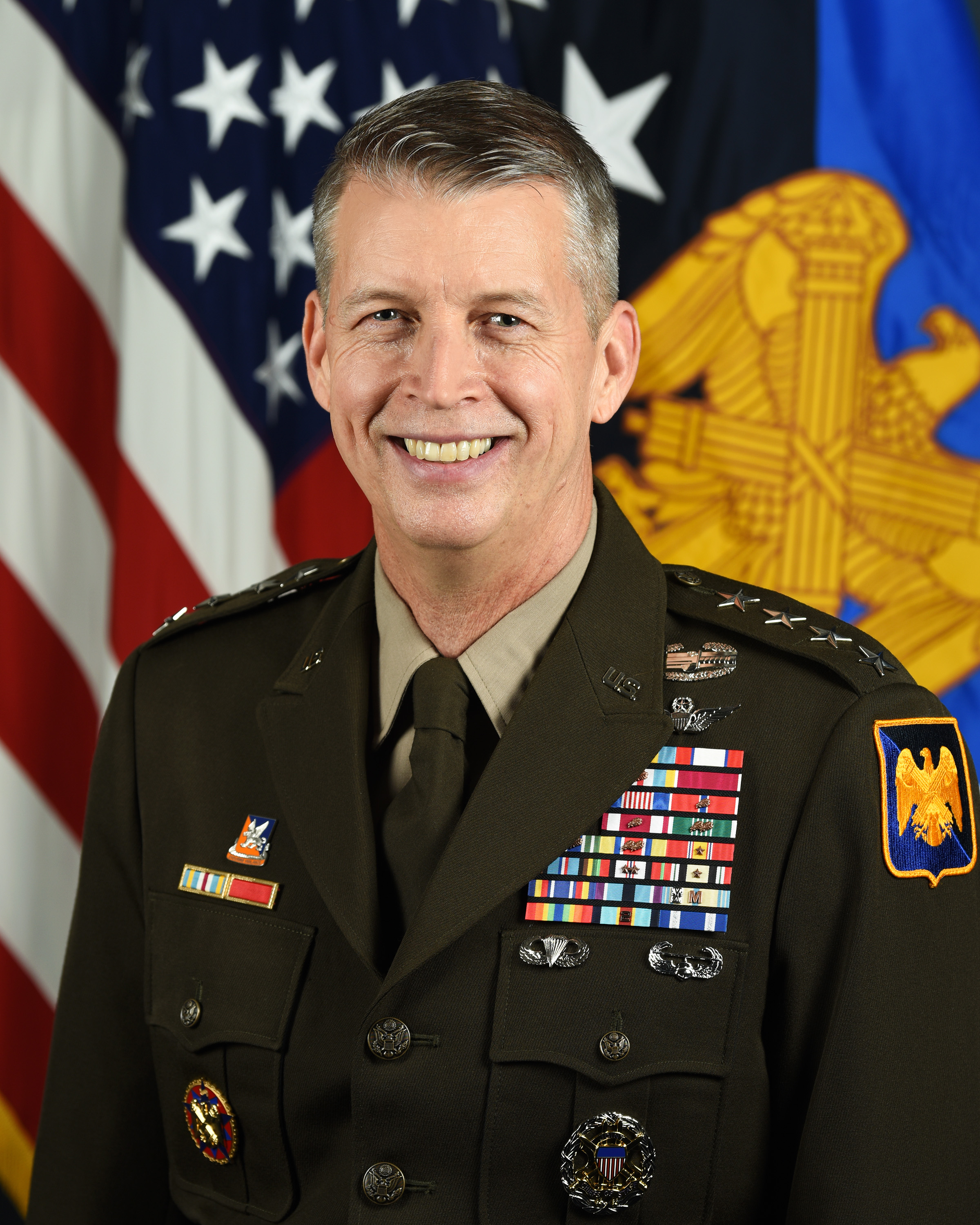
- Born: 27 June 1963 (age 63); Happy Camp, California, U.S.
- Allegiance: United States
- Branch: United States Army
- Service years: 1986–2024
- Rank: General
- Commands: Chief of the National Guard Bureau; Oregon National Guard; 41st Infantry Brigade Combat Team; 641st Medical Battalion (Evacuation Helicopter)
- Conflicts: Operation Just Cause; Iraq War; War in Afghanistan
- Awards: Defense Distinguished Service Medal (3); Army Distinguished Service Medal (2); Defense Superior Service Medal (2); Legion of Merit; Soldier's Medal; Bronze Star (2)
- Education: United States Military Academy (BS); Naval Postgraduate School (MA); Naval War College (MA)
- Spouse: Kelly Triplett
- Children: 3
- Daniel R. Hokanson's voice Hokanson's opening remarks at a DOD press conference on National Guard priorities Recorded 24 January 2023

Daniel Robert Hokanson (born 27 June 1963) is a retired United States Army general who last served as the 29th chief of the National Guard Bureau. He previously served as the 21st director of the Army National Guard. His previous military assignments include serving as vice chief of the National Guard Bureau, deputy commander of United States Northern Command, adjutant general of the Oregon National Guard, and commander of the 41st Infantry Brigade Combat Team. He is a veteran of Operation Iraqi Freedom, Operation Enduring Freedom, and Operation Just Cause.

== Early life ==
Daniel Robert Hokanson was born in Happy Camp, California on 27 June 1963, the son of Bob and Diann (Kieffer) Hokanson. He graduated from Happy Camp High School in 1980, and attended the College of the Siskiyous before being accepted to the United States Military Academy at West Point, New York.

== Military career ==
Hokanson graduated from West Point in 1986 and was commissioned as a second lieutenant on 28 May, in the Aviation branch. During his time at West Point and the period immediately afterwards he completed: Level C Survival, Evasion, Resistance and Escape (SERE) Course; Aviation Officer Basic Course; Air Assault School; and Initial Entry Rotary Wing Flight Training (Aeroscout). He is also a graduate of the United States Army Airborne School.

Hokanson then served for several years as an aviator with the 7th Infantry Division at Fort Ord, California, including deployment to Panama for Operation Just Cause in 1989–90. In 1991 he completed the Aviation Officer Advanced Course and AH-64 (Apache) Combat Aircraft Qualification Course. He subsequently served with 1st Battalion, 229th Aviation Regiment at Fort Hood, including command of the battalion's Company B, and then served as a project engineer for the Aircraft Armament Test Division at Yuma Proving Ground in Arizona.

=== Army National Guard ===
Hokanson left the Regular Army in July 1995 and was a member of the Army Reserve Control Group until October.

Hokanson then began his career as a member of the Army National Guard, assigned initially as aide-de-camp in the office of Oregon's adjutant general. His later assignments included: operations officer, 641st Medical Battalion (Helicopter Evacuation); aviation operations officer, Oregon Army National Guard; plans analyst, Program Analysis and Evaluation Division, National Guard Bureau; executive officer, 641st Medical Battalion (Evacuation Helicopter), Oregon Army National Guard; deputy director, Army Aviation, Oregon Army National Guard; commander, 641st Medical Battalion (Helicopter Evacuation), Oregon Army National Guard; chief of staff, Combined Joint Task Force Phoenix V, Afghanistan; deputy commander, 41st Infantry Brigade Combat Team, Oregon Army National Guard; and commander, 41st Infantry Brigade Combat Team, including deployment as part of Multi-National Corps – Iraq.

=== General officer ===
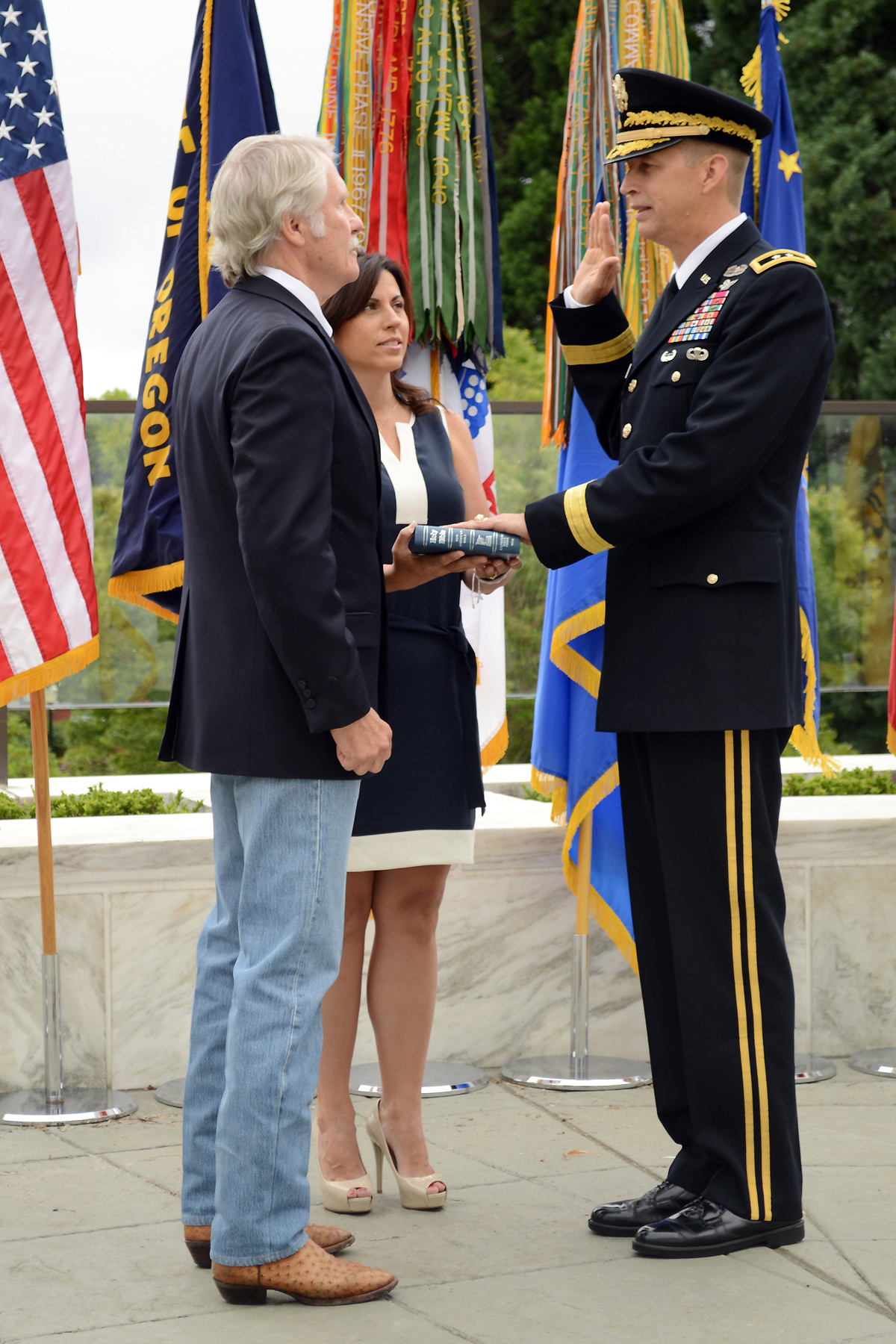
Hokanson being sworn in as adjutant general by Oregon Governor John Kitzhaber

In 2010 Hokanson was promoted to brigadier general. His assignments as a general officer included: deputy director, Strategic Plans and Policy (J-5), North American Aerospace Defense Command and United States Northern Command; and director, Strategic Plans and Policy (J-5), National Guard Bureau. Hokanson was promoted to major general in May 2013. From August 2013 to July 2015 he served as adjutant general of the Oregon Military Department.

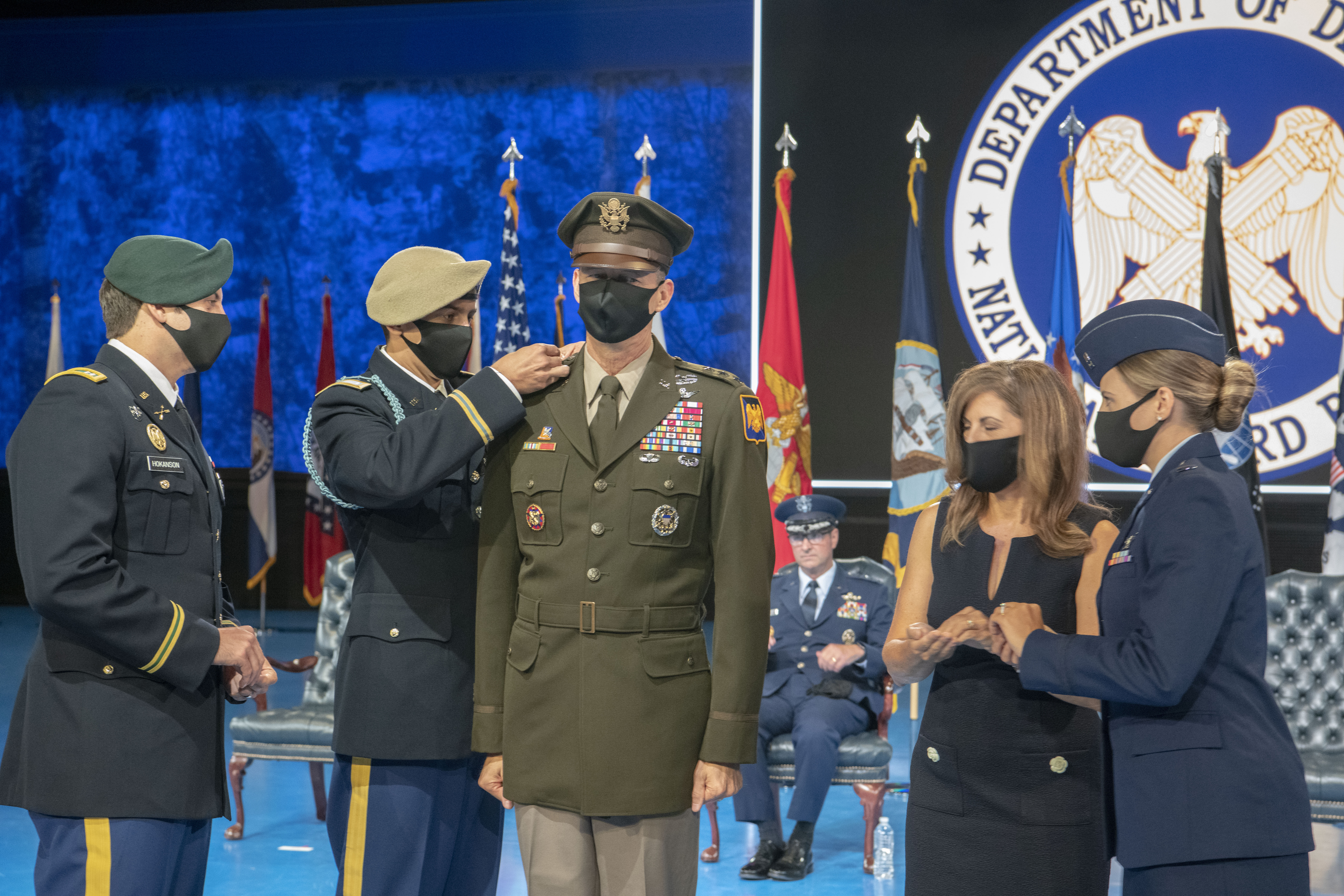
Secretary of Defense Mark Esper presides as Hokanson is promoted to general and takes over as 29th chief of the National Guard Bureau during ceremonies at Joint Base Myer-Henderson Hall, Va., 3 August 2020.

In June 2015, Hokanson was nominated by the president, for appointment to the rank of lieutenant general in the reserve active-duty, while serving as the deputy commander of United States Northern Command and as vice commander of U.S. Element, North American Aerospace Defense Command, at Peterson Air Force Base, Colorado.

Hokanson's nomination for appointment as the 11th vice chief of the National Guard Bureau was confirmed by the United States Senate on 15 September 2016. He assumed office in November 2016.

=== Director of the Army National Guard ===
In March 2019, the president nominated Hokanson to succeed Timothy J. Kadavy as director of the Army National Guard. Hokanson assumed his new duties in a ceremony on 21 June 2019. In June 2020, the adjutant general of Minnesota, Jon A. Jensen was nominated to succeed him as Army Guard director.

=== Chief of the National Guard Bureau ===
In May 2020, Hokanson was nominated for appointment to the rank of general and assignment as chief of the National Guard Bureau. He was confirmed by the Senate on 20 July 2020 and assumed office on 3 August 2020.

== Awards and decorations ==
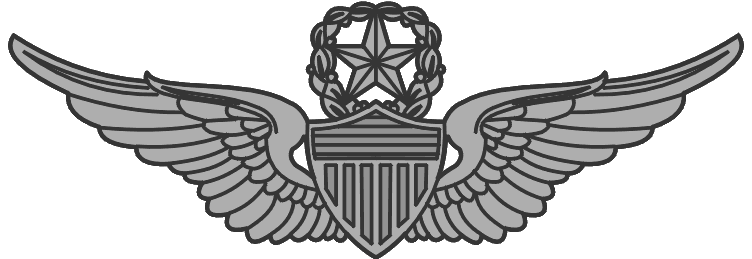
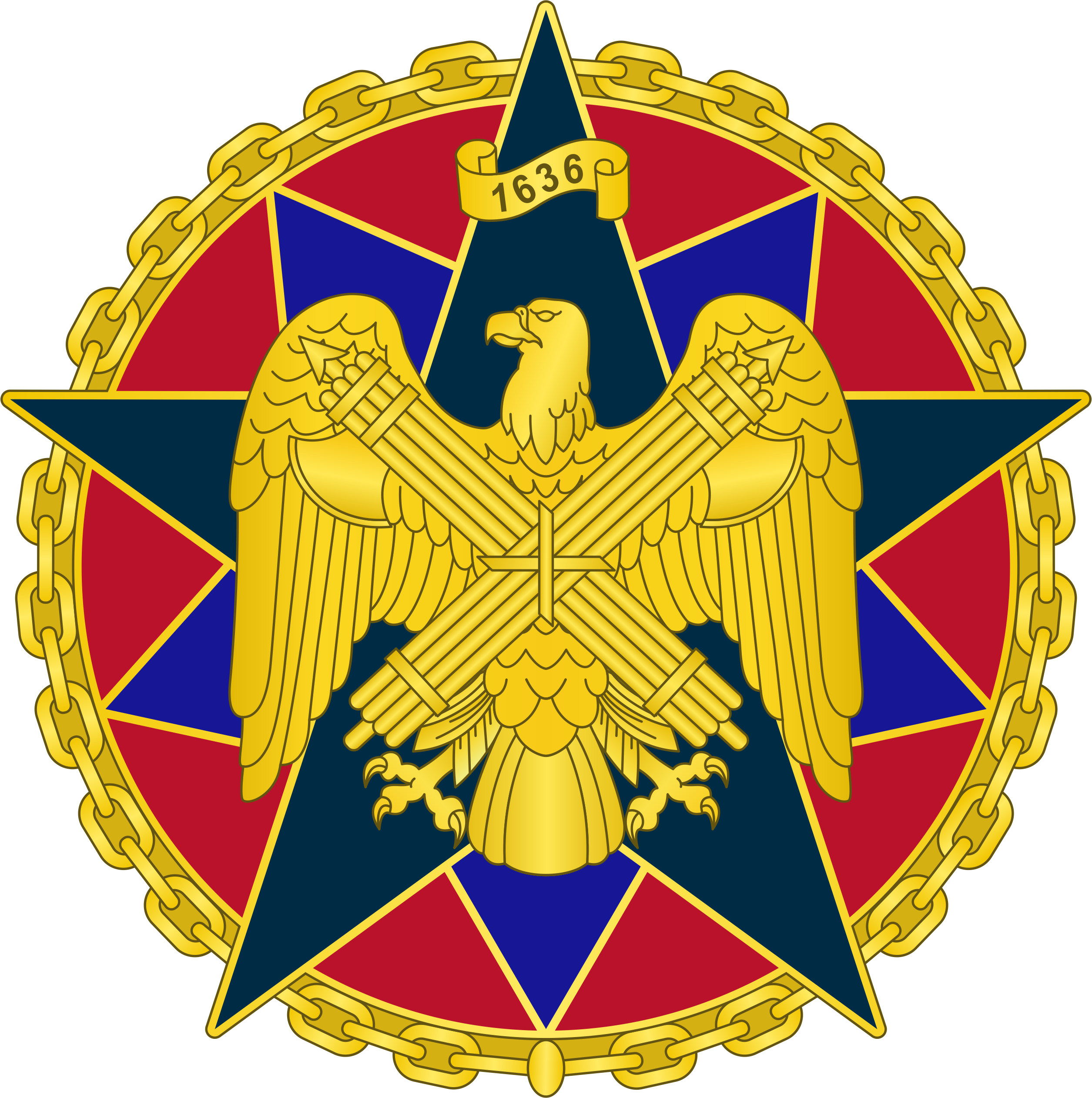
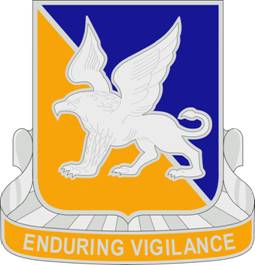
Combat Action Badge
Master Army Aviator Badge
Basic Parachutist Badge
Air Assault Badge
Joint Chiefs of Staff Identification Badge
National Guard Bureau Organizational Badge
41st Infantry Brigade Combat Team Combat Service Identification Badge
641st Aviation Regiment Distinctive Unit Insignia
3 Overseas Service Bars

Defense Distinguished Service Medal with two bronze oak leaf clusters
Army Distinguished Service Medal with oak leaf cluster
Defense Superior Service Medal with oak leaf cluster
Legion of Merit
Soldier's Medal
Bronze Star Medal with oak leaf cluster
Meritorious Service Medal with oak leaf cluster
Army Commendation Medal with two oak leaf clusters
Army Achievement Medal with three oak leaf clusters
Joint Meritorious Unit Award with oak leaf cluster
Army Meritorious Unit Commendation
Army Reserve Component Achievement Medal with two oak leaf clusters
National Defense Service Medal with one bronze service star
Armed Forces Expeditionary Medal
Afghanistan Campaign Medal with two service stars
Iraq Campaign Medal with service star
Global War on Terrorism Service Medal
Humanitarian Service Medal
Armed Forces Reserve Medal with silver Hourglass device and "M" device
Army Service Ribbon
Army Overseas Service Ribbon with bronze award numeral 2
NATO Medal for service with ISAF
Oregon Distinguished Service Medal
Oregon 30 Year Faithful Service Medal

== Assignments ==
1. July 1986 – July 1987, Student, Survival, Evasion, Resistance and Escape (Level C – Fort Bragg); Aviation Officer Basic Course; Air Assault School; Initial Entry Rotary Wing Flight Training (Aeroscout); Fort Rucker, Alabama
2. July 1987 – March 1988, Executive Officer, Troop B, 2nd Squadron (RECON), 9th Cavalry, 7th Infantry Division (LIGHT), Fort Ord, California
3. March 1988 – May 1989, Scout Platoon Leader, Troop B, 2nd Squadron (RECON), 9th Cavalry, 7th Infantry Division (LIGHT), Fort Ord, California and the Republic of Panama
4. May 1989 – August 1990, Flight Operations Officer and 3rd Infantry Brigade Aviation Liaison Officer, 2nd Squadron (RECON), 9th Cavalry, 7th Infantry Division (LIGHT), Fort Ord, California and the Republic of Panama
5. October 1990 – June 1991, Student, Aviation Officer Advanced Course and AH-64 Combat Aircraft Qualification Course, Fort Rucker, Alabama
6. June 1991 – October 1992, Assistant S3, 1st Battalion, 229th Aviation Regiment (Attack), Apache Training Brigade, Fort Hood, Texas
7. October 1992 – June 1994, Commander, Company B, 1st Battalion, 229th Aviation Regiment (Attack), XVIII Airborne Corps, Fort Bragg, North Carolina
8. June 1994 – April 1995 Project Engineer, Aircraft Armament Test Division, Yuma Proving Ground, Arizona
9. July 1995 – October 1995, Army Reserve Control Group (Ready Reserve)
10. October 1995 – September 1996, Aide-de-Camp, Office of The Adjutant General, Oregon National Guard, Salem, Oregon
11. October 1996 – September 1997, Operations Officer, 641st Medical Battalion (EVAC), Oregon Army National Guard, Salem, Oregon
12. October 1997 – December 1998, Aviation Operations Officer, Oregon Army National Guard, Salem, Oregon
13. December 1998 – June 1999, Student, Naval Postgraduate School, Monterey, California
14. July 1999 – July 2000, Plans Analyst, Program Analysis and Evaluation Division, National Guard Bureau, Arlington, Virginia
15. July 2000 – June 2001, Student, College of Naval Command and Staff, Naval War College, Newport, Rhode Island
16. June 2001 – June 2002, Executive Officer, 641st Medical Battalion (EVAC), Oregon Army National Guard, Salem, Oregon
17. June 2002 – June 2004, deputy director, Army Aviation, Headquarters State Area Command, Oregon Army National Guard, Salem, Oregon
18. July 2004 – June 2005, Commander, 641st Medical Battalion (EVAC), Oregon Army National Guard, Salem, Oregon
19. July 2005 – July 2006, Student, Senior Service College Fellowship, Harvard University, Cambridge, Massachusetts
20. August 2006 – July 2007, Chief of Staff, Combined Joint Task Force Phoenix V, Afghanistan
21. July 2007 – March 2008, Deputy Commander, 41st Infantry Brigade Combat Team, Oregon Army National Guard, Portland, Oregon
22. March 2008 – July 2010, Commander, 41st Infantry Brigade Combat Team, Multi-National Corps – Iraq, and Oregon Army National Guard, Portland, Oregon
23. August 2010 – August 2012, deputy director, J5, North American Aerospace Defense Command and United States Northern Command, Peterson Air Force Base, Colorado
24. August 2012 – July 2013, Director, Strategic Plans and Policy (J-5), National Guard Bureau, Arlington, Virginia
25. August 2013 – July 2015, The Adjutant General, Oregon, Joint Force Headquarters, Oregon National Guard, Salem, Oregon
26. August 2015 – September 2016, Deputy Commander, U.S. Northern Command, Peterson Air Force Base, Colorado
27. September 2016 – June 2019, Vice Chief of the National Guard Bureau, Arlington, Virginia
28. June 2019 – August 2020, Director of the Army National Guard, Arlington, Virginia
29. August 2020 – August 2024, Chief, National Guard Bureau, the Pentagon, Arlington, Virginia

== Education ==
Hokanson is a 1986 graduate of the United States Military Academy, and received a Bachelor of Science degree in mechanical engineering (aerospace).

In 2000 he completed a Master of Arts in international security and civil-military relations at the Naval Postgraduate School. In 2001 he graduated from the Naval War College with a Master of Arts in national security and strategic studies. Hokanson completed the Senior Service College National Security Fellowship Program at Harvard University's John F. Kennedy School of Government in 2006. In 2011 he completed the CAPSTONE leadership course at the National Defense University.

== Aviation qualifications ==
In addition to completion of the Aviation Officer Basic and Advanced Courses and Initial Entry Rotary Wing Flight Training (Aeroscout), Hokanson's aviation qualifications include:

- Rating: Command Pilot
- Flight Hours: More than 2600 (over 50 combat hours)
- Aircraft Flown: AH-64, OH-58, TH-55, UH-1, UH-60
- Pilot wings from: Fort Rucker, Alabama

== Effective dates of promotion ==
Promotions
Insignia	Rank	Date
	General	3 August 2020
	Lieutenant General	15 August 2015
	Major General	23 May 2013
	Brigadier General	22 December 2010
	Colonel	2 August 2006
	Lieutenant Colonel	24 July 2002
	Major	30 October 1997
	Captain	1 November 1990
	First Lieutenant	28 November 1987
	Second Lieutenant	28 May 1986

== Family life ==
Hokanson and his wife Kelly have three children. All three Hokanson children pursued careers in the military.

Military offices
Preceded by Raymond F. Rees	Adjutant General of the Oregon Military Department; 2013–2015	Succeeded by Michael E. Stencel
Preceded by Michael Dubie	Deputy Commander of the United States Northern Command; 2015–2016	Succeeded by Reynold N. Hoover
Preceded by Joseph L. Lengyel	Vice Chief of the National Guard Bureau; 2016–2019	Succeeded by Marc H. Sasseville
Preceded by Charles Whittington; Acting	Director of the Army National Guard; 2019–2020	Succeeded by Jon A. Jensen
Preceded by Joseph L. Lengyel	Chief of the National Guard Bureau; 2020–2024	Succeeded by Jonathan Stubbs; Acting
