= Jon A. Jensen =

United States Army general

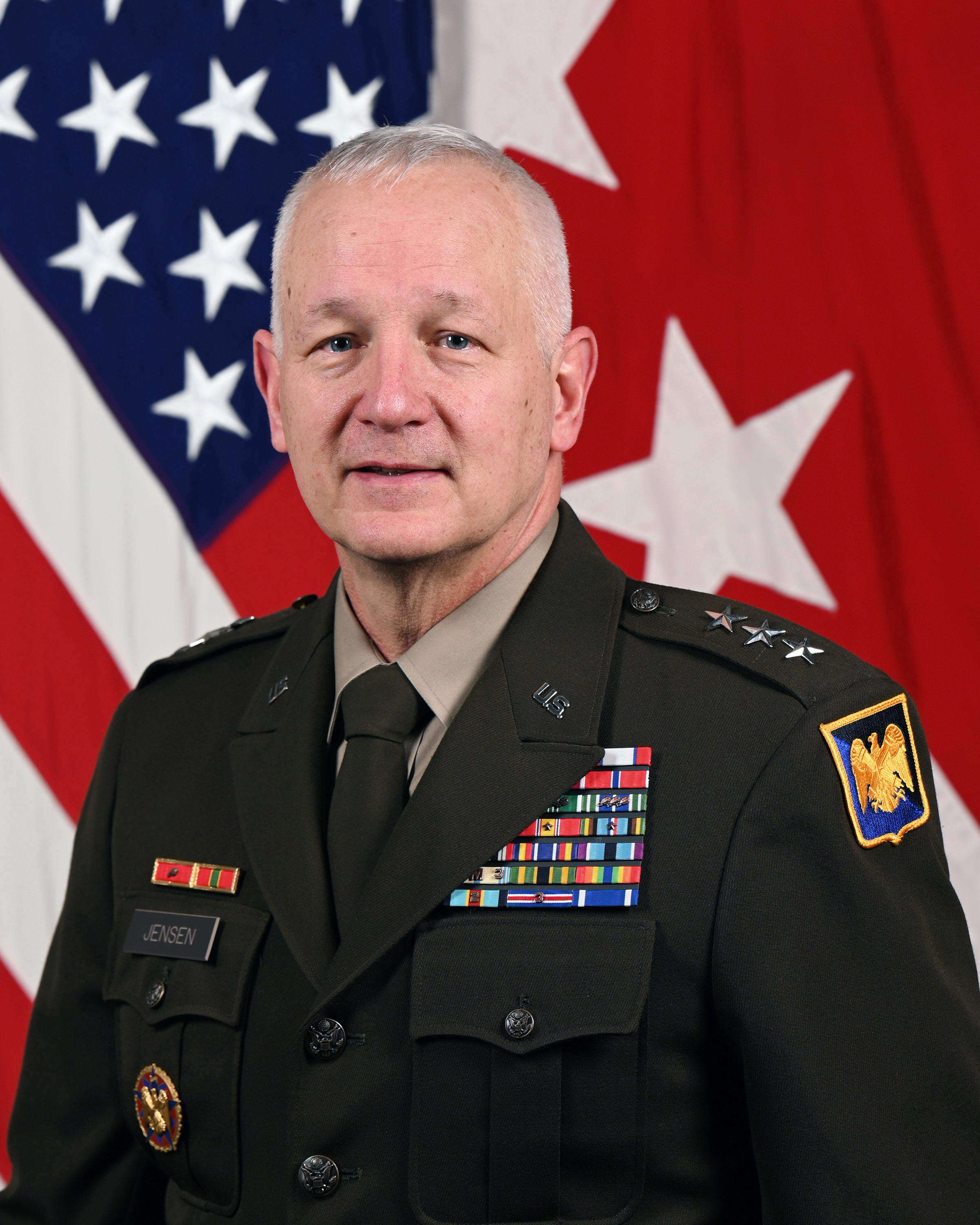
- Official portrait, 2022
- Born: 1963 (age 62–63); Council Bluffs, Iowa, U.S.
- Alma mater: Northwest Missouri State University (BS, 1986)
- Spouse: Cindy A. Schmid (m. 1992)
- Children: 3
- Military career
- Allegiance: United States
- Branch: United States Army; Army National Guard
- Rank: Lieutenant General
- Commands: Army National Guard; Minnesota National Guard; 34th Infantry Division; 1st Armored Brigade Combat Team, 34th Infantry Division; 2nd Battalion, 135th Infantry
- Conflicts: Operation Desert Spring; Operation Joint Forge; Iraq War
- Awards: Army Distinguished Service Medal; Legion of Merit (2); Bronze Star Medal

Jon A. Jensen (born 1963) is a retired lieutenant general in the United States Army. He served as the 22nd director of the Army National Guard from 2020 to 2024, and as the acting vice chief of the National Guard Bureau from May to August 2024. He previously served as the Adjutant General of Minnesota from November 2017 to August 2020. Prior to that, he was assigned as commanding general of the 34th Infantry Division from January 2017 to October 2017 and as deputy commanding general for United States Army Africa from 2015 to 2017.

LTG Jensen retired on August 5, 2024.

== Education ==
Jensen attended Lewis Central High School in Council Bluffs, Iowa, graduating in 1982. He is a 1986 graduate of Northwest Missouri State University. Jensen later earned master's degrees from the United States Army Command and General Staff College in Fort Leavenworth, Kansas and the United States Army War College in Carlisle, Pennsylvania.

== Military career ==
Jensen enlisted into the Iowa Army National Guard as a Private (PV1) combat medic in November 1982. He served for six and a half years and reached the rank of Staff Sergeant before attending the Army's Officer Candidate School, and received his commission upon graduation in 1989. As a second lieutenant, he was assigned to the 1st Battalion of the 168th Infantry Regiment of the 34th Infantry Division. He was deployed to Kuwait in 2001, Stabilization Force in Bosnia and Herzegovina in 2003 as a major and Iraq in 2007 as a lieutenant colonel and in 2009 as colonel for a second deployment to Iraq. Jensen was appointed as the 31st Adjutant General of Minnesota by the Governor of Minnesota Mark Dayton on November 1, 2017, he was succeeded by Major General Shawn P. Manke as Adjutant General in 2020.

== Personal life ==
Jensen is married to Cindy A. Schmid, with whom he is the father of three children.

== Awards and decorations ==
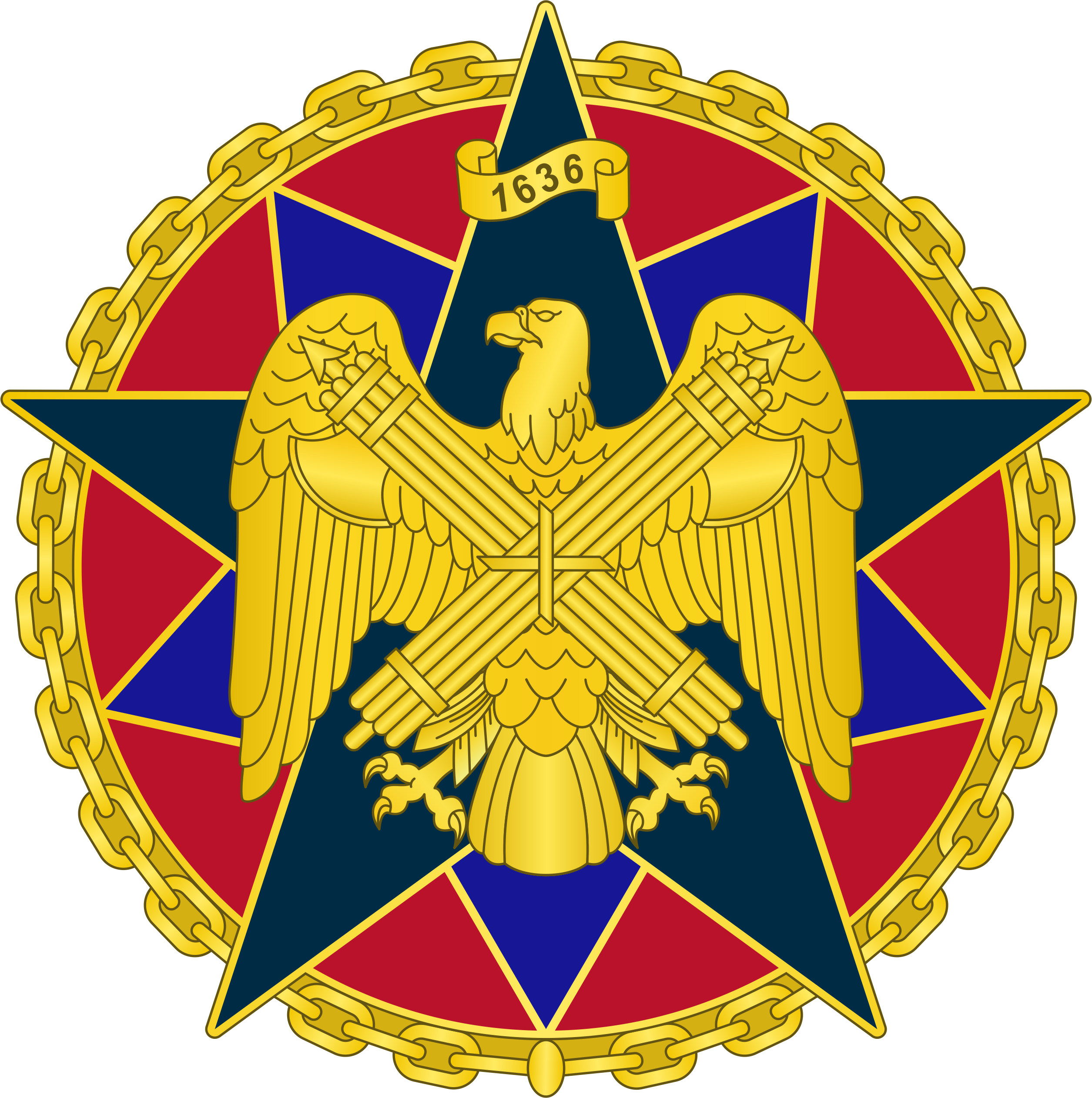
National Guard Bureau Organizational Badge
34th Infantry Division Shoulder Sleeve Insignia
135th Infantry Regiment Distinctive Unit Insignia
2 Overseas Service Bars

Army Distinguished Service Medal
Legion of Merit with one bronze oak leaf cluster
Bronze Star Medal
Meritorious Service Medal with three oak leaf clusters
Army Commendation Medal with four oak leaf clusters
Army Achievement Medal with three oak leaf clusters
Army Meritorious Unit Commendation with oak leaf cluster
Superior Unit Award
Army Reserve Component Achievement Medal with silver oak leaf cluster
National Defense Service Medal with one bronze service star
Armed Forces Expeditionary Medal with service star
Iraq Campaign Medal with two service stars
Global War on Terrorism Expeditionary Medal
Global War on Terrorism Service Medal
Humanitarian Service Medal
Armed Forces Reserve Medal with silver Hourglass device, "M" device and bronze award numeral 3
NCO Professional Development Ribbon
Army Service Ribbon
Army Overseas Service Ribbon with award numeral 2
Army Reserve Overseas Training Ribbon with award numeral 3
NATO Medal for the former Yugoslavia with service star

== Publications ==
- Jensen, Jon A. (2002). The Effect of Operational Deployments on Army Reserve Component Attrition Rates and its Strategic Implications: A Monograph (PDF). Fort Leavenworth, Kansas: School of Advanced Military Studies, United States Army Command and General Staff College. Archived (PDF) from the original on 29 May 2020.

Military offices
Preceded by Richard C. Nash	Adjutant General of Minnesota; 2017–2020	Succeeded by Shawn P. Manke
Preceded by Daniel R. Hokanson	Director of the Army National Guard; 2020–2024	Succeeded by Jonathan Stubbs
Preceded by Marc H. Sasseville	Vice Chief of the National Guard Bureau; Acting; 2024	Succeeded by M. Luke Ahmann; Acting
