= Kirk S. Pierce =

United States Air Force Lieutenant general

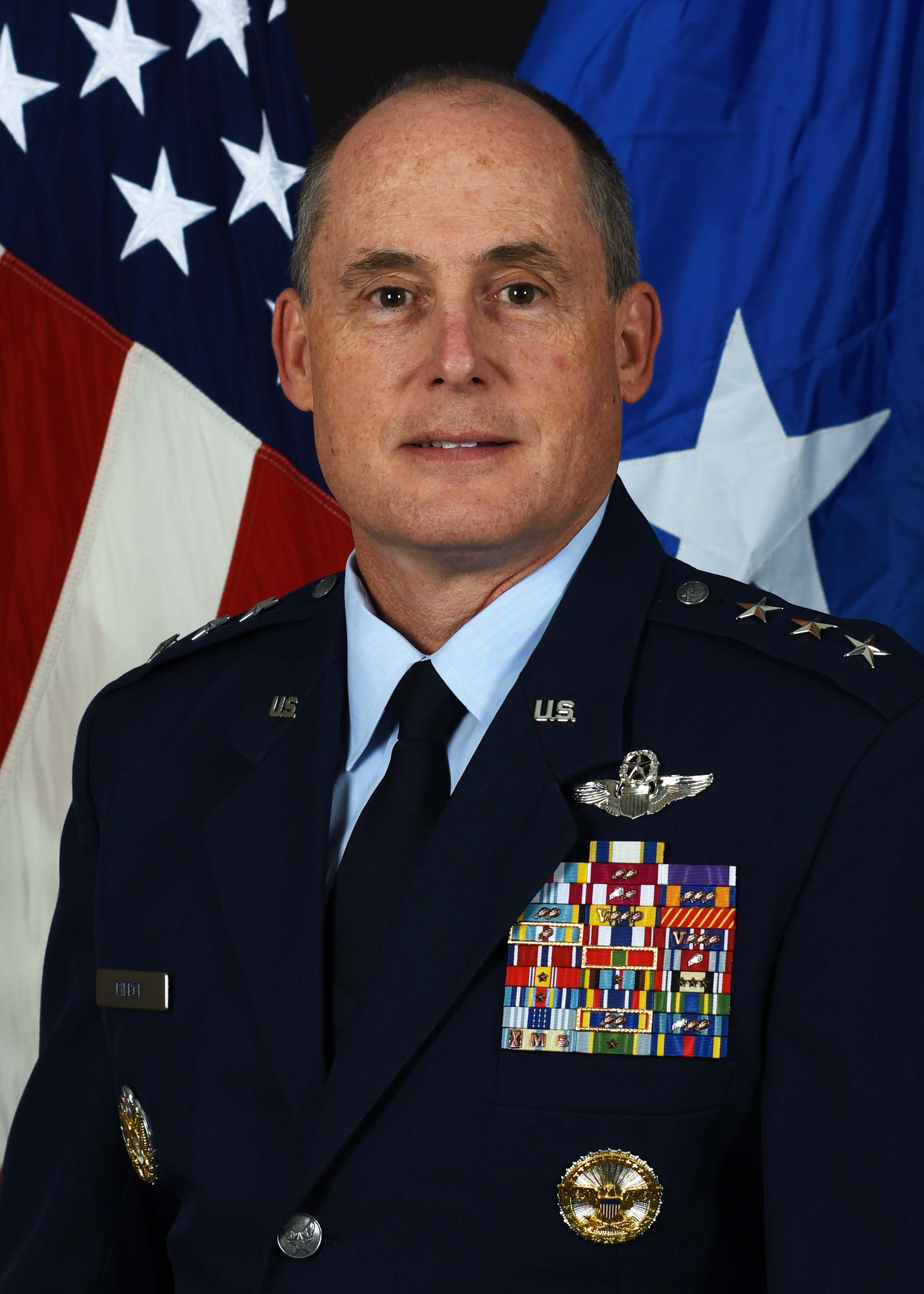
- Military career
- Allegiance: United States
- Branch: United States Air Force
- Service years: 1988–2023
- Rank: Lieutenant General
- Commands: First Air Force; 173rd Fighter Wing; 113th Operations Group; 121st Fighter Squadron
- Conflicts: Iraq War
- Awards: Defense Superior Service Medal; Legion of Merit (3); Purple Heart

Kirk Stewart Pierce is a retired lieutenant general in the United States Air Force. He was a former commander of the First Air Force.

== Air Force career ==
Raised in Victor, New York, Pierce was commissioned in 1988 after he graduated from the University of Notre Dame with a degree in aerospace engineering. He attended pilot training at Williams AFB, and initially flew as a first assignment instructor pilot for the T-38 Talon. He transitioned to flying the F-16 Fighting Falcon in 1995. He was assigned to 79th Fighter Squadron at Shaw AFB and the 80th Fighter Squadron at Kunsan AB. In 2001, he transitioned to the United States Air National Guard, and was assigned to the 138th Fighter Squadron at Hancock Field Air National Guard Base. He commanded the 121st Fighter Squadron and the 113th Operations Group at Andrews AFB, and the 173rd Fighter Wing at Kingsley Field. In July 2020, he assumed command of the First Air Force at Tyndall AFB.

== Awards and decorations ==
US Air Force Command Pilot Badge
Office of the Secretary of Defense Identification Badge
Headquarters Air Force Badge

Defense Superior Service Medal
Legion of Merit with two bronze oak leaf clusters
Purple Heart
Defense Meritorious Service Medal
Meritorious Service Medal with silver and bronze oak leaf clusters
Air Medal with three oak leaf clusters
Aerial Achievement Medal with two oak leaf clusters
Air Force Commendation Medal with "V" device and three oak leaf clusters
Air Force Combat Action Medal
Joint Meritorious Unit Award
Air Force Meritorious Unit Award
Air Force Outstanding Unit Award with Valor device and two oak leaf clusters
Army Superior Unit Award
Air Force Organizational Excellence Award
Combat Readiness Medal with silver oak leaf cluster
National Defense Service Medal with one bronze service star
Armed Forces Expeditionary Medal with service star
Iraq Campaign Medal with three service stars
Global War on Terrorism Expeditionary Medal with service star
Global War on Terrorism Service Medal
Korea Defense Service Medal
Air Force Overseas Short Tour Service Ribbon
Air Force Expeditionary Service Ribbon with gold frame and two oak leaf clusters
Air Force Longevity Service Award with one silver and two bronze oak leaf clusters
Armed Forces Reserve Medal with bronze Hourglass device, "M" device and bronze award numeral 5
Small Arms Expert Marksmanship Ribbon with service star
Air Force Training Ribbon

== Effective dates of promotions ==
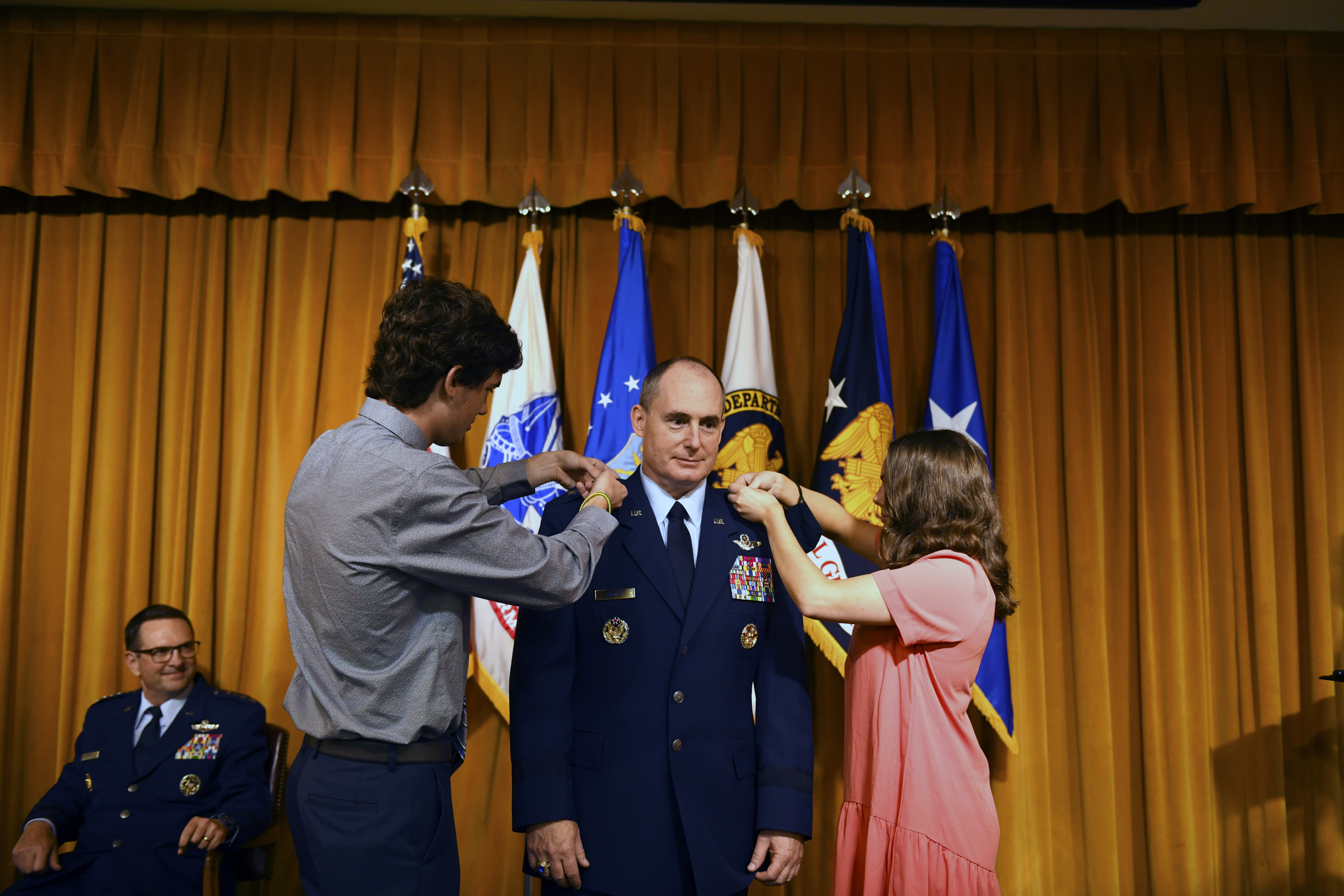
Pierce is promoted to lieutenant general at the Inter-American Defense College, Fort Lesley J. McNair, Washington, D.C. on July 24, 2020.

Insignia	Rank	Date
	Lieutenant general	July 29, 2020
	Major general	Jan 15, 2019
	Brigadier general	April 3, 2016
	Colonel	June 16, 2010
	Lieutenant colonel	Jan 20, 2005
	Major	Nov 19, 1999
	Captain	Oct 29, 1992
	First lieutenant	Oct 29, 1990
	Second lieutenant	May 14, 1988

Military offices
Preceded by Marc H. Sasseville	Deputy Director of the Air National Guard; 2019–2020	Succeeded by Dawne Deskins
Preceded by Marc H. Sasseville	Commander of the First Air Force; 2020–2023	Succeeded by Steven S. Nordhaus
