= Marc H. Sasseville =

United States Air Force lieutenant general

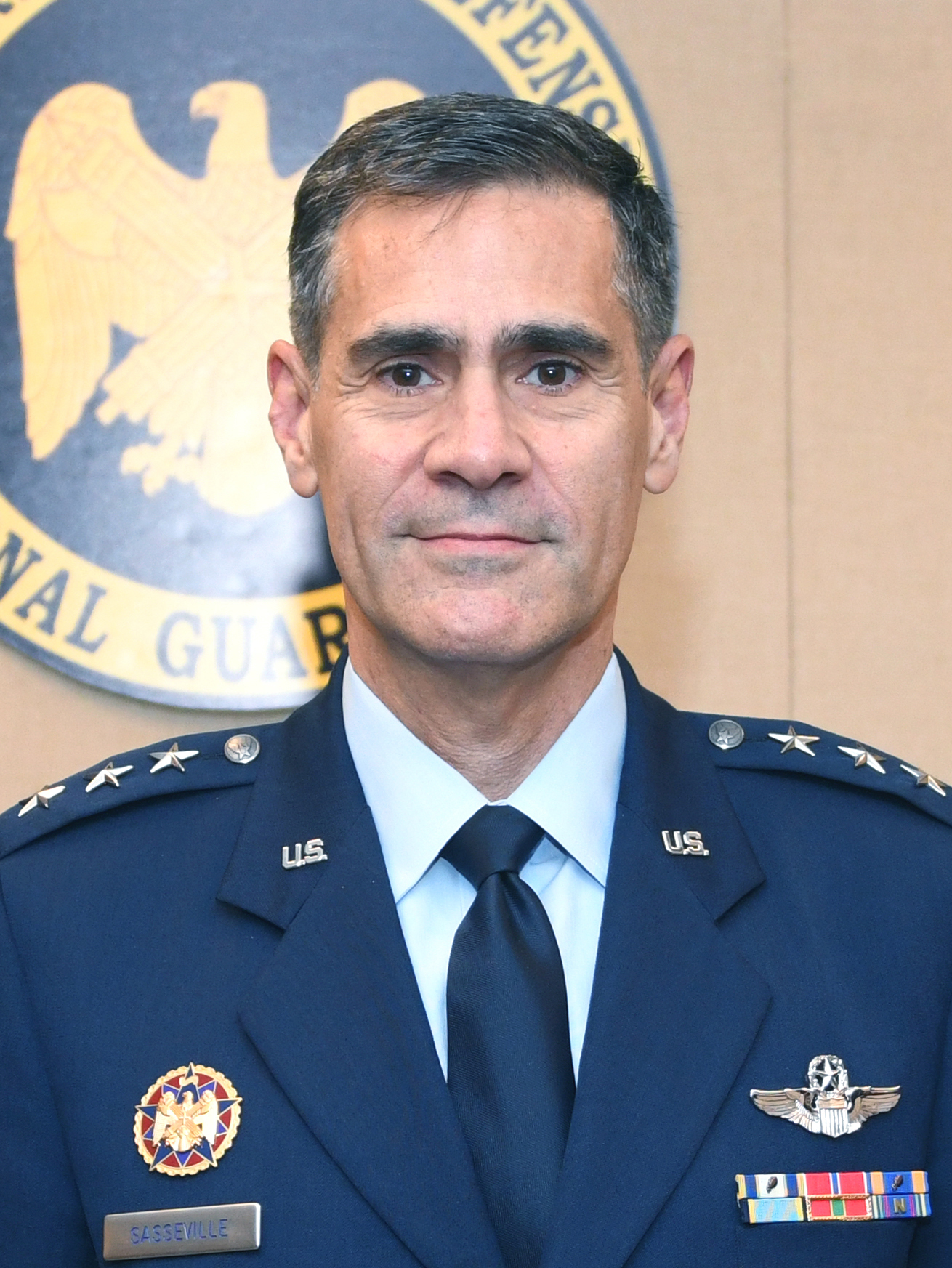
- Sasseville in 2024
- Born: Marc Henry Sasseville Frontera; March 23, 1963 (age 63); Wright Patterson Air Force Base, Ohio, U.S.
- Children: 2
- Military career
- Allegiance: United States
- Branch: United States Air Force; Air National Guard
- Service years: 1985–2024
- Rank: Lieutenant General
- Commands: Vice Chief of the National Guard Bureau; First Air Force; 113th Wing; 113th Operations Group; 121st Fighter Squadron
- Conflicts: Iraq War
- Awards: Air Force Distinguished Service Medal (2); Defense Superior Service Medal (2); Legion of Merit (2); Bronze Star Medal

Marc Henry Sasseville Frontera (born March 23, 1963) is a retired United States Air Force lieutenant general who served as the 12th Vice Chief of the National Guard Bureau. He previously served as the commander of the Continental United States North American Aerospace Defense Command Region and concurrently as commander of the First Air Force (Air Forces Northern) from June 2019 to August 2020. Sasseville previously served as commander of the 113th Wing, District of Columbia Air National Guard at Andrews Air Force Base in Maryland and was the first Hispanic American to hold the position.

On September 11, 2001, Sasseville was the acting operations group commander under the 113th Wing of the D.C. Air National Guard. He was one of four pilots given the mission of finding United Airlines Flight 93 during the September 11 attacks and destroying it, even if it meant ramming the aircraft. He also served as the Senior Defense Official/Defense Attache, Turkey, United States European Command, Ankara, Turkey.

== Early years ==
Sasseville was the oldest of three children born to Yita Frontera Lluch, a native of Yauco, Puerto Rico and Air Force Officer Albert "Al" Sasseville at Wright Patterson Air Force Base, in Ohio. After graduation from high school he was accepted to the United States Air Force Academy in Colorado. On May 29, 1985, he earned his Bachelor of Science degree in International Affairs and a second lieutenant's commission in the Air Force from the academy.

== Military career ==
Sasseville was assigned to the Undergraduate Pilot Training (UPT) program at Columbus Air Force Base, Mississippi, from 1985 to 1986, where he earned his pilot wings. From 1986 to 1987 he was assigned to the F-16 Replacement Training Unit at MacDill Air Force Base in Florida. He was promoted to first lieutenant on May 29, 1987.

Sasseville served in various operational units during his active duty. From 1987 to 1989, Sasseville served in his first overseas assignment as programmer of the 613th Fighter Squadron, 401st Tactical Fighter Wing, at Torrejon Air Base, Spain. He was promoted to captain on May 29, 1989. He then returned to the United States and was assigned as chief of squadron weapons for the 309th Fighter Squadron, 31st Tactical Fighter Wing at Homestead Air Force Base, Florida. In 1992, he went overseas again as flight commander of the 13th Fighter Squadron, and chief of standardizations and evaluations of the 35th Operations Group at Misawa Air Base in Japan.

In 1995, Sasseville was reassigned to Nevada, where he served as wing weapons chief of the 57th Operational Support Squadron, 57th Wing at Nellis Air Force Base. He earned a Master of Arts degree in aeronautical science technology from Embry–Riddle Aeronautical University at the University of Florida in 1996. He served as wing weapons chief until 1997. On January 1 of that same year, he was promoted to major and sent overseas to Kunsan Air Base in the Republic of Korea, where he served as assistant director of operations, 80th Fighter Squadron of the 8th Fighter Wing. From 1998 to 1999, Sasseville was the program manager and F-22 core pilot of the 422nd Test and Evaluation Squadron at Nellis AFB in Nevada.

In 2000, Sasseville joined the District of Columbia Air National Guard as a traditional guardsman. He was promoted to lieutenant colonel on January 18, 2001, and named director of operations, 121st Fighter Squadron, 113th Wing, District of Columbia Air National Guard at Andrews Air Force Base in Maryland.

=== September 11 attacks ===
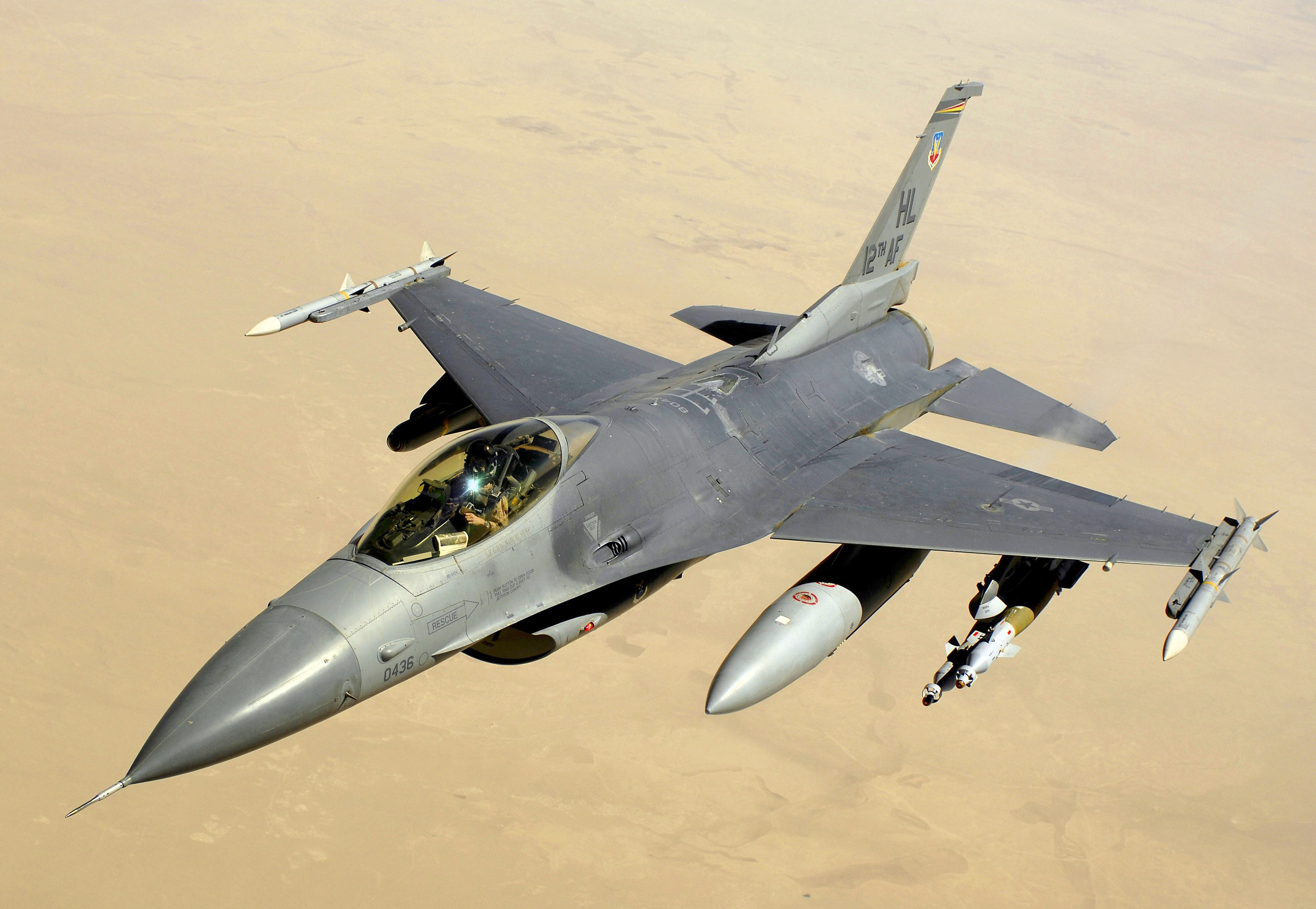
An F-16, the type of aircraft used by Lt. Col. Sasseville in response to the September 11 attacks

On September 11, 2001, United Airlines Flight 93 was hijacked by four members of al-Qaeda as part of the September 11 attacks. The hijackers breached the aircraft's cockpit and overpowered the flight crew approximately 46 minutes after takeoff. Ziad Jarrah, a trained pilot, then took control of the aircraft and diverted it back toward the east coast of the United States in the direction of Washington, D.C. The hijackers' target was either the United States Capitol or the White House.

That morning Major Dan Caine, supervisor of flying with the 113th Wing of the D.C. Air National Guard, received a call that the United States Secret Service wanted fighter jets launched over Washington, D.C. Sasseville called Brigadier General David Wherley, the commander of the 113th Wing, to get permission to use their "war-reserve missiles".

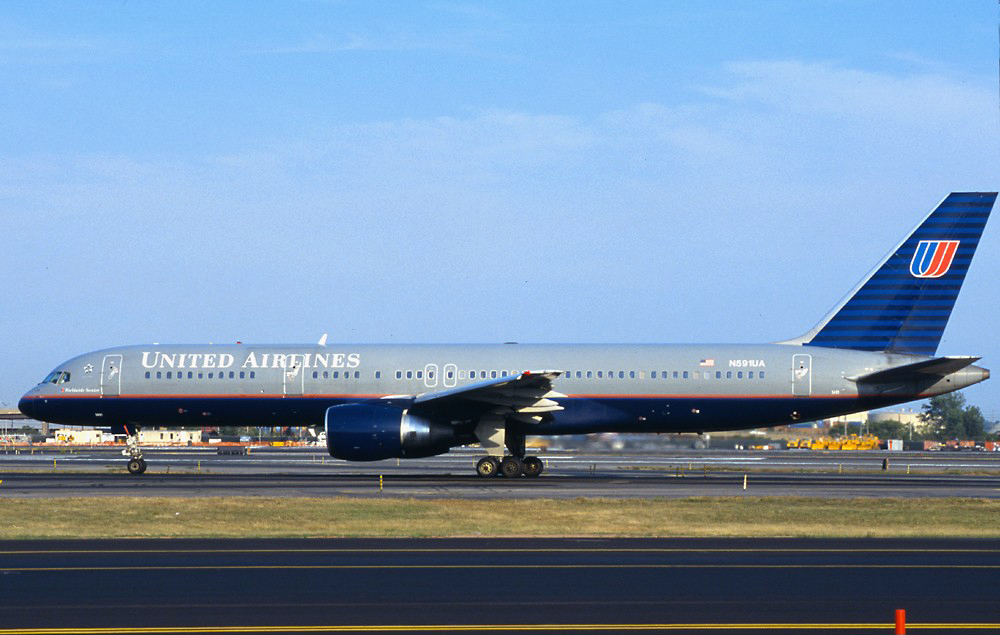
N591UA taxiing on September 8, 2001, three days before it was hijacked

The four pilots who were available for the mission, who received authorization to get airborne in their fighter jets, were Sasseville, Lieutenant Heather Penney, Captain Brandon Rasmussen, and Caine.

The mission was to find United Airlines Flight 93 and destroy it, however they could. Since the fighter jets were absent of missiles and packed only with dummy ammunition from a recent training mission, there was only one way to do it and that was by ramming the aircraft. Sasseville flew his aircraft alongside the aircraft of Penney. They agreed that he would take out the cockpit and that she would take the tail. Later, Sasseville explained: "We don't train to bring down airliners. If you just hit the engine, it could still glide and you could guide it to a target."

The fighter jets passed over the ravaged Pentagon building; however, it was not until hours later that they would find out that United 93 had already gone down in a field outside Shanksville, Pennsylvania, killing all 44 people aboard including the 4 hijackers. The 9/11 Commission later determined that United 93 crashed at least 35 minutes before Sasseville and Penney took off, and likely would have reached Washington at least 15 minutes before they were airborne.

=== Post 9/11 ===
In 2003, Sasseville was deployed during Operation Iraqi Freedom and participated in major combat operations as Commander of the 410th Expeditionary Operations Support Squadron.

Sasseville returned to the United States and served as the Commander of the 121st Fighter Squadron, 113th Wing. In 2004 he attended the Air War College and took a course in correspondence. He continued as Commander of the 121st Fighter Squadron until April 21, 2005, when he was promoted to the rank of colonel and named Commander of the 113th Operations Group. During this time period he attended the Advanced Joint PME (RC), Joint Forces Staff College in Norfolk, Virginia and in 2007, the Reserve Component National Security Course at the National Defense University in Arlington, Virginia From 2008 to 2010, Sasseville served as Vice Commander of the 113th Wing. He took the Joint Task Force Commander's Course at Peterson Air Force Base in Colorado in 2009. Upon completion of the course, he was assigned as Deputy Director for Readiness in the Office of the Assistant Secretary of Defense Reserve Affairs in the Pentagon.

=== Commander of the 113th Wing ===
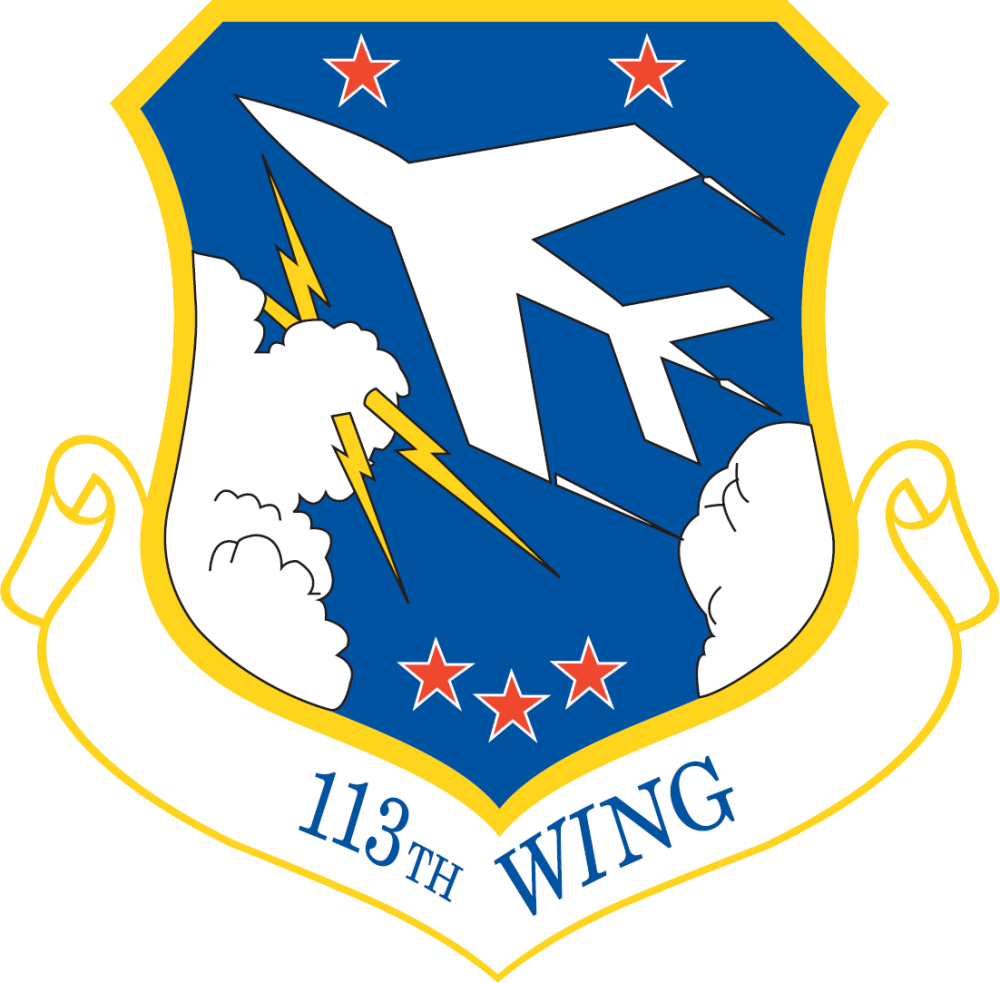
Emblem of the 113th Wing

On August 3, 2012, Sasseville was promoted to the rank of brigadier general and named the Commander of the 113th Wing, District of Columbia Air National Guard, Andrews Air Force Base in Maryland. In this capacity he was responsible for more than 1200 personnel in support of both the F-16 (Air Combat Command) fighter and the C-38 and C-40 VIP airlift (Air Mobility Command) aircraft missions. He was also in charge of the Aerospace Control Alert Detachment, which is responsible for the air defense of the United States Capital.

Sasseville's retirement ceremony was held on May 29, 2024.

== Personal life ==
Sasseville's wife is a stateside Puerto Rican. They have two children.

== Awards and decorations ==
Among Sasseville's military decorations and badges are the following:

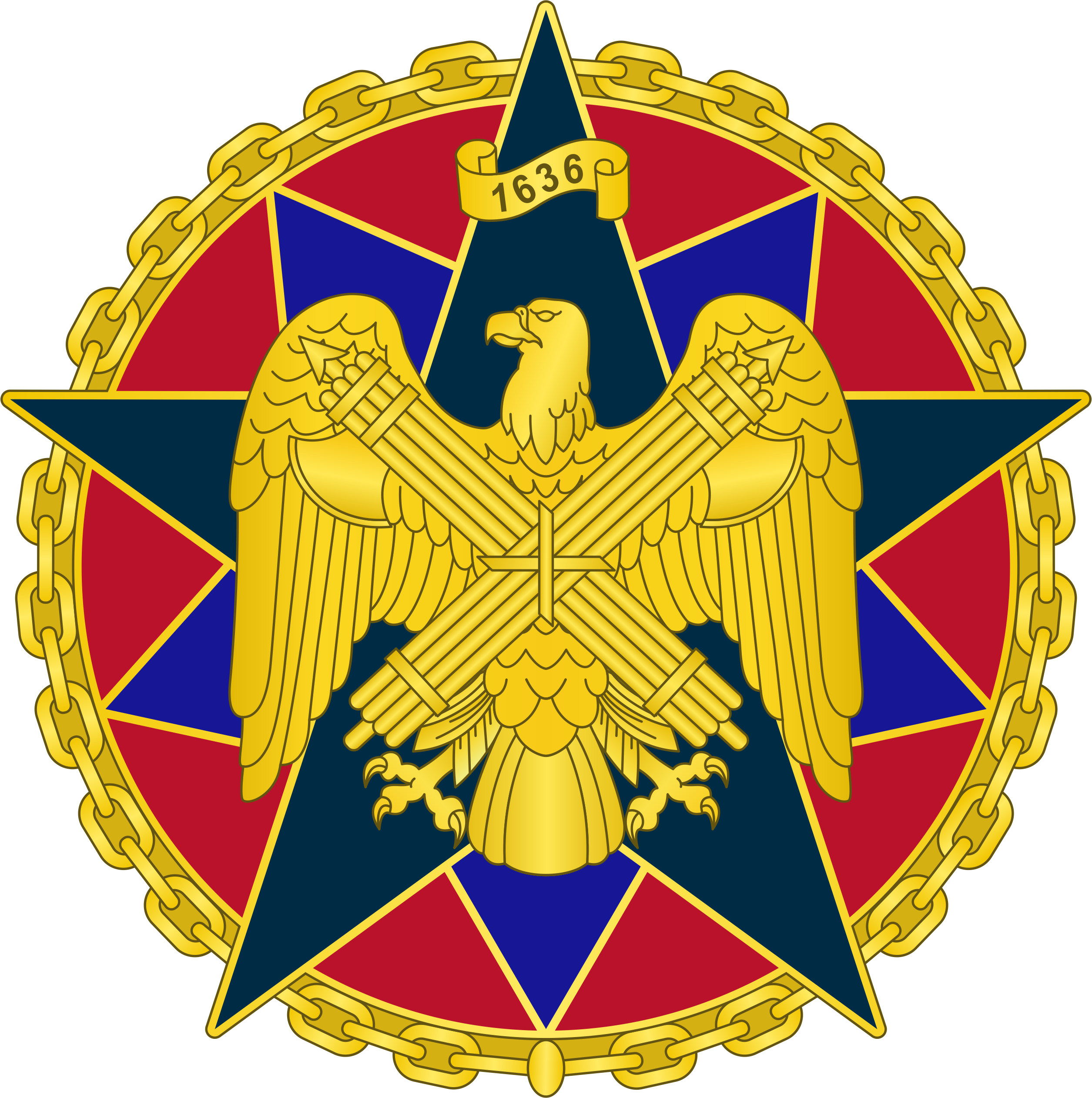
Command Pilot Badge
Basic Parachutist Badge
Office of the Secretary of Defense Identification Badge
Joint Chiefs of Staff Identification Badge
National Guard Bureau Organizational Badge

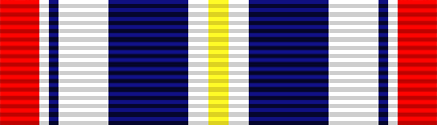
Air Force Distinguished Service Medal with one bronze oak leaf cluster
Defense Superior Service Medal with oak leaf cluster
Legion of Merit with oak leaf cluster
Bronze Star Medal
Meritorious Service Medal with three oak leaf clusters
Air Medal with oak leaf cluster
Aerial Achievement Medal
Air Force Commendation Medal
Air Force Achievement Medal
Joint Meritorious Unit Award
National Intelligence Meritorious Unit Citation
Air Force Outstanding Unit Award with Valor device, one silver and one bronze oak leaf clusters
Army Superior Unit Award
Combat Readiness Medal with eight oak leaf clusters
National Defense Service Medal with one bronze service star
Iraq Campaign Medal with one service star
Global War on Terrorism Expeditionary Medal
Global War on Terrorism Service Medal
Korea Defense Service Medal
Nuclear Deterrence Operations Service Medal with 'N' device
Air Force Overseas Short Tour Service Ribbon
Air Force Overseas Long Tour Service Ribbon
Air Force Expeditionary Service Ribbon with gold frame
Air Force Longevity Service Award with one silver and three bronze oak leaf clusters
Armed Forces Reserve Medal with silver Hourglass device, "M" device and bronze award numeral 2
Small Arms Expert Marksmanship Ribbon with service star
Air Force Training Ribbon

== Effective dates of promotions ==
Rank	Date
Second Lieutenant	May 29, 1985
First Lieutenant	May 29, 1987
Captain	May 29, 1989
Major	January 1, 1997
Lieutenant Colonel	January 18, 2001
Colonel	April 21, 2005
Brigadier General	August 3, 2012
Major General	June 22, 2016
Lieutenant General	June 18, 2019

== See also ==
- List of notable Puerto Ricans
- List of Puerto Rican military personnel
- Hispanics in the United States Air Force
- The Secret History of 9/11

== Notes ==
Military offices
Preceded by ???	Senior Defense Official and Defense Attaché to Turkey; 2014–2016	Succeeded by John R. Gordy
Preceded by Brian G. Neal	Deputy Director of the Air National Guard; 2017–2019	Succeeded by Kirk S. Pierce
Preceded by R. Scott Williams	Commander of the First Air Force; 2019–2020	Succeeded by Kirk S. Pierce
Preceded by Daniel R. Hokanson	Vice Chief of the National Guard Bureau; 2020–2024	Succeeded by Jon A. Jensen; Acting
