= Continental NORAD Region =

Joint U.S.-Canadian defense region

Continental U.S. NORAD Region
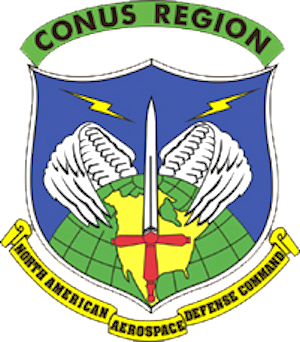
- Continental U.S. NORAD Region
- Active: 1 October 1986-Present (40 years, 1 month)
- Country: United States
- Branch: United States Air Force
- Role: Air Defense
- Garrison/HQ: Tyndall Air Force Base Palm Beach, Florida
- Website: Continental U.S. NORAD Region (CONR)

Commanders
- Commander: Lt Gen M. Luke Ahmann, USAF
- Deputy Commander: MGen S.T. Boyle, RCAF

The Continental U.S. NORAD Region (CONR) is a component of the North American Aerospace Defense Command (NORAD) that provides airspace surveillance and control and directs air sovereignty activities for the continental United States (CONUS). CONR is one of three NORAD regions. The two other Regions are the Canadian NORAD Region (CANR) and the Alaskan NORAD Region (ANR).

Since September 11, 2001, CONR has been the lead agency for Operation Noble Eagle, an ongoing mission to protect the continental United States from further terrorist aggression from inside and outside U.S. borders.

== Operations ==
CONR is located at Tyndall Air Force Base, Florida, and has responsibility over two air defense sectors: the Western Air Defense Sector at McChord Air Force Base, Washington state and the Eastern Air Defense Sector at Rome, New York.

The CONR Air Operations Center perform the NORAD air sovereignty mission for the continental United States. CONR plans, conducts, controls, coordinates, and ensures air sovereignty and provides for the air defense of the nation. McDonnell Douglas F-15 Eagle and General Dynamics F-16 Fighting Falcon fighters are CONR's primary weapons systems.

CONR consists of 10 Air National Guard fighter wings and made up primarily of citizen airmen.

== Deputy Area Air Defense Commander (Army) ==
The 263rd Army Air and Missile Defense Command, when required, assumes lead operational headquarters responsibilities in support Of Commander, US Element North American Aerospace Defense Command, for support and oversight of Homeland Defense ADA missions. In this role it is tasked to detect, deter, divert, and if necessary defeat airborne attacks within the NORAD area of operation and provide direct support, Deputy Area Air Defense Commander, to Continental NORAD Region (CONR) Area Air Defense Commander within the CONR area of operation, including in regard to the National Capital Region Integrated Air Defense System.

The 263 AA&MDC also serves as a supporting command to U.S. Army North for all Army Air Defense Artillery missions as required. The 263rd AA&MDC serves as Theater Army Air and Missile Defense Coordinator to ARNORTH Joint Forces Land Component Commander for planning, coordination, integration, and execution to defeat or destroy Short and Medium Range Ballistic Missile threats to the US Northern Command Combatant Commander's designated priorities. When required, Additionally, they serve as a supporting command to First Army and United States Army Forces Command for active duty Training Readiness Authority for Homeland Defense Army ADA missions. Execute functional coordination with the US Army Space and Missile Defense Command to include new technology insertion and testing for Homeland Defense Army ADA missions.
