= Bradley Swanson =

U.S. Air Force general

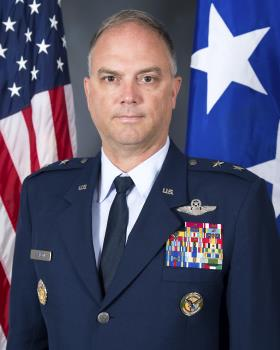
- Official portrait, 2019
- Military career
- Allegiance: United States
- Branch: United States Air Force
- Service years: 1989–2021
- Rank: Major General
- Commands: 153rd Airlift Wing; 113th Operations Group; 201st Mission Support Squadron
- Conflicts: Gulf War; Iraq War
- Awards: Legion of Merit (2)

Bradley A. Swanson is a retired United States Air Force major general who last served as the director of exercises and training of the United States Central Command.

Military offices
Preceded by ???	Commander of the 153rd Airlift Wing; 2014–2016	Succeeded by Paul S. Lyman
Preceded by ???	Director of Plans, Programs, and Requirements of the National Guard Bureau; 2016–2017	Succeeded by John P. Hronek
Preceded by Jon K. Mott	Deputy Director of Strategy, Plans and Policy of the United States Central Command; 2017–2019	Succeeded by Duke A. Pirak
Preceded by Jon K. Mott	Director of Exercises and Training of the United States Central Command; 2019–2021	Succeeded by Steven J. deMilliano
