= Air National Guard Readiness Center =

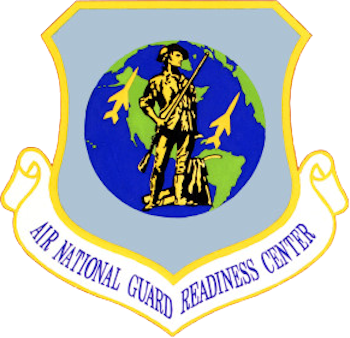
- Air National Guard Readiness Center - Emblem
- Active: 1 June 1979 - present (46 years, 8 months)
- Country: United States
- Branch: United States Air Force
- Role: Field Operating Agency
- Website: www.ang.af.mil/about/ANGRC/

The Air National Guard Readiness Center (ANGRC) is based at Joint Base Andrews, Maryland, and performs operational and technical functions to ensure combat readiness of Air National Guard units and is a channel of communication between the National Guard Bureau and the states on Air National Guard operational activities.

The commander is responsible for four detachments and 23 operating locations with an authorized strength of 734 military and civilian personnel. Its mission is to provide service and support to the Air National Guard and help accomplish its total Air Force mission.

It was established as the Air National Guard Support Center, and activated as a direct reporting unit, on 1 June 1979. Effective 5 February 1991, its status was changed from a direct reporting unit to a field operating agency. It was re-designated as Air National Guard Readiness Center on 1 June 1992

== Commanders ==
- Brig Gen R. Scott Williams 5 Aug 2012
- Col Mark Sheehan 3 Jun 2012
- Brig Gen Brian G. Neal 16 Aug 2010
- Col Michael J. McDonald 27 Jul 2009
- Col G. Kevin Thompson 8 Jun 2009
- Brig Gen Joseph L. Lengyel 10 Oct 2006
- Col Michael E. Hillestad 21 Dec 2004
- Brig Gen David A. Brubaker 16 Nov 2001
- Maj Gen Paul A. Weaver, Jr. 18 May 2001
- Brig Gen Craig R. McKinley 28 Jan 1998
- Brig Gen Paul A. Weaver, Jr. 25 Oct 1996
- Maj Gen Donald W. Shepperd 17 Apr 1995
- Brig Gen Larry K. Arnold 4 Dec 1989
- Maj Gen Philip G. Killey 1 Nov 1988
- Maj Gen John B. Conaway 1 Apr 1981
- Maj Gen John T. Guice 21 Oct 1976

== See also ==
- Andrews Air Force Base
- Air Force District of Washington
- National Capital Region (United States)
- Continental Air Command
- Air Force Reserve Command
