= Vermont Garrison =

American flying ace (1915–1994)

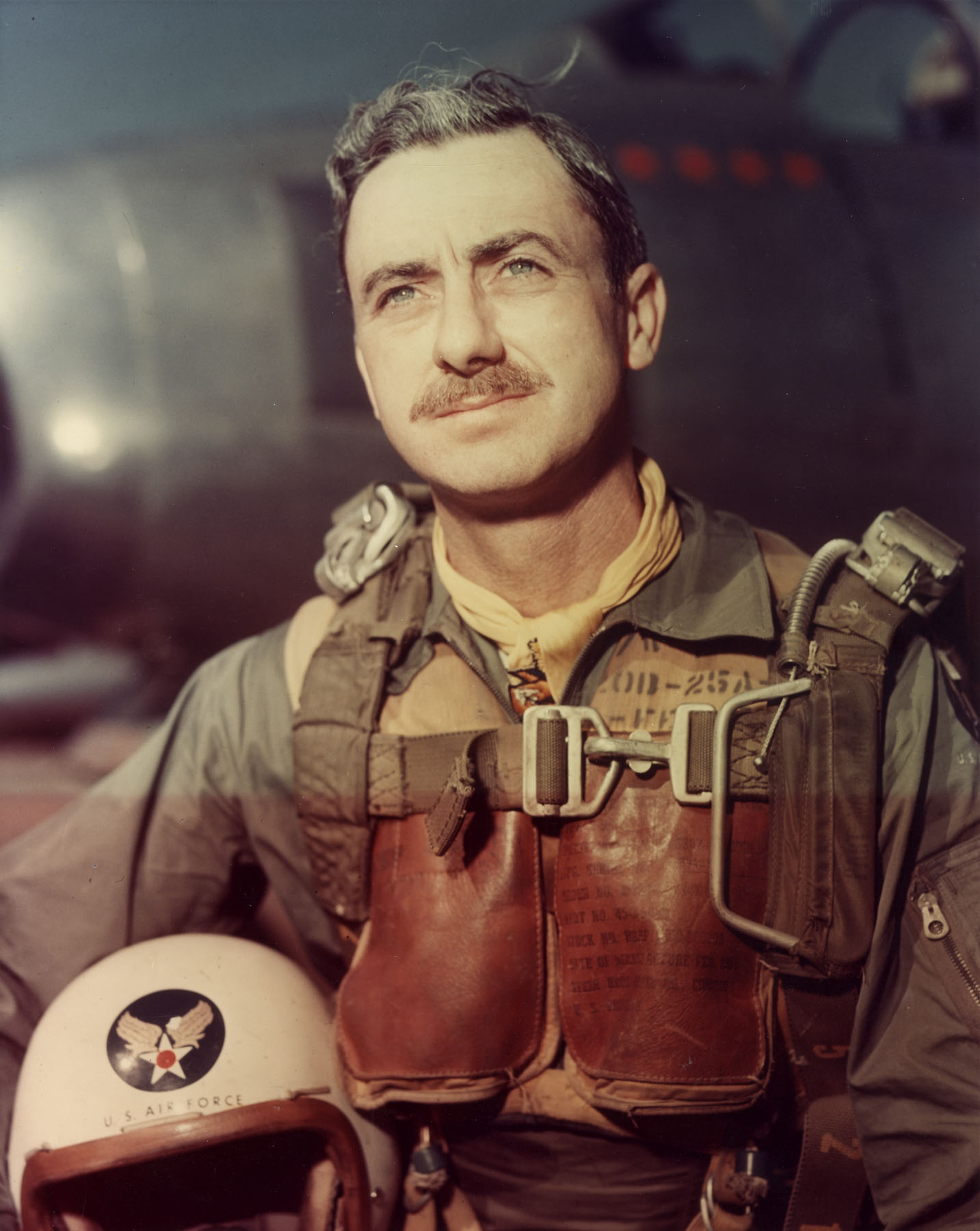
- Vermont Garrison in Korea, 1953
- Born: October 29, 1915; Mt. Victory, Kentucky, U.S.
- Died: February 14, 1994 (aged 78); Mountain Home, Idaho, U.S.
- Burial place: Arlington National Cemetery
- Military career
- Allegiance: United States
- Branch: United States Air Force
- Service years: 1943–1973
- Rank: Colonel
- Nicknames: "Garry", "The Gray Eagle", "Pappy"
- Commands: 335th Fighter-Interceptor Squadron; 405th Fighter Wing; 408th Fighter Group; 4780th Air Defense Wing
- Conflicts: World War II; Korean War; Vietnam War
- Awards: Distinguished Service Cross; Silver Star (2); Legion of Merit (2); Distinguished Flying Cross (7); Bronze Star Medal (3); Purple Heart; Air Medal (11)

Vermont Garrison (October 29, 1915 – February 14, 1994) was a career officer in the United States Air Force, and a flying ace credited with 17.33 victories in aerial combat. He was one of only seven Americans to achieve ace status during World War II, then again against jet fighter opposition during the Korean War. (Note: Dubbed "the inner seven." The other six are USAF pilots Brig. Gen. Harrison R. Thyng, Col. Francis S. Gabreski, Col. James P. Hagerstrom, Major William T. Whisner, and Major George A. Davis, Jr.; and Marine Lt. Col. John F. Bolt.) In 1966, Garrison participated in his third war, as vice commander of the 8th Tactical Fighter Wing, and flew a full tour of bombing and fighter missions over North Vietnam.

During all three of his combat tours, Garrison was consistently older than his peers, becoming an ace in World War II at the age of 28, in Korea at the age of 37, and flying Rolling Thunder missions at the age of 51. For this and his renown as a gunnery expert, Garrison was known in the service as "The Gray Eagle". (Note: Seen variously as the "Ole Gray Eagle", the "graying eagle", and "the Gray Fox".)

U.S. Air Force historian and author Walter J. Boyne described Garrison as a "first-rate combat unit leader." Robin Olds, commanding the 8th TFW in Thailand, said of his vice commander: "Of the many hundreds I've served with, Garry was one of the greatest—as pilot, as gentleman, as officer, and as friend."

== Biography ==
Garrison was born on a farm near the tiny hamlet of Mt. Victory, in Pulaski County, Kentucky, a part of Appalachia. He was a younger half-brother to his father's first child and the oldest of five sons and three daughters (one of which died in infancy) born to Mayhue H. Garrison and his second wife, Shelta Harriet Sears Garrison. While he grew up farming and timbering to help his family subsist, he also completed a basic education despite the Great Depression. He graduated from Pulaski County Public Schools in 1933, then went on to two years at Eastern Kentucky State Teachers College, and earned a teaching certificate after a term at Sue Bennett Junior College in nearby London. He taught elementary school in one-room schools between 1936 and 1941.

Following his return from World War II, Garrison was married to Reatha Mae Cuthbert of London, Kentucky, until her death in July 1959. Garrison remarried in August 1961 at Mountain Home, Idaho, to Marie E. Lee. The couple resided in Idaho after his 1973 retirement and raised three daughters and a son. Garrison died of a heart attack on February 14, 1994, in Mountain Home. He is buried at Arlington National Cemetery.

== World War II ==
=== Royal Air Force ===
On March 17, 1941, Garrison enlisted in the United States Army and became an aviation cadet in Class 41-C at Muskogee, Oklahoma, but washed out of advanced flight training at Brooks Field, Texas, in October. Garrison promptly enlisted in the Royal Air Force at Dallas, Texas and completed flight training at El Centro, California. After obtaining his RAF wings, Pilot Officer Garrison was shipped to England, where after further training he was promoted to Flying Officer and made a gunnery instructor, posted to RAF Hawarden to train pilots flying North American Mustangs.

=== Army Air Forces ===
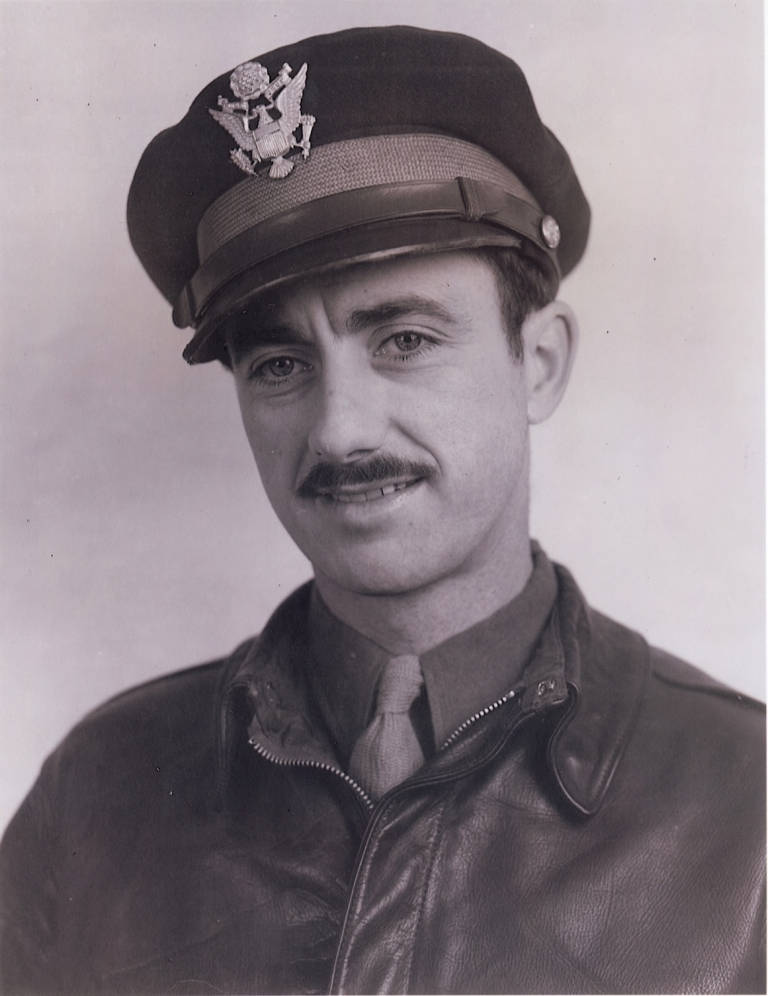
Garrison as a first lieutenant during World War II

On July 13, 1943, Garrison transferred from the RAF to the United States Army Air Forces, receiving a commission as a first lieutenant. On September 26, after transition training in the P-47 Thunderbolt at RAF Atcham, he was assigned to the 4th Fighter Group, based at RAF Debden, as a member of the 336th Fighter Squadron. (Note: The 336th FS had formerly been No. 133 Squadron RAF, an Eagle Squadron, until September 1942.) Garrison's first combat mission came on October 4, 1943. The 4th Fighter Group was assigned to support a task force of 3rd Bomb Division B-17s on its withdrawal after bombing Frankfurt am Main, Germany. It proceeded to the rendezvous-point at Eupen, Belgium, but could find no bombers, remained in the vicinity for 16 minutes, and then withdrew.

Garrison recorded his first combat victory returning from a bomber withdrawal support mission to Bremen on December 16, 1943. In exceptionally bad winter weather conditions, he shared credit for shooting down a Junkers Ju 88 fighter over the German-Dutch border with Don Gentile and Louis Norley. (Note: The kill was also the first USAAF victory for both Gentile, who was eventually credited with 19.83, and Norley, who was awarded 10.33 kills.) A month later, on January 14, 1944, he downed two Focke-Wulf Fw 190s, although his claim report for the second kill credited half to Norley. A review of his gun camera film, however, resulted in the award to Garrison of both victories. By February 10 he had scored his fifth kill and made ace, followed by a sixth victory on February 25, during an escort mission supporting the Big Week bomber offensive.

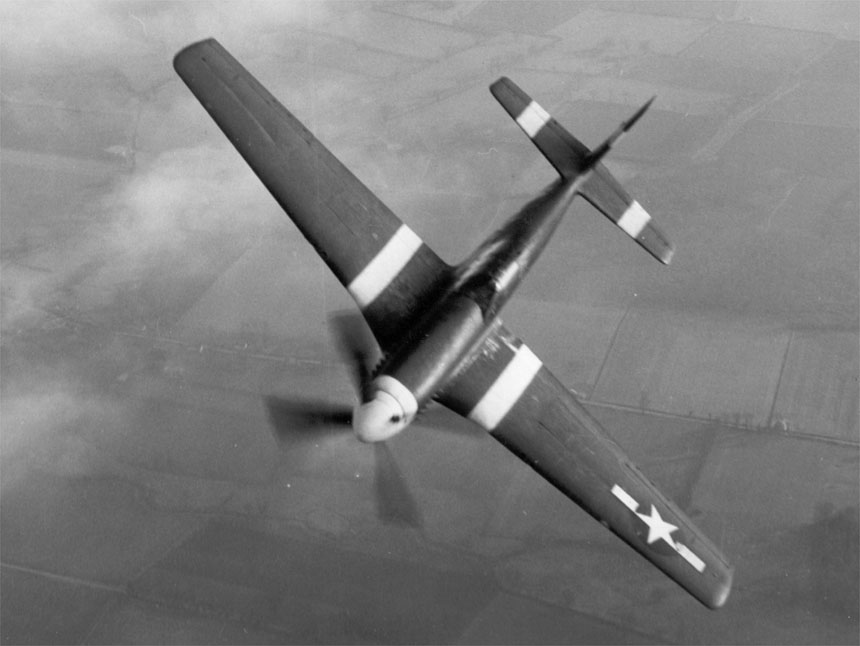
P-51B Mustang

The next day his squadron began conversion to the P-51B Mustang fighter. On March 3, 1944, the 4th Fighter Group flew a bomber support mission to Berlin for the first time, resulting in several large aerial engagements. Garrison was part of a flight of nine P-51s of the 4th engaging more than 60 Luftwaffe fighters attacking bombers at 24,000 feet near Wittenberg. Three of the flight, including Garrison, were shot down. Despite losing his aircraft's supercharger and having three of its four guns jam, Garrison shot down an Fw 190 and received a "probable" for downing a Messerschmitt Bf 110. Flying back to England at low level with two wingmen, one of whom had a damaged engine and could not maintain altitude, Garrison was shot down by antiaircraft fire near Boulogne-sur-Mer and bailed out. Captured almost immediately, he was subjected to two weeks of interrogations, then shipped to Stalag Luft I, the German Prisoner-of-war camp near Barth, Germany.

== U.S. Air Force ==
=== Post-war service ===
Liberated on May 1, 1945, by Soviet troops, Garrison elected to rejoin his squadron rather than return to the United States. He remained with the 336th FS until it was inactivated in September 1945, then transferred to the 406th Fighter Group on occupation duty in Germany. In 1946 he transferred to the 56th Fighter Group at Selfridge Field, Michigan, where he again flew P-47s. Garrison rejoined the 4th Fighter Group (now a component of the 4th Fighter Wing (4th FW)) at Andrews Air Force Base, Maryland, in April 1947, was promoted to captain, and became part of the U. S. Air Force when it became an independent service on September 18.

Garrison organized and led a jet aerial demonstration team for the 4th FW, flying P-80 Shooting Stars, (Note: Garrison led, with Captains Erwin A. "Sandy" Hesse and Beriger A. Anderson as wingmen, and Capt. Lawrence E. McCarthy in slot. Anderson, a World War II P-47 pilot, was killed in action in Korea in November 1950 when his F-51D was shot down. Hesse became a general officer before his retirement.) and participated in the first official delivery of air mail by jet to celebrate the 30th anniversary of air mail on May 15, 1948. Using the same route as in 1918, Garrison delivered a packet from Washington, D.C. to New York City in a 28-minute flight. (Note: The 1918 flight took three hours 20 minutes.) In May, 1949, he led the team representing the 4th FW at the first Air Force Worldwide Gunnery Competition at Las Vegas Air Force Base, Nevada, winning the jet portion of the competition.

Garrison's noted gunnery skills and prior instructor experience resulted in his transfer in May 1950 to Las Vegas, now Nellis Air Force Base, where the USAF converted its flying training establishment into the USAF Aircraft Gunnery School. After completing the gunnery course, he remained at Nellis as an instructor and R&D officer of the 3596th Advanced Applied Tactics (later "Combat Crew Training") Squadron, where one of the instructors was Captain Manuel J. Fernandez. Garrison formed another unit jet air demonstration team, the "Mach Riders", with Fernandez and future ace Captain William H. Wescott on wing. (Note: The slot pilot was Captain Wendell D. Brady, and Captain William L. Craig flew a solo demonstration. Both were former World War II P-47 pilots and career USAF officers.)

At the outbreak of the Korean War, while many experienced fighter pilots deployed to combat, Garrison continued in his combat crew training role at Nellis. He was promoted to major in 1951 and took command of the 3596th CCTS. The commander of the 4th Fighter-Interceptor Wing (successor to the 4th FW) requested Garrison by name to join the wing, and in November 1952 Garrison went to Kimpo Air Base, Korea, as operations officer of the 335th Fighter-Interceptor Squadron.

=== Korean War ===
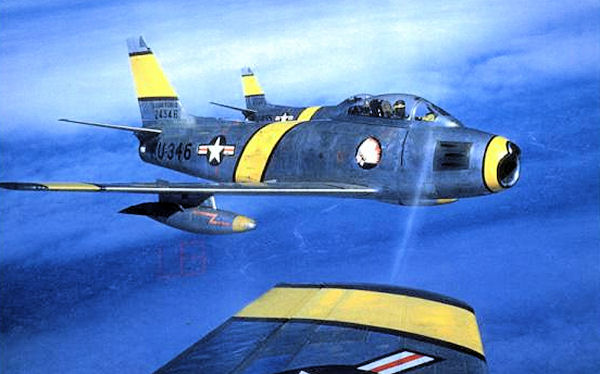
North American F-86F Sabres of the 335th FIS "Chiefs" over Korea

In January 1953, Garrison took command of the 335th FIS. The "GunVal Project", seven F-86s and five veteran pilots, was attached to the squadron to test armament modifications in combat. North American Aviation removed the six M3 .50-caliber machine guns from four late-production F-86Es and six block-one F-86Fs, expanded the size of the gun bays, strengthened the surrounding frame assemblies, and mounted four newly developed T-160 20mm cannon in their place. Having a similar rate of fire, the cannons were expected to significantly increase the Sabre's lethality over that of the machine guns, whose armor-piercing incendiary ammunition was usually ineffective against jet aircraft above 35,000 feet (11,000 m). However, the heavier weight and bulk of the cannons and ammunition, while providing greater effective range, flatter trajectory, and higher velocity, limited the F-86 to only 400 total rounds, which reduced its total firing time by nearly 75%, from 16 to 4.6 seconds.

Garrison worked closely with the project after one of the test aircraft was lost in combat on January 25 because its engine experienced compressor stall from ingesting the cannons' propellent gases. He regularly flew GunVal Sabres on missions before the testing ended on May 1, and despite firing limitations imposed by the stall risk, scored a MiG-15 victory in a cannon-equipped F-86F, near Sui-ho Reservoir on March 26. (Note: The GunVal aircraft were restricted to firing only the two upper guns when above 35,000 feet, and none at all above 40,000 feet (12,000 m), although the latter restriction was disregarded because the MiG-15 had a service ceiling above 50,000 feet (15,000 m).)

His first victory came on February 21, 1953, during his 18th mission as 335th FIS commander. Engaging a pair of MiGs in a "dogfight", Garrison was nearly shot down as he became too focused on his quarry and failed to detect a MiG closing in from behind, then became locked into a Lufbery circle. When the MiGs broke the circle and tried to escape, both he and his wingmen destroyed one. With just two MiG credits in his first six months of his tour, Garrison's tally increased dramatically in the final three months of combat before the Korean armistice. In early 1953, the size of the Fifth Air Force's F-86 force doubled, increasing competitiveness among its pilots for victories over largely inexperienced communist pilots. Garrison achieved two kills in May.

On June 5, 1953, he led a fighter sweep to the mouth of the Yalu River in the northwest corner of "MiG Alley" at 45,000 feet (14,000 m). Observing approximately 40 MiGs in the process of taking off from an airfield in Manchuria, he led his flight of four aircraft in an attack on the vulnerable fighters, diving at Mach 1 through a protective top cover of MiGs 20,000 feet (6,100 m) over the base. Almost immediately he shot down a MiG at low altitude, followed by a second soon after, as every member of the flight scored a kill, a rare if not unique occurrence. (Note: The pilots in Garrison's flight were 1st Lt. Harry A. Jones, Capt. Lonnie R. Moore, and 2nd Lt. William E. Schrimsher. USAF credited Moore and Schrimsher each with half of the final MiG shot down by the flight, reputed to be the 700th of the war.) In addition to recognition as the USAF's 32nd jet ace, Garrison was awarded the Distinguished Service Cross for the mission. He was promoted to lieutenant colonel on June 25, 1953, and scored his final MiG victory on July 19, eight days before the armistice.

=== Professional career ===
Garrison finished his tour on Korea on October 28, 1953. His next assignment was in the newly activated 4750th Training Wing (Air Defense) at Yuma (later Vincent) Air Force Base, Arizona, an Air Defense Command organization developing tactics and training pilots to fly the F-86D rocket-firing interceptor. There he worked in conjunction with wing commander Col. Glenn Eagleston and 4750th Training Squadron commander Lt. Col. James Jabara, both aces who also served in the 4th FIW in Korea.

Garrison attended the Marine Corps Amphibious Warfare Senior Officers Course (now the Marine Corps Command and Staff College) at Marine Corps Base Quantico from September 1957 to June 1958, then served a tour at Headquarters USAF in the Pentagon. Later assigned to Tyndall Air Force Base, Florida, he was promoted to colonel in March 1961. Assigned to the 25th Air Division at McChord Air Force Base, Washington, Garrison served on the command staff and as senior advisor to the Washington Air National Guard through the early 1960s.

=== Vietnam War and service to retirement ===
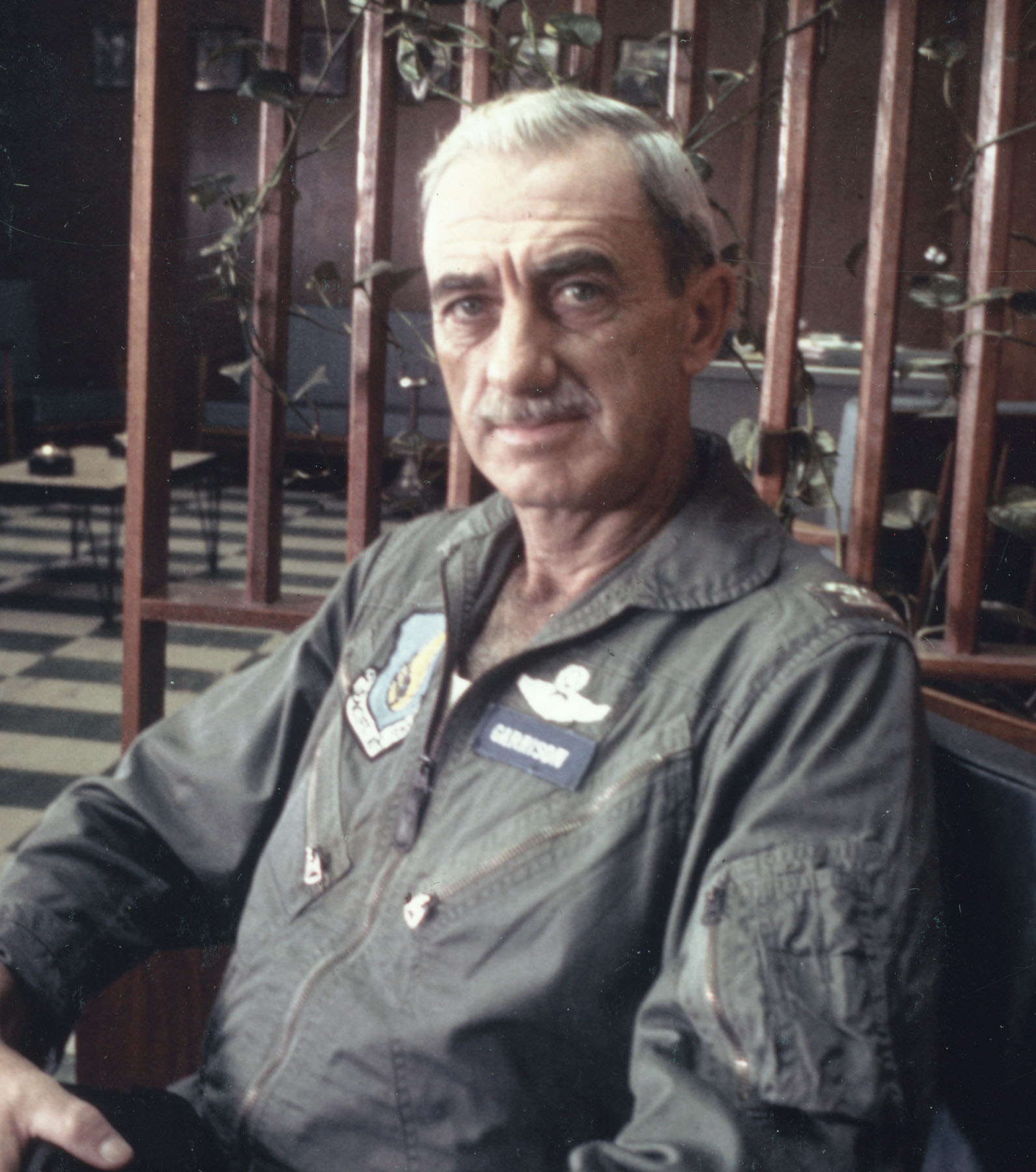
Garrison in an undated photo

In August 1965, Garrison returned to combat for the third time in his career, becoming deputy commander for operations (DCO) of the 405th Fighter Wing at Clark Air Base in the Philippines. The 405th was a composite wing of F-100 Super Sabre and F-102 Delta Dagger fighters, and B-57 Canberra bombers serving temporary duty (TDY) rotations in South Vietnam. Shortly after, Garrison moved up to vice commander, and on January 5, 1966, advanced to his first wing command. He remained in command of the 405th until August 4, 1966, when he was succeeded by Colonel Chuck Yeager.

From Clark AB, Garrison was assigned as vice commander of the 8th Tactical Fighter Wing at Ubon Royal Thai Air Force Base, Thailand, in August 1966. The following month Colonel Robin Olds was made commander of the 8th TFW to invigorate its combat spirit, and together with deputy commander of operations Colonel Daniel "Chappie" James and Garrison, provided one of the strongest and most experienced command triumvirates in Southeast Asia. Garrison flew the F-4C Phantom II on 97 missions over North Vietnam and Laos, although Olds noted that Garrison never formally "checked out" (qualified) in the type, as a result of which he always flew with an instructor pilot in the rear seat. In describing Garrison's combat experience, Olds observed that Garrison flew his "52nd combat mission on his 52nd birthday" while at Ubon. (Note: Olds misspoke, as the mission was Garrison's 51st on his 51st birthday, October 29, 1966.) Olds also noted that by 1967 Garrison was:

...so nearsighted he carried about four different pairs of glasses with him...but by God, if you wanted a target bombed, he would hit it. He would hit it when everybody else missed. ...He got furious with me because I wouldn't let him get up there among the MiGs. I told him, 'Pappy, every fighter pilot in the Air Force knows and loves you, and I am not going to be the guy that sends you up there to get your butt scragged.' He just could not see anymore.

He finished his tour on June 5, 1967, turning over his vice commander's slot to James.

Between the end of his combat tour and his retirement on March 1, 1973, Garrison served in a number of command slots: commanding officer of the F-101 Voodoo-equipped 408th Fighter Group at Kingsley Field, Oregon, from July 1967 to August 1968; vice commander of the 26th Air Division at Adair Air Force Station, Oregon, to June 1969; commander of the 4780th Air Defense Wing at Perrin Air Force Station, Texas, to July 1971; and commanding officer of the 4661st Air Base Group at Hamilton Air Force Base, California, to his retirement.

== Aerial victory credits ==
Date	#	Type	Location	Aircraft flown	Unit Assigned
December 16, 1943	0.33	Ju 88	Papenburg, Germany	P-47C	336 FS, 4 FG
January 14, 1944	2	Fw 190	Compiègne Woods, France	P-47D	336 FS, 4 FG
January 31, 1944	1	Bf 109	Gilze-Rijen, Netherlands	P-47D	336 FS, 4 FG
February 6, 1944	1	Fw 190	Beauvais–Margny, France	P-47D	336 FS, 4 FG
February 10, 1944	1	Bf 109	Dümmer Lake, Germany	P-47D	336 FS, 4 FG
February 25, 1944	1	Fw 190	Luxembourg	P-47D	336 FS, 4 FG
March 3, 1944	1	Fw 190	Berlin, Germany	P-51B	336 FS, 4 FG
February 21, 1953	1	MiG-15	Tangmok-Tang, North Korea	F-86F	335 FIS, 4 FIG
March 26, 1953	1	MiG-15	Sui-Ho Reservoir, North Korea	F-86F-2	335 FIS, 4 FIG
May 17, 1953	1	MiG-15	Yalu River	F-86F	335 FIS, 4 FIG
May 23, 1953	1	MiG-15	Yonsu-dong, North Korea	F-86F	335 FIS, 4 FIG
June 5, 1953	2	MiG-15	Fengcheng, China	F-86F	335 FIS, 4 FIG
June 24, 1953	1	MiG-15	Sakchu, North Korea	F-86F	335 FIS, 4 FIG
June 26, 1953	1	MiG-15	Namsi-dong, North Korea	F-86F	335 FIS, 4 FIG
June 30, 1953	1	MiG-15	Unbong-dong, North Korea	F-86F	335 FIS, 4 FIG
July 19, 1953	1	MiG-15	Ch'oryon-gwan, North Korea	F-86F	335 FIS, 4 FIG

SOURCES: Air Force Historical Study 85: USAF Credits for the Destruction of Enemy Aircraft, World War II and Air Force Historical Study 81: USAF Credits for the Destruction of Enemy Aircraft, Korean War; Oliver, The Inner Seven, p. 66.

None of Garrison's assigned aircraft was named or featured nose art. He scored all but the last of his 7.33 World War II victories in P-47 Thunderbolts 41–6573, marked VF: S, and 42–74663, marked VF: H. His final kill was also the plane in which he was shot down, P-51B 43–6871, with the VF:H markings. His Korean War MiG-15 kills were made in F-86F 51–12959, an unrecorded GunVal Project F-86F-2, and F-86Fs 51-12944 and 51–12953.

== Awards and decorations ==
Vermont Garrison's ribbons, including retroactive awards.

US Air Force Command Pilot Badge

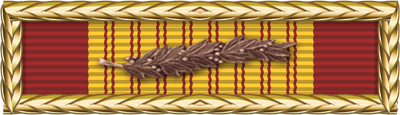
Distinguished Service Cross
Silver Star with bronze oak leaf cluster
Legion of Merit with bronze oak leaf cluster
Distinguished Flying Cross with silver and bronze oak leaf clusters
Bronze Star Medal with two bronze oak leaf clusters
Purple Heart
Air Medal with two silver oak leaf clusters
Air Force Commendation Medal
Presidential Unit Citation
Air Force Outstanding Unit Award with two oak leaf clusters
Prisoner of War Medal
American Defense Service Medal
American Campaign Medal
European-African-Middle Eastern Campaign Medal with bronze campaign star
World War II Victory Medal
Army of Occupation Medal
National Defense Service Medal with bronze service star
Korean Service Medal with three bronze campaign stars
Vietnam Service Medal with bronze campaign star
Air Force Longevity Service Award with silver and three bronze oak leaf clusters
Small Arms Expert Marksmanship Ribbon
Republic of Korea Presidential Unit Citation
Vietnam Gallantry Cross Unit Award
United Nations Service Medal for Korea
Vietnam Campaign Medal

=== Distinguished Service Cross citation ===
Garrison, Vermont
Lieutenant Colonel, U.S. Air Force
335th Fighter-Interceptor Squadron, 4th Fighter-Interceptor Wing, 5th Air Force
Date of Action: June 5, 1953
Headquarters, Far East Air Forces: General Orders No. 387 (October 13, 1953)
Citation:

The President of the United States of America, under the provisions of the Act of Congress approved July 9, 1918, takes pleasure in presenting the Distinguished Service Cross to Lieutenant Colonel Vermont Garrison, United States Air Force, for extraordinary heroism in connection with military operations against an armed enemy of the United Nations while serving as a Pilot with the 335th Fighter-Interceptor Squadron, 4th Fighter-Interceptor Wing, FIFTH Air Force, in action against enemy forces in the Republic of Korea on June 5, 1953. On that date, while leading a flight of four F-86 aircraft near the Yalu River, Colonel Garrison sighted a formation of ten MIG-15s far below. Diving down, Colonel Garrison pressed dangerously close behind the lead MIG in order that the remainder of his formation could assume attacking positions. With one long burst of his guns, Colonel Garrison caused the MIG to explode and disintegrate. Then, at great risk to his life, Colonel Garrison flew directly through the debris from the explosion, in order to attack another enemy MIG and fully exploit the tactical advantage already gained. Courageously disregarding a hail of enemy fire from behind him, and in the face of heavy odds, Colonel Garrison, after violent maneuvering, closed on the second MIG, scoring hits which caused it to explode and crash. As a result of Colonel Garrison's intrepidity and keen flying skill, his flight was able to engage other MIGs in the forefront of the enemy formation, successfully destroying three of them. The enemy, having lost one-half of his force in less than two minutes, and thoroughly demoralized by the heroic and telling attack of Colonel Garrison and his formation, turned and withdrew from the scene of action in defeat. Through Colonel Garrison's selfless courage and inspiring leadership, the tide of battle was turned and his flight was credited with the destruction of five MIGs, two of which were destroyed by Colonel Garrison.

== Notes ==
Footnotes

Citations
