= 408th Armament Systems Group =

408th Armament Systems Group

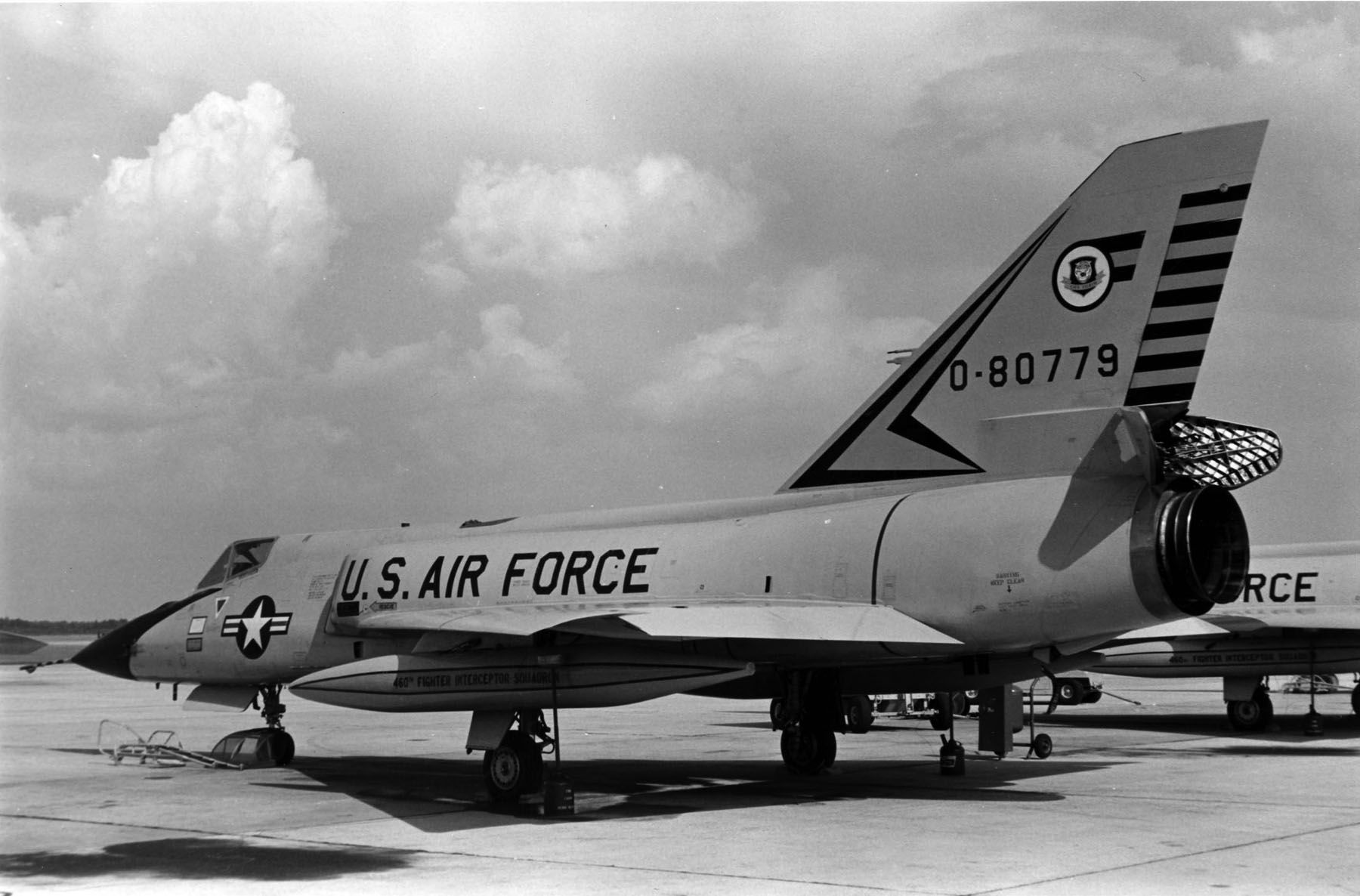
- 460th Fighter-Interceptor Squadron F-106 Delta Dart (Note: Aircraft is Convair F-106A-100-CO serial 58-0179.)
- Active: 1943–1944; 1956–1970; 2006–2010
- Country: United States
- Branch: United States Air Force
- Role: Systems development
- Part of: Air Force Materiel Command
- Motto: Defend With Vigilance

Insignia
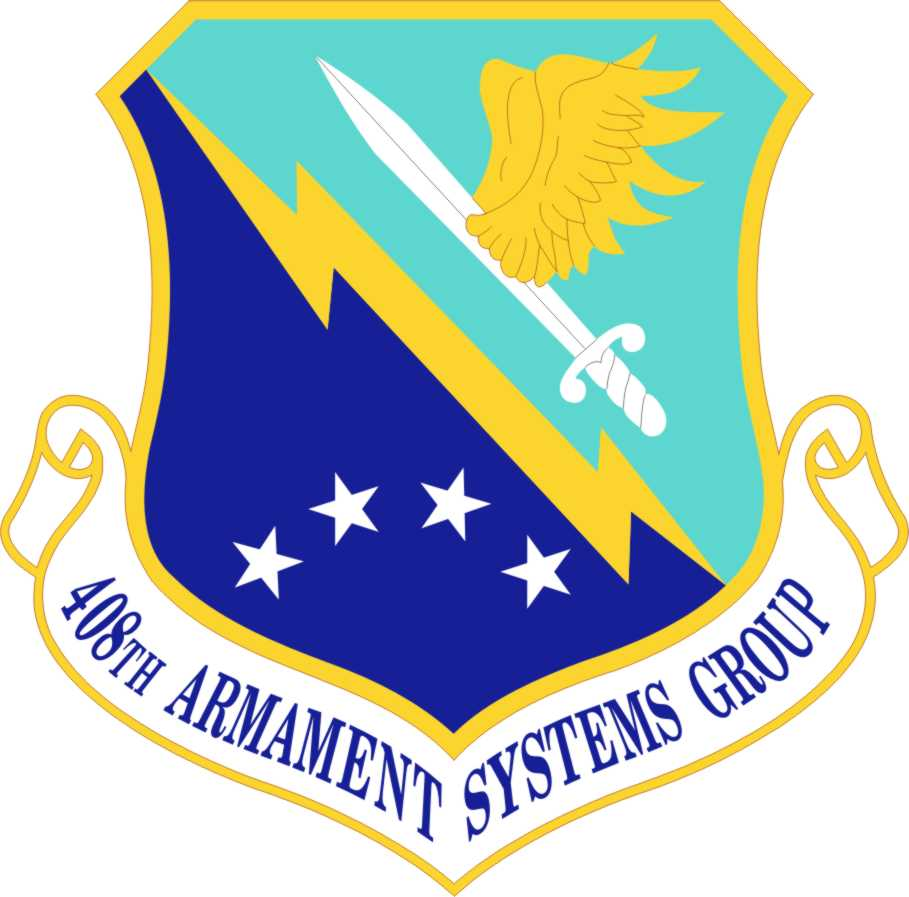
- 408th Armament Systems Group emblem

The 408th Armament Systems Group is an inactive United States Air Force (USAF) unit. Its last assignment was with Air Force Materiel Command's 308th Armament Systems Wing at Eglin Air Force Base, Florida. It was inactivated in 2010.

The group was first activated at Key Field, Mississippi in 1943 as the 408th Bombardment Group, and equipped with single engine dive-bomber aircraft. It became a fighter-bomber group later that year when the Army Air Forces renamed its dive bomber units. The group was an operational and replacement training unit until it was disbanded in the spring of 1944 when the AAF reorganized its training and support units on a functional basis.

The group was reactivated in 1956 at Klamath Falls Municipal Airport, Oregon as the 408th Fighter Group, an air defense unit. For the first three years at Klamath Falls (renamed Kingsley Field) it managed the construction of USAF facilities and provided support to Air Defense Command units there and at Keno Air Force Station. It received McDonnell F-101 Voodoos in 1959 and until it was inactivated in 1970, provided air defense in the northwestern United States with Voodoos and, later, with Convair F-106 Delta Darts.

In 2006 the group was activated once again as the 408th Armament Systems Group when Air Force Materiel Command (AFMC) reorganized to replace its traditional systems management offices with wings, groups and squadrons. It provided armament acquisition support until inactivating in 2010 when AFMC returned to its previous organizational model.

== History ==
=== World War II ===
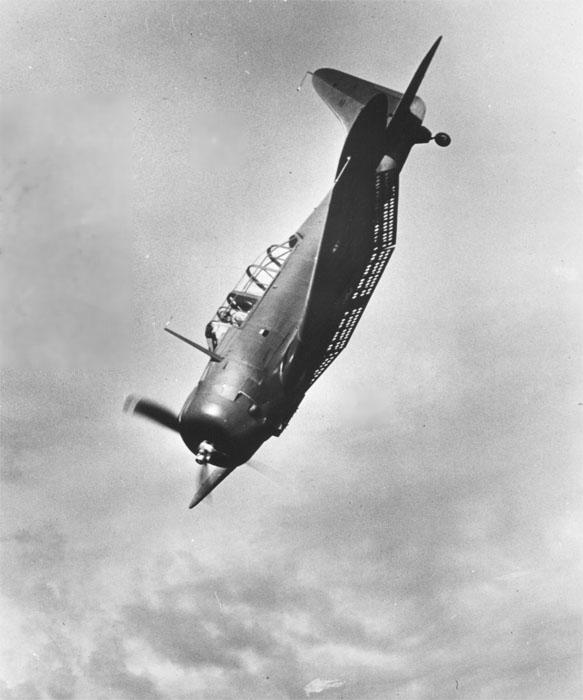
A-24 diving

The group was activated in April 1943 as the 408th Bombardment Group at Key Field, Mississippi, with the 636th, 637th, 638th, and 639th Bombardment Squadrons assigned. In August, as were other Army Air Forces (AAF) single engine bomber units, it was redesignated as the 408th Fighter-Bomber Group and its squadrons were renumbered as the 518th, 519th, and 520th Fighter-Bomber Squadrons. (Note: Because AAF fighter groups usually had three, rather than four squadrons, the 639th was disbanded, not redesignated.) The group did not receive aircraft to begin training until October. It served as an operational training unit, providing cadres to "satellite groups" and a replacement training unit, training individual pilots. In February 1944, the 455th Fighter-Bomber Squadron was assigned, although it was detached from the group for most of its assignment. The 455th also participated occasionally in demonstrations and maneuvers.

However, the Army Air Forces (AAF) was finding that standard military units, based on relatively inflexible tables of organization, were proving less well adapted to the training mission. Accordingly, a more functional system was adopted in which each base was organized into a separate numbered unit. Accordingly, the group was disbanded in 1944 as the AAF converted to the AAF Base Unit system and replaced by the 267th AAF Base Unit (Combat Crew Training Station, Fighter) in a reorganization of the AAF in which all units not programmed for deployment overseas were replaced by AAF Base Units to free up manpower for assignment overseas.

=== Cold War ===
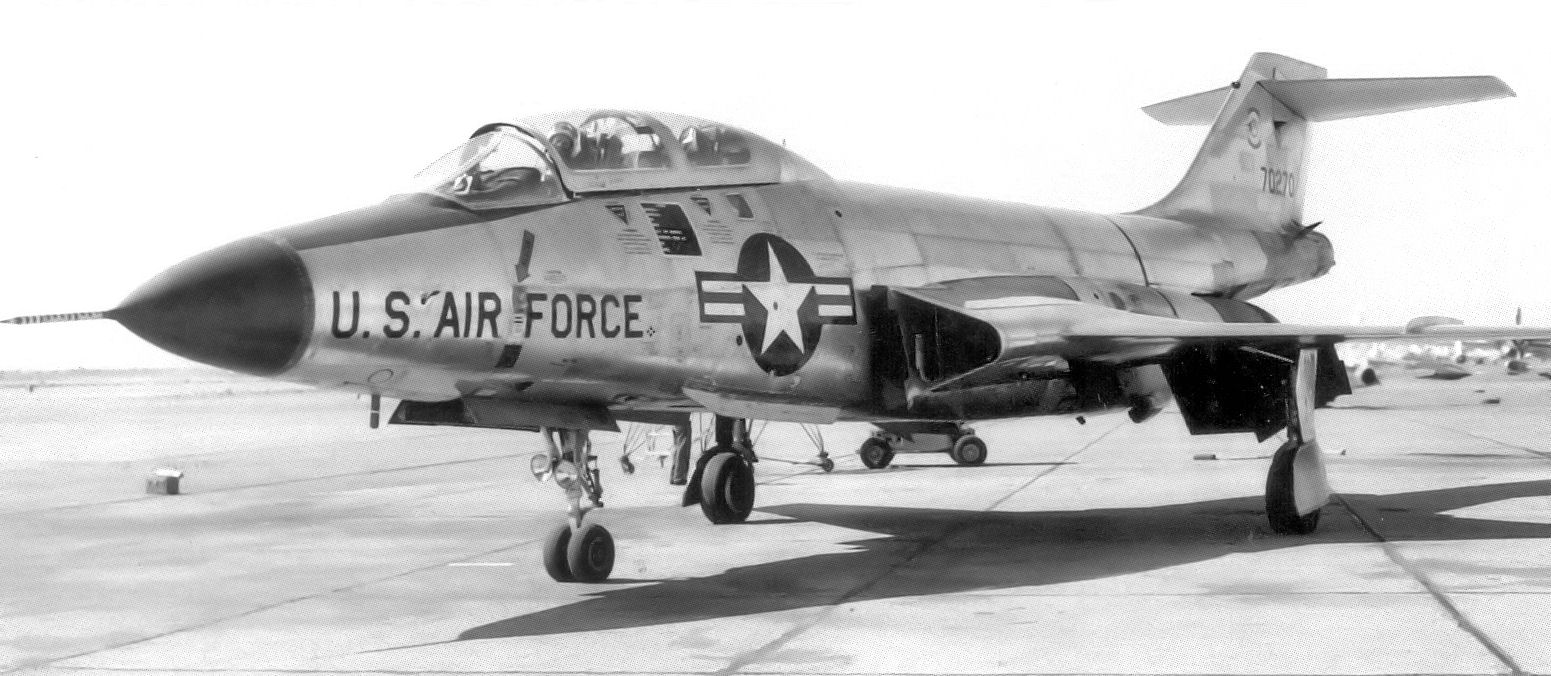
322d FIS F-101 at Kingsley Field (Note: Aircraft is McDonnell F-101B-85-MC Voodoo Serial 57–0270. Picture taken in 1959.)

The group was reconstituted and redesignated as the 408th Fighter Group (Air Defense) in 1955 and activated in 1956 at Klamath Falls Municipal Airport, Oregon to defend the Pacific Northwest. It also became the USAF host organization for Klamath Falls and was assigned a number of support units to fulfill this mission. Its operational squadron was the 518th Fighter-Interceptor Squadron (FIS), which was activated and assigned in June. The group and squadron were authorized Mighty Mouse rocket and airborne intercept radar equipped North American F-86 Sabres, but the squadron was not manned and the group remained only a support organization. Instead, the group oversaw the construction of facilities to support its squadron and the 827th Aircraft Control and Warning Squadron, located at nearby Keno Air Force Station. (Note: The 827th's operations and maintenance facilities were located at Keno. Housing, administrative and support facilities were at Kingsley.)

In April 1959, the group gained its second operational squadron, the 322d FIS, which moved to what was now Kingsley Field from Larson Air Force Base, Washington and immediately began converting to McDonnell F-101 Voodoo aircraft. The Voodoo was equipped with data link to communicate directly with Semi-Automatic Ground Environment computers at Combat Direction Centers. Three months later, the 518th FIS inactivated without ever having been more than a paper unit at Kingsley. At the end of September 1968, the 322d FIS inactivated and was replaced by the activating 59th FIS, which took over its personnel and equipment. In December 1969, the 59th FIS stood down shortly after the 460th FIS, flying Convair F-106 Delta Darts moved to Kingsley from Oxnard Air Force Base, California. In the fall of 1970, the group inactivated and transferred its remaining support mission, personnel and equipment to the 4788th Air Base Group, while the 460th FIS was reassigned directly to the 25th Air Division.

=== Air Armament Center ===
The Area Attack Systems Group was activated at Eglin Air Force Base, Florida in 2005 as part of the Air Force Materiel Command Transformation reorganization, in which traditional project offices were replaced by wings, squadrons and groups. In 2006 most of these organizations were consolidated with World War II units and given the numbers of the older units. As a result of this, the group became the 408th Armament Systems Group. Its mission was to provide armament acquisition support. Its support responsibilities included Advanced Medium-Range Air to Air Missile, Joint Direct Attack Munition, Communications and Information Technology, Foreign Military Sales, and weaponeering. In 2007, the various systems squadrons assigned to the 308th Wing were realigned. The group was inactivated in 2010, along with its assigned squadrons, when the 308th Armament Systems Wing was inactivated and the center returned to a project office organizational structure.

== Lineage ==
408th Fighter Group

- Constituted as the 408th Bombardment Group (Dive) on 23 March 1943

Activated on 5 April 1943
Redesignated 408th Fighter-Bomber Group on 10 August 1943
Disbanded on 1 April 1944

- Reconstituted and redesignated 408th Fighter Group (Air Defense), on 8 July 1955 (Note: The USAF constituted a 408th Strategic Fighter Wing' on 3 March 1953. This wing was never made active and is a separate unit from the group. Ravenstein, p. 221.)

Activated on 8 April 1956
Inactivated on 1 October 1970

- Redesignated 408th Tactical Fighter Group on 31 July 1985 (not active)
- Consolidated with Area Attack Systems Group as Area Attack Systems Group on 3 May 2006

Area Attack Systems Group

- Constituted as Area Attack Systems Group on 23 November 2004

Activated on 27 January 2005
Consolidated with 408th Tactical Fighter Group on 3 May 2006

- Redesignated 408th Armament Systems Group on 10 May 2006

Inactivated on 30 June 2010

=== Assignments ===
- Third Air Force, 10 February 1942
- 72d Fighter Wing, 1 November 1943 – 1 April 1944 (Note: Maurer, Combat Units, p. 406 gives years, but not exact dates.)
- 28th Air Division, 8 April 1956
- 25th Air Division, 1 March 1959
- Spokane Air Defense Sector, 15 April 1960
- 25th Air Division, 1 September 1963
- 26th Air Division, 1 April 1966
- 25th Air Division, 15 September 1969 – 1 October 1970
- Air to Ground Munition Systems Wing(later 308th Armament Systems Wing), 27 January 2005 – 30 June 2010

=== Units assigned ===
Operational Squadrons

- 59th Fighter-Interceptor Squadron: 30 September 1968 – 17 December 1969
- 322d Fighter-Interceptor Squadron: 1 April 1959 – 30 September 1968
- 455th Fighter-Bomber Squadron: 12 February–1 April 1944 (detached to I Tactical Air Division 8 March 1944 – 1 April 1944)
- 460th Fighter-Interceptor Squadron: 1 November 1969 – 1 October 1970
- 636th Bombardment Squadron (Dive) (later 518th Fighter-Bomber Squadron, 518th Fighter-Interceptor Squadron): 5 April 1943 – 1 April 1944; 8 June 1956 – 1 July 1959
- 637th Bombardment Squadron (Dive) (later 519th Fighter-Bomber Squadron): 5 April 1943 – 1 April 1944
- 638th Bombardment Squadron (Dive) (later 520th Fighter-Bomber Squadron): 5 April 1943 – 1 April 1944
- 639th Bombardment Squadron (Dive): 5 April–15 August 1943

Support Units

- 408th USAF Infirmary (later 408th USAF Dispensary), 8 April 1956 – 1 October 1970
- 408th Air Base Squadron (later 408th Combat Support Squadron), 8 April 1956 – 1 October 1970
- 408th Consolidated Aircraft Maintenance Squadron, 8 November 1958 – 1 October 1970
- 408th Materiel Squadron, 8 April 1956 – 1 April 1964
- 408th Supply Squadron, 1 April 1964 – 1 October 1970
- 671st Armament Systems Squadron, 1 June 2009 – 30 June 2010
- 675th Armament Systems Squadron, 7 September 2007 – 30 June 2010
- 680th Armament Systems Squadron, 7 September 2007 – 30 June 2010
- 683d Armament Systems Squadron, 15 May 2006 – 7 September 2007
- 684th Armament Systems Squadron, 15 May 2006 – 7 September 2007
- 685th Armament Systems Squadron, 15 May 2006 – 7 September 2007
- 686th Armament Systems Squadron, 15 May 2006 – 30 June 2010
- 690th Armament Systems Squadron, 7 September 2007 – 30 June 2010
- 694th Armament Systems Squadron, 7 September 2007 – 30 June 2010

=== Stations ===
- Key Field, Mississippi, 5 April 1943
- Drew Field, Florida, 22 September 1943
- Abilene Army Air Field, Texas, 20 November 1943
- DeRidder Army Air Base, Louisiana, 12 February 1944
- Woodward Army Air Field, Oklahoma, 26 March 1944 – 1 April 1944
- Klamath Falls Municipal Airport (later Kingsley Field), Oregon, 8 April 1956 – 1 January 1970
- Eglin Air Force Base, Florida, 27 January 2005 – 20 June 2010

=== Aircraft ===
- Douglas A-24 Banshee, 1943–1944
- North American A-36 Apache, 1943–1944 (Note: Maurer, Combat Units says A-26 However, it seems likely that this is a typographical error since the A-26 was a light bomber, not a dive bomber, and Maurer, Combat Squadrons entries for the group's squadrons list them as equipped with the A-36.)
- Bell P-39 Airacobra, 1943–1944
- Curtiss P-40 Warhawk, 1943–1944
- Republic P-47 Thunderbolt, 1943–1944
- Cessna C-78 Bobcat, 1943–1944
- North American F-86D Sabre (authorized but not assigned 1956–1959)
- McDonnell F-101B Voodoo 1959–1969
- Convair F-106A Delta Dart 1969–1970

=== Awards and campaigns ===
Award streamer	Award	Dates	Notes
	Air Force Outstanding Unit Award	8 June 1960 – 30 April 1962	408th Fighter Group
	Air Force Outstanding Unit Award	1 July 1966 – 1 June 1968	408th Fighter Group
	Air Force Outstanding Unit Award	1 July 1968 – 30 June 1969	408th Fighter Group
	Air Force Outstanding Unit Award	1 July 1969 – 30 June 1970	408th Fighter Group
	Air Force Outstanding Unit Award	22 March 2008 – 5 June 2009	408th Armament Systems Group

Campaign Streamer	Campaign	Dates	Notes
	American Theater	7 December 1941 – 1 April 1944	408th Fighter Group
