= First Air Force =

US Air Force formation

First Air Force (Air Forces Northern and Air Forces Space)
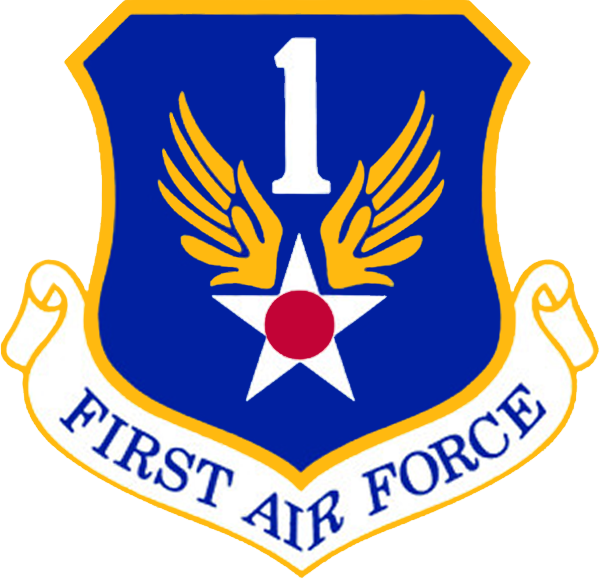
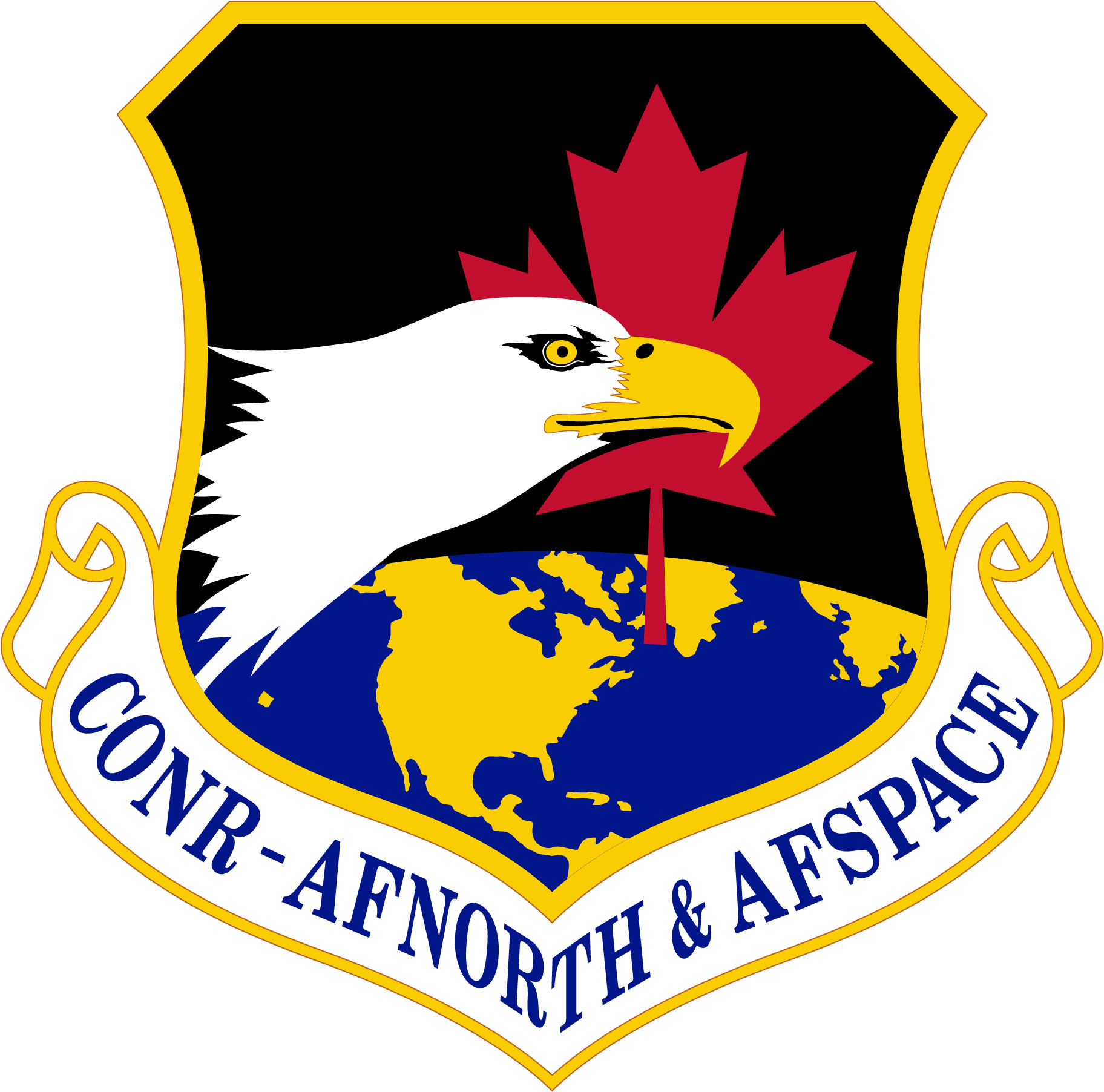
- Shield of the First Air Force Shield of Continental NORAD Region - Air Forces Northern and Air Forces Space
- Active: 1 November 2007 - present (as First Air Force (Air Forces Northern)); 1 October 1995 – 1 November 2007 (as First Air Force (ANG)); 6 December 1985 – 1 October 1995; 20 January 1966 – 31 December 1969; 18 September 1942 – 23 June 1958 (as First Air Force); 26 March 1941 – 18 September 1942 (as 1 Air Force); 19 October 1940 – 26 March 1941 (as Northeast Air District) (86 years)
- Country: United States
- Branch: United States Air Force (18 September 1947 - present); United States Army ( Army Air Forces, 20 June 1941 – 18 September 1947; Army Air Corps 19 October 1940 – 20 June 1941)
- Type: Numbered Air Force
- Role: Provide forces for Air defense of the Continental United States and serve as the air component for U.S. Northern Command and the Continental NORAD Region; As Air Forces Space (AFSPACE), provide Air Force contribution to US Space Command (USSPACECOM), including support of NASA human space flight
- Size: 15,000 Airmen
- Part of: Air Combat Command; United States Northern Command; Continental NORAD Region
- Headquarters: Tyndall Air Force Base, Florida, U.S.
- Engagements: World War II - American Theater

- Decorations: Air Force Outstanding Unit Award
- Website: 1af.acc.af.mil

Commanders
- Commander: Lt Gen Bradford R. Everman
- Deputy Commander: MGen Sean T. Boyle, RCAF
- Vice Commander: Brig Gen Daniel C. Clayton
- Command Chief: CMSgt Denny L. Richardson
- Notable commanders: Glenn O. Barcus

The First Air Force (Air Forces Northern & Air Forces Space; 1 AF-AFNORTH & AFSPACE) is a numbered air force of the U.S. Air Force Air Combat Command (ACC). It is headquartered at Tyndall Air Force Base, Florida. Its primary mission is the air defense of the Contiguous United States (CONUS), United States Virgin Islands and Puerto Rico. Since May 2022, it also provides the Air Force contribution to United States Space Command, as Air Forces Space (AFSPACE), including support functions for NASA human space flight.

It was one of the four original numbered air forces formed in the first years of World War II. It was activated as the Northeast Air District on 18 December 1940, at Mitchel Field, Long Island, New York with a mission of air defense of the Northeastern United States and Great Lakes regions. Its primary mission was the organization and training of new combat units prior to their deployment overseas. It was active in 1941–42; 1942–58; 1966–69; and with minor name and function changes from 1985 to the present.

First Air Force is commanded by Lieutenant General Bradford R. Everman. Its Command Chief Master Sergeant is Chief Master Sgt. Denny L. Richardson.

It has the responsibility for ensuring the air sovereignty and air defense of the Contiguous United States (CONUS), United States Virgin Islands and Puerto Rico. As the CONUS NORAD Region (CONR) for North American Aerospace Defense Command, CONR provides air defense in the form of airspace surveillance and airspace control. 1AF (AFNORTH) is also the designated air component for the United States Northern Command (USNORTHCOM). USNORTHCOM's area of responsibility includes the continental United States, Canada, and Mexico, and its air, land and maritime approaches.

With the transfer of responsibility for continental air defense from the active duty component of the Air Force to the Air National Guard, 1 AF became the first numbered air force to be made up primarily of citizen airmen. Furthermore, 1AF now has operational control (OPCON) of the Civil Air Patrol.

== History ==
One of the four original numbered air forces, First Air Force was activated as the Northeast Air District of the GHQ Air Force on 18 December 1940, at Mitchel Field, Long Island, New York. It was redesignated First Air Force on 9 April 1941 with a mission for the defense of the Northeast and Great Lakes regions of the United States.

=== World War II ===
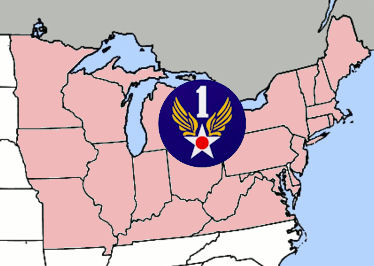
First Air Force region of the United States, World War II

During the initial months after the Pearl Harbor Attack, First Air Force organized what would eventually become the core of the Army Air Forces Antisubmarine Command (AAFSC), obtaining most of its forces from I Bomber Command to combat the German U-boat threat along the Atlantic Coast. AAFSC would eventually expand that mission to the Gulf of Mexico and Caribbean until the antisubmarine mission was taken over completely by the Navy in mid-1943.

Beginning in May 1942, the mission of First Air Force became operational training of units and crews, and the replacement training of individuals for bombardment, fighter, and reconnaissance operations. It received graduates of Army Air Forces Training Command flight schools; navigator training; flexible gunnery schools and various technical schools, organized them into newly activated combat groups and squadrons, and provided operational unit training (OTU) and replacement training (RTU) to prepare groups and replacements for deployment overseas to combat theaters. The First Air Force became predominantly a fighter OTU and RTU organization. Most P-47 Thunderbolt fighter groups were trained by I Fighter Command, along with P-39/P-63 Airacobra groups; C-47 Skytrain and later C-46 Commando groups by I Troop Carrier Command. By 1944, most of the Operational Training of groups ended, with the command concentrating on the training of individual replacements using Army Air Force Base Units (AAFBU) as training organizations at the airfields controlled by First Air Force.

Air Defense Wings were also organized for the major metropolitan areas along the northeast coast, using training units attached to the Wings. By 1944 the likelihood of an air attack along the eastern seaboard was remote, and these air defense wings were reduced to paper units.

By 1944, the vast majority of the USAAF was engaged in combat operations in various parts of the world, such as the Eighth Air Force in Europe and the Twentieth Air Force in the Pacific. The training units located within the United States (known as the Zone of the Interior, or "ZI".) under First, Second, Third and Fourth Air Force were all placed under the unified command of the Continental Air Forces (CAF) on 13 December 1944, with the Numbered Air Forces becoming subordinate commands of CAF.

=== Air Defense Command ===
In March 1946, USAAF Chief General Carl Spaatz had undertaken a major re-organization of the postwar USAAF that had included the establishment of Major Commands (MAJCOM), who would report directly to HQ United States Army Air Forces. Continental Air Forces was inactivated, and First Air Force was assigned to the postwar Air Defense Command in March 1946 and subsequently to Continental Air Command (ConAC) in December 1948 being primarily concerned with air defense. First Air Force Headquarters was located at Fort Slocum, New York, from 1946 to 1949.

The command was originally assigned the region of the New England states, along with New York and New Jersey. With the inactivation of the ADC Eleventh Air Force on 1 July 1948 due to budget restrictions, command's region of responsibility was increased to include the upper Midwest states of Michigan and Ohio, along with the Mid-Atlantic region south to the North Carolina/Virginia Border.

In 1949 Air National Guard and Air Force Reserve units were placed under First Air Force command, with its active-duty units being reassigned to Eastern Air Defense Force (EADF) or to the 30th, 32d or 26th Air Divisions. The command was inactivated on 23 June 1958 for budgetary reasons, its assigned units being placed under ConAC.

First Air Force was reactivated at Stewart Air Force Base, Newburgh, N.Y., on 20 January 1966 due to the inactivation of the ADC Air Defense Sectors. First Air Force assumed responsibility for the ADC 21st, 33d, 34th, 35th, and 36th Air Divisions, primarily located in the northeast and upper Midwest regions of the United States. It also was responsible for the air defense of Greenland, Iceland and parts of Canada. By July 1968, First Air Force had again assumed total responsibility for the air defense of the eastern seaboard, just as it had during World War II.

On 16 January 1968 Air Defense Command was re-designated Aerospace Defense Command (ADCOM) as part of a restructuring of USAF air defense forces. First Air Force's second period of service was short lived, however, and the command was again inactivated as the result of a major ADCOM reorganization on 31 December 1969 of the First, Fourth, Tenth Air Forces and several Air Divisions. This reorganization was the result of the need to eliminate intermediate levels of command in ADCOM driven by budget reductions and a perceived lessening of the need for continental air defense against attacking Soviet aircraft.

ADCOM reassigned the units under the inactivated First Air Force were reassigned primarily to the 20th, 21st or 23d Air Divisions.

=== Tactical Air Command ===
ADCOM was reorganized on 1 October 1979. The interceptors and warning radars were reassigned to Tactical Air Command (TAC). With this move many Air National Guard units that had an air defense mission also came under the control of TAC, which established a component called Air Defense, Tactical Air Command (ADTAC), at the level of a numbered air force.

On 6 December 1985 HQ USAF reactivated First Air Force at Langley Air Force Base, Virginia, and assigned it to Tactical Air Command (TAC), replacing ADTAC. First Air Force was given the mission to provide, train and equip combat ready air defence forces for the air defense of the North American continent.

Upon its reactivation, First Air Force was composed of units of the active Air Force and the Air National Guard. Because of its unique mission and its binational responsibilities, First Air Force works closely with the Canadian Forces. Canadian personnel are stationed at First Air Force Headquarters at Tyndall Air Force Base Florida, and at the various regional air defense sectors located throughout the United States.

Activation of the Continental NORAD Region on 1 October 1986, resulted in a new structure for North American Aerospace Defense Command (NORAD). The Continental NORAD Region, along with the Alaskan and Canadian regions, commanded North American air defense forces.

- On 1 July 1987, four of the previous Air Defense Command Air Defense sectors were reactivated, re-designated, assigned and co-located with the four remaining air divisions.

The Montgomery Air Defense Sector (MOADS, Inactivated 1966) was reactivated as the Southeast Air Defense Sector (SEADS); assigned to 23d Air Division

23d Air Division inactivated 4 July 1987; assets transferred to SEADS.

The Los Angeles Air Defense Sector (LAADS, Inactivated 1966) was reactivated as the Southwest Air Defense Sector (SWADS); assigned to 26th Air Division

26th Air Division inactivated 30 September 1990; assets transferred to SWADS.

The Seattle Air Defense Sector (SEADS, Inactivated 1966) was reactivated as the Northwest Air Defense Sector (NWADS); assigned to 25th Air Division

25th Air Division inactivated 30 September 1990; assets transferred to NWADS.

The New York Air Defense Sector (NYADS, Inactivated 1966) was reactivated as the Northeast Air Defense Sector (NEADS); assigned to 24th Air Division.

24th Air Division inactivated 30 September 1990; assets transferred to NEADS.

The Air Defense Sectors were transferred by the Air Force to the National Guard Bureau and allotted to the Air National Guard on 1 October 1990. They were operationally gained by First Air Force, Tactical Air Command.

- SEADS became part of the Florida ANG at Tyndall AFB
- SWADS became part of the California ANG at March AFB
- NWADS became part of the Washington ANG at McChord AFB
- NEADS became part of the New York ANG at Griffiss AFB

First Air Force was transferred to Air Combat Command along with the rest of TAC on 1 June 1992.

=== Air Combat Command ===
In the years since its third activation, more of the responsibility for the defense of American air sovereignty has primarily shifted to the Air National Guard. Also, reorganization of the command structure of the U.S. Air Force saw the assignment of air defense to Tactical Air Command and later, its successor, Air Combat Command.

In the 1970s and 1980s, the role of the Air National Guard in the defense of North America increased. As this role changed, discussions between the active Air Force and the Air National Guard commenced concerning roles and responsibilities.

As the Cold War began to wind down and budgetary constraints became realities, more and more of the missions previously carried out by active duty forces began to be transferred into the reserve components. By the 1990s, 90 percent of the air defense mission was being handled by the Air National Guard.

In October 1997, First Air Force became primarily composed of Air National Guard units charged with the air defense of the North American continent. Today, First Air Force consists primarily of members of the Air National Guard. Its headquarters is located at Tyndall Air Force Base, Florida and it comprises 9 fighter wings, 1 composite wing with a fighter mission, and two air defense sectors for the Eastern and Western regions of the continental United States (CONUS).

== Units ==
=== Units circa 2022 ===
- Eastern Air Defense Sector (EADS), former Griffiss AFB, Rome, New York
- Western Air Defense Sector (WADS), JB Lewis–McChord (formerly McChord AFB), Washington
- 601st Air and Space Operations Center (601 AOC), Tyndall AFB, Florida
- Air Force Rescue Coordination Center (AFRCC), Tyndall AFB, Florida
- Air Force National Security Emergency Preparedness Agency (AFNSEP), Tyndall AFB, Florida
- 1 AF Detachment 1, CFB Winnipeg, Manitoba, Canada
- 2 AF Detachment 2, CFB North Bay, Ontario, Canada
- Air Force Element, Joint Air Defense Operations Center (AFELM JADOC), JB Anacostia-Bolling (formerly Bolling AFB, District of Columbia

Additionally, First Air Force provides operational control of alert Air National Guard air defense fighter units and supporting non-flying units:

- 104th Fighter Wing (104 FW), Westfield-Barnes RAP / Barnes ANGB, Massachusetts F-15 Eagle

Detachment 1, 104 FW, JB Langley–Eustis (formerly Langley AFB), Virginia

- 113th Wing (113 WG), Joint Base Andrews (formerly Andrews AFB), Maryland F-16 Fighting Falcon
- 125th Fighter Wing (125 FW), Jacksonville IAP / Jacksonville ANGB, Florida, F-15 Eagle

Detachment 1 (OL-A), 125 FW, Homestead ARB (formerly Homestead AFB), Florida

- 127th Wing (127 WG), Selfridge Air National Guard Base | Selfridge ANGB A-10 Thunderbolt II scheduled to receive its F-15EX Eagle II fighter jets in 2028
- 138th Fighter Wing (138 FW), Tulsa IAP / Tulsa ANGB, Oklahoma F-16 Fighting Falcon

Detachment 1, 138 FW, Ellington Field JRB, Texas

- 142d Fighter Wing (142 FW), Portland IAP / Portland ANGB, Oregon, F-15 Eagle
- 144th Fighter Wing (144 FW), Fresno Yosemite IAP / Fresno ANGB California, F-15 Eagle

Detachment 1, 144 FW, March ARB (formerly March AFB), California

- 148th Fighter Wing (148 FW), Duluth IAP / Duluth ANGB, Minnesota, F-16 Fighting Falcon
- 158th Fighter Wing (158 FW), Burlington IAP / Burlington ANGB, Vermont, F-35 Lightning II
- 159th Fighter Wing (159 FW), NAS JRB New Orleans, Louisiana, F-15 Eagle
- 177th Fighter Wing (177 FW), Atlantic City IAP / Atlantic City ANGB, New Jersey, F-16 Fighting Falcon
- 180 Fighter Wing (180 FW), Toledo Express IAP / Toledo ANGB, Ohio, F-16 Fighting Falcon

Non-flying units

- 101st Air and Space Operations Group (101 AOG), Tyndall AFB, Florida
- 101st Information Operations Flight (101 IOF), Salt Lake City IAP / Roland R. Wright ANGB, Utah
- 254th Combat Communications Group, Hensley Field (formerly NAS Dallas), Garland, Texas

Auxiliary units

- Civil Air Patrol, Maxwell AFB, Alabama

Also, First Air Force has operational control of the Civil Air Patrol, the USAF Auxiliary. Administrative control of CAP, to include its Regular Air Force & Air Force Reserve CAP-USAF liaison support components, remains with Air University at Maxwell AFB.

=== New space-related responsibilities, 2021 ===
On July 15, 2021, First Air Force, now AFSPACE, assumed the operational command and control of the Human Space Flight Support (HSFS) mission, previously carried out by the Combined Force Space Component Command at Vandenberg Space Force Base, California. This mission is executed by its assigned Detachment 3, First Air Force, based at Patrick Space Force Base, Florida.

Detachment 3, formerly commanded by Space Launch Delta 45, came under First Air Force control during a redesignation and change of command ceremony held at Cape Canaveral Space Force Station, Florida, that day. Air Force Lt. Gen. Kirk Pierce, commander, First Air Force, Continental U.S. NORAD Region, AFNORTH, and now AFSPACE, said First Air Force responsibilities now included '..to plan, train and execute worldwide rescue and recovery of NASA astronauts during contingency operations.'

== Lineage ==
- Established as Northeast Air District on 19 October 1940

Activated on 18 December 1940.
Re-designated: 1 Air Force on 26 March 1941
Re-designated: First Air Force on 18 September 1942
Discontinued on 23 June 1958

- Activated on 20 January 1966

Organized on 1 April 1966
Inactivated on 31 December 1969

- Activated on 6 December 1985, assuming assets of Air Defense, Tactical Air Command (Inactivated)

Re-designated First Air Force (ANG) on 1 October 1995
Re-designated First Air Force (Air Forces Northern) on 1 November 2007.

== Assignments ==
- General Headquarters Air Force (later, Air Force Combat Command), 18 Dec 1940
- Eastern Theater of Operations (later, Eastern Defense Command), 24 Dec 1941
- United States Army Air Forces, 17 Sep 1943
- Continental Air Forces, 16 Apr 1945
- Air Defense Command, 21 Mar 1946
- Continental Air Command, 1 Dec 1948 – 23 Jun 1958
- Air (later, Aerospace) Defense Command, 20 Jan 1966 – 31 Dec 1969
- Tactical Air Command, later Air Combat Command, 6 Dec 1985 - present.

== Major components ==
- 15th Tactical Reconnaissance Squadron: 3 February 1946.
- 1st Sea-Search Attack Group (Medium): November 1943–10 April 1944.

=== Commands ===
- 1 Air Force Service (later, 1 Air Force Base; 1 Base): 1 October 1941 – 13 May 1942
- 1 Air Support (later, I Air Support; I Ground Air Support) Command: 1 September 1941 – 17 August 1942
- 1 Bomber (later, I Bomber) Command: 5 September 1941 – 15 October 1942
- 1 Bomber Command: 24 August 1943 – 21 March 1946
- 1 Interceptor (later, I Interceptor; I Fighter) Command: 5 June 1941 – 21 March 1946
- XVI Air Force Service: 27 December 1946 – 1 April 1949
- XVII Air Force Service: 1 July 1948 – 23 February 1949
- XIX Air Force Service: 13 August 1948 – 23 February 1949.

=== Forces ===
- Air Forces Iceland: 6 December 1985 – 31 May 1993

=== Air Divisions ===
- 3d Air Division (formerly, 98 Bombardment Wing; 3 Bombardment Wing): 20 Dec 1946 – 27 Jun 1949
- 4th Air Division (formerly, 4 Combat Bombardment; 4 Bombardment Wing): 20 Dec 1946 – 27 Jun 1949
- 90th Air Division (formerly, 90 Reconnaissance Wing): 20 Dec 1946 – 27 Jun 1949
- 91st Air Division (formerly, 91 Reconnaissance Wing): 20 Dec 1946 – 27 Jun 1949
- 12th Air Division: 1 Jul 1948 – 23 Feb 1949
- 69th Air Division: 1 Jul 1948 – 23 Feb 1949
- 26th Air Defense (later, 26 Air) Division: 16 Nov 1948 – 1 Apr 1949; 16 Nov 1949 – 1 Sep 1950 (detached 8 Dec 1949 – 1 Sep 1950); 6 Dec 1985 – 30 Sep 1990
- 32d Air Division: 8 Dec 1949 – 1 Sep 1950 (detached 8 Dec 1949 – 19 Feb 1950); 1 Jul 1968 – 31 Dec 1969
- 21st Air Division: 1 Apr 1966 – 31 Dec 1967
- 33d Air Division: 1 Apr 1966 – 19 Nov 1969
- 34th Air Division: 1 Apr 1966 – 31 Dec 1969
- 35th Air Division: 1 Apr 1966 – 19 Nov 1969
- 36th Air Division: 1 Apr 1966 – 30 Sep 1969
- 37th Air Division: 1 Apr 1966 – 1 Dec 1969
- 29th Air Division: 15 September – 19 November 1969
- 23d Air Division: 19 November – 1 December 1969; 6 Dec 1985 – 1 Jul 1987
- 24th Air Division: 6 Dec 1985 – 30 Sep 1990
- 25th Air Division: 6 Dec 1985 – 30 Sep 1990

=== Districts ===
- 1 Air Reserve District: 1 Dec 1951 – 1 Apr 1954

=== Centers ===
- 1 Airborne Engineer Aviation Unit Training Center: 1 Apr 1943 – 10 Apr 1944
- Combined Air Defense Training Center: 4 Aug 1943 – 15 Jul 1944
- Eastern Signal Aviation Unit Training Center: 12 Mar 1943 – 12 Feb 1944
- USAF Air Defense Weapons Center: 6 Dec 1985 – 12 Sep 1991
- 601st Air and Space Operations Center: 1 Nov 2007 – present
- Air Force Rescue Coordination Center: 27 Apr 2007 – present
- Civil Air Patrol: 26 June 2016 – present

=== Sectors ===
- Northwest Air Defense Sector, 1 October 1990 – 31 December 1994
- Western Air Defense Sector, 1 January 1995–present
- Southeast Air Defense Sector, 1 October 1990 – 31 December 1994
- Southwest Air Defense Sector, 1 October 1990 – 31 December 1994

==== Wings and squadrons ====
- 551st Airborne Early Warning and Control Wing, 1 April 1966 – 4 December 1969
- 701st Air Operations Squadron, 1990 – 1 November 2007

== Stations ==
- Mitchel Field, New York, 18 December 1940
- Fort Slocum (later, Slocum AFB), New York, 3 June 1946
- Mitchel AFB, New York, 17 October 1949 – 23 June 1958
- Stewart AFB, New York, 1 April 1966 – 31 December 1969
- Langley AFB, Virginia, 6 December 1985
- Tyndall AFB, Florida, 12 September 1991–present

== List of commanders ==
| No. | Commander | | Term | | |
| No. | Portrait | Name | Took office | Left office | Term length |
|---|---|---|---|---|---|
| 1 | Henry C. Morrow | Major General; Henry C. Morrow | 1 November 2007 | 12 November 2009 | 2 years, 11 days |
| 2 | Garry C. Dean | Major General; Garry C. Dean | 12 November 2009 | 31 August 2011 | 1 year, 292 days |
| 3 | Stanley E. Clarke III | Lieutenant General; Stanley E. Clarke III | 31 August 2011 | 7 March 2013 | 1 year, 188 days |
| 4 | William H. Etter | Lieutenant General; William H. Etter | 7 March 2013 | 11 July 2016 | 3 years, 126 days |
| 5 | R. Scott Williams | Lieutenant General; R. Scott Williams | 11 July 2016 | 20 June 2019 | 2 years, 344 days |
| 6 | Marc H. Sasseville | Lieutenant General; Marc H. Sasseville | 20 June 2019 | 29 July 2020 | 1 year, 39 days |
| 7 | Kirk S. Pierce | Lieutenant General; Kirk S. Pierce | 29 July 2020 | 31 March 2023 | 2 years, 245 days |
| 8 | Steven S. Nordhaus | Lieutenant General; Steven S. Nordhaus | 31 March 2023 | 2 October 2024 | 1 year, 185 days |
| 9 | M. Luke Ahmann | Lieutenant General; M. Luke Ahmann | 2 October 2024 | 2 September 2026 | 1 year, 335 days |
| 10 | Bradford R. Everman | Lieutenant General; Bradford R. Everman | 2 September 2026 | Incumbent | 71 days |

== See also ==
- Airfields of the United States Army Air Forces First Air Force

== Sources ==
- CONR-1AF (13 May 2022). "First Air Force supports US Space Command as 'Air Forces Space'". Air Force.
- Maurer, Maurer (1983). Air Force Combat Units of World War II. Maxwell AFB, Alabama: Office of Air Force History. ISBN 0-89201-092-4.
- Ravenstein, Charles A. (1984). Air Force Combat Wings Lineage and Honors Histories 1947–1977. Maxwell AFB, Alabama: Office of Air Force History. ISBN 0-912799-12-9.
- A Handbook of Aerospace Defense Organization 1946 – 1980, by Lloyd H. Cornett and Mildred W. Johnson, Office of History, Aerospace Defense Center, Peterson Air Force Base, Colorado
