= 518th Fighter-Interceptor Squadron =

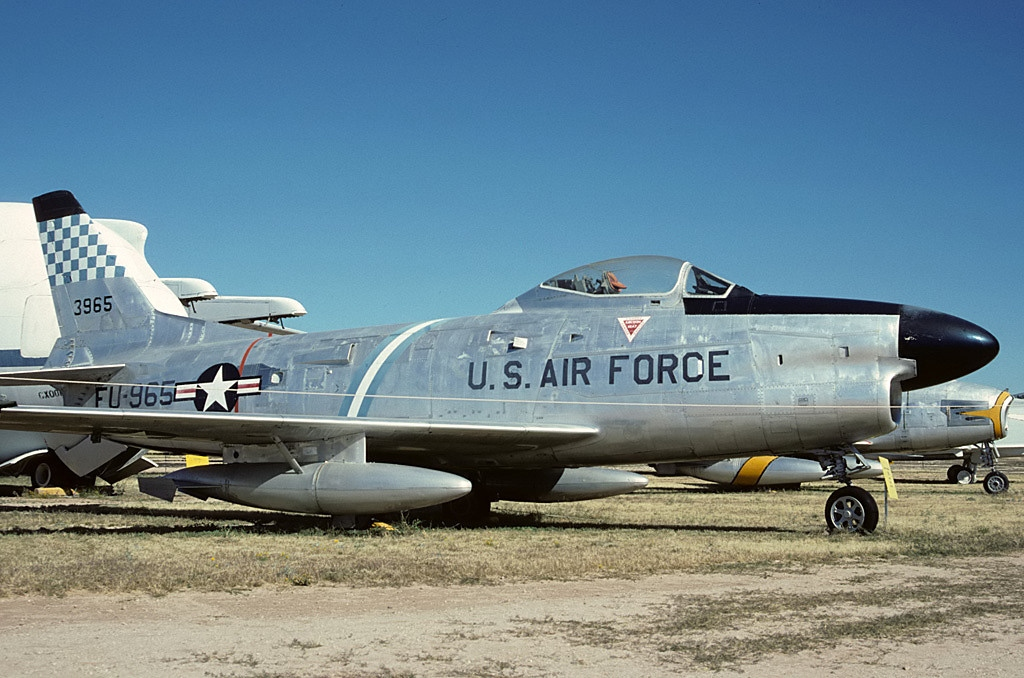
- F-86D Sabre as flown by the squadron
- Active: 1943–1944; 1955; 1956–1959
- Country: United States
- Branch: United States Air Force
- Role: Fighter-Interceptor
- Part of: Air Defense Command

Insignia
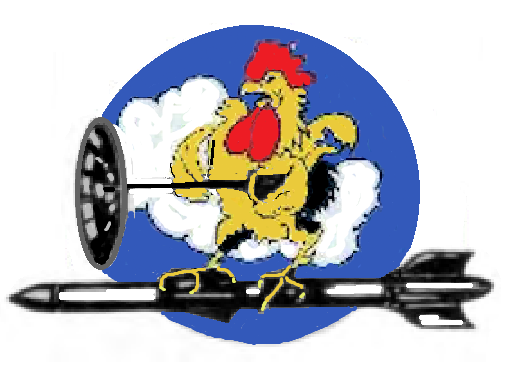
- 518th Fighter-Interceptor Squadron emblem (Note: Approved 18 January 1957. Description: Over and through a medium blue disc, a caricatured light golden brown gamecock, with black tail feathers, red comb and wattles, white eyeball and talons, and black outline, standing on a large black guided missile, highlights white and gray, and holding a black radar antenna, highlights white and gray, braced under his left wing, all in front of a large white cloud formation.)

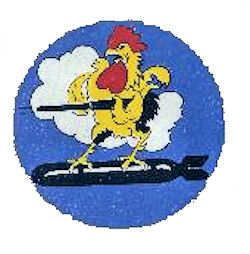
- 518th Fighter-Bomber Squadron emblem

The 518th Fighter-Interceptor Squadron is an inactive United States Air Force unit. Its last assignment was with Air Defense Command's 408th Fighter Group at Klamath Falls Airport, Oregon, where it was inactivated on 1 July 1959. The squadron was first activated during World War II as a dive bomber unit, but was disbanded before participating in combat in a general reorganization of Army Air Forces training units. It was reconstituted during the Cold War as a fighter interceptor unit supporting the air defense of the United States.

== World War II ==
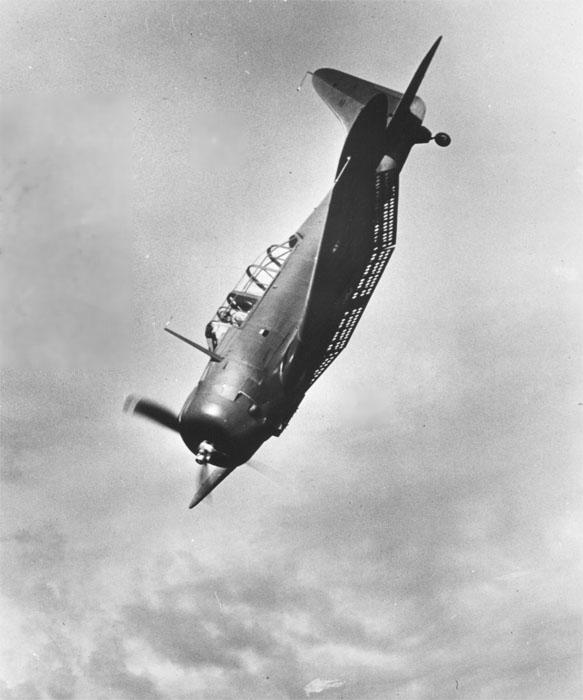
A-24 diving

The squadron was activated in April 1943 as the 636th Bombardment Squadron at Key Field, Mississippi, as one of the original squadrons of the 408th Bombardment Group. In August, along with other Army Air Forces (AAF) single engine dive bomber units, it became a fighter-bomber unit, and was redesignated as the 518th Fighter-Bomber Squadron. The squadron did not receive aircraft to begin training until October, after it had moved to Drew Field, Florida. It served as an operational training unit with various aircraft, providing cadres to "satellite groups" and as a replacement training unit, training individual pilots.

However, the AAF was finding that standard military units, based on relatively inflexible tables of organization, were not proving well adapted to the training mission. Accordingly, it adopted a more functional system in which each AAF base was organized into a separate numbered unit. In this reorganization the squadron was disbanded in 1944 as the AAF converted to the AAF Base Unit system. It was replaced, along with other units at Woodward Army Air Field, by the 267th AAF Base Unit (Combat Crew Training Station, Fighter) in a reorganization of the AAF in which all units not programmed for deployment overseas were replaced by AAF Base Units to free up manpower for assignment overseas.

== Cold War air defense ==
During the Cold War the squadron was reconstituted, redesignated as the 518th Fighter-Interceptor Squadron and activated at George Air Force Base, California in January 1955, where it was assigned to the 27th Air Division. At George, the squadron flew airborne intercept radar equipped and Mighty Mouse rocket armed North American F-86D Sabre aircraft. The squadron was inactivated and replaced by the 329th Fighter-Interceptor Squadron in 1955 as part of Air Defense Command's Project Arrow, which was designed to reestablish the fighter units that had compiled memorable records in the two world wars. The squadron was again active at Klamath Falls Airport, Oregon from 1956 to 1959.

== Lineage ==
- Constituted as the 636th Bombardment Squadron (Dive) on 23 March 1943

Activated on 5 April 1943
Redesignated 518th Fighter-Bomber Squadron on 10 August 1943
Disbanded on 1 April 1944

- Reconstituted and redesignated 518th Fighter-Interceptor Squadron on 4 November 1954

Activated on 8 January 1955
Inactivated on 18 August 1955

- Activated on 8 June 1956

Inactivated on 1 July 1959

=== Assignments ===
- 408th Bombardment Group (later 408th Fighter-Bomber Group), 5 April 1943 – 1 April 1944
- 27th Air Division, 8 January – 18 August 1955
- 408th Fighter Group, 8 June 1956 – 1 July 1959

=== Stations ===
- Key Field, Mississippi, 5 April 1943
- Drew Field, Florida, 22 September 1943
- Abilene Army Air Field, Texas, 10 November 1943
- DeRidder Army Air Base, Louisiana, 12 February 1944
- Woodward Army Air Field, Oklahoma, 24 March – 1 April 1944
- George Air Force Base, California, 8 January – 18 August 1955
- Klamath Falls Airport, Oregon, 8 June 1956 – 1 July 1959

=== Aircraft ===
- Douglas A-24 Banshee, 1943–1944
- North American A-36 Apache, 1943–1944
- Curtiss P-40 Warhawk, 1943–1944
- Republic P-47 Thunderbolt, 1943–1944
- Cessna UC-78, 1943–1944
- North American F-86D Sabre, 1955
