= William H. Etter =

US Air Force officer (born c. 1957)

Lieutenant General William H. Etter
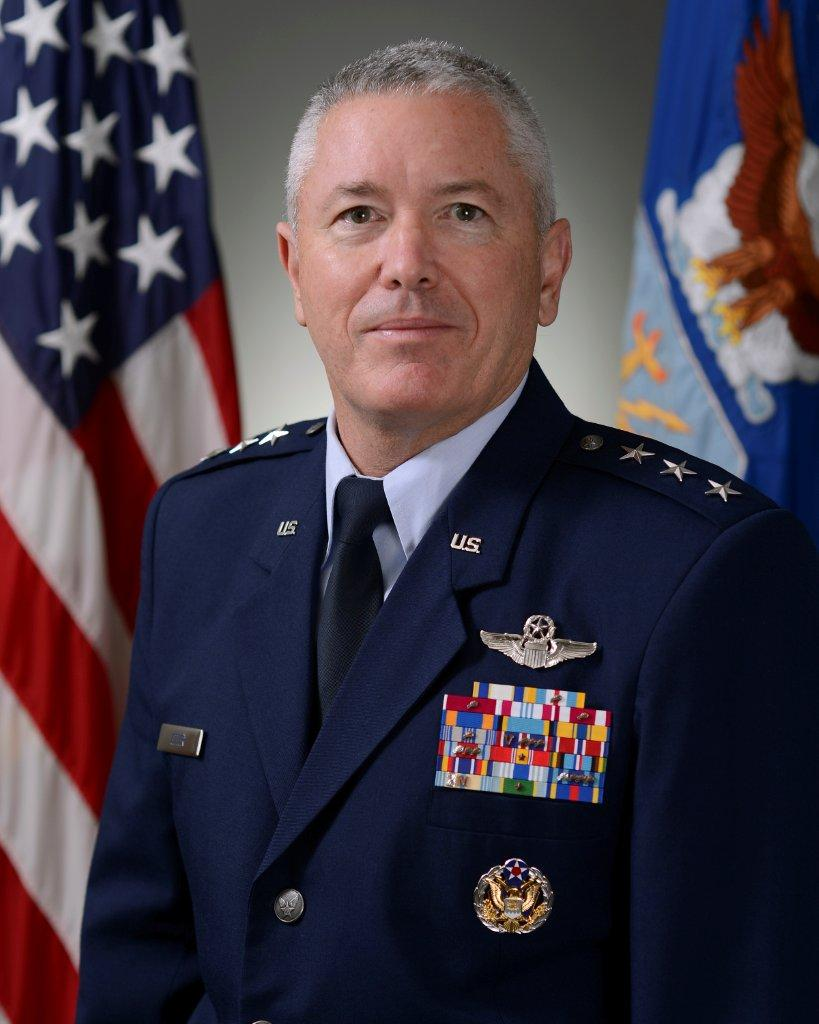
- Lieutenant General William H. Etter, USAF, c. 2013
- Born: c. 1957 (age 68–69)
- Education: University of Connecticut (BS); Troy University (MS)
- Military career
- Allegiance: United States
- Branch: United States Air Force
- Service years: 1979–2016
- Rank: Lieutenant general
- Commands: 1st Air Force; 158th Operations Group; 134th Fighter Squadron
- Awards: Air Force Distinguished Service Medal; Defense Superior Service Medal (2); Legion of Merit (2); Defense Meritorious Service Medal; Meritorious Service Medal (2); Air Medal; Aerial Achievement Medal; Air Force Commendation Medal; Air Force Achievement Medal (2)

Lieutenant General William H. Etter is a retired United States Air Force officer who last served as commander of 1st Air Force (Air Force North) and commander of Continental North American Aerospace Defense Command Region, from March 2013 to August 2016.

Etter earned his commission through the Air Force ROTC program at the University of Connecticut. He has served in various operational, command and staff assignments as an F-16 pilot. Etter served as director of operations and assistant adjutant general-air for the Vermont Air National Guard before transferring to the Connecticut Air National Guard.

Upon moving to the National Guard Bureau, Etter served in many positions, including director of strategic plans and policy (J5), director Joint Staff of National Guard Bureau, director of domestic operations (J3), director of domestic operations/force development (J3/7) and the deputy director of the Air National Guard. Prior to his current assignment, he was the assistant to the chairman, Joint Chiefs of Staff, for National Guard matters at the Pentagon.

Etter is a command pilot with more than 3,700 military flight hours, primarily in the T-37 Tweet, T-38 Talon, and F-16 Fighting Falcon. Additionally, Etter has more than 11,300 commercial flight hours, primarily in the Boeing 737, 757, and 767.

== Education ==
- 1979 Bachelor of Science, mechanical engineering, University of Connecticut, summa cum laude
- 1984 Master of Science, management, Troy State University, Troy, Alabama
- 1996 Air War College, by correspondence
- 2005 Senior Executives in International Security, John F. Kennedy School, Harvard University, Cambridge, Massachusetts
- 2006 Dual Status Title 10/32 Joint Task Force Commanders Course, Norfolk, Virginia
- 2007 Leading Organizational Change, the Wharton School of Business, University of Pennsylvania, Philadelphia
- 2009 Combined Force Air Component Commander (CFACC) Course, Maxwell AFB, Alabama
- 2009 Capstone General and Flag Officer Course, National Defense University, Fort Lesley J. McNair, Washington, D.C.
- 2011 Senior Executive Seminar, George C. Marshall European Center for Security Studies, Garmisch, Germany
- 2014 Pinnacle General and Flag Officer Course, National Defense University, Fort Lesley J. McNair, Washington, D.C.

== Military assignments ==
- February 1980 – February 1981, student, undergraduate pilot training, Columbus AFB, Mississippi
- February 1981 – June 1981, student, fighter lead-in training, Holloman AFB, New Mexico
- June 1981- February 1982, student, F-16 Initial Replacement Training Unit, MacDill AFB, Florida
- February 1982 – July 1985, pilot, instructor pilot and Standardization Evaluation Examiner, F-16, 496th Fighter Squadron, Hahn Air Base, Germany
- July 1985 – September 1985, student, Tactical Air Command Instructor Pilot Course, F-16, MacDill AFB, Florida
- September 1985 – July 1987, instructor pilot and standardization evaluation flight examiner, F-16, 61st Tactical Fighter Squadron, MacDill AFB, Florida
- July 1987 – January 1993, instructor pilot and standardization evaluation flight examiner, F-16, 134th Fighter Squadron, Vermont Air National Guard, Burlington, Vermont
- January 1993 – August 1993, operations officer, F-16, 134th Fighter Squadron, Vermont Air National Guard, Burlington, Vermont
- August 1993 – April 1997, commander, 134th Fighter Squadron, Vermont Air National Guard, Burlington, Vermont
- April 1997 – November 2001, commander, 158th Operations Group, Burlington, Vermont
- November 2001- August 2003, director of operations, Headquarters Vermont Air National Guard, Colchester, Vermont
- August 2003 – August 2004, assistant adjutant general for air, Joint Force Headquarters Vermont National Guard, Colchester, Vermont
- August 2004 – January 2007, assistant adjutant general for air, Commander, Vermont Air National Guard, Colchester, Vermont (also served September 2006, Maple Tap Commander, Iraq)
- February 2007 – June 2008, director for strategic plans and policy (J5), National Guard Bureau, Arlington, Va.; also served January 2008 – June 2008, acting director, Joint Staff, National Guard Bureau, Arlington, Virginia
- July 2008 – March 2010, director for domestic operations (J3), National Guard Bureau, Arlington, Virginia
- April 2010 – November 2010, director for strategic plans and policy (J5), National Guard Bureau, Arlington, Va.; also served April 2010 – September 2010, acting director, Domestic Operations/Force Development (J3/7), Arlington, Virginia
- December 2010 – June 2012, deputy director, Air National Guard, the Pentagon, Washington, D.C.
- June 2012 – March 2013, assistant to the chairman, Joint Chiefs of Staff, for National Guard Matters, the Pentagon, Washington, D.C.
- March 2013 – August 2016, commander of 1st Air Force (Air Force North) and commander of Continental North American Aerospace Defense Command Region, Tyndall AFB, Florida

== Effective dates of promotion ==
Insignia	Rank	Date of rank
	Second lieutenant	May 20, 1979
	First lieutenant	May 20, 1981
	Captain	November 20, 1983
	Major	September 12, 1989
	Lieutenant colonel	October 3, 1993
	Colonel	March 30, 2000
	Brigadier general	January 28, 2004
	Major general	February 1, 2007
	Lieutenant general	March 7, 2013
