= West Coast Airlines Flight 720 =

1967 aviation accident

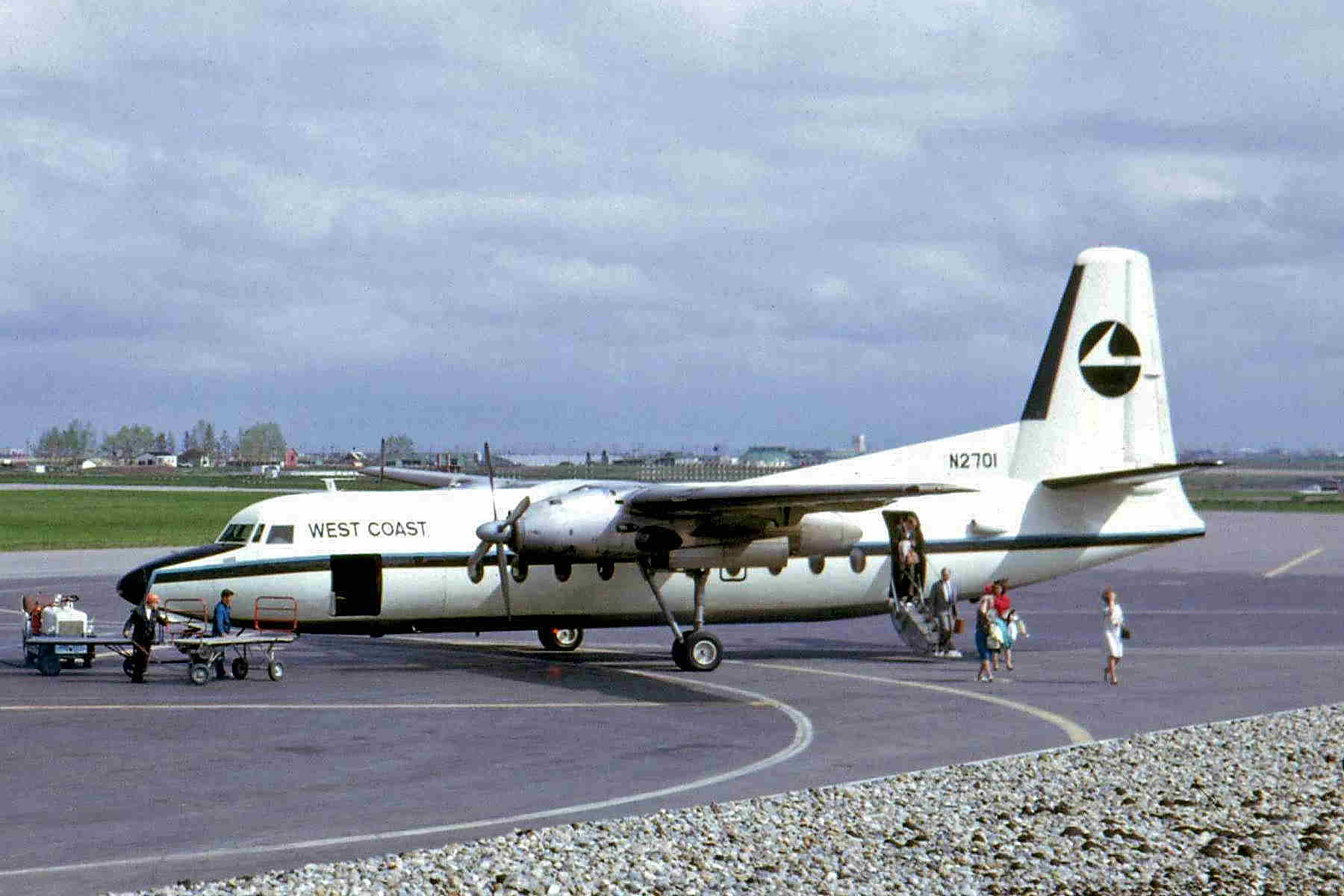
- Sister aircraft N2701 in 1967

Accident
- Date: March 10, 1967
- Summary: Icing
- Site: Stukel Mountain Klamath County, Oregon, U.S. near Klamath Falls Airport; 42°07′15″N 121°39′14″W

Aircraft
- Aircraft type: Fairchild F-27
- Operator: West Coast Airlines
- Registration: N2712
- Flight origin: Klamath Falls Airport; Klamath Falls, Oregon
- 1st stopover: Medford Airport; Medford, Oregon
- 2nd stopover: Eugene Airport; Eugene, Oregon
- Last stopover: Portland International Airport; Portland, Oregon
- Destination: Seattle-Tacoma International Airport, Seattle, Washington
- Occupants: 4
- Passengers: 1
- Crew: 3
- Fatalities: 4
- Survivors: 0

West Coast Airlines Flight 720 was a scheduled passenger flight in the northwest United States from Klamath Falls, Oregon to Seattle, Washington, with intermediate stops at Medford, Eugene and Portland, Oregon. On March 10, 1967, it crashed shortly after takeoff from Klamath Falls, killing all three crew members and the flight's lone passenger.

== Synopsis ==
West Coast Airlines Flight 720 was operated on Friday, March 10, 1967 by a Fairchild F-27 aircraft registered N2712 and built in 1960. That morning, the aircraft was parked in West Coast's hangar at Klamath Falls Airport for routine maintenance. Because of snowy conditions, instead of loading at the terminal, as was standard procedure, the aircraft was loaded in the hangar with the passenger and crew members. Both pilots performed a preflight check of the plane and reported nothing unusual.

After boarding was completed at 4:46 a.m. PST, the plane was pushed out of the hangar as snow, mixed with rain, was falling. During pushback, the tractor tug became immobilized in the snow. Ground personnel spent 11 minutes freeing it, and during this time, the airplane was exposed to the adverse weather conditions and no attempt was undertaken to clear the wings or control surfaces of snow. Once freed from the snow, the aircraft taxied to Runway 14 and was granted takeoff clearance at 4:57 a.m. The elevation of the airport is approximately 4,100 feet (1,250 m) above sea level.

The aircraft took off at 5:01 a.m., and at 5:02:43 the crew contacted the tower to confirm that the plane was visible via radar. This was the last communication from the aircraft. The controller replied to the crew that they were indeed visible via radar, and he then witnessed a target on his screen drift to the left of the runway centerline and head toward the 6,526-foot (1,989 m) Stukel Mountain, four miles (6 km) southeast of the airport. At 5:02:49, the flight impacted the mountain's northwest slope at an approximate elevation of 5,050 feet (1,540 m).

== Cause and investigation ==
At 5:09 a.m., a report reached the tower that an aircraft had crashed on Stukel Mountain. The runway tracks were observed in heavy snow, and the plane had swerved to the left on the runway before becoming airborne. By takeoff, the left gear was 12 feet (3.7 m) off the runway.

Several witnesses in the vicinity saw the airplane flying low and saw or heard a large explosion. All reported snow at the time of the crash.

The aircraft was equipped with a flight data recorder (FDR). Although the FDR was damaged in the crash, its recording medium could be read. The aircraft was reported to have climbed for approximately one minute after takeoff. Throughout the flight, the aircraft was recorded to have continued a turn to the left of the assigned heading. Shortly before impact, the aircraft began a sharp turn to the left, toward the mountain, at heading of 042 degrees.

The aircraft was equipped with a cockpit voice recorder (CVR). Although the device was damaged, the recording was intact. The crew reported a loss of control before impact and reported that they could not see the mountain. An expletive was uttered just before impact.

The aircraft was observed accumulating ice and snow on its control surfaces prior to takeoff and when moved out of the hangar. The investigation concluded that the failure of the crew to de-ice the plane was the cause of the accident. Given the crew's short turnaround schedule, fatigue was suggested as a contributing factor.
