= 26th Air Division =

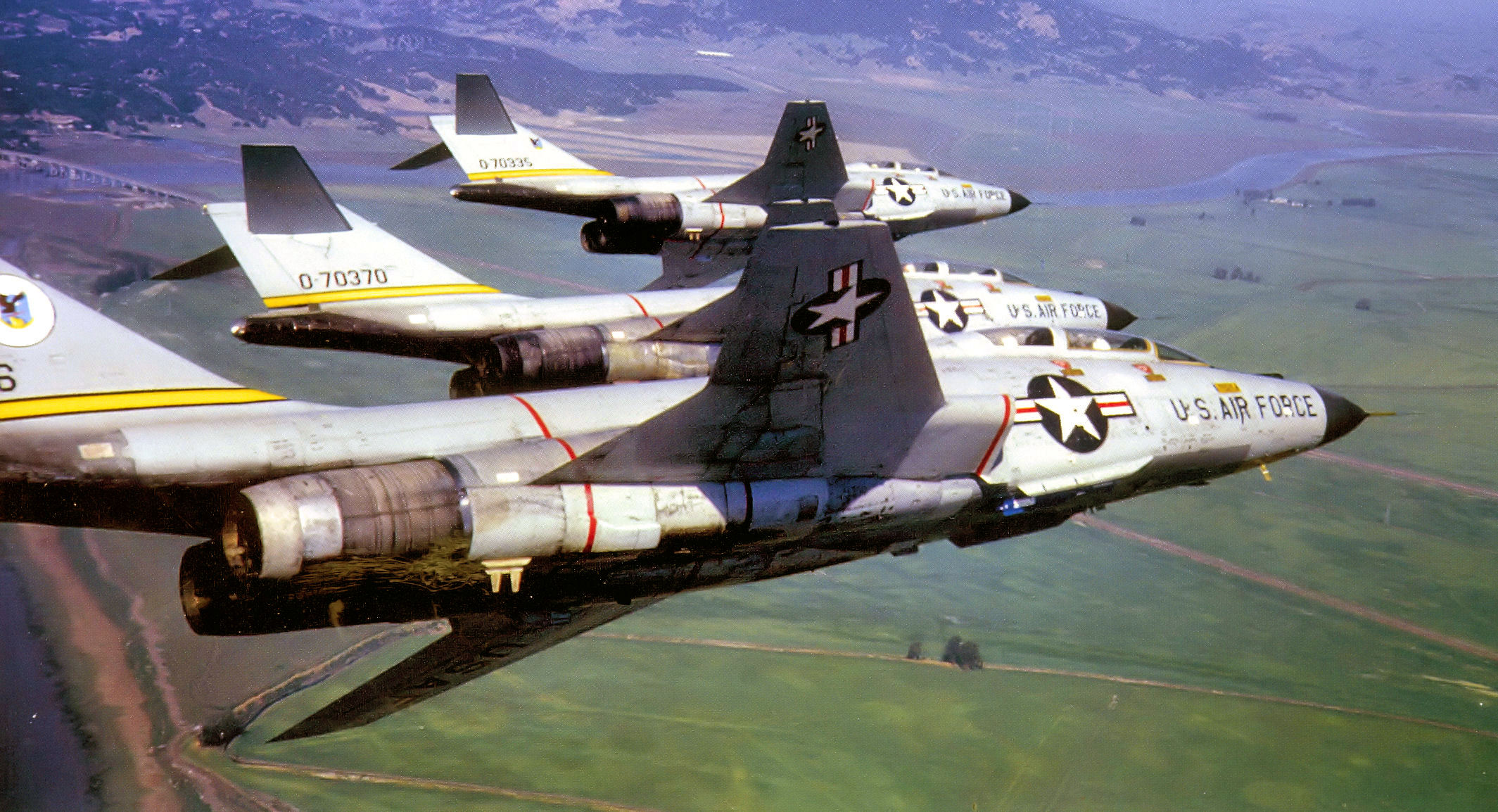
- 84th Fighter-Interceptor Squadron F-101B Voodoos
- Active: 1948–1952; 1952–1969; 1969–1990
- Country: United States
- Branch: United States Air Force
- Role: Command of air defense forces
- Part of: Tactical Air Command
- Decorations: Air Force Outstanding Unit Award

Insignia
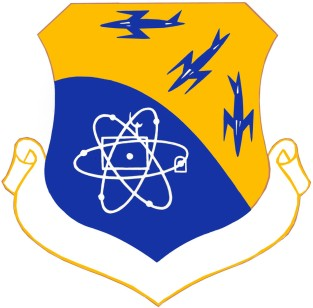
- 26th Air Division emblem (Approved 17 November 1960)

The 26th Air Division (26th AD) is an inactive United States Air Force organization. Its last assignment was with Air Defense Tactical Air Command, assigned to First Air Force, being stationed at March Air Force Base, California. It was inactivated on 30 September 1990.

== History ==
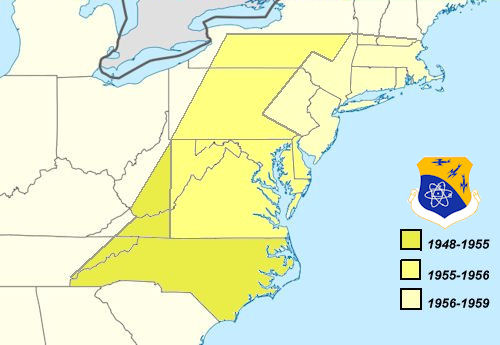
26th Air Division ADC AOR 1948–1959

Was established in October 1948 by Air Defense Command (ADC) as intermediate level of command. Initially responsible for atmospheric air defense of middle Atlantic region from North Carolina to greater New York City area east of the Appalachian mountains. Commanded Manual Direction Center (MDC) at Roslyn Air Force Station, New York (P-3) 1948–1958 directing interceptor units to aircraft identified by Aircraft Control and Warning Squadrons at radar stations in AOR. It employed off shore naval picket ships, fixed "Texas Tower" radar sites, airborne early warning units, and a civilian Ground Observer Corps program. The latter phased down when the SAGE program was implemented.

Improved radar and communications equipment and fighter interceptors, and better techniques and methods, eventually led to the 26th Air Division becoming the first operational Semi Automatic Ground Environment SAGE Direction Center (DC-1) within Air Defense Command at McGuire Air Force Base, New Jersey. Moved to Syracuse Air Force Station New York and commanded SAGE DC-3 Direction Center and first SAGE Command Center (CC-01) beginning in 1958 and assumed operational control of the MDC at Topsham Air Force Station, Maine in August 1958 and the SAGE DC-4 at Fort Lee Air Force Station, Virginia in September 1958.

In 1961 the division assumed air defense training responsibility for Air National Guard (ANG) units within the area. During the Cuban Missile Crisis of 1962, the division deployed fighter aircraft and part of its airborne early warning and control force to Florida.

The 26th's area of control expanded until by 1963 its boundaries extended from the Arctic to the Gulf of Mexico and well toward the center of the United States. Expanded responsibilities in 1963 assuming command of SAGE DC-9 at Gunter Air Force Base, Alabama in July and DC-6 at Custer Air Force Station, Michigan in September and GCI stations in Newfoundland and Labrador formerly under the 64th Air Division.

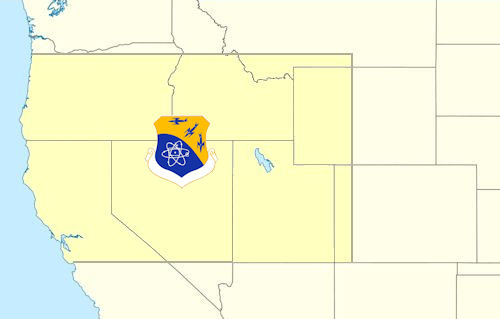
26th Air Division ADC AOR 1966–1979

In April 1966, the division was replaced by the First Air Force, and moved without personnel or equipment to Adair Air Force Station, Oregon, where it assumed responsibility for the defense of Oregon, part of California and Nevada by the inactivation of the Portland and Reno Air Defense Sectors. Assumed additional designation of 26th NORAD Region and 26th CONAD Region after activation of the NORAD Combat Operations Center at the Cheyenne Mountain Complex, Colorado and reporting was transferred to NORAD from ADC at Ent Air Force Base in April 1966.

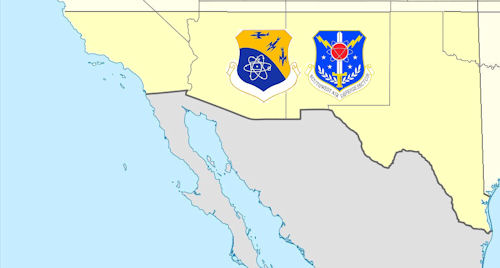
26th Air Division/Southwest Air Defense Sector AOR, 1979–1990

The division was gradually phasing down until it replaced the 27th Air Division at Luke Air Force Base, Arizona in November 1969, when in an ADCOM reorganization of atmospheric defense forces, the command became responsible for the air defense of a large area of the southwest. In October 1979, it transferred to Tactical Air Command (ADTAC) and continued to supervise atmospheric defense forces of its assigned AOR. Assumed additional designation 26th ADCOM Region on 8 December 1978.

Began phase-down of operations with activation of new Southwest Air Defense Sector (SWADS) in July 1987. Engaged chiefly in transfer of mission to SWADS 1987–1990. Inactivated on 1 October 1990.

== Lineage ==
- Established as the 26th Air Defense Division on 21 October 1948

Activated on 16 November 1948
Re-designated: 26th Air Division (Defense) on 20 June 1949
Inactivated on 1 February 1952

- Organized on 1 February 1952

Redesignated 26th Air Division (SAGE) on 8 August 1958
Redesignated 26th Air Division on 1 April 1966
Inactivated on 30 September 1969

- Reactivated on 18 November 1969

Organized on 19 November 1969
Inactivated on 30 September 1990

=== Assignments ===
- First Air Force, 16 November 1948
- Air Defense Command, 1 April 1949 (attached to Eastern Air Defense Force after 17 November 1949)
- First Air Force, 16 November 1949 (remained attached to Eastern Air Defense Force)
- Eastern Air Defense Force, 1 September 1950 – 1 February 1952
- Eastern Air Defense Force, 1 February 1952
- Air Defense Command, 1 August 1959
- Fourth Air Force, 1 April 1966 – 30 September 1969
- Tenth Air Force, 19 November 1969
- Aerospace Defense Command, 1 December 1969
- Air Defense Tactical Air Command, 1 October 1979
- First Air Force, 6 December 1985 – 30 September 1990

=== Stations ===
- Mitchel Air Force Base, New York, 16 November 1948
- Mitchel Air Force Base Sub Base #3, (later) Roslyn Air Force Station, New York, 18 April 1949
- Syracuse Air Force Station (later Hancock Field), New York, 15 August 1958
- Stewart Air Force Base, New York, 15 June 1964
- Adair Air Force Base, Oregon, 1 April 1966 – 30 September 1969
- Luke Air Force Base, Arizona 19 November 1969
- March Air Force Base, California, 31 August 1983 – 1 July 1987

=== Components ===
==== Air Force ====
- Air Forces Iceland

Keflavik Airport, Iceland, 1 July – 4 September 1963

==== Sectors ====
- Bangor Air Defense Sector (BaADS)

Topsham Air Force Base, Maine, 15 August 1958 – 1 April 1966

- Boston Air Defense Sector (BADS)

Hancock Field, New York, 1 April 1966

- Detroit Air Defense Sector (DADS)

Custer Air Force Station, Michigan, 4 September 1963 – 1 April 1966

- Goose Air Defense Sector (GADS)

Goose AB, Labrador, 1 July 1963 – 1 April 1966

- Montgomery Air Defense Sector (MADS)

Gunter Air Force Base, Alabama, 1 July 1963 – 1 April 1966

- New York Air Defense Sector (NYADS)

McGuire Air Force Base, New Jersey, 8 January 1957 – 1 April 1966

- Syracuse Air Defense Sector (SYADS)

Syracuse Air Force Station, New York, 15 August 1958 – 4 September 1963

- Washington Air Defense Sector (WADS)

Fort Lee Air Force Station, Virginia, 1 September 1958 – 1 April 1966

==== Wings ====
- 1st Fighter Wing (Air Defense)

Hamilton Air Force Base, California, 31 December 1969 – 10 October 1970

- 78th Fighter Wing (Air Defense)

Hamilton Air Force Base, California, 1 April 1966 – 15 September 1969; 19 November – 31 December 1969

- 551st Airborne Early Warning and Control Wing

Otis Air Force Base, Massachusetts, 1 July 1959 – 1 April 1966

- 4601st Support Wing (DEW)

Paramus, New Jersey, 1 July – 1 October 1963

- 4621st Air Defense Wing (SAGE)

McGuire Air Force Base, New Jersey, 18 October 1956 – 8 January 1957

- 4622d Air Defense Wing (SAGE)

Stewart Air Force Base, New York, 18 October 1956 – 8 January 1957

- 4707th Air Defense Wing

Otis Air Force Base, Massachusetts, 1 March – 18 October 1956

- 4709th Air Defense Wing

McGuire Air Force Base, New York, 16 February 1953 – 1 September 1954

- 4710th Air Defense Wing

New Castle Air Force Base, Delaware, 16 February 1953 – 1 September 1954

==== Groups ====
- 408th Fighter Group (Air Defense)

Kingsley Field, Oregon, 1 April 1966 – 15 September 1969

- 408th Fighter Group

Oxnard Air Force Base, California, 19 November – 31 December 1969

- 503d Aircraft Control and Warning Group

Roslyn Air Force Base, New York, 1 January 1951 – 6 February 1952

- 751st Air Defense Group

Mount Laguna Air Force Station, California, 1 March 1970 – 1 January 1974

- 858th Air Defense Group

Fallon Air Force Station, Nevada, 1 March 1970 – 1 January 1974

==== Interceptor squadrons ====
- 82d Fighter-Interceptor Squadron

Travis Air Force Base, California, 1 April – 25 June 1966

- 84th Fighter-Interceptor Squadron

Hamilton Air Force Base, California, 1 October 1970 – 1 September 1973
Castle Air Force Base, California, 1 September 1973 – 1 July 1987

- 456th Fighter-Interceptor Squadron

Castle Air Force Base, California, 1 April 1966 – 18 July 1968

==== Radar squadrons ====
- 634th Radar Squadron

Burns Air Force Station, Oregon, 1 April 1966 – 15 September 1969

- 636th Radar Squadron

Condon Air Force Station, Oregon, 1 April 1966 – 15 September 1969

- 646th Aircraft Control and Warning Squadron

Highlands Air Force Station, New Jersey, 6 February 1952 – 16 February 1953

- 647th Aircraft Control and Warning Squadron

Quantico Air Force Station, Virginia, 6 February 1952 – 16 February 1953

- 648th Aircraft Control and Warning Squadron

Benton Air Force Station, Pennsylvania, 6 February 1952 – 16 February 1953

- 649th Aircraft Control and Warning Squadron

Bedford Air Force Station, Virginia, 26 May 1953 – 1 May 1954

- 658th Radar Squadron

Winnemucca Air Force Station, Nevada, 1 April 1966 – 18 June 1968

- 666th Radar Squadron

Mill Valley Air Force Station, California, 1 April 1966 – 15 September 1969; 19 November 1969 – 30 September 1980

- 670th Radar Squadron

San Pedro Hill Air Force Station, California, 19 November 1969 – 1 April 1976

- 682d Radar Squadron

Almaden Air Force Station, California, 1 April 1966 – 15 September 1969; 19 November 1969 – 1 April 1980

- 750th Radar Squadron

Boron Air Force Station, California, 19 November 1969 – 30 June 1975

- 751st Radar Squadron

Mount Laguna Air Force Station, California, 19 November 1969 – 30 November 1981

- 761st Radar Squadron

North Bend Air Force Station, Oregon, 1 April 1966 – 15 September 1969

- 770th Aircraft Control and Warning Squadron

Palermo Air Force Station, New Jersey, 6 February 1952 – 16 February 1953

- 771st Aircraft Control and Warning Squadron

Cape Charles Air Force Station, Virginia, 6 February 1952 – 16 February 1953

- 772d Aircraft Control and Warning Squadron

Claysburg Air Force Station, Pennsylvania, 6 February 1952 – 16 February 1953

- 773d Aircraft Control and Warning Squadron

Montauk Air Force Station, New York, 6 February 1952 – 16 February 1953

- 774th Radar Squadron

Madera Air Force Station, California, 1 April – 25 June 1966

- 775th Radar Squadron

Cambria Air Force Station, California, 19 November 1969 – 30 September 1980

- 776th Radar Squadron

Point Arena Air Force Station, California, 1 April 1966 – 15 September 1969; 19 November 1969 – 30 September 1980

- 777th Radar Squadron

Klamath Air Force Station, California, 1 April 1966 – 15 September 1969

- 821st Radar Squadron

Baker Air Force Station, Oregon, 1 April 1966 – 18 June 1968

- 827th Radar Squadron

Kingsley Field, Oregon, 1 April 1966 – 15 September 1969

- 858th Radar Squadron

Fallon Air Force Station, Nevada, 1 April 1966 – 15 September 1969; 19 November 1969 – 1 March 1970

- 859th Radar Squadron

Red Bluff Air Force Station, California, 1 April 1966 – 15 September 1969; 19 November 1969 – 30 September 1970

- 866th Radar Squadron

Tonopah Air Force Station, Nevada, 1 April 1966 – 15 September 1969; 19 November 1969 – 1 July 1970

==== Radar evaluation squadron ====
- 4758th Radar Evaluation Squadron (ECM)

Griffiss Air Force Base, New York, 1 July – 20 October 1959

== See also ==
- List of United States Air Force Aerospace Defense Command Interceptor Squadrons
- List of United States Air Force air divisions
- United States general surveillance radar stations
