= Crater Lake–Klamath Regional Airport =

Airport in Oregon, United States of America

Crater Lake Klamath Regional Airport Kingsley Field
- IATA: LMT; ICAO: KLMT; FAA LID: LMT

Summary
- Airport type: Public
- Owner: City of Klamath Falls
- Serves: Klamath Falls, Oregon
- Elevation AMSL: 4,095 ft (1,248 m)
- Coordinates: 42°09′22″N 121°43′59″W

Maps
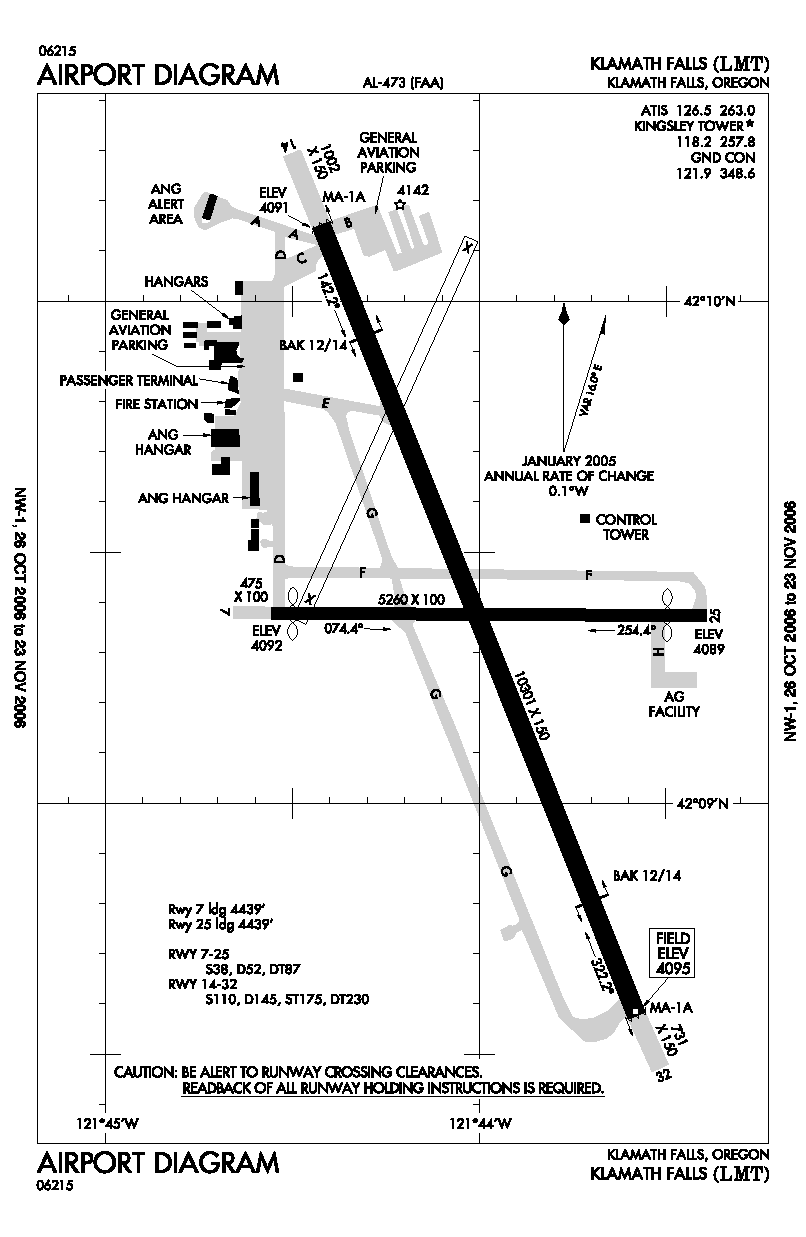
- FAA diagram

- Location within Oregon Location within the United States

Runways
| Direction | Length | | Surface |
| Direction | ft | m | Surface |
|---|---|---|---|
| 14/32 | 10,302 | 3,140 | Asphalt/concrete |
| 7/25 | 5,258 | 1,603 | Asphalt |

Statistics (2021)
- Aircraft operations: 35,123
- Based aircraft: 111
- Source: Federal Aviation Administration

Crater Lake–Klamath Regional Airport (Klamath Falls Airport) (IATA: LMT, ICAO: KLMT, FAA LID: LMT) is a public use airport in Klamath County, Oregon, United States, five miles southeast of Klamath Falls, which owns it. It is used by general aviation and military aviation. In 2013, the name of the airport was changed to Crater Lake-Klamath Regional Airport.

The airport previously offered scheduled commercial passenger service, but does not currently offer regularly scheduled passenger flights. It continues to support private aircraft, general aviation and military operations.

As Kingsley Field Air National Guard Base, the airport is home to the Oregon Air National Guard's 173rd Fighter Wing. The wing previously operated the F-15 Eagle, serving as a major fighter pilot training center for the U.S. Air Force and Air National Guard. Following the departure of its final F-15 aircraft in December 2025, the wing began transitioning to the F-35A Lightning II. In October 2026, the U.S. Air Force officially approved the basing of 26 F-35A aircraft at Kingsley Field, with the first aircraft expected to arrive in summer 2027. The base will serve as a formal training unit for F-35 pilots, continuing its long standing role in military aviation training. The 173d Fighter Wing is currently under the command of Colonel Adam Gaudinski.

== History ==
In 1928, the citizens of Klamath Falls approved the sale of $50,000 worth of bonds to build Klamath Falls Municipal Airport. It had gravel runways and one Fixed-Base Operator; in 1942, it was selected for a Naval Air Station later named NAS Klamath Falls. In 1945, the airport was transferred back to civil use; the January 1952 C&GS diagram shows runway 7 (5258 ft long), 14 (7134 ft) and 18 (5164 ft).

In 1954, the airport was selected as a U.S. Air Force Air Defense Command base, becoming a joint-use civil-military location. The 408th Fighter Group arrived to supervise these activities, authorized Mighty Mouse rocket and airborne intercept radar equipped North American F-86 Sabres. But for some years the assigned 518th Fighter-Interceptor Squadron was not made operational, remaining inactive.

In 1957 the airport was dedicated as Kingsley Field in honor of 2nd Lieutenant David R. Kingsley, USAAF, an Oregonian killed in action on June 23, 1944, after a Boeing B-17 Flying Fortress bombing mission over the oil fields of Ploiesti, Roumania. The 827th Aircraft Control and Warning Squadron (later 827th Radar Squadron) was activated at Kingsley Field the same year. While the administrative and support sections of the squadron were located on the airfield, the squadrons operational element and radars were located nearby at what was named Keno Air Force Station in February 1959.

The 408th Fighter Group was reassigned to the 25th Air Division on 1 March 1959; to the Portland Air Defense Sector on 15 April 1960; to the 26th Air Division on 1 April 1966; and the 25th Air Division on 15 September 1969. The group was inactivated on 1 October 1970.

Fighter-interceptor squadrons which operated from Kingsley Field were:

- 322d Fighter-Interceptor Squadron, 1 April 1959 – 30 September 1968 (F-101B Voodoo)
- 59th Fighter-Interceptor Squadron, 30 September 1968 – 17 December 1969 (F-101B/F Voodoo])
- 460th Fighter-Interceptor Squadron, 1 December 1969 – 16 April 1971 (F-106A/B Delta Dart)

In 1976, ADC was inactivated and control passed to Tactical Air Command (TAC). In 1978, the Department of Defense transferred the facilities from the active duty Air Force to the Oregon Air National Guard. The now-827th Radar Squadron was inactivated on 1 October 1979.

In August 2020, it was announced that Kingsley Field would host the Air Force's first F-15EX formal training unit from 2022. The F-15EX is intended to replace the aging F-15C/D Eagle, which is expected to run out of service life by the mid-2020s.

These plans were revised in May 2023, with it being announced that Kingsley Field would instead host a Lockheed Martin F-35 Lightning II training unit. It is intended that 26 of the type will be based at Kingsley Field from approximately 2027.

== Facilities ==
Crater Lake–Klamath Regional Airport covers 1,251 acres (506 ha) at an elevation of 4,095 feet (1,248 m). It has two runways: 14/32 is 10,302 by 150 feet (3,140 x 46 m) asphalt and concrete; 7/25 is 5,258 by 100 feet (1,603 x 30 m) asphalt.

In the year ending December 31, 2021, the airport had 35,123 aircraft operations, average 96 per day: 54% general aviation, 37% military, and 9% air taxi. 111 aircraft were then based at the airport: 63 single-engine, 18 jet, 18 military, 10 multi-engine, and 2 helicopter.

The airport is home to the Klamath Falls Interagency Fire Center, the Klamath Falls Airtanker Base and the Tanker 61 Memorial, commemorating a TBM Inc. firebomber lost in 1992.

As of April 2025, the airport is currently open on weekdays year round for public use, the airport also includes airline refueling, a flight school and car rentals. Fuel prices are around $6.00 and currently a landing fee is charged to incoming aircraft.

== Airline history ==
Until 1959, United Airlines Douglas DC-3s and Convair 340s served Klamath Falls; later West Coast Airlines flew Fairchild F-27s to cities in Oregon and California. West Coast merged with Bonanza Air Lines and Pacific Air Lines to form Air West which subsequently changed its name to Hughes Airwest and was then later merged into Republic Airlines. Air West and Hughes Airwest continued to serve the airport with F-27s. Hughes Airwest introduced the first jets, Douglas DC-9-10 and McDonnell Douglas DC-9-30s, and was operating nonstop flights to Redding, CA and Redmond, OR as well as direct service to San Francisco, Seattle and Eugene, OR in 1980; successor Republic DC-9s continued to serve the airport with nonstop flights to Redding and Redmond as well as flying direct jet service to San Francisco, Seattle and Portland, OR in 1982 before ceasing serving Klamath Falls in 1983. United Airlines returned with Boeing 737 jets direct to San Francisco in March, 1986 but the service ended in November, 1987.

From the late 1970s to early 1980s, Air Oregon Fairchild Swearingen Metroliners flew direct to Portland, Seattle and other cities. In the mid-1980s, Pacific Express BAC One-Eleven jets flew to San Francisco via Redding and to Portland via Redmond. Horizon Air, a subsidiary of Alaska Airlines, flew de Havilland Canada DHC-8 Dash 8s and Fairchild Swearingen Metroliners to Portland and Seattle. From the mid-1980s to the early 1990s American Eagle Fairchild Swearingen Metroliners flew direct to San Francisco and San Jose, CA via Chico, CA or Redding on behalf of American Airlines. WestAir operating as United Express) flew BAe Jetstream 31s to San Francisco while Reno Air Express operated by Mid Pacific Air on behalf of Reno Air) flew BAe Jetstream 31s to San Jose, CA. United Express operated by SkyWest Airlines pulled out of Klamath Falls in the late 1990s but then resumed flights when Horizon Air ceased serving the airport.

SkyWest Embraer EMB-120 Brasilias operated the last United Express service into Klamath Falls. In late 2010, SkyWest dropped one flight to Portland. Passenger count dropped in 2011, but passengers per flight increased. United Express, operated by SkyWest on behalf of United Airlines, terminated service to Portland and San Francisco on June 5, 2014.

PenAir started Saab 340B flights from Klamath Falls to Portland on October 6, 2016. Initially, the proposed service by PenAir was on hold from 2015 due to federal Transportation Security Administration (TSA) refusal to station security personnel at the terminal. As of August 2017, this service has ended, following PenAir filing for bankruptcy.

== Airlines and destinations ==
=== Cargo ===
| Airlines | Destinations |
|---|---|
| Ameriflight | Medford, Portland (OR) |
| FedEx Feeder | Portland (OR), Redmond/Bend |

== Funding ==
The Airport City Fund operates the airport's civilian and military interest. Revenue mainly is from city property taxes, transient room taxes and the rental activities in the airport itself. Because of the commercial flights at the airport, the Federal Aviation Administration contributes funds to keep the runways and taxiways in good conditions.

== Accidents at or near LMT ==
- On March 10, 1967, West Coast Airlines Flight 720, a Fairchild F-27, crashed 2 minutes after takeoff in snowy conditions into Stukel Mountain 4.1 miles SE of Klamath Airport because of ice accretion on the airframe surfaces and was not de-iced by crews before takeoff. All 4 occupants (3 crew, 1 passenger) were killed.

== See also ==
- Sky Lakes Medical Center Heliport
