= Airfields of the United States Army Air Forces First Air Force =

The list of Airfields of the United States Army Air Forces First Air Force is as follows:

Tactical Airfields

- Charleston Army Air Base
- Dover Air Force Base
- Fort Dix Army Air Base
- Godman Army Airfield
- Mitchel Field
- Norfolk International Airport
- Richmond International Airport
- Scholes International Airport at Galveston
- Suffolk County Army Air Field
- Westover Field
- Wilmington International Airport

Group Training Stations

- Baltimore Municipal Airport
- Charleston Army Air Base
- Columbia Army Air Base
- Dover Air Force Base
- Fort Dix Army Air Base
- Godman Army Airfield
- Groton–New London Airport
- Harris Neck Army Air Field
- Millville Army Airfield
- Mitchel Field
- Oscoda Army Air Field
- Reading Regional Airport
- Richmond International Airport
- Selfridge Air National Guard Base
- Westover Field

Replacement Training Stations

- Aiken Army Air Field
- Charleston Army Air Base
- Columbia Army Air Base
- Dover Air Force Base
- Florence Regional Airport
- Fort Dix Army Air Base
- Godman Army Airfield
- Greenville Army Air Base
- Lowcountry Regional Airport
- Millville Army Airfield
- Mitchel Field
- Oscoda Army Air Field
- Selfridge Air National Guard Base
- Shaw Air Force Base
- Westover Field

== Sources ==
- R. Frank Futrell, “The Development of Base Facilities,” in The Army Air Forces in World War II, vol. 6, Men and Planes, ed. Wesley Frank Craven and James Lea Cate, 142 (Washington, D.C., Office of Air Force History, new imprint, 1983).
