= Ground Equipment Facility J-82 =

Radar station in Oregon, US 1957–1979

Keno Air Force Station
- Part of Air Defense Command (ADC)
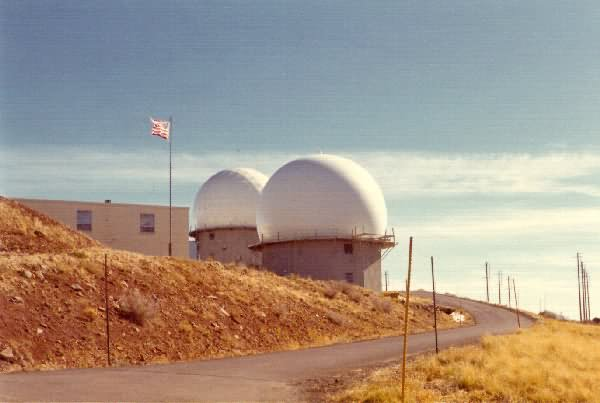
- Circa 1975 historical photograph

Site information
- Type: Air Force Station
- Controlled by: United States Air Force

Location
- Location of Keno AFS, Oregon
- Coordinates: 42°04′08″N 121°58′20″W

Site history
- Built: 1957
- In use: 1958-1979

Garrison information
- Garrison: 827th Aircraft Control and Warning Squadron

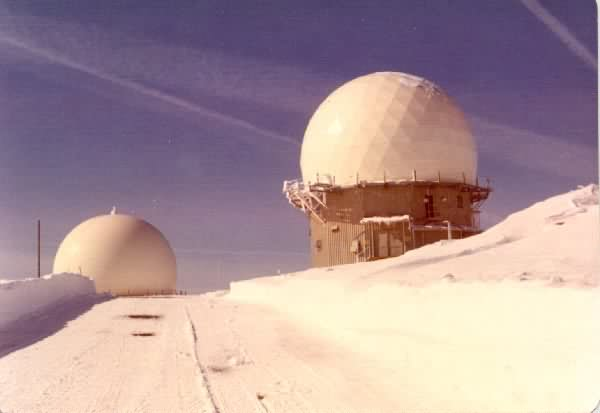
FPS-6 and FPS-67 radars

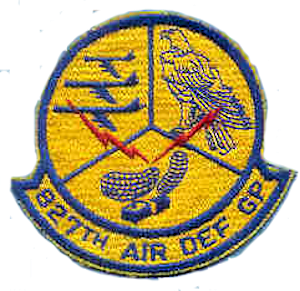
827th Radar Squadron emblem

Keno Air Force Station (ADC ID: TM-180, NORAD ID: Z-180) is a closed United States Air Force General Surveillance Radar station. It is located 4.6 miles (7.4 km) south-southwest of Keno, Oregon. It was closed in 1979 by the Air Force, and turned over to the Federal Aviation Administration (FAA).

Today the site is part of the Joint Surveillance System (JSS), designated by NORAD as Western Air Defense Sector (WADS) Ground Equipment Facility J-82.

== History ==
Keno Air Force Station came into existence as part of Phase III of the Air Defense Command Mobile Radar program. On October 20, 1953 ADC requested a third phase of twenty-five radar sites be constructed. The site was located east of the Cascade mountains to provide coverage of the air refueling tracks in Northern California. In 1957, 306 acres of land were acquired for DoD use at the new site.

The 827th Aircraft Warning and Control Squadron was assigned to the new station on 1 February 1958. Logistical support and housing for personnel was provided by Kingsley Field in Klamath Falls, thirteen miles to the east. The squadron initially began operations with an AN/FPS-20A search radar and a pair of AN/FPS-6A height-finder radars (one east hemisphere coverage, and one west). A Ground-Air Transmit/Receive site (GATR) was co-located on the site, with antennas favoring the south toward the air refueling tracks in California.

Initially the station functioned as a Ground Control Intercept (GCI) and warning station. As a GCI station, the squadron's role was to guide interceptor aircraft toward unidentified intruders picked up on the unit's radar scopes. In 1960 Keno became a joint-use facility with the Federal Aviation Administration (FAA), performing air-traffic-control duties. In 1961 the search radar was upgraded and redesignated as an AN/FPS-67.

During 1962 Keno AFS joined the Semi Automatic Ground Environment (SAGE) system, feeding data to DC-13 at Adair AFS, Oregon. After joining, the squadron was redesignated as the 827th Radar Squadron (SAGE) on 1 December 1962. The radar squadron provided information 24/7 the SAGE Direction Center where it was analyzed to determine range, direction altitude speed and whether or not aircraft were friendly or hostile. In 1963 an AN/FPS-90 replaced the east hemisphere coverage AN/FPS-6 height-finder radar, and the search radar was further upgraded to the AN/FPS-67B version. On 31 July 1963, the site was redesignated as NORAD ID Z-180.

In addition to the main facility, Keno operated several AN/FPS-14 Gap Filler sites:

- Yreka, CA (TM-180A) 41°44′18″N 122°46′36″W
- La Pine, OR (TM-180B) 43°41′22″N 121°15′16″W

Routine operations continued until 1 March 1970 when the 827th Radar Squadron was inactivated and replaced by the 827th Air Defense Group, operating the BUIC installation. The upgrade to group status was done because of Kingsley Field's status as a Backup Interceptor Control (BUIC) site. BUIC sites were alternate control sites in the event that SAGE Direction Centers became disabled and unable to control interceptor aircraft. The group was inactivated and replaced by the 827th Radar Squadron as defenses against crewed bombers were reduced. The group was disbanded in 1984. Over the years, the equipment at the station was upgraded or modified to improve the efficiency and accuracy of the information gathered by the radars. The Radar Squadron was inactivated 1 October 1979 when operations reverted to an Operating Location of the 25th Air Division at McChord AFB. At the time of its BUIC III inactivation in 1976, the 827th staffed the last operating BUIC III in the western United States.

In 1976 the AN/FPS-90 was removed and sent to the new Joint Surveillance System (JSS) site J-81 which is 12 miles west of Dallas, Oregon on Laurel Mountain, where it became operational in 1980 until replaced by a 3D ARSR-4 FAA radar.

The remaining height-finder radar, upgraded to an AN/FPS-116, was retired c. 1988 and the station closed, and property transferred to the FAA.

In the early 1990s, the abandoned station buildings at the former Keno AFS were removed (including the sewage lagoon) and most of the site has been returned to its natural state. Today, only the FAA unattended search radar is functional.

== Air Force units and assignments ==
=== Units ===
- Constituted as the 827th Aircraft Control and Warning Squadron

Activated at Kingsley Field, Oregon on 1 September 1957

Radar site renamed Keno Air Force Station Oregon on 1 February 1958
Site merged back into Kingsley Field on 1 January 1959

Redesignated 827th Radar Squadron (SAGE) on 1 December 1962
Inactivated on 1 March 1970
Redesignated 827th Radar Squadron on 1 January 1974
Activated on 17 January 1974
Inactivated on 1 October 1979

- Constituted as the 827th Air Defense Group on 13 February 1970

Activated on 1 March 1970
Inactivated on 17 January 1974
Disbanded on 21 September 1984

=== Assignments ===
- Squadron

28th Air Division, 1 September 1957
25th Air Division, 1 March 1959
Portland Air Defense Sector, 1 March 1960
26th Air Division, 1 April 1966
27th Air Division, 15 September 1969
26th Air Division, 19 November 1969
25th Air Division, 17 January 1974 - 1 October 1979

- Group

25th Air Division, 1 March 1970 - 17 January 1974

=== Commanders ===
- Squadron
- Group

Lt Col. Richard A. Wood, 1 Mar 1970 - unknown

== See also ==
- List of USAF Aerospace Defense Command General Surveillance Radar Stations
- List of United States Air Force aircraft control and warning squadrons
