= Weaponeering =

Field for designing an attack with weapons

Weaponeering is the field of designing an attack with weapons. It is a portmanteau of weapon and engineering. The term should not be confused with weapons engineering, which is the actual engineering design and development of weapon systems.

The United States Department of Defense defines the term as the process of determining the quantity of a specific type of lethal or nonlethal weapons required to achieve a specific level of damage to a given target, considering target vulnerability, weapon effect, munitions delivery accuracy, damage criteria, probability of kill and weapon reliability.
