= Leadership of the United States Northern Command =

U.S. Northern Command commander

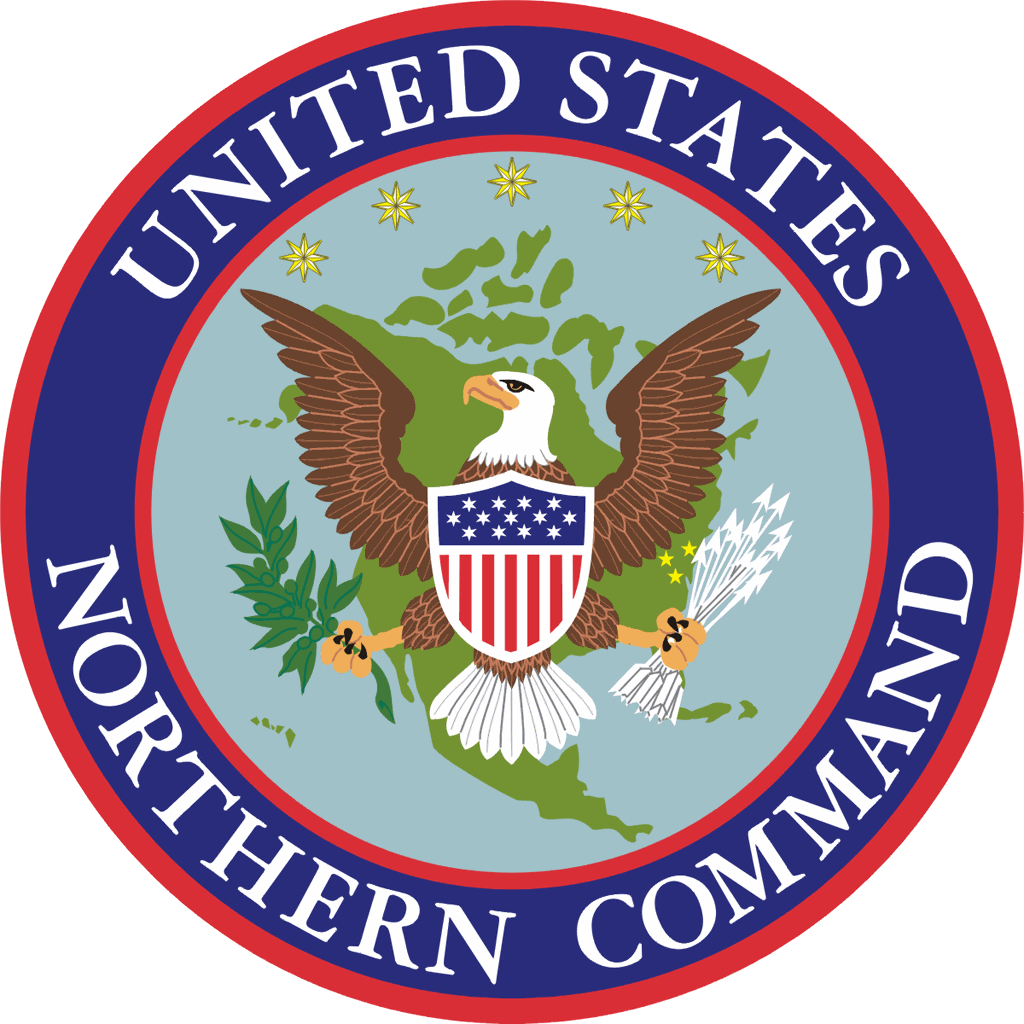
Seal of the United States Northern Command

This is a list of all commanders, deputy commanders, senior enlisted leaders, and chiefs of staff of the United States Northern Command.

== Current headquarters staff ==
- Gregory M. Guillot, Commander
  - Joseph F. Jarrard, Deputy Commander
    - Michael J. Simmering, Chief of Staff
      - Maurizio D. Calabrese, Director for Intelligence and Information (J2)
      - Robert D. Davis, Director for Operations (J3)
      - Gregory D. Newkirk, Director for Plans, Policy and Strategy (J5)
        - Karen L. Pound, Deputy Director for Plans, Policy and Strategy
      - Vacant, Director for Cyberspace Operations (J6)

== List of leaders of the United States Northern Command ==
=== Commanders ===
Commander of the United States Northern Command
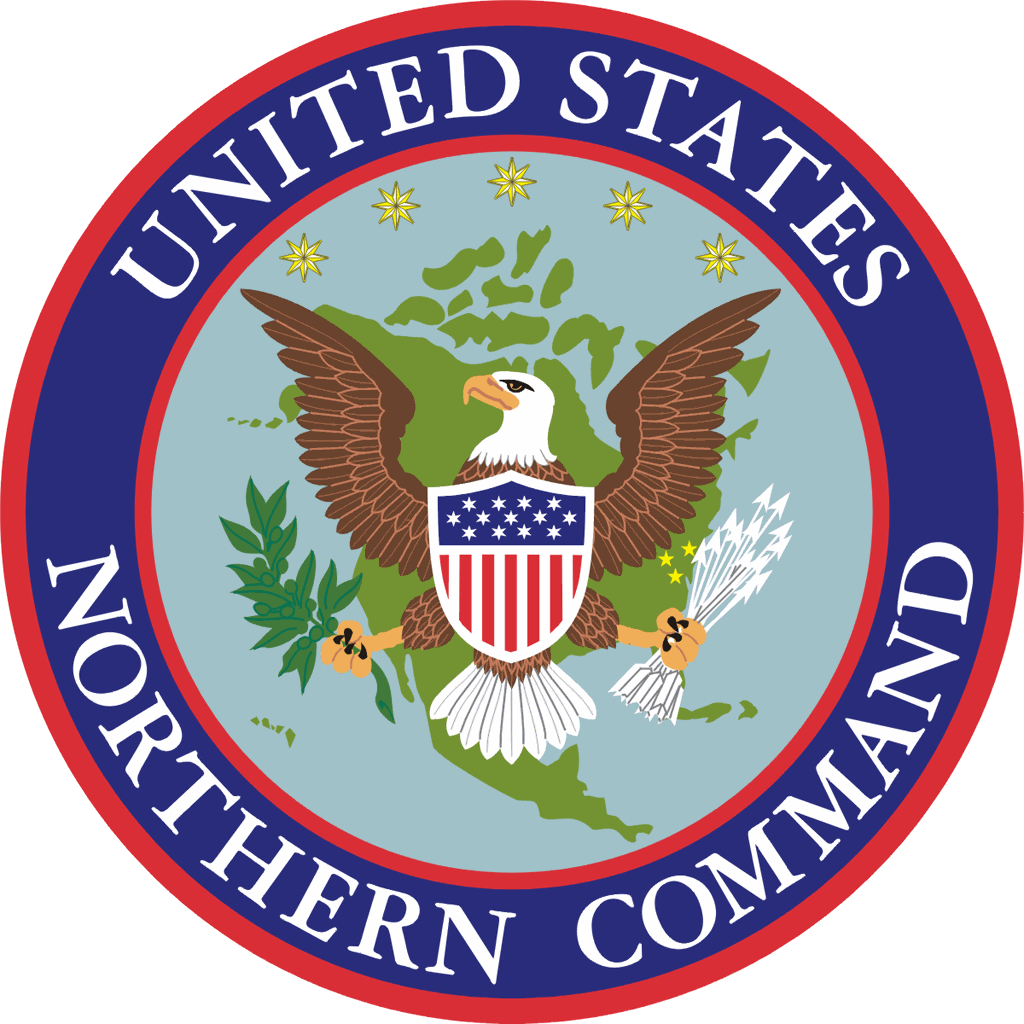
- Emblem of the United States Northern Command

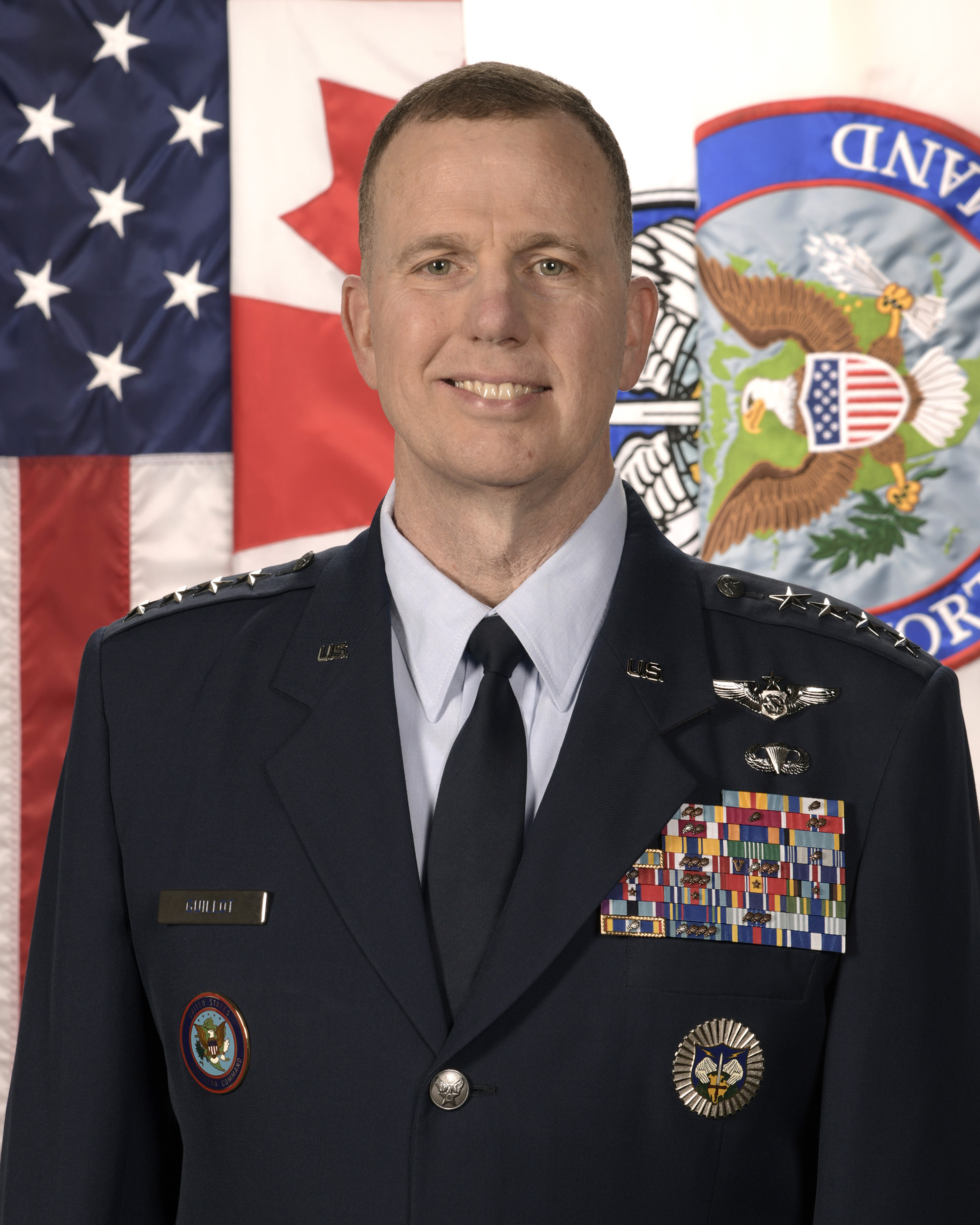
- Incumbent; General Gregory M. Guillot, USAF since 5 February 2024
- United States Department of Defense
- Type: Unified combatant commander
- Abbreviation: CDRUSNORTHCOM
- Reports to: President of the United States; Secretary of Defense
- Seat: Peterson Space Force Base, Colorado Springs, Colorado, U.S.
- Nominator: Secretary of Defense
- Appointer: The president with Senate advice and consent
- Term length: 2–3 years (approx.)
- Constituting instrument: 10 U.S.C. § 164
- Formation: 22 October 2002
- First holder: Ralph E. Eberhart
- Deputy: Deputy Commander, United States Northern Command

No.	Commander		Term			Service branch
No.	Portrait	Name	Took office	Left office	Term length	Service branch
1	Ralph E. Eberhart	General; Ralph E. Eberhart (born 1946)	22 October 2002	5 November 2004	2 years, 14 days	U.S. Air Force
2	Timothy J. Keating	Admiral; Timothy J. Keating (born 1948)	5 November 2004	23 March 2007	2 years, 138 days	U.S. Navy
3	Victor E. Renuart Jr.	General; Victor E. Renuart Jr. (born 1949)	23 March 2007	19 May 2010	3 years, 57 days	U.S. Air Force
4	James A. Winnefeld Jr.	Admiral; James A. Winnefeld Jr. (born 1956)	19 May 2010	3 August 2011	1 year, 76 days	U.S. Navy
5	Charles H. Jacoby Jr.	General; Charles H. Jacoby Jr. (born 1954)	3 August 2011	5 December 2014	3 years, 124 days	U.S. Army
6	William E. Gortney	Admiral; William E. Gortney (born 1955)	5 December 2014	13 May 2016	1 year, 160 days	U.S. Navy
7	Lori J. Robinson	General; Lori J. Robinson (born 1958/1959)	13 May 2016	24 May 2018	2 years, 11 days	U.S. Air Force
8	Terrence J. O'Shaughnessy	General; Terrence J. O'Shaughnessy (born 1964/1965)	24 May 2018	20 August 2020	2 years, 73 days	U.S. Air Force
9	Glen D. VanHerck	General; Glen D. VanHerck (born 1962)	20 August 2020	5 February 2024	3 years, 169 days	U.S. Air Force
10	Gregory M. Guillot	General; Gregory M. Guillot	5 February 2024	Incumbent	2 years, 214 days	U.S. Air Force

Commanders of U.S. Northern Command by branches of service

- Air Force: 6
- Navy: 3
- Army: 1
- Space Force: none
- Marine Corps: none
- Coast Guard: none

=== Deputy commanders ===
No.	Deputy Commander		Term			Service branch
No.	Portrait	Name	Took office	Left office	Term length	Service branch
1	Edward G. Anderson III	Lieutenant General; Edward G. Anderson III	1 October 2002	25 June 2004	1 year, 268 days	U.S. Army
–	Raymond F. Rees	Major General; Raymond F. Rees (born 1944); Acting	25 June 2004	22 July 2004	27 days	U.S. Army
2	Joseph R. Inge	Lieutenant General; Joseph R. Inge (1947–2023)	22 July 2004	29 May 2007	2 years, 311 days	U.S. Army
3	William G. Webster	Lieutenant General; William G. Webster (born 1951)	29 May 2007	16 January 2009	1 year, 232 days	U.S. Army
4	H. Steven Blum	Lieutenant General; H. Steven Blum (born 1946)	16 January 2009	27 May 2010	1 year, 131 days	U.S. Army
5	Frank J. Grass	Lieutenant General; Frank J. Grass (born 1951)	3 October 2010	27 August 2012	1 year, 329 days	U.S. Army
6	Michael Dubie	Lieutenant General; Michael Dubie (born 1960)	27 August 2012	31 July 2015	2 years, 338 days	U.S. Air Force
7	Daniel R. Hokanson	Lieutenant General; Daniel R. Hokanson (born 1963)	31 July 2015	24 October 2016	1 year, 85 days	U.S. Army
8	Reynold N. Hoover	Lieutenant General; Reynold N. Hoover (born 1961)	24 October 2016	5 November 2018	2 years, 12 days	U.S. Army
9	Mike Dumont	Vice Admiral; Mike Dumont	5 November 2018	~20 March 2021	2 years, 135 days	U.S. Navy
10	A. C. Roper	Lieutenant General; A. C. Roper (born 1963)	4 May 2021	30 April 2024	2 years, 362 days	U.S. Army
11	Thomas Carden	Lieutenant General; Thomas Carden	4 May 2024	13 January 2026	1 year, 254 days	U.S. Army
12	Joseph F. Jarrard	Lieutenant General; Joseph F. Jarrard	13 January 2026	Incumbent	237 days	U.S. Army

=== Senior enlisted leaders ===
No.	Senior Enlisted Leader		Term			Service branch
No.	Portrait	Name	Took office	Left office	Term length	Service branch
1	Kevin D. Estrem	Chief Master Sergeant; Kevin D. Estrem	1 October 2002	12 January 2004	1 year, 103 days	U.S. Air Force
2	D. Scott Frye	Sergeant Major; D. Scott Frye	12 January 2004	26 March 2007	3 years, 73 days	U.S. Marine Corps
3	Daniel R. Wood	Command Sergeant Major; Daniel R. Wood	26 March 2007	21 May 2009	2 years, 56 days	U.S. Army
4	William A. Usry	Chief Master Sergeant; William A. Usry	21 May 2009	15 September 2011	2 years, 117 days	U.S. Air Force
5	Robert A. Winzenried	Command Sergeant Major; Robert A. Winzenried	15 September 2011	5 November 2014	3 years, 51 days	U.S. Army
6	Terrence I. Molidor	Fleet Master Chief; Terrence I. Molidor	5 November 2014	21 October 2016	1 year, 351 days	U.S. Navy
7	Harold L. Hutchison	Chief Master Sergeant; Harold L. Hutchison	21 October 2016	26 January 2018	1 year, 97 days	U.S. Air Force
8	Paul G. McKenna	Sergeant Major; Paul G. McKenna	15 February 2018	29 June 2021	3 years, 134 days	U.S. Marine Corps
9	James K. Porterfield	Sergeant Major; James K. Porterfield	29 June 2021	14 June 2024	2 years, 351 days	U.S. Marine Corps
10	John G. Storms	Chief Master Sergeant; John G. Storms	14 June 2024	Incumbent	2 years, 85 days	U.S. Air Force

=== Chiefs of staff ===
No.	Chief of Staff		Term			Service branch
No.	Portrait	Name	Took office	Left office	Term length	Service branch
1	H. Steven Blum	Major General; H. Steven Blum (born 1946)	August 2002	April 2003	~243 days	U.S. Army
2	Raymond F. Rees	Major General; Raymond F. Rees (born 1944)	May 2003	~3 May 2005	~2 years, 2 days	U.S. Army
3	Paul J. Sullivan	Major General; Paul J. Sullivan	3 May 2005	June 2008	~3 years, 29 days	U.S. Air Force
4	John H. Bordelon	Major General; John H. Bordelon	June 2008	March 2010	~1 year, 273 days	U.S. Air Force
5	Howard N. Thompson	Major General; Howard N. Thompson	March 2010	~July 2012	~2 years, 122 days	U.S. Air Force
6	Charles D. Luckey	Major General; Charles D. Luckey (born 1955)	~July 2012	2016	~5 years, 306 days	U.S. Army
7	Peggy C. Combs	Major General; Peggy C. Combs	2016	~2018	~2 years, 0 days	U.S. Army
8	Richard J. Gallant	Major General; Richard J. Gallant	~2018	~June 2020	~2 years, 152 days	U.S. Army
–	Austin Renforth	Brigadier General; Austin Renforth; Acting	~June 2020	~26 August 2020	~86 days	U.S. Marine Corps
9	Michael P. Holland	Rear Admiral; Michael P. Holland (born 1964)	26 August 2020	26 August 2022	2 years, 0 days	U.S. Navy
10	Daniel L. Cheever	Rear Admiral; Daniel L. Cheever (born 1963)	26 August 2022	~31 July 2023	~339 days	U.S. Navy
11	Allan M. Pepin	Major General; Allan M. Pepin (born 1963)	~31 July 2023	July 2024	~350 days	U.S. Army
12	John V. Meyer III	Major General; John V. Meyer III	July 2024	19 November 2025	~1 year, 127 days	U.S. Army
13	Michael J. Simmering	Major General; Michael J. Simmering	19 November 2025	Incumbent	292 days	U.S. Army

== See also ==
- United States Northern Command
- Leadership of the United States Africa Command
- Leadership of the United States European Command
- Leadership of the United States Indo-Pacific Command
- Leadership of the United States Space Command
- Leadership of the United States Cyber Command
- Leadership of the United States Strategic Command
- Leadership of the United States Transportation Command
