= Thomas Carden =

US Army National Guard general officer

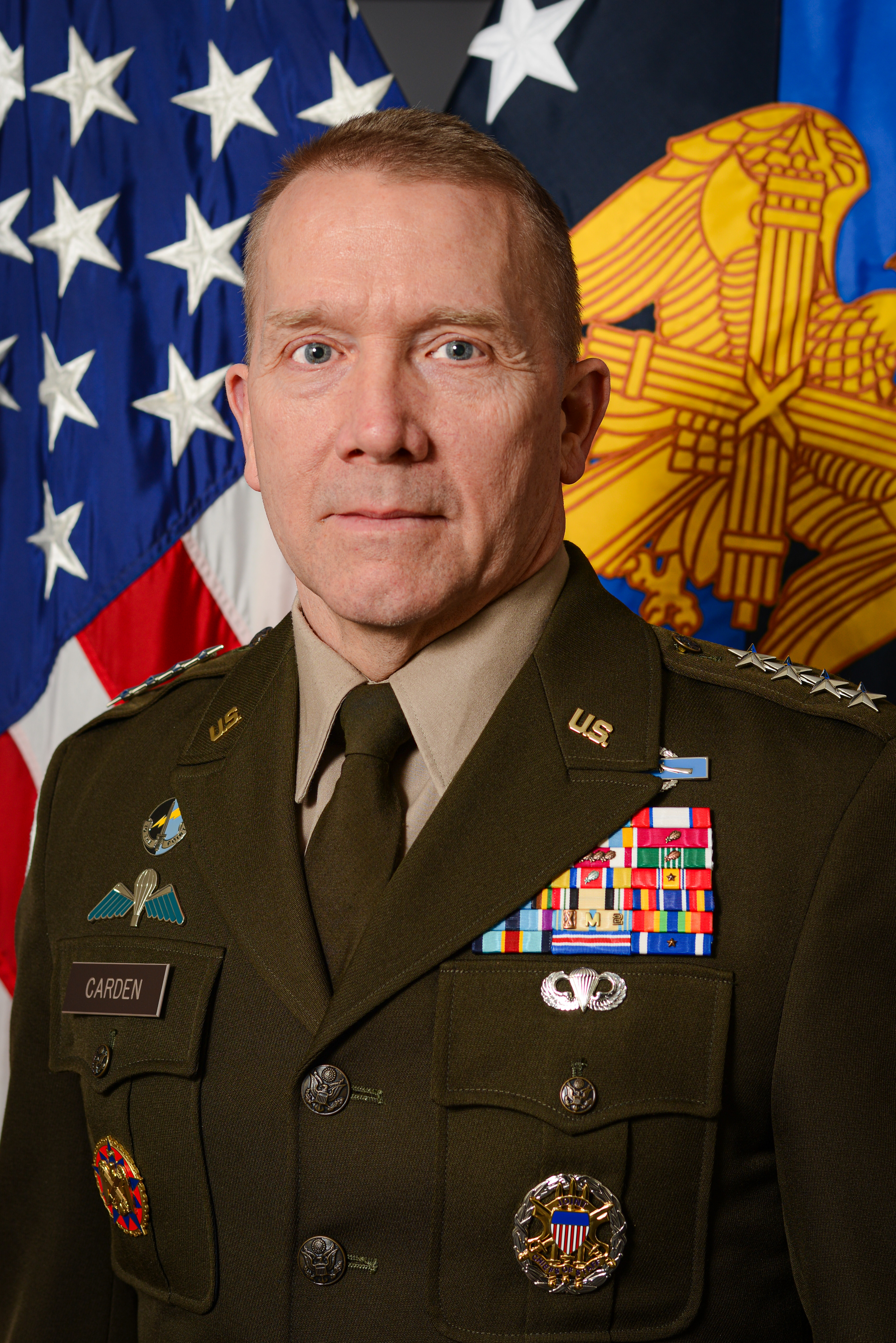
- Official portrait, 2026
- Military career
- Allegiance: United States
- Branch: United States Army; Army National Guard
- Service years: 1986–present
- Rank: General
- Commands: Vice Chief of the National Guard Bureau; Georgia National Guard; 560th Battlefield Surveillance Brigade; Georgia Army National Guard Recruiting and Retention Battalion
- Conflicts: Iraq War
- Awards: Army Distinguished Service Medal; Defense Superior Service Medal; Legion of Merit; Bronze Star Medal

Thomas M. Carden Jr. is a United States Army general who has served as the 13th vice chief of the National Guard Bureau since February 2026. He previously served as the deputy commander of United States Northern Command from May 2024 to January 2026. Prior to that, he served as the adjutant general of Georgia from 2019 to 2024, and as the deputy commander of Multi-National Division Southeast (Romania) from 2017 to 2019.

In January 2024, Carden was nominated for promotion to lieutenant general and assignment as deputy commander of the United States Northern Command and vice commander of the North American Aerospace Defense Command.

In June 2025, Carden was nominated for promotion to general and assignment as vice chief of the National Guard Bureau. His nomination was confirmed by the Senate on 12 January 2026, and assumed office on 2 February 2026.

== Awards ==
Carden's decorations include:

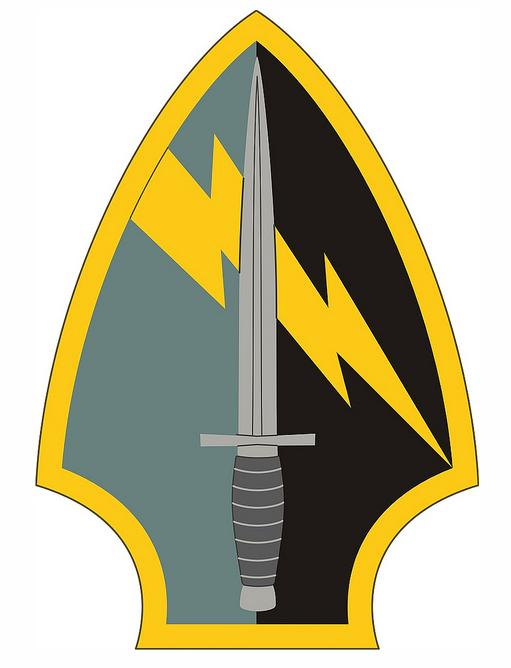
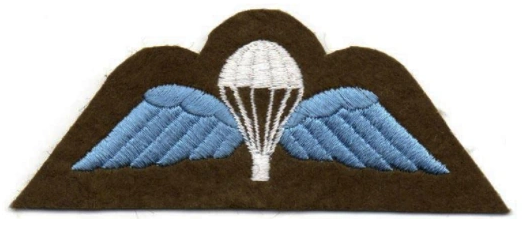

Badge	Combat Infantryman Badge		
Badge	Parachutist Badge		
1st Row	Army Distinguished Service Medal		Defense Superior Service Medal
2nd Row	Legion of Merit	Bronze Star Medal	Meritorious Service Medal with 3 oak leaf clusters
3rd Row	Army Commendation Medal with 1 oak leaf cluster	National Defense Service Medal with 1 Oak leaf cluster	Iraq Campaign Medal
4th Row	Armed Forces Expeditionary Medal	Global War on Terrorism Service Medal	Humanitarian Service Medal
5th Row	Army Service Ribbon	Army Overseas Service Ribbon	U.S. Army Reserve Components Achievement Medal with 1 silverOak leaf cluster
6th Row	Armed Forces Reserve Medal with award numeral 2	Army Reserve Components Overseas Training Ribbon	NATO Medal for service with ISAF with 1 servicestar
Badges	560th Battlefield Surveillance Brigade	British Army Parachute Badge	Two; Overseas Service Bars

Military offices
Preceded by Joseph Jarrard	Adjutant General of Georgia; 2019–2024	Succeeded by Richard D. Wilson
Preceded by A. C. Roper	Deputy Commander of the United States Northern Command; 2024–present	Incumbent
