= Mike Dumont =

United States Navy Vice admiral

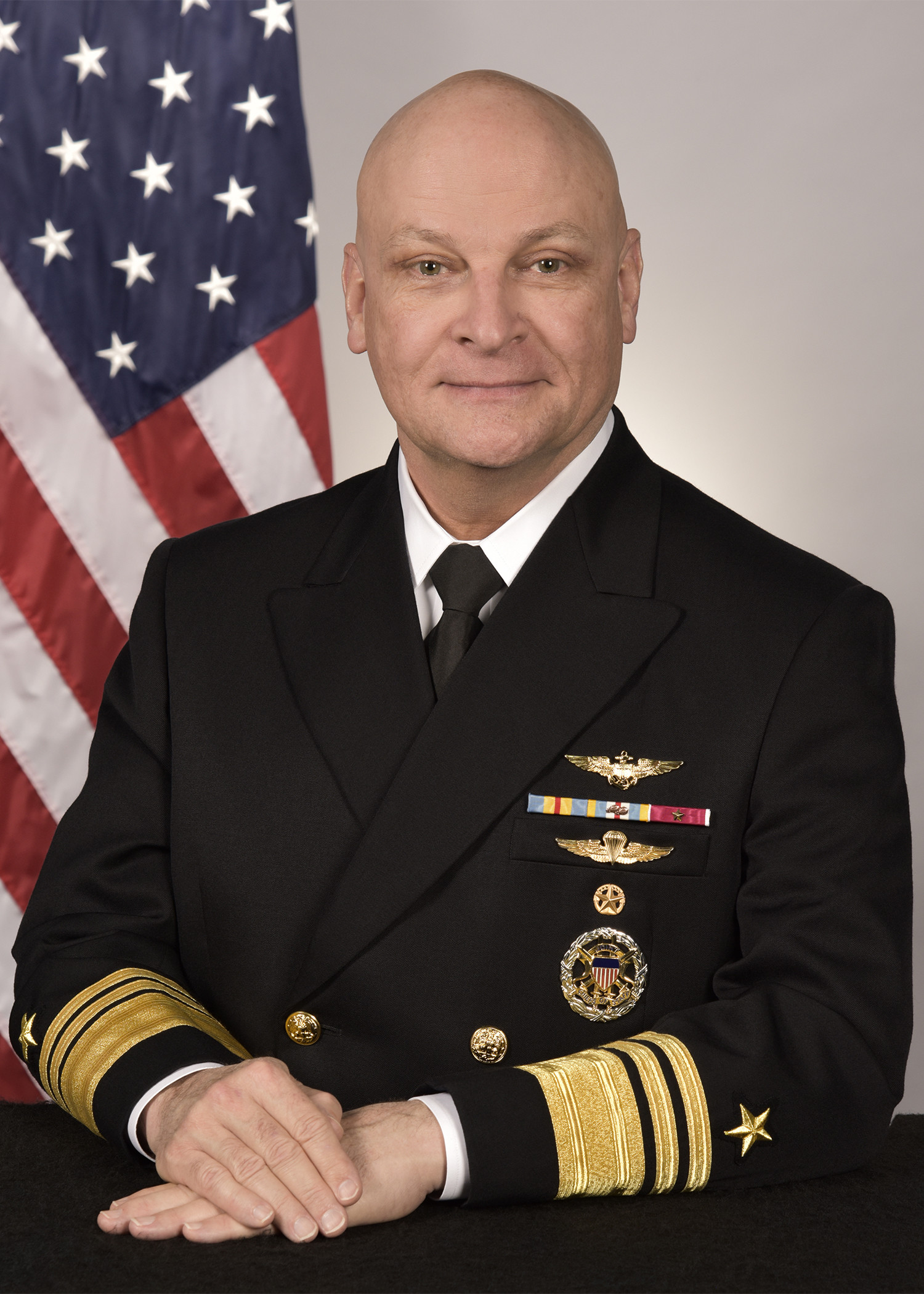
- Vice Admiral Mike Dumont, 2021

Interim President of the California State University Maritime Academy
- Incumbent
- Assumed office July 7, 2023
- Preceded by: Thomas A. Cropper

Personal details
- Born: Michael Joseph Dumont Brunswick, Maine, U.S.
- Education: University of Southern Maine (BA); National War College (MS); U.S. Army War College (MA); Suffolk University (JD)
- Awards: Defense Distinguished Service Medal; Defense Superior Service Medal (3); Legion of Merit (2)

Military service
- Allegiance: United States
- Branch/service: United States Army; United States Navy
- Rank: Vice Admiral
- Battles/wars: War in Afghanistan

Michael Joseph Dumont is an American retired flag officer, naval aviator and vice admiral in the United States Navy who last served as deputy commander of United States Northern Command and Vice Commander, U.S. Element, North American Aerospace Defense Command at Peterson Air Force Base, Colorado. Dumont served in the United States Army for five years as an aviator and paratrooper and later, he joined the United States Navy.

In 2017 or earlier, Dumont served as a vice director of Joint Chiefs of Staff at Pentagon upon his promotion to the rank of two-star rear admiral.

== Education ==
Dumont attended Brunswick High School, graduating in 1978. He received a Bachelor of Arts from the University of Southern Maine. Dumont also attended Suffolk University Law School where he completed further studies and earned a Juris Doctor degree. He attended United States Army War College and gained a Master of Science in strategic studies and later attended the National War College, gaining a master's degree in National Security Strategy.

== Military career ==
Dumont was born in Brunswick, Maine, and was commissioned in the United States Army as a second lieutenant. Before joining the United States Navy, he served five years as an army aviator and paratrooper, and later established his career associations with the United States Navy as a naval aviator. At the joint command level, he was assigned to command operational units, including a squadron. He was later appointed as a special assistant to the Supreme Allied Commander Europe and Commander of United States European Command. Dumont served as chief of staff, and defense representative to Pakistan and deputy chief of staff for stability and support operations. Later, he was assigned to joint command the NATO-led International Security Assistance Force in Afghanistan and chief of staff and deputy chief of staff for strategy, resources and plans. Besides serving at a naval component command United States Naval Forces Europe – Naval Forces Africa, he was also appointed deputy director for Political-Military Affairs. His prominent assignments include deputy director for strategic initiatives and later, vice director.

After serving at various posts, Rear Admiral Dumont was later nominated for the appointment of vice admiral rank and was subsequently appointed as the deputy commander for United States Northern Command and Vice Commander, U.S. Element, North American Aerospace Defense Command at Peterson Air Force Base, Colorado.

== University president ==
Since July 7, 2023, Dumont has served as interim President of the California State University Maritime Academy.

== Awards and decorations ==

Naval Aviator insignia
Defense Distinguished Service Medal
Defense Superior Service Medal with two bronze oak leaf clusters	Legion of Merit w/ 1 gold award star	Defense Meritorious Service Medal
Meritorious Service Medal w/ 2 award stars	Joint Service Commendation Medal	Army Commendation Medal w/ 1 oak leaf cluster
Joint Service Achievement Medal	Navy and Marine Corps Achievement Medal	Army Achievement Medal
Joint Meritorious Unit Award w/ oak leaf cluster	Navy Meritorious Unit Commendation	Navy E Ribbon
Naval Reserve Meritorious Service Medal w/ 1 bronze service star	National Defense Service Medal w/ 1 service star	Armed Forces Expeditionary Medal
Afghanistan Campaign Medal	Global War on Terrorism Expeditionary Medal	Global War on Terrorism Service Medal
Armed Forces Service Medal	Humanitarian Service Medal	Navy & Marine Corps Overseas Service Ribbon
Armed Forces Reserve Medal with silver Hourglass device, "M" device and bronze award numeral 2	NATO Medal for service with ISAF	Multinational Force and Observers Medal
Navy and Marine Corps Parachutist Insignia
Command at Sea insignia
Joint Chiefs of Staff Identification Badge

Military offices
Preceded by Jacqueline D. Van Ovost	Vice Director of the Joint Staff; 2017–2018	Succeeded by Glen D. VanHerck
Preceded by Reynold N. Hoover	Deputy Commander of the United States Northern Command; 2018–2021	Succeeded by A. C. Roper
