= A. C. Roper =

US Army General

A. C. Roper Jr.
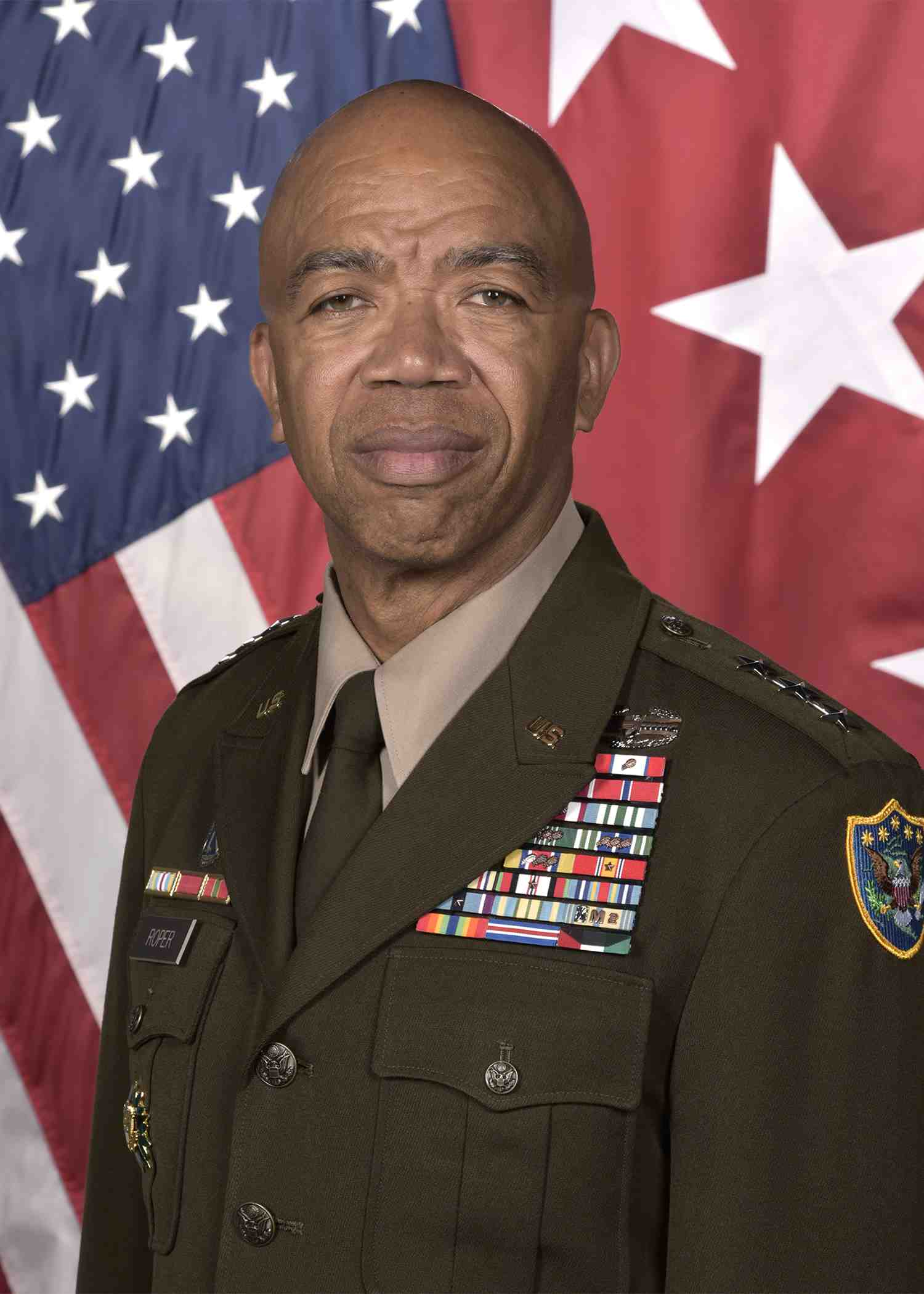
- Official portrait, 2023
- Born: Birmingham, Alabama, U.S.
- Allegiance: United States
- Branch: United States Army
- Service years: 1983–2024
- Rank: Lieutenant General
- Commands: 76th Operational Response Command; 80th Training Command; 415th CBRN Brigade
- Awards: Army Distinguished Service Medal (2); Legion of Merit (3); Bronze Star Medal; Meritorious Service Medal (4); Joint Service Commendation Medal; Combat Action Badge
- Education: United States Army War College (MSS); University of Alabama (MS)
- Spouse: Edith Roper (m. 1985)
- Police career
- Department: Montgomery Police Department (1983–1985); Hoover Police Department (1985–2007); Birmingham Police Department (2007–2017)
- Service years: 1983–1985 (MPD); 1985–2007 (HPD); 2007–2017 (BPD)
- Status: Retired
- Rank: Chief of Police (Birmingham)

A. C. Roper Jr. is a retired United States Army lieutenant general and retired police officer who last served as the deputy commander of United States Northern Command and vice commander of the American element of the North American Aerospace Defense Command from 2021 to 2024. Before that, he served as the deputy commanding general of the United States Army Reserve Command (USARC) and prior to that, as deputy chief of the United States Army Reserve.

In his civilian career, Roper was chief of the Birmingham Police Department from 2007 to 2017. Roper's promotion makes him the first black United States Army Reserve lieutenant general.

Roper graduated from Phillips High School in Birmingham, Alabama and enrolled at the University of Alabama at Birmingham. He left the university after his sophomore year to join the Montgomery Police Department. Roper eventually completed a bachelor's degree at Troy State University. He later earned an M.S. degree in criminal justice from the University of Alabama and a Master of Strategic Studies degree from the U.S. Army War College.

Police appointments
| Preceded by Annetta Nunn | Chief of the Birmingham Police Department; 2007–2017 | Succeeded by Patrick D. Smith |
Military offices
| Preceded by David J. Conboy | Deputy Chief of Army Reserve; 2017–2019 | Succeeded by Michael C. O'Guinn |
| Preceded by David J. Conboy | Deputy Commanding General of the United States Army Reserve Command; 2019–2021 | Succeeded by Gregory J. Mosser |
| Preceded by Michael J. Dumont | Deputy Commander of the United States Northern Command; 2021–2024 | Succeeded by Thomas Carden |
