= Special Operations Command North =

United States military unit

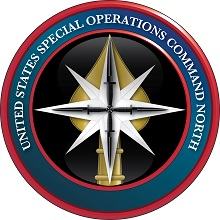
- Founded: 15 November 2013; 12 years ago (12 years, 9 months ago)
- Country: United States
- Type: Sub-Unified Command; Special operations forces
- Role: Functional combatant command
- Part of: United States Special Operations Command; United States Northern Command
- Nickname: SOCNORTH
- Website: www.northcom.mil/Mission-Partners/SOCNORTH

Commanders
- Commander: Colonel Matthew P. Tucker
- Chief of Staff: Colonel Kevin Rowlette
- Command Senior Enlisted Leader: Command Sgt. Maj. Kevin P. Dorsch

Special Operations Command North (SOCNORTH) is a sub-unified command of United States Special Operations Command (SOCOM) operationally controlled by United States Northern Command (NORTHCOM) and is tasked with command, control, and coordination of special operations throughout NORTHCOM's area of responsibility.

== History ==
Following the September 11 attacks NORTHCOM was established, within NORTHCOM a special operations division was created, later at the request of SOCOM and NORTHCOM commanders Secretary of Defense Leon Panetta created SOCNORTH
