= Joseph Jarrard =

U.S. Army general

Lieutenant General Joseph Jarrard
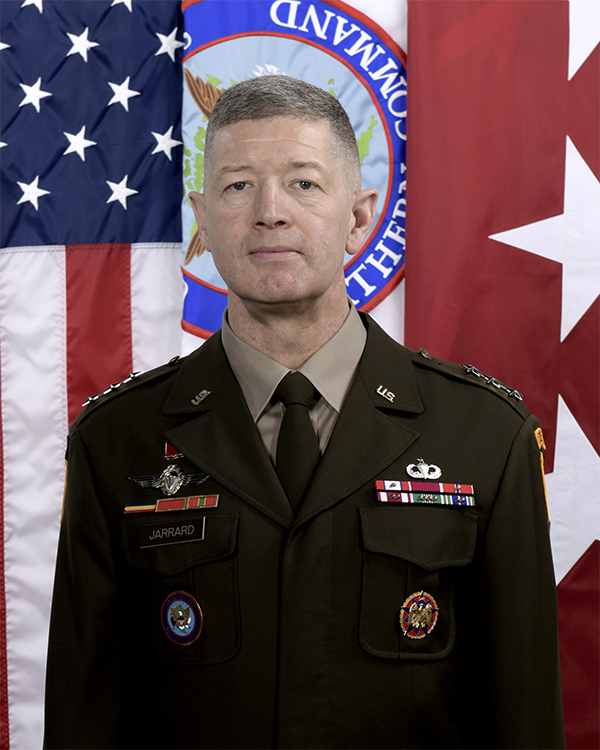
- Relatives: Lieutenant General James Jarrard (brother)
- Military career
- Allegiance: United States
- Branch: United States Army
- Service years: 1988–present
- Rank: Lieutenant General
- Commands: Georgia National Guard
- Conflicts: Iraq War
- Awards: Army Distinguished Service Medal; Legion of Merit; Bronze Star Medal (2)

Joseph F. Jarrard is a United States Army lieutenant general who is currently serving as the deputy commander of the United States Northern Command. He previously served as the Director of Operations of the National Guard Bureau from September 2022 to June 2024. He most recently served as the Deputy Commanding General for Army National Guard of the United States Army Europe and Africa from April 1, 2019, to March 25, 2022. Previously, he served as the Adjutant General of the Georgia National Guard.

Raised in Gainesville, Georgia, Jarrard graduated from North Georgia College with a Bachelor of Business Administration degree in accounting in 1988. He later earned a Master of Education degree from North Georgia College and a Master of Strategic Studies degree from the United States Army War College. His twin brother James Jarrard was an Army lieutenant general.

In July 2025, Jarrard was nominated for promotion to Lieutenant General and assignment as the deputy commander of United States Northern Command.

Military offices
Preceded by James B. Butterworth	Adjutant General of Georgia; 2015–2019	Succeeded by Thomas M. Carden Jr.
Preceded by Sean Bernabe as Deputy Commanding General of United States Army Europe	Deputy Commanding General of United States Army Europe and Africa; Acting; 2019–2021	Succeeded by Peter Andrysiak
New office	Deputy Commanding General for Army National Guard of the United States Army Europe and Africa; 2019–2022	Succeeded by Michael D. Wickman
Preceded by Steven Nordhaus	Director of Operations of the National Guard Bureau; 2022–2024	Succeeded by Ronald W. Burkett II
Preceded by Thomas Carden	Deputy Commander of the United States Northern Command; 2026–present	Incumbent
