= Joint Interagency Task Force-Counter Cartel =

- Active: January 2026–present
- Country: United States
- Part of: United States Northern Command
- Headquarters: Fort Bliss, TX
- Participating Agencies: Department of Defense; Department of Homeland Security; Department of Justice; Intelligence Community
- Engagements: War on drugs; Mexican drug war; 2026 Jalisco operation

Commanders
- Current commander: Brigadier General Maurizio Calabrese, USAF

The Joint Interagency Task Force-Counter Cartel (JIATF-CC) is a United States-led task force. The organization was created in January 2026 with the stated goal of countering Mexican cartels.

The group is commanded by a brigadier general and is based at Davis-Monthan Air Force Base in Tucson, Arizona. It is a component of the United States Northern Command. Little is known about the task force, which maintains minimal public presence. However, it is known to incorporate components from the Department of Defense, Department of Homeland Security, Department of Justice, and various agencies in the Intelligence Community. Among the group's many tasks is advising and facilitating intelligence-sharing with the government of Mexico in support of counter-cartel operations.

As of 2026, its current commander is Brigadier General Maurizio Calabrese.

== History ==
The JIATF-CC provided information to the Federal government of Mexico prior to the 2026 Jalisco operation. The operation ultimately led to the death of Jalisco New Generation Cartel leader El Mencho.

Joint Task Force North (JTF-North), a joint service command dedicated to homeland security and border support, cased its organizational colors during a ceremony hosted by Gen. Gregory Guillot, commander, North American Aerospace Defense Command and U.S. Northern Command, on June 3, 2026.

The ceremony marks the formal deactivation of the command, concluding a 37-year homeland defense mission. This transition is part of broader USNORTHCOM and Department of War (DoW) changes after new directives issued by Secretary Pete Hegseth.

To ensure seamless continuity, JTF-North’s current headquarters, personnel, and assets will transition directly to support the Joint Interagency Task Force-Counter Cartel (JIATF-CC). Officially established on Jan. 15, 2026, and headquartered in Tucson, Arizona, JIATF-CC is specifically designed to identify, disrupt, and dismantle cartel operations along the U.S.-Mexico border.
