= Louis T. Seith =

United States Air Force general (1921–2007)

Louis Theodore Seith
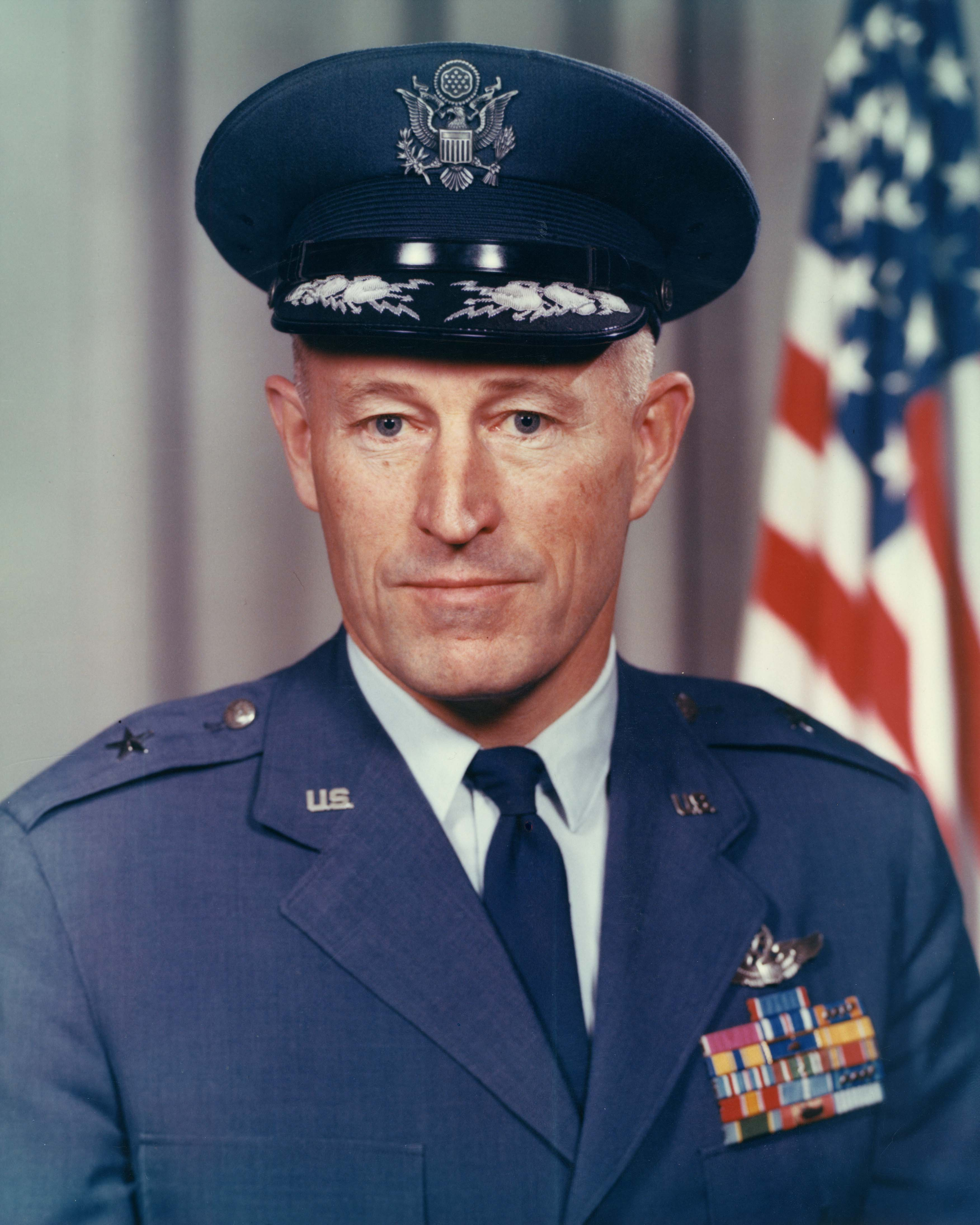
- Louis T. Seith pictured as brigadier general as Commandant of the United States Air Force Academy, c. 1960s
- Born: January 17, 1921; Quincy, Massachusetts, US
- Died: March 6, 2007 (aged 86); Sterling, Virginia, US
- Military career
- Allegiance: United States
- Branch: United States Air Force
- Service years: 1943–1977
- Rank: General
- Nickname: Ted
- Commands: 840th Bombardment Squadron; Commandant of Cadets United States Air Force Academy; Deputy Commandant United States Air Force Academy; Deputy Commander Seventh Air Force; Deputy Commander Thirteenth Air Force; United States Military Assistance Group, Thailand and Chief, Joint United States Military Advisory Group, Thailand; Chief of Staff Supreme Headquarters Allied Powers Europe
- Conflicts: World War II; Cold War; Korean War; Vietnam War

Louis Theodore Seith (January 17, 1921 – March 6, 2007) was a former general in the United States Air Force and the former Chief of Staff, Supreme Headquarters Allied Powers Europe.

== Biography ==
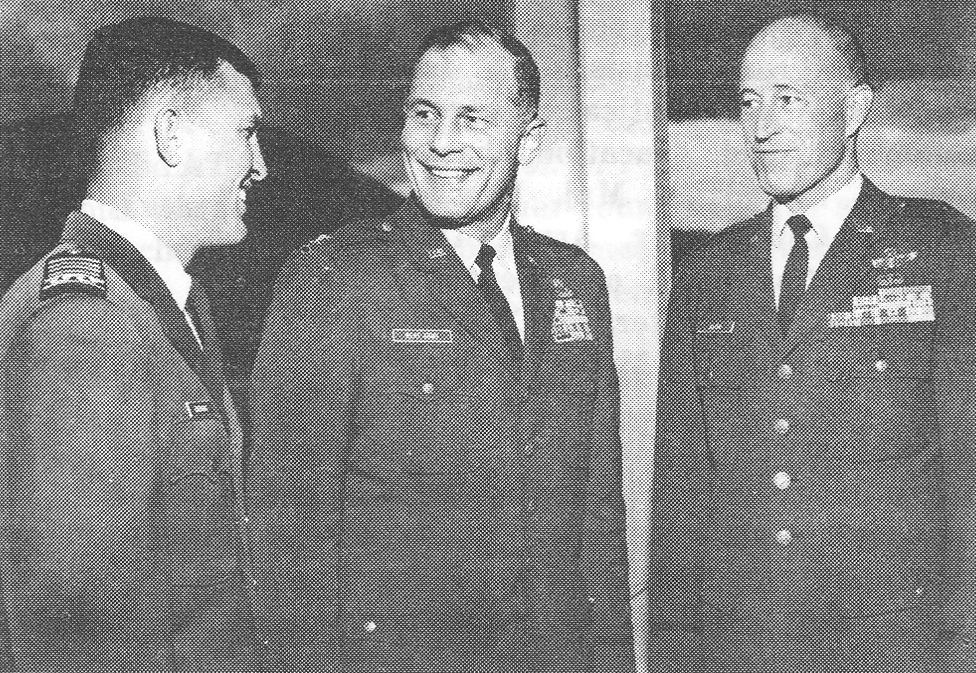
Brigadier General Seith (right) with Colonel Robin Olds (center) and Cadet Colonel Ralph Eberhart (left), 1967

Seith was born in Quincy, Massachusetts, in 1921, received his secondary education in San Diego, California, and graduated from Brown Military Academy, Pacific Beach, California, in 1938.

He entered the United States Military Academy West Point in 1939, where he played varsity football and graduated with a Bachelor of Science degree and a commission as second lieutenant in the United States Army Air Corps in 1943. He attended flying school while at the academy and received his pilot wings in 1942.

After graduation he entered B-17 Flying Fortress flight training and later joined the 483rd Bombardment Group at Tampa, Florida. He commanded the 840th Bombardment Squadron when the group went to the Mediterranean Theater of Operations, in March 1944, and became group operations officer in January 1945. He participated in the campaigns of Rome-Arno, Po Valley, Rhineland, North Apennines, Central Europe, Northern France, Southern France, and Southern Europe. He flew 52 combat missions during his World War II service.

Seith returned to the United States in August 1945 and was assigned to the United States Military Academy as a physics instructor. In 1948, he was assigned to Headquarters Tactical Air Command, Langley Air Force Base, Virginia, first as aide to Lieutenant General Elwood "Pete" Quesada and later as a member of the TAC staff. During this period, he attended the Air Tactical School.

From July 1950 to August 1953, he was an aircraft accident investigator and flight safety research plans and policy officer with the deputy inspector general, Headquarters United States Air Force. He left this assignment to attend the Air Command and Staff School which he completed in December 1953.

During the next three and one-half years, he served with the Far East Air Forces, first with the 91st Strategic Reconnaissance Squadron in Japan and later as director of fighter bomber operations, Headquarters Japan Air Defense Force. He ended his tour of duty in Japan as director of plans, Headquarters Fifth Air Force.

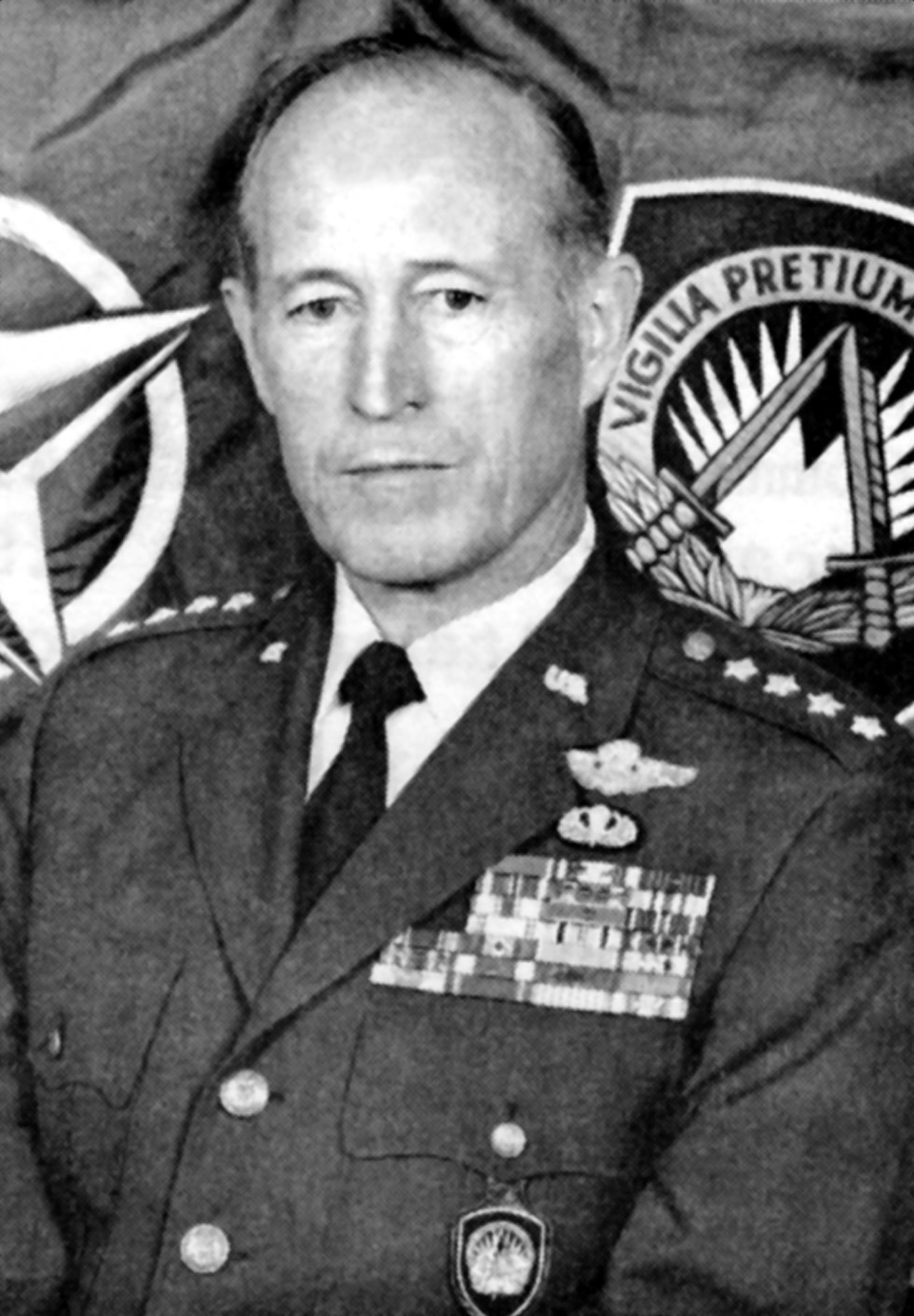
Louis T. Seith pictured as general

He joined the staff of the United States Air Force Academy in June 1957 as operations and training officer to the commandant of cadets, and became deputy commandant two years later. He left this assignment to attend the National War College, and following graduation in June 1961, he assumed command of the 414th Fighter Group, Oxnard Air Force Base, California. In July 1963, he was assigned to Headquarters United States Air Force as deputy director of education and training in the Office of the Deputy Chief of Staff For Personnel. He returned to the U.S. Air Force Academy in July 1965 and was appointed commandant of cadets.

In December 1967, he became chief of staff, Headquarters Seventh Air Force, Tan Son Nhut Air Base, Republic of Vietnam. He assumed duties as deputy commander, Seventh Air Force/Thirteenth Air Force, in June 1968. Seith became commander, United States Military Assistance Group, Thailand, and chief, Joint United States Military Advisory Group, Thailand, in May 1969.

General Seith joined the Organization of the Joint Chiefs of Staff, in August 1971 as vice director, J-3 (operations), and in July 1972 was named director for plans and policy (J-5).

In August 1974, General Seith was assigned to Supreme Headquarters Allied Powers Europe as chief of staff. He was promoted to the grade of general effective August 1, 1974, with same date of rank.

Seith died on March 6, 2007, at a retirement community in Sterling, Virginia, after suffering multiple strokes. At some point, the Air Force Aid Society named an award after him.

== Awards ==
Awards earned during his career include the:

- Distinguished Service Cross
- Air Force Distinguished Service Medal with two oak leaf clusters
- Legion of Merit with an oak leaf cluster
- Distinguished Flying Cross
- Air Medal with four oak leaf clusters
- Joint Service Commendation Medal
- Air Force Commendation Medal
- Distinguished Unit Citation emblem with oak leaf cluster
- Croix de Guerre with a palm – France
- Air Force Distinguished Service Order, 1st Class – Vietnam
- Air Gallantry Cross – Vietnam
- Knight Commander of the Most Exalted Order of the White Elephant – Thailand
- Command pilot with more than 4,300 flying hours including 261 combat hours during World War II
- Qualified parachutist, having completed the course in May 1966.
