= Reynold N. Hoover =

United States Army general

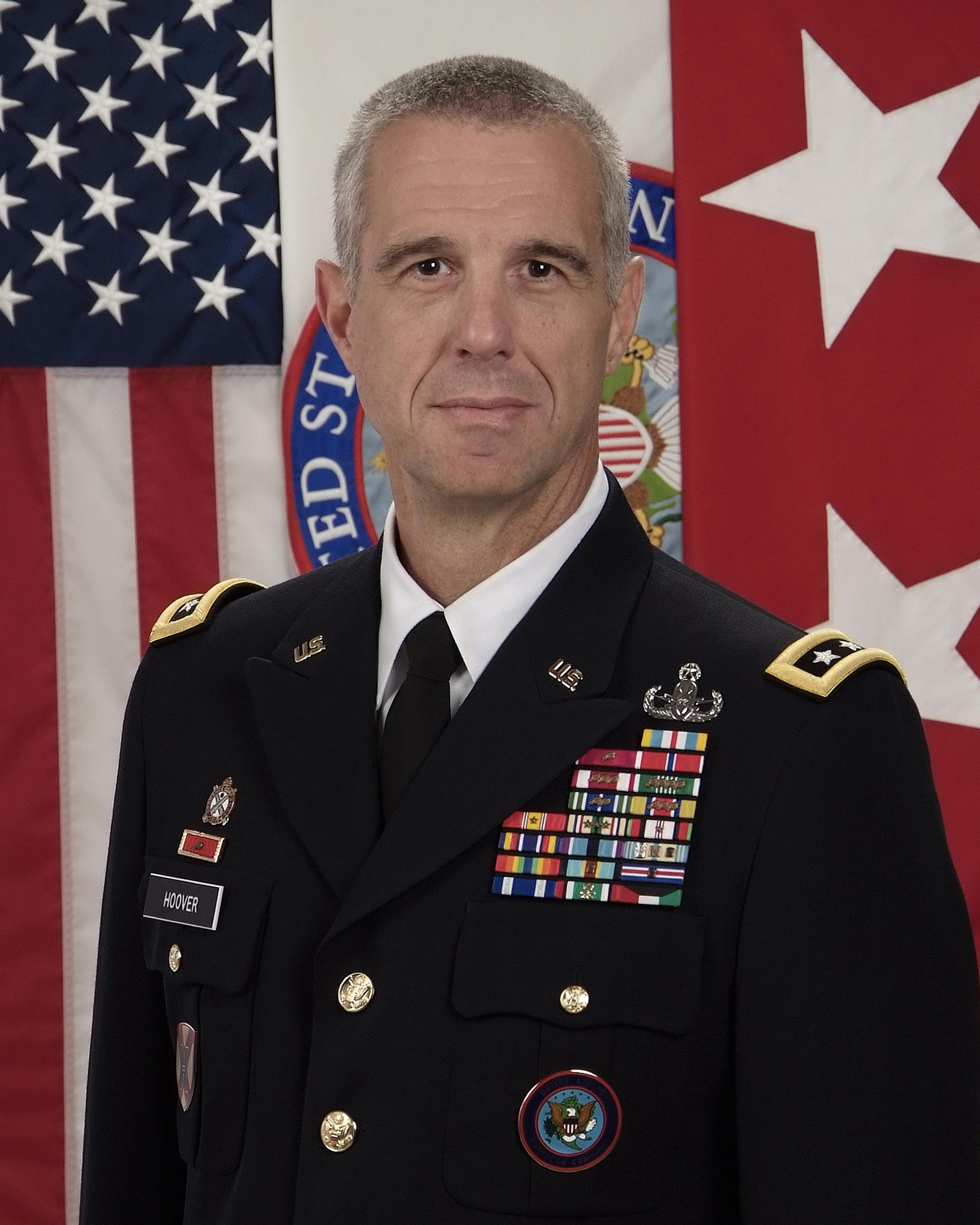
- Born: May 2, 1961 (age 65); Hartford, Connecticut, U.S.
- Military career
- Allegiance: United States
- Branch: United States Army
- Service years: 1983–2018
- Rank: Lieutenant General
- Commands: 167th Theater Sustainment Command; 135th Sustainment Command (Expeditionary); 111th Ordnance Group; 441st Ordnance Battalion
- Conflicts: Gulf War; War in Afghanistan
- Awards: Defense Superior Service Medal; Legion of Merit (2); Bronze Star Medal

Reynold Nelson Hoover (born May 2, 1961) is a retired lieutenant general of the United States Army, who served as the deputy commander of the United States Northern Command.

He is the chief executive officer of the 2028 Summer Olympics, succeeding Kathy Carter.

== Education ==
Hoover is a 1983 graduate of the United States Military Academy. He later earned a Master of Arts in Public-Private Management from Birmingham–Southern College, a Juris Doctor from the Columbus School of Law and a Master of Strategic Studies degree from the United States Army War College.

== Awards and decorations ==
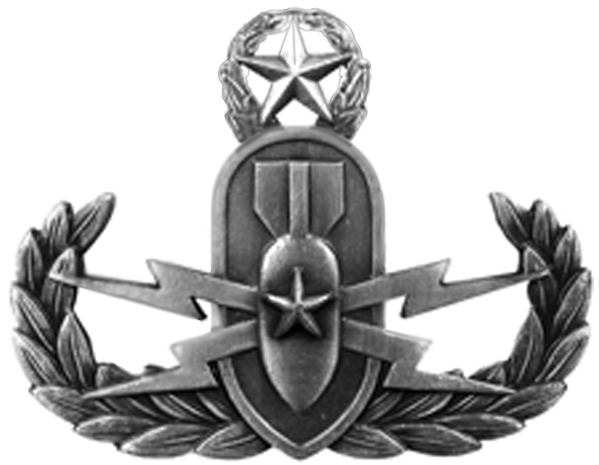
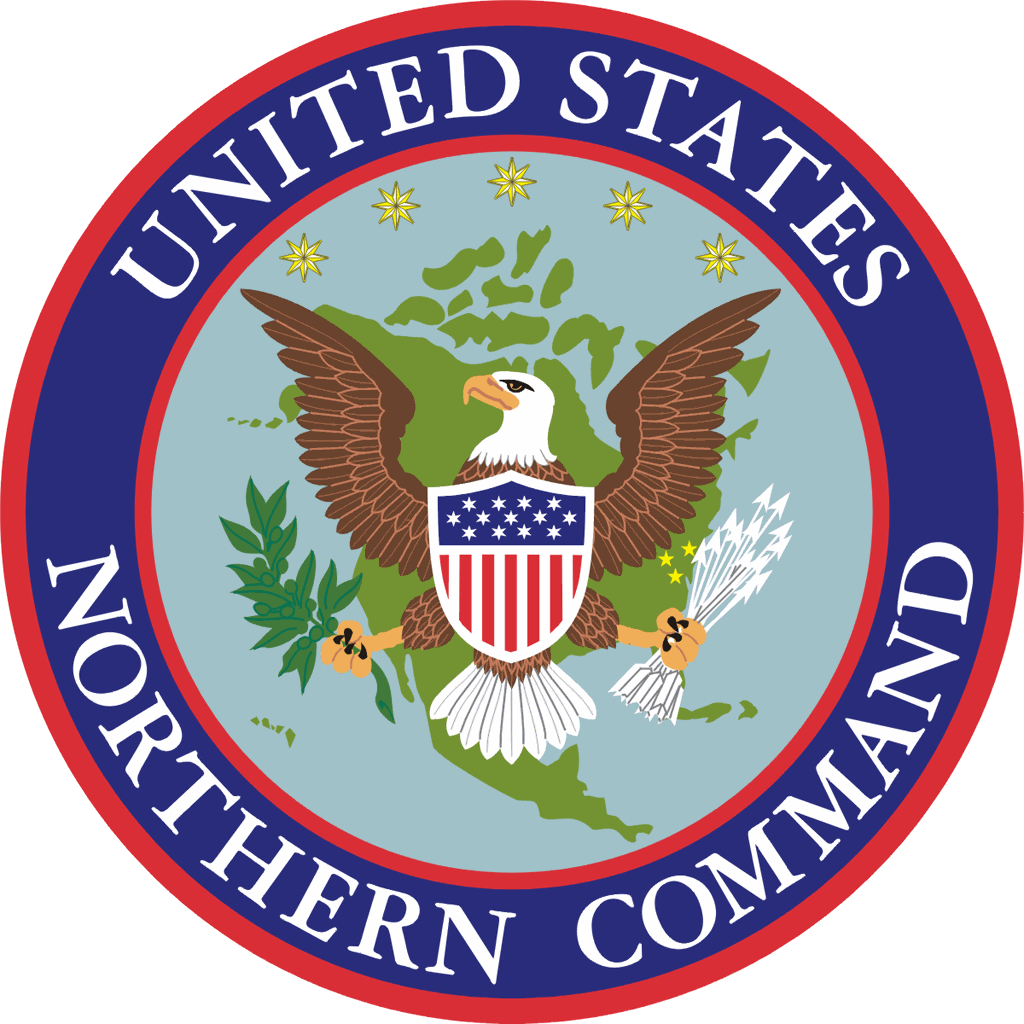
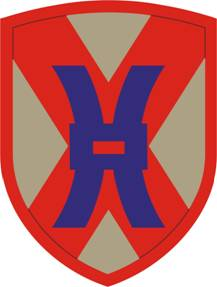
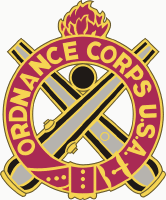
Master Explosive Ordnance Disposal Badge
United States Northern Command Badge
135th Sustainment Command (Expeditionary) Shoulder Sleeve Insignia
Army Ordnance Corps Distinctive Unit Insignia
2 Overseas Service Bars

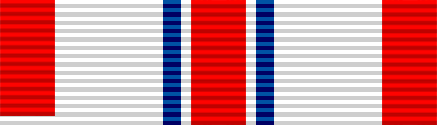
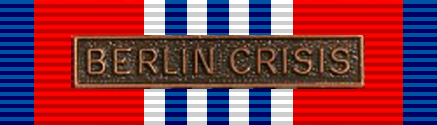
Defense Superior Service Medal
Legion of Merit with one bronze oak leaf cluster
Bronze Star Medal
Meritorious Service Medal with three oak leaf clusters
Army Commendation Medal with four oak leaf clusters
Army Achievement Medal with two oak leaf clusters
Army Meritorious Unit Commendation with oak leaf cluster
Army Reserve Component Achievement Medal with three oak leaf clusters
National Defense Service Medal with one bronze service star
Southwest Asia Service Medal with three service stars
Afghanistan Campaign Medal with service star
Global War on Terrorism Service Medal
Humanitarian Service Medal
Armed Forces Reserve Medal with silver Hourglass device, "M" device and bronze award numeral 2
Army Service Ribbon
Army Overseas Service Ribbon with bronze numeral 2
Army Reserve Overseas Training Ribbon with bronze numeral 5
NATO Medal for service with ISAF
Kuwait Liberation Medal (Saudi Arabia)
Kuwait Liberation Medal (Kuwait)
Alabama Distinguished Service Medal
Alabama Operation Desert Storm Ribbon with device
Unidentified award
Alabama National Emergency Service Medal
Alabama Faithful Service Medal with device

Military offices
Preceded by Daniel R. Hokanson	Deputy Commander of the United States Northern Command; 2016–2018	Succeeded by Mike Dumont
