= Maurizio Calabrese =

U.S. Air Force General

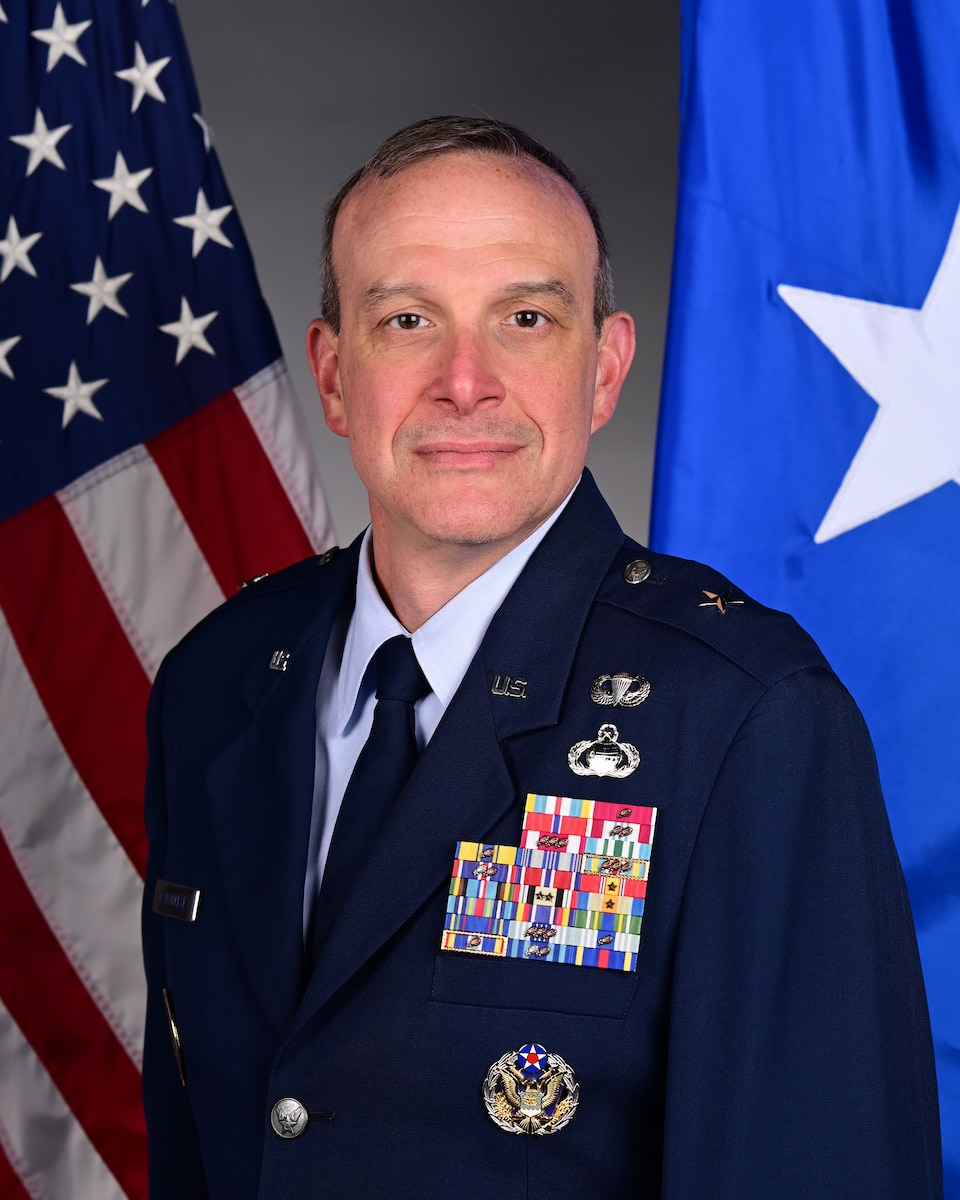
- Official Portrait
- Education: U.S. Air Force Academy, (B.S.); Naval Postgraduate School, (M.A.); National Intelligence University, (M.S.)
- Military career
- Allegiance: United States
- Branch: United States Air Force
- Service years: 1996-present
- Rank: Brigadier General
- Commands: 544th Intelligence, Surveillance and Reconnaissance Group; National Air and Space Intelligence Center; Joint Interagency Task Force-Counter Cartel
- Deployments: Operation Southern Watch; Operation Iraqi Freedom; Operation Inherent Resolve; Operation Enduring Sentinel
- Awards: Legion of Merit; Bronze Star Medal; Defense Meritorious Service Medal; Meritorious Service Medal; Defense Superior Service Medal; Joint Service Commendation Medal; Air and Space Achievement Medal

Maurizio D. Calabrese is a United States Air Force brigadier general who currently commands the Joint Interagency Task Force-Counter Cartel. A career intelligence officer, Calabrese has served in various intelligence, special operations, and counter-terrorism roles, including as intelligence director of NORAD and as commander of the National Air and Space Intelligence Center.

== Early Air Force career ==
Calabrese began his career as a student in the U.S. Air Force Academy, and was commissioned as a second lieutenant upon graduation in 1996. He completed intelligence training and became chief of intelligence for the 38th Reconnaissance Squadron and later the 4407th Reconnaissance Squadron. He later graduated from the Naval Postgraduate School and returned to the Air Force Academy to serve as a world history instructor.

After graduating from National Intelligence University, Calabrese served in a variety of positions, including roles under the Deputy Chief of Staff for Intelligence at Headquarters Air Force, commander of the 402nd Intelligence Squadron, and led frontline intelligence efforts during Operation Inherent Resolve.

In 2018, Calabrese became commander of the 544th Intelligence, Surveillance, and Reconnaissance Group. He served in that position for two years before assuming command of the National Air and Space Intelligence Center. In 2023, he became the director of intelligence for NORAD and NORTHCOM. Additionally, he served as deputy commanding general of special operations of Joint-Task Force Central at Al Udeid AFB in Qatar.

== Commander, Joint Interagency Task Force-Counter Cartel ==
Following the second inauguration of Donald Trump, substantial government and military resources were allocated to the US-Mexico border. In 2026, Calabrese became the first commanding general of the newly established Joint Interagency Task Force-Counter Cartel (JITF-CC). In this role, he oversees a large interagency group with an anti-cartel focus. Little is known about the group, and it maintains minimal public presence.

In February 2026, Calabrese and the JITF-CC were involved in the Jalisco Operation which ultimately led to the death of Jalisco New Generation Cartel leader Nemesio "El Mencho" Oseguera Cervantes. The group is believed to have assisted in providing intelligence to Mexico, contributing to the eventual success of the operation.

== Effective dates of promotions ==
Rank	Date
Second Lieutenant	May 29, 1996
First Lieutenant	May 29, 1998
Captain	May 29, 2000
Major	April 1, 2006
Lieutenant Colonel	June 1, 2011
Colonel	September 1, 2017
Brigadier General	August 2, 2023
