= James Jarrard =

U.S. Army general

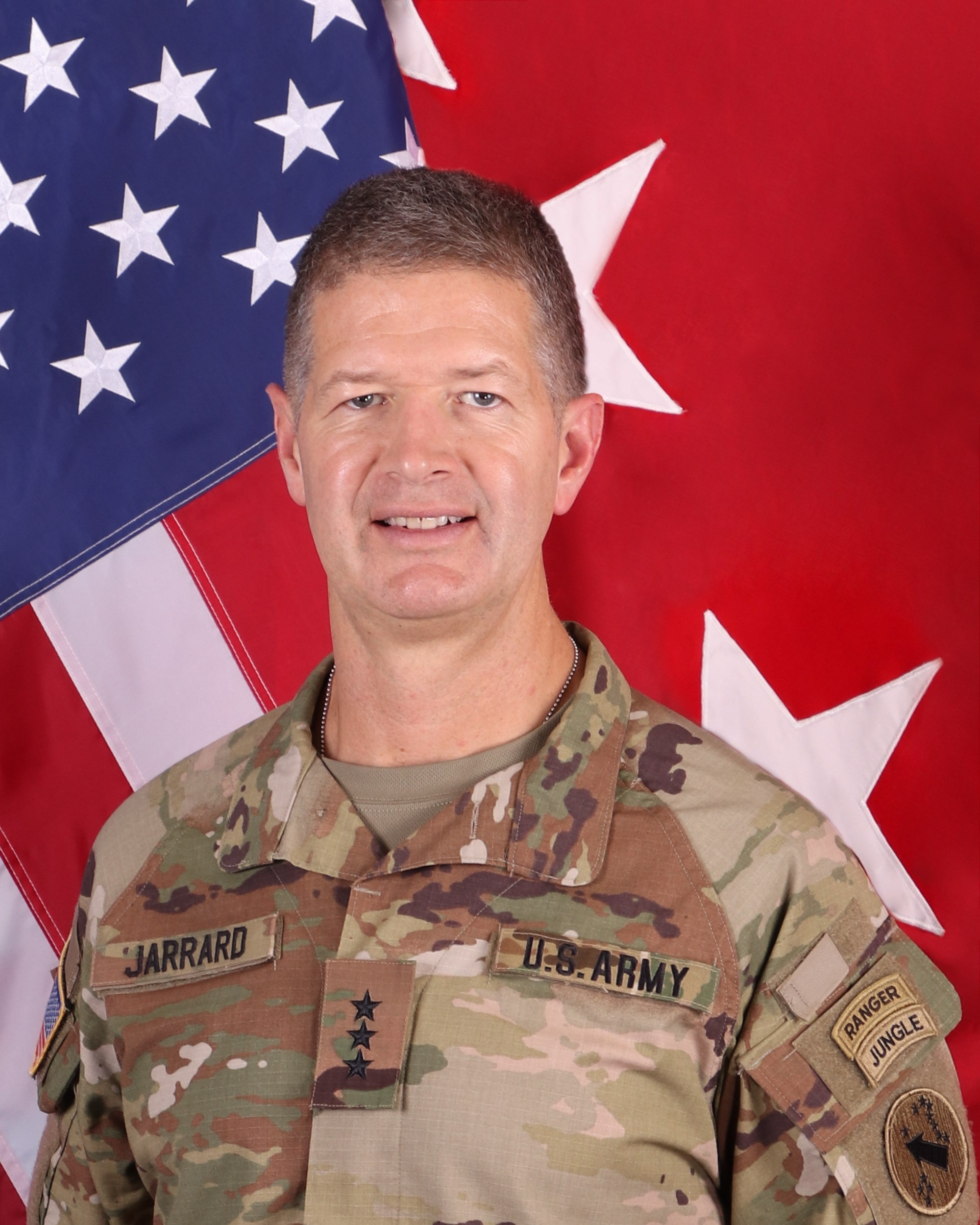
- Official portrait, 2022
- Born: Germany
- Relatives: Lieutenant General Joseph Jarrard (brother)
- Military career
- Allegiance: United States
- Branch: United States Army
- Service years: 1988–2024
- Rank: Lieutenant General
- Commands: 25th Infantry Division; Special Operations Joint Task Force-Operation Inherent Resolve; Delta Force
- Conflicts: Gulf War; War in Afghanistan; Iraq War; Operation Inherent Resolve
- Awards: Defense Superior Service Medal (5); Legion of Merit; Bronze Star Medal (4)

James B. Jarrard is a retired United States Army lieutenant general who last served as the deputy commanding general of United States Army Pacific from 2022 to 2024. He most recently served as the chief of staff of the United States Indo-Pacific Command from 2021 to 2022, succeeding Ronald P. Clark. Previously, he served as the Director of Operations of the United States Special Operations Command.

== Early life ==
Born in Germany and raised in Gainesville, Georgia, Jarrard graduated from North Georgia College with a Bachelor of Business Administration degree in 1988. His twin brother Joseph Jarrard is an Army lieutenant general.

== Military career ==
Jarrard served in the Army National Guard while at UNG, then commissioned and entered active duty in May 1988 as a second lieutenant. Jarrard served as platoon leader with 7th Battalion, 6th Infantry Regiment, 1st Armored Division, in Germany and deployed during Operation Desert Storm in Kuwait. He then served at the 5th Ranger Training Battalion at Fort Benning, Georgia. He completed numerous specialized courses including Basic Airborne Course and Army Ranger Course at Fort Benning and Air Assault School located at Fort Campbell, Kentucky. Jarrard received assignment to 25th Infantry Division at Schofield Barracks, Hawaii where he served as company commander with 2nd Battalion, 27th Infantry Regiment and later Assistant S3 with 3rd Brigade. In 2001, Jarrard volunteered for and completed a specialized selection course and operator training course for assignment to 1st Special Forces Operational Detachment – Delta (1st SFOD-D), publicly known as Delta Force, at Fort Bragg, where he held numerous leadership positions including squadron operations officer, troop commander, executive officer, squadron commander and unit commander. Jarrard planned, rehearsed and operated during classified operations overseas and deployed in support of multiple combat operations including Operation Uphold Democracy, Operation Enduring Freedom, Operation Iraqi Freedom.

Jarrard was Senior Service College Fellow at the George C. Marshall European Center for Security Studies from 2010 to 2011. Jarrard earned a Master of Science degree in military operational art and science from Air Command and Staff College at Maxwell Air Force Base in Montgomery, Alabama. He succeeded Mark J. O'Neil as commander of Delta Force, and was in that role until 2013, when he was succeeded by Chris Donahue.

Jarrard served various command and staff assignments including deputy commanding general for operations, 7th Infantry Division from 2014 to 2015, Director, Pakistan and Afghanistan Coordination Cell, J-5, Joint Staff from July 2015 to July 2017, Commander of Special Operation Joint Task Force Operation Inherent Resolve from Sept 2017 to July 2018, Director of Operations, J3, Joint Special Operations from 2018 to 2019, Commanding General of the 25th Infantry Division from 2019 to 2021, then as the Chief of Staff, US INDOPACOM at Camp Smith, Hawaii.

=== Dates of rank ===
Promotions
Brigadier general	December 2, 2014
Major general	February 2, 2018
Lieutenant general	May 26, 2022

== Awards and decorations ==
U.S. military decorations
Defense Superior Service Medal with one bronze oak leaf cluster
Legion of Merit with oak leaf cluster
Bronze Star Medal with three oak leaf clusters
Defense Meritorious Service Medal with two oak leaf clusters
Meritorious Service Medal with oak leaf cluster
Joint Service Commendation Medal with oak leaf cluster
Army Commendation Medal with three oak leaf clusters
Army Achievement Medal with oak leaf cluster
U.S. Unit Awards
Presidential Unit Citation
Joint Meritorious Unit Award
Meritorious Unit Commendation with four oak leaf clusters
U.S. Service (Campaign) Medals and Service and Training Ribbons
National Defense Service Medal with one bronze service star
Afghanistan Campaign Medal with bronze service star
Iraq Campaign Medal with bronze service star
Inherent Resolve Campaign Medal with service star
Global War on Terrorism Expeditionary Medal
Global War on Terrorism Service Medal
Army Service Ribbon
Army Overseas Service Ribbon with bronze award numeral 4
NATO Medal for service with ISAF
Kuwait Liberation Medal (Saudi Arabia)
Kuwait Liberation Medal (Kuwait)

Badges
	Combat Infantryman Badge
	Expert Infantryman Badge
	Ranger Tab
	Master Parachutist Badge
	Military Free Fall Parachutist Badge
	Air Assault Badge
	German Parachutist badge in bronze
	Joint Chiefs of Staff Identification Badge
75th Ranger Regiment	Combat Service Identification Badge
	6 Overseas Service Bars

Military offices
Preceded by Mark J. O'Neil	Commander of Delta Force; 2011–2013	Succeeded by Chris Donahue
Preceded by ???	Deputy Commanding General for Operations of the 7th Infantry Division; 2014–2015	Succeeded by Antonio Aguto
Preceded by James E. Kraft	Commanding General of Special Operations Joint Task Force-Operation Inherent Resolve; 2017–2018	Succeeded by Patrick B. Roberson
Preceded by Clayton M. Hutmacher	Director of Operations of the United States Special Operations Command; 2018–2019	Succeeded by Vincent Becklund
Preceded by Ronald P. Clark	Commanding General of the 25th Infantry Division; 2019–2021	Succeeded by Joseph A. Ryan
Preceded by Ronald P. Clark	Chief of Staff of the United States Indo-Pacific Command; 2021–2022	Succeeded by Joshua M. Rudd
Preceded by Matthew W. McFarlane	Deputy Commanding General of United States Army Pacific; 2022–2024	Succeeded by Joel B. Vowell
