= Ralph Eberhart =

US Air Force general

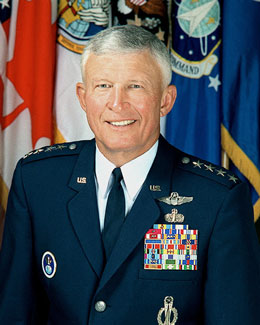
- General Ralph E. "Ed" Eberhart
- Born: December 6, 1946 (age 79); Nevada, Missouri, U.S.
- Military career
- Allegiance: United States
- Branch: United States Air Force
- Service years: 1968–2005
- Rank: General
- Commands: North American Aerospace Defense Command; United States Northern Command; United States Space Command; Air Combat Command; Vice Chief of Staff of the United States Air Force; U.S. Forces Japan; Fifth Air Force; 363rd Tactical Fighter Wing; 10th Tactical Fighter Squadron
- Conflicts: Vietnam War; Gulf War
- Awards: Defense Distinguished Service Medal (2); Air Force Distinguished Service Medal (2); Legion of Merit (2); Distinguished Flying Cross

Ralph Edward "Ed" Eberhart (born December 6, 1946) is a retired four-star general in the United States Air Force (USAF). He served as the commander of North American Aerospace Defense Command (NORAD) and United States Northern Command, Peterson Air Force Base, Colorado. He was in charge of NORAD during the September 11 attacks in 2001.

== Biography ==
Eberhart entered the USAF in 1968 as a graduate of the United States Air Force Academy, having been the cadet wing commander during his senior year.

A command pilot, General Eberhart has logged more than 5,000 hours, primarily in fighter and trainer aircraft, including 300 combat missions as a forward air controller in the Vietnam War.

While commander of the 363rd Tactical Fighter Wing during Operation Desert Shield, the unit established the theater's initial air-to-ground combat capability from a forward operating location.

While he was lieutenant general in January 1996, Eberhart produced a novel concept in operational doctrine: "that a joint force commander could profitably use his air component to attack deep battle targets or at the start of an expeditionary operation before ground forces were in place." Chief of Staff of the Air Force general Ronald Fogleman embraced this doctrine, saying in April 1996: "The need for mass on the battlefield has now changed. We don’t need to occupy an enemy’s country to defeat his strategy. We can reduce his combat capabilities and in many instances defeat his armed forces from the air."

Eberhart's staff experience includes serving as executive officer to the Chief of Staff of the Air Force at Headquarters USAF; Deputy Chief of Staff for Inspection, Safety and Security, Headquarters Tactical Air Command; Director for Programs and Evaluation, Headquarters USAF; Director of Force Structure, Resources and Assessment, the Joint Staff; and Deputy Chief of Staff for Plans and Operations, Headquarters USAF. The general has also served as Vice Chief of Staff of the Air Force, commander, Air Combat Command, Commander, Air Force Space Command, and as commander-in-chief, United States Space Command.

Eberhart has commanded a flight, squadron, wing, numbered air force and two major commands, as well as one sub-unified command, two unified commands and one bi-national command.

Eberhart's international awards include the Grand Cordon of the Order of the Sacred Treasure, presented while serving as the Commander of United States Forces Japan, by the Emperor of Japan, as well as the French Legion of Honor.

== Education ==
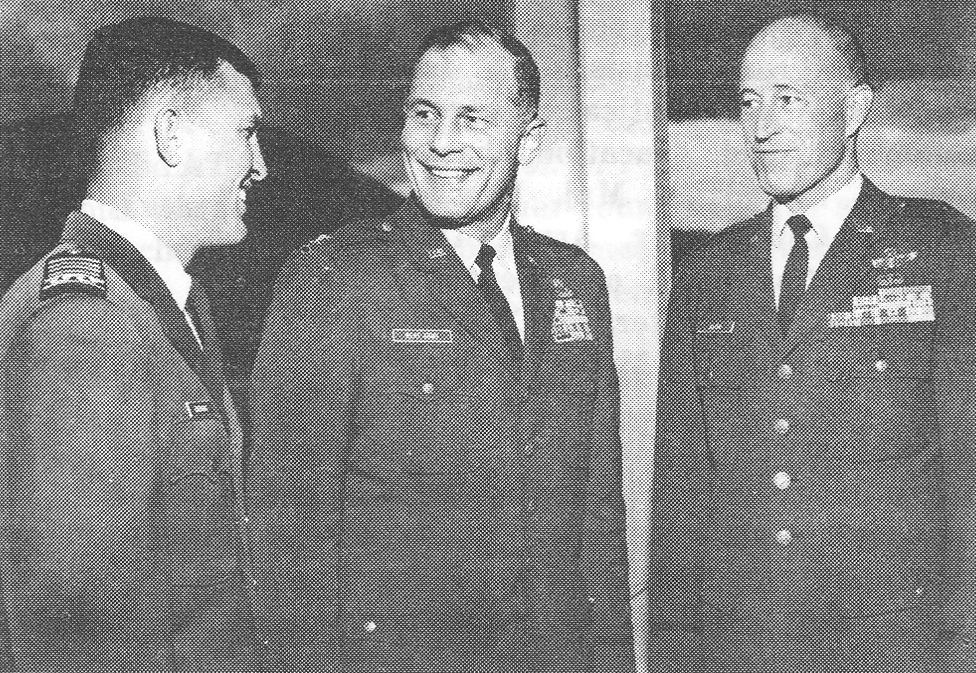
As Cadet Colonel (left) commanding the Cadet Wing at the United States Air Force Academy, with Colonel Robin Olds (center) and Brigadier General Louis T. Seith, 1967

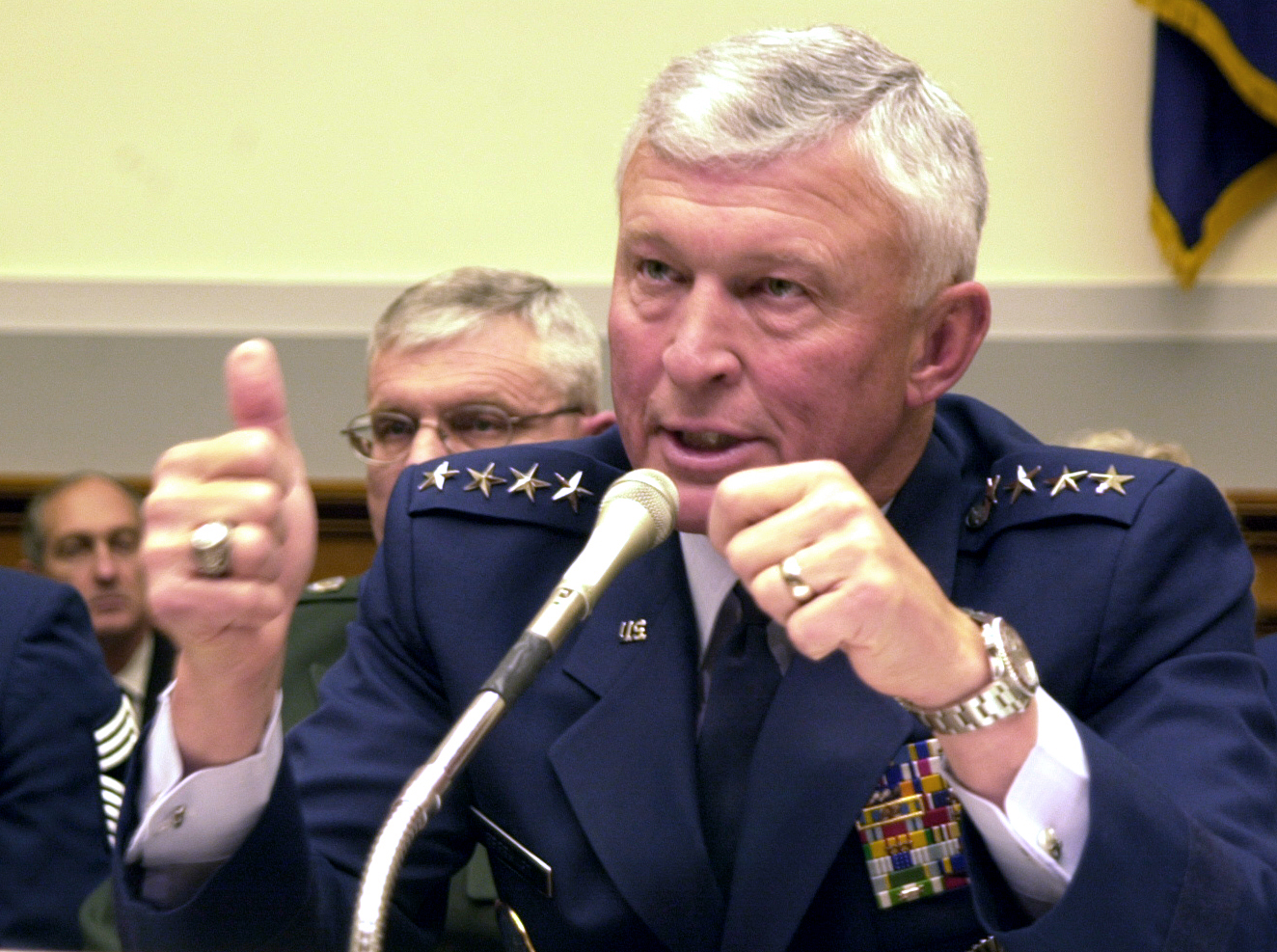
General Eberhart in 2003

- 1964 McCluer High School, Florissant, Missouri
- 1968 Bachelor of Science degree in political science, United States Air Force Academy, Colorado Springs, Colorado
- 1973 Squadron Officer School, Maxwell AFB, Alabama, by correspondence
- 1974 Air Command and Staff College, Maxwell AFB, Alabama, by correspondence
- 1977 Master's degree in political science, Troy State University
- 1987 National War College, Fort Lesley J. McNair, Washington, D.C.

== Assignments ==
- August 1968 – August 1969, student, Undergraduate Pilot Training, 615th Student Squadron, Air Training Command, Craig AFB, Alabama
- February 1970 – December 1970, forward air controller, 20th Tactical Air Support Squadron, Pleiku Air Base, South Vietnam
- December 1970 – June 1974, T-38 Talon instructor pilot, assistant flight commander, flight commander and headquarters squadron commander, 71st Flying Training Wing, Vance AFB, Oklahoma
- June 1974 – June 1975, resource manager, Air Staff Training Program, Special Category Management Section, Rated Career Management Branch, Headquarters Air Force Military Personnel Center, Randolph AFB, Texas
- December 1975 – February 1977, F-4E Phantom II flight commander and instructor pilot, 525th Tactical Fighter Squadron, Bitburg AB, West Germany
- February 1977 – December 1978, F-4E instructor pilot, standardization and evaluation flight examiner, and assistant Chief, Standardization and Evaluation, 50th Tactical Fighter Wing, Hahn AB, West Germany
- January 1979 – July 1980, action officer, Readiness Initiative Group, Directorate of Operations, later, Chief, Executive Committee, Air Force Budget Issues Team, Directorate of Plans, Congressional and External Affairs Division, Headquarters U.S. Air Force, Washington, D.C.
- July 1980 – June 1982, aide to the Commander in Chief, Headquarters United States Air Forces in Europe, and Commander, Allied Air Forces Central Europe, Ramstein AB, West Germany
- September 1982 – May 1984, commander, 10th Tactical Fighter Squadron, later, Assistant Deputy Commander for Operations, 50th Tactical Fighter Wing, Hahn AB, West Germany
- May 1984 – July 1986, executive officer to the Air Force Chief of Staff, Headquarters U.S. Air Force, Washington, D.C.
- July 1986 – July 1987, student, National War College, Fort Lesley J. McNair, Washington, D.C.
- July 1987 – October 1990, vice commander, later, commander, 363rd Tactical Fighter Wing, Shaw AFB, South Carolina
- October 1990 – February 1991, Deputy Chief of Staff for Inspection, Safety and Security, Headquarters Tactical Air Command, Langley AFB, Virginia
- February 1991 – February 1994, director, Directorate of Programs and Evaluation, Headquarters U.S. Air Force, Washington, D.C.
- February 1994 – June 1995, director, Force Structure, Resources and Assessment, the Joint Staff, Washington, D.C.
- June 1995 – June 1996, Deputy Chief of Staff for Plans and Operations, Headquarters U.S. Air Force, Washington, D.C.
- June 1996 – June 1997, commander, U.S. Forces, Japan, and Commander, 5th Air Force, Yokota AB, Japan
- July 1997 – June 1999, vice chief of staff, Headquarters U.S. Air Force, Washington, D.C.
- June 1999 – February 2000, commander, Air Combat Command, Langley AFB, Virginia
- February 2000 – April 2002, commander in chief, North American Aerospace Defense Command and U.S. Space Command; commander, Air Force Space Command; and Department of Defense Manager for Manned Space Flight Support Operations, Peterson AFB, Colorado
- April 2002 – October 2002, commander in Chief, North American Aerospace Defense Command and U.S. Space Command, and Department of Defense Manager for Manned Space Flight Support Operations, Peterson AFB, Colorado
- October 2002 – January 1, 2005, commander, North American Aerospace Defense Command and USNORTHCOM (as U.S. Space Command by then ceased to exist and merged into USSTRATCOM), Peterson AFB, Colorado

== Flight information ==
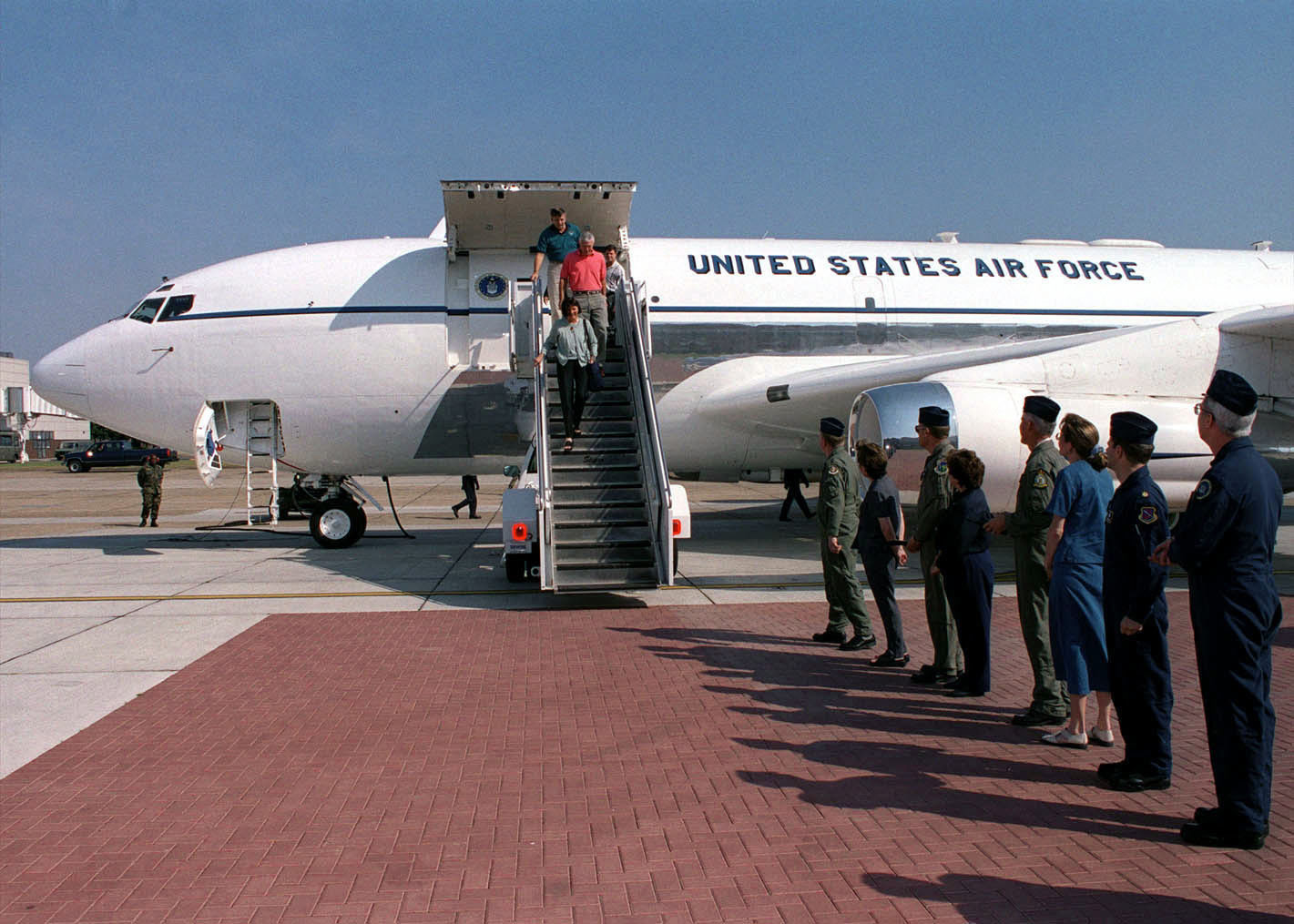
Commander of the North American Aerospace Defense Command General Ralph E. Eberhart arrived at RAF Mildenhall.

- Rating: Command Pilot
- Flight hours: More than 5,000 hours
- Aircraft flown: O-2, T-38, T-39, F-4E, RF-4C, F-16, F-15, C-21 and C-37

== Awards and decorations ==
- U.S. Air Force Command Pilot Badge
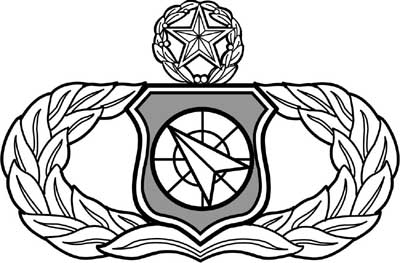
- Command Space and Missile Operations Badge
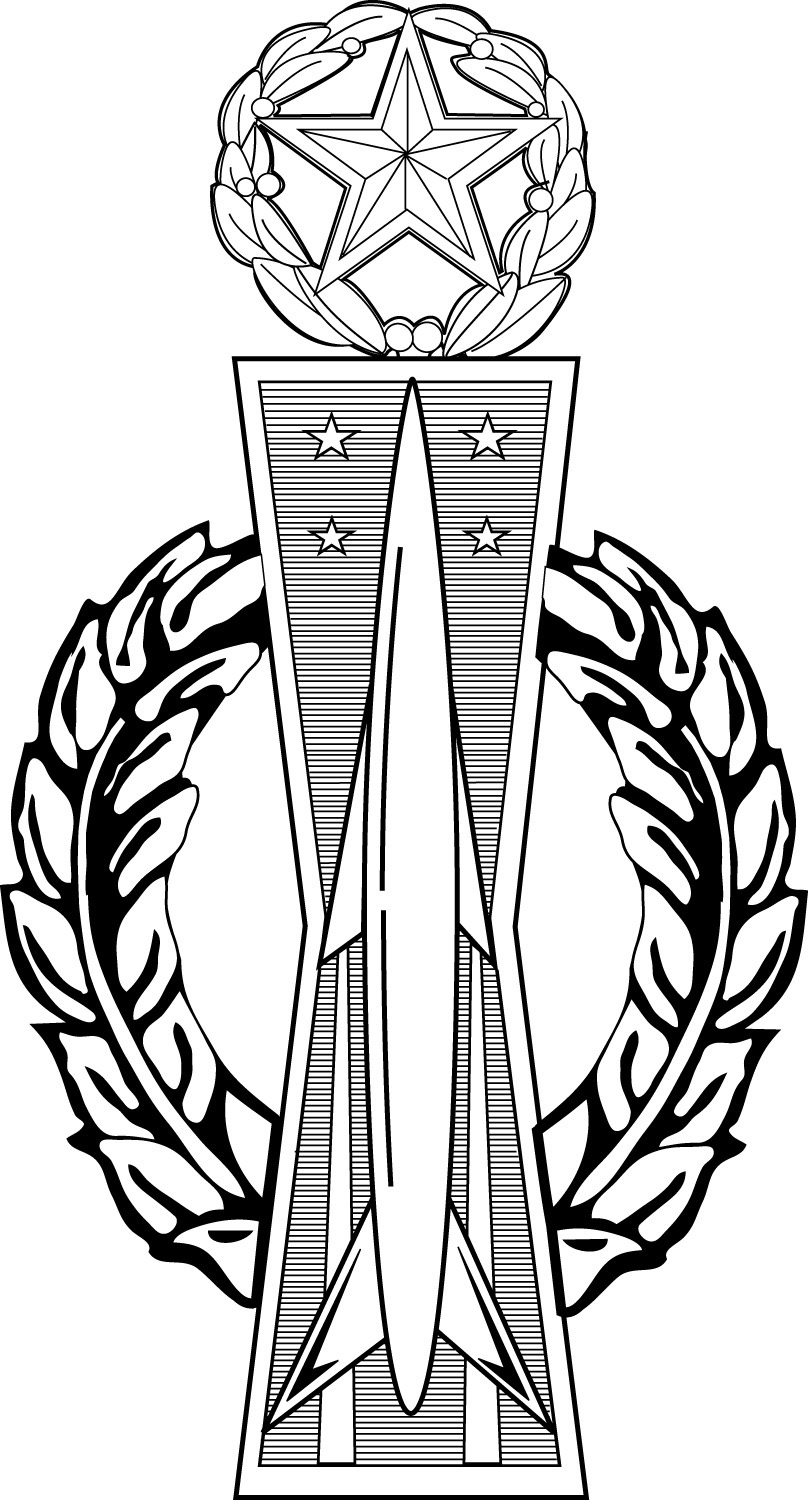
- Command Missile Operations Badge
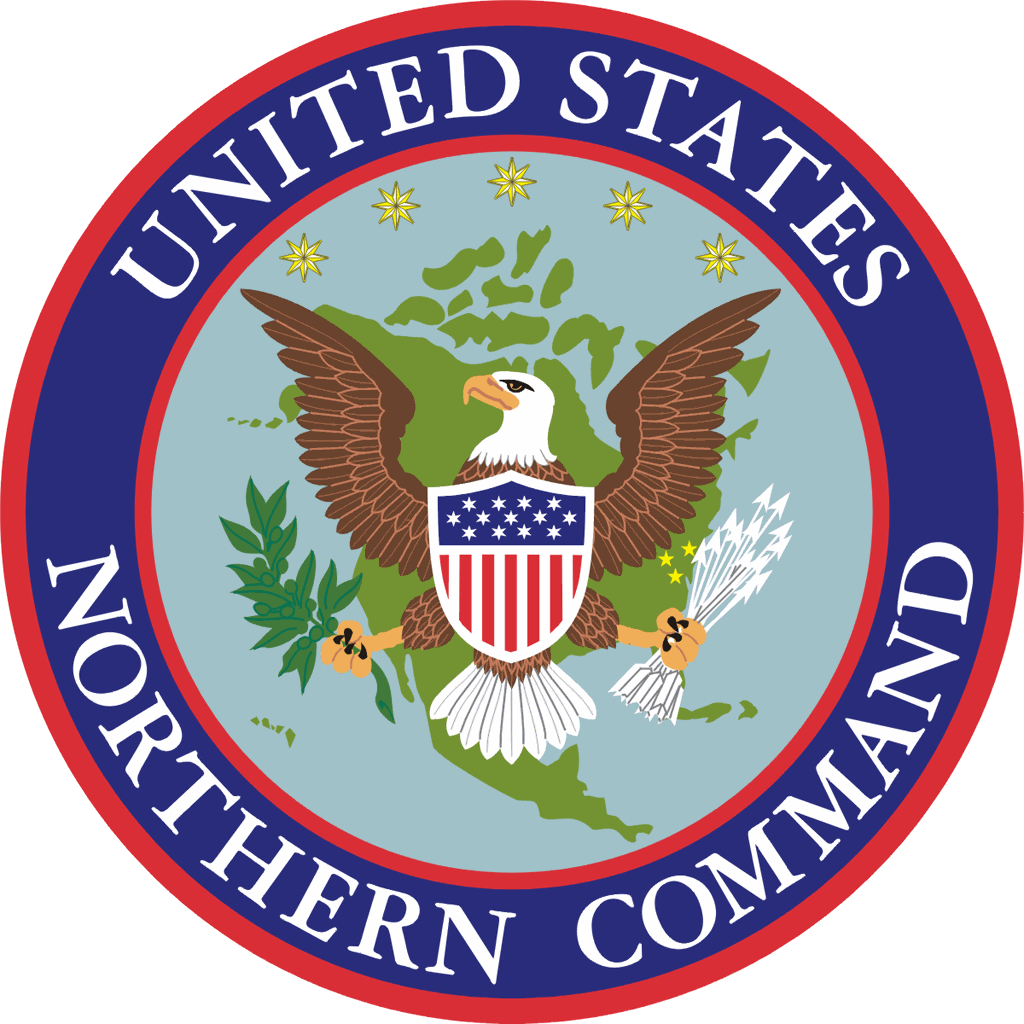
- United States Northern Command Badge
- North American Aerospace Defense Command Badge

Defense Distinguished Service Medal with bronze oak leaf cluster
Air Force Distinguished Service Medal with bronze oak leaf cluster
Legion of Merit with bronze oak leaf cluster
Distinguished Flying Cross
Defense Meritorious Service Medal
Meritorious Service Medal with two bronze oak leaf clusters
Air Medal with two silver and one bronze oak leaf cluster
Air Force Commendation Medal
Presidential Unit Citation
Joint Meritorious Unit Award with two bronze oak leaf clusters
Air Force Outstanding Unit Award with bronze oak leaf cluster
Organizational Excellence Award
Combat Readiness Medal
National Defense Service Medal with two bronze service stars
Armed Forces Expeditionary Medal with two bronze service stars
Vietnam Service Medal with three bronze service stars
Southwest Asia Service Medal with bronze service star
Humanitarian Service Medal with bronze service star
Air Force Overseas Short Tour Service Ribbon
Air Force Overseas Long Tour Service Ribbon with bronze oak leaf cluster
Air Force Longevity Service Award with silver and three bronze oak leaf clusters
Small Arms Expert Marksmanship Ribbon
Air Force Training Ribbon
Japanese Order of the Sacred Treasure, 1st class
French Legion of Honour, Officer
Vietnam Gallantry Cross Unit Award
Vietnam Campaign Medal
Kuwait Liberation Medal (Saudi Arabia)
Kuwait Liberation Medal (Kuwait)

== Other achievements ==
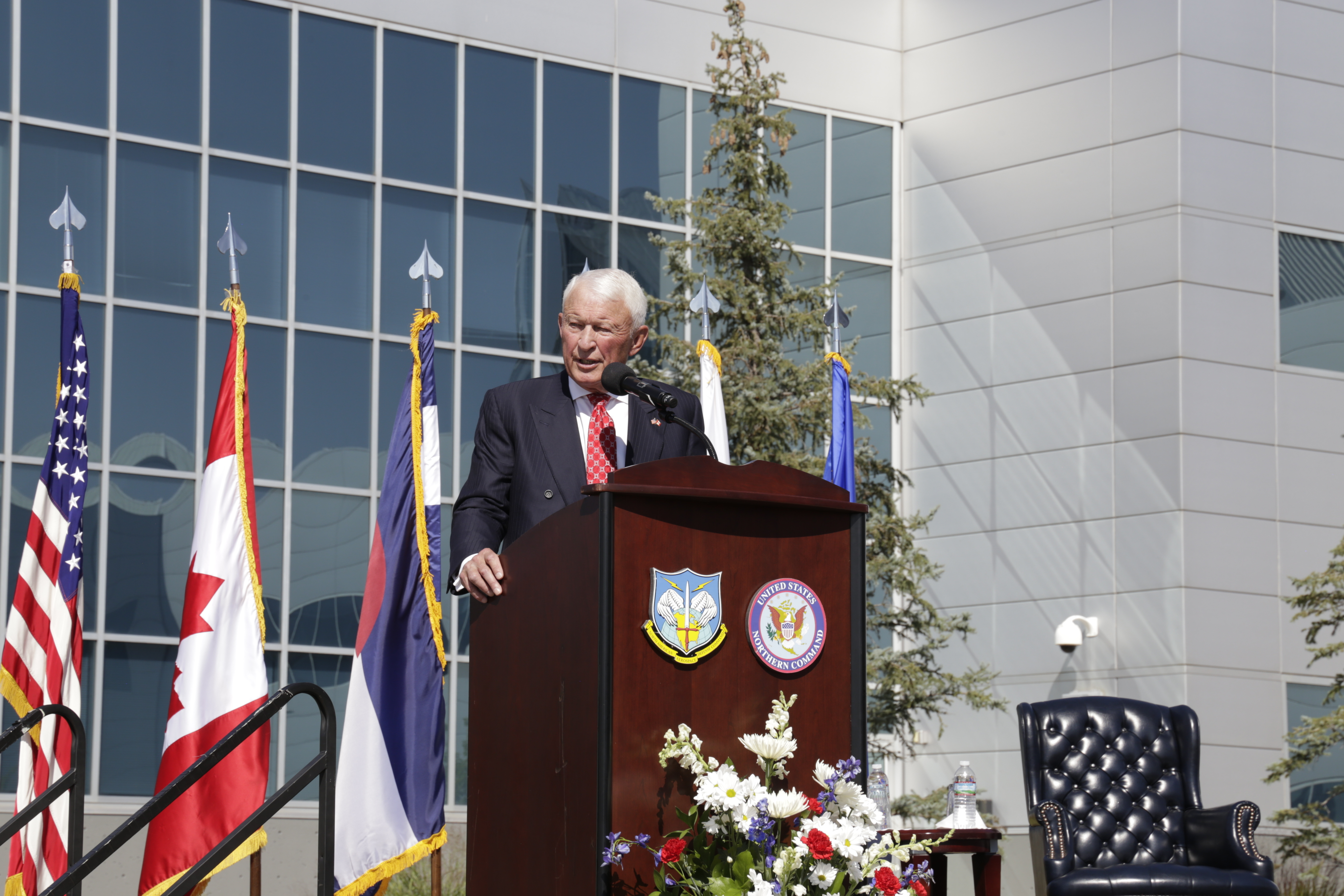
Eberhart provides remarks as keynote speaker at the 9/11 Commemoration Ceremony at the NORAD and USNORTHCOM headquarters on Peterson Space Force Base in Colorado Springs, Colorado, September 11, 2021.

- Able Aeronaut Award, Pacific Air Forces
- General Jimmy Doolittle Award, Air Force Association (AFA)
- Distinguished Achievement Award, AFA Tennessee Ernie Ford Chapter
- Member, Council of Foreign Relations
- Tom Lombardo Leadership Award, National Football Foundation and College Hall of Fame
- Thomas D. White Space Award, AFA
- Air Force Order of the Sword, Air Force Space Command
- General Bernard A. Schriever Award, AFA
- General James V. Hartinger Award, National Defense Industrial Association, Rocky Mountain Chapter

== Effective dates of promotion ==
Promotions
Insignia	Rank	Date
	General	August 1, 1997
	Lieutenant General	July 1, 1995
	Major general	July 1, 1993
	Brigadier general	March 1, 1991
	Colonel	November 1, 1984
	Lieutenant colonel	November 1, 1981
	Major	September 1, 1979
	Captain	June 5, 1971
	First lieutenant	December 5, 1969
	Second lieutenant	June 5, 1968

Military offices
Preceded by Thomas S. Moorman, Jr.	Vice Chief of Staff of the United States Air Force; 1997–1999	Succeeded by Lester Lyles
Preceded by Richard B. Myers	Commander of the North American Aerospace Defense Command; 2000–2004	Succeeded by Timothy J. Keating
New command	Commander of the United States Northern Command; 2002–2004	Succeeded by Timothy J. Keating
