= United States Northern Command =

Unified combatant command of the US Armed Forces

- Founded: 1 October 2002 (23 years, 11 months ago)
- Country: United States
- Type: Unified combatant command
- Role: Geographic combatant command
- Part of: United States Department of Defense
- Headquarters: Peterson Space Force Base, Colorado Springs, Colorado, U.S.
- Motto: "We have the watch"
- Decorations: Joint Meritorious Unit Award
- Website: northcom.mil

Commanders
- Commander: General Gregory M. Guillot, USAF
- Deputy Commander: Lieutenant General Joseph Jarrard USA
- Senior Enlisted Leader: CMSgt John G. Storms, USAF

Insignia
- NATO Map Symbol

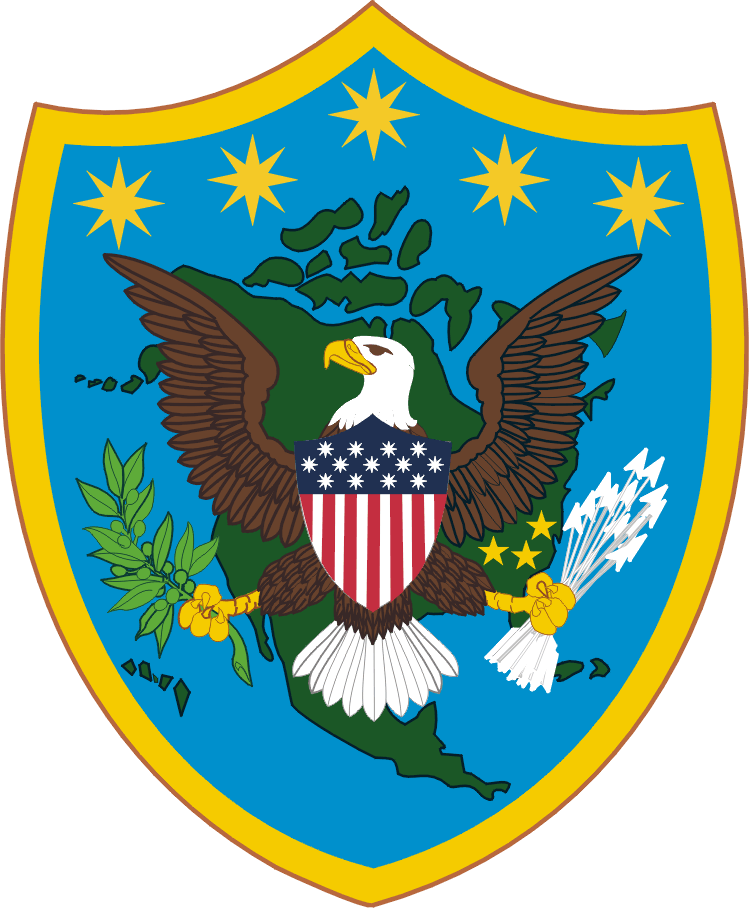
- US Northern Command Army Element SSI

The United States Northern Command (USNORTHCOM) is one of the 11 unified combatant commands of the United States Department of Defense. The command is tasked with providing military support for non-military authorities in the U.S., and protecting the territory and national interests of the United States within the continental United States, Puerto Rico, Canada, Mexico, the Bahamas, Greenland (Denmark) and the air, land and sea approaches to these areas. It is the U.S. military command which, if applicable, would be the primary defender against an invasion of the U.S.

USNORTHCOM was created on 25 April 2002 when President George W. Bush approved a new Unified Command Plan, following the September 11 attacks. USNORTHCOM went operational on 1 October 2002.

== Creation ==
USNORTHCOM was established on 25 April 2002 when President George W. Bush approved a new Unified Command Plan, and attained initial operating capability on 1 October 2002.

== Mission ==
According to the UCP, Northern Command's mission is to:

- Conduct operations to deter, prevent, and defeat threats and aggression aimed at the United States, its territories, and interests within the assigned area of responsibility and,
- As directed by the President or Secretary of Defense provide military assistance to non-military authorities including consequence management operations

== Area of responsibility ==
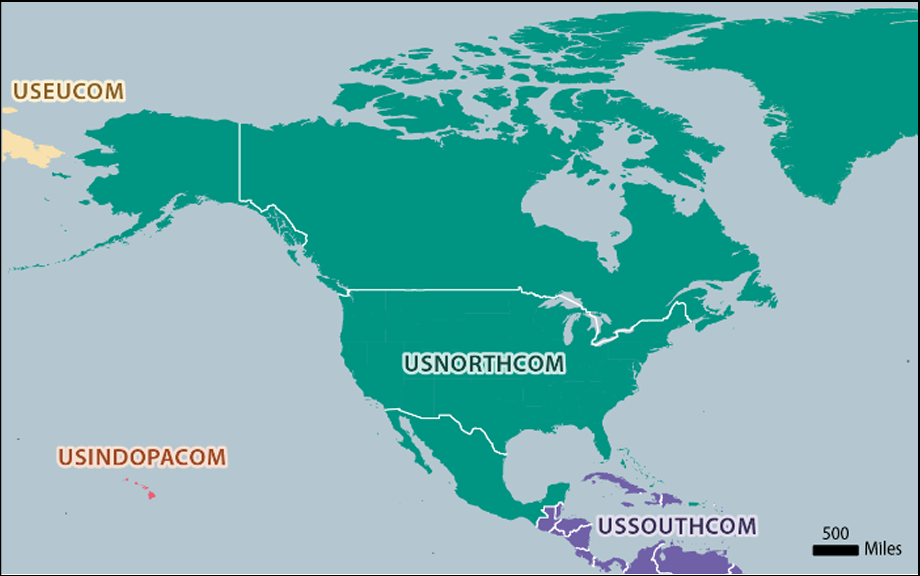
NORTHCOM Area of Responsibility (in green)

USNORTHCOM's Area of Responsibility (AOR) includes air, land and sea approaches and encompasses the continental United States, Canada, Mexico and the surrounding water out to approximately 500 nautical miles (930 km). It also includes the Gulf of Mexico, the Straits of Florida, portions of the Caribbean region to include The Bahamas, Puerto Rico, the U.S. Virgin Islands, the British Virgin Islands (United Kingdom), Bermuda (United Kingdom), and the Turks and Caicos Islands (United Kingdom). The commander of USNORTHCOM is responsible for theater security cooperation with Canada, Mexico, and The Bahamas. In May 2011, NORTHCOM was mobilized in the wake of the BP oil spill in the Gulf of Mexico to provide air, ground, and logistical support. In October 2014, NORTHCOM took administrative control of Alaskan Command. In June 2025, the area of responsibility of Greenland (Denmark) was shifted from USEUCOM to USNORTHCOM.

== Organizational structure ==
=== Headquarters ===
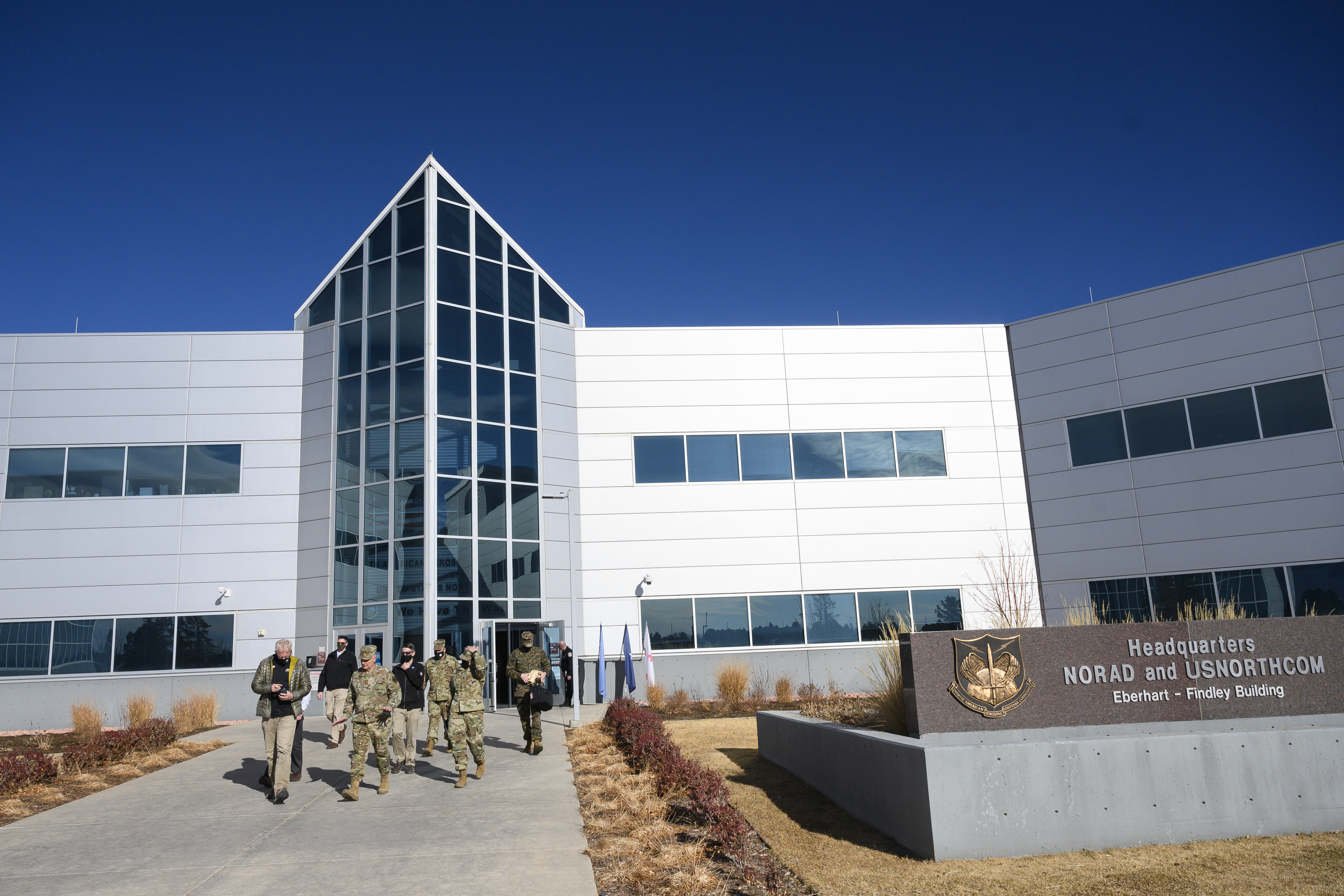
NORAD-USNORTHCOM headquarters at the Eberhart-Findley Building on Peterson Space Force Base

Commander, U.S. Northern Command is concurrently Commander of the U.S.-Canadian North American Aerospace Defense Command (NORAD). The two are co-located at Peterson Space Force Base in Colorado Springs, Colorado. General Ralph Eberhart was the first CDRUSNORTHCOM.

USNORTHCOM headquarters has approximately 1,200 uniformed and civilian staff. In its first period of organising in 2002–03, one priority was to hire civilian staff which could help respond to a Weapons of Mass Destruction attack and to coordinate disaster recovery.

=== Component commands ===
Emblem	Command	Acronym	Commander	Established	Headquarters	Subordinate Commands
	United States Army North; Joint Force Land Component Command	ARNORTH	Lt General Allan Pepin	11 June 1946	JBSA-Fort Sam Houston, Texas	Civil Support Training Activity; Task Force 46; Task Force 51; Task Force 76; 323rd Army Band; 505th Military Intelligence Brigade; 263rd Army Air and Missile Defense Command; 3rd Sustainment Command (Expeditionary); 377th Theater Sustainment Command
	Marine Corps Forces North	MARFORNORTH	Lt General Roberta L. Shea	16 December 1946	Naval Station Norfolk, Virginia	II Marine Expeditionary Force; Marine Corps Security Force Regiment; Chemical Biological Incident Response Force; Marine Corps Security Cooperation Group; Headquarters & Service Battalion
	United States Naval Forces Northern Command; Joint Force Maritime Component Command	NAVNORTH	Admiral Karl O. Thomas	1 January 1906	Naval Support Activity Hampton Roads, Virginia	United States 2nd Fleet; Naval Air Force Atlantic; Naval Surface Force Atlantic; Submarine Force Atlantic; Navy Expeditionary Combat Command; Navy Munitions Command Atlantic
	First Air Force / Air Forces Northern; Joint Force Air Component Command	1 AF (AFNORTH)	Lt Gen M. Luke Ahmann	1 November 2007	Tyndall Air Force Base, Florida	Eastern Air Defense Sector; Western Air Defense Sector; 601st Air Operations Center; Air Force Rescue Coordination Center; Air Forces Northern National Security Emergency Preparedness Directorate; Civil Air Patrol
	United States Space Forces Northern; Theater Joint Force Space Component Command	SPACEFOR-NORTH	Brig General Robert Schreiner	26 January 2026	Peterson Space Force Base, Colorado	

=== Subordinate unified commands ===
Emblem	Command	Acronym	Commander	Established	Headquarters	Subordinate Commands
	Alaskan Command	ALCOM	Lt General Robert D. Davis, USAF	15 November 1945	Joint Base Elmendorf-Richardson, Alaska	11th Airborne Division; Eleventh Air Force; There is no U.S. Navy component of ALCOM. The United States Coast Guard's 17th District works closely with ALCOM and de facto acts as its maritime component.
	Special Operations Command North	SOCNORTH	Colonel Matthew P. Tucker, USA	5 November 2013	Peterson Space Force Base, Colorado	

=== Joint task forces ===
Emblem	Command	Acronym	Commander	Established	Headquarters
	Joint Task Force – National Capital Region	JTF-NCR	Major General Antoinette Gant, USA	22 September 2004	Fort Lesley J. McNair, Washington D.C.
	Joint Task Force – Civil Support	JTF-CS	Brigadier General Tanya S. McGonegal, ARNG	October 1999	Joint Base Langley-Eustis, Virginia
	Joint Task Force - Southern Border	JTF-SB	Major General David W. Gardner, USA	March 2025	Fort Huachuca, Arizona
	Joint Task Force - Gold	JTF-Gold	Lt. Gen. John L. Rafferty Jr., USA	January 2026	Peterson Space Force Base, Colorado "Operational arm of NORTHCOM’s integrated air and missile defense enterprise."
	Joint Interagency Task Force-Counter Cartel	JIATF-CC	Brigadier General Maurizio Calabrese, USAF	January 2026	Fort Bliss, Texas

== Commanders ==
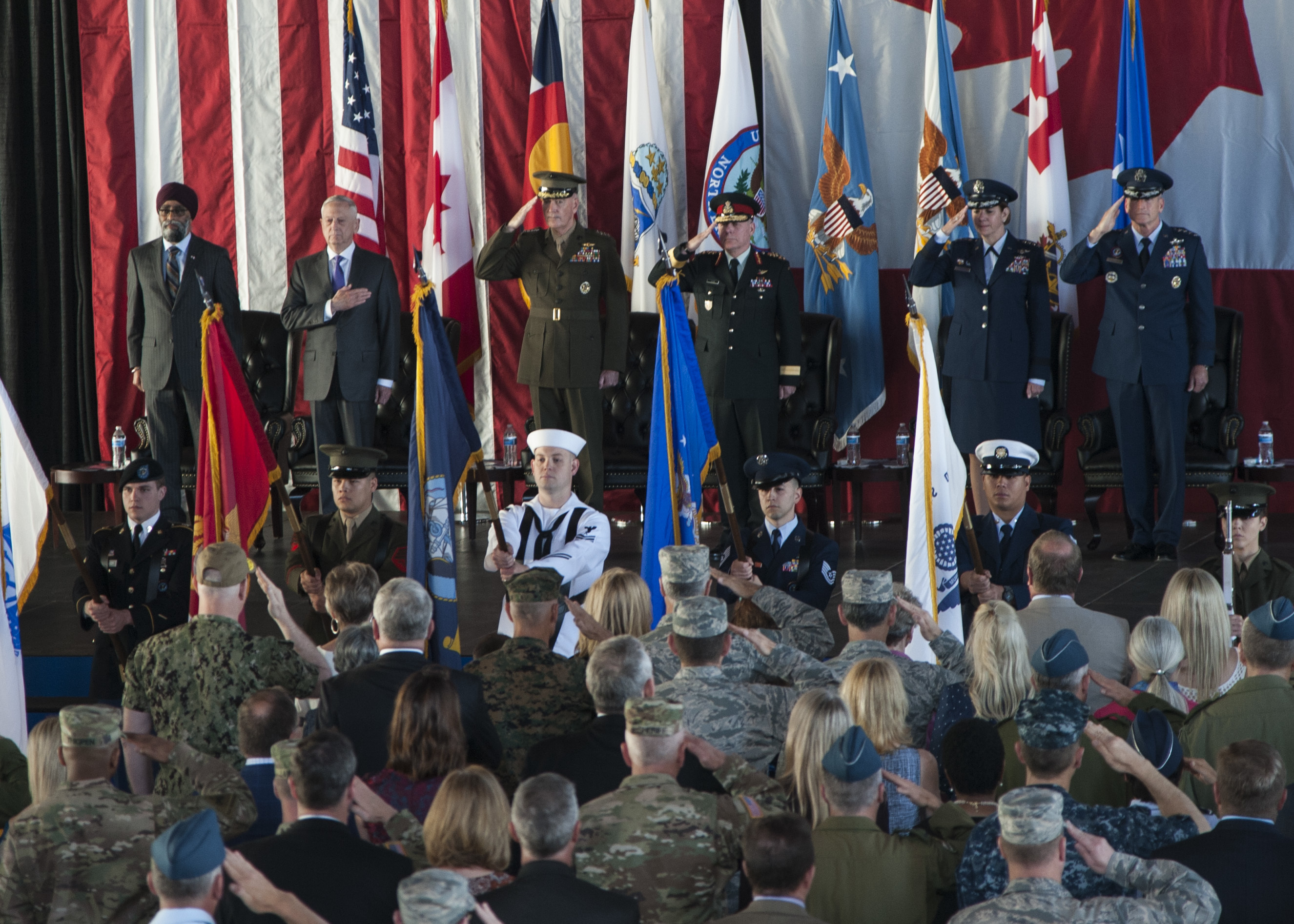
Attendees pay respects during the playing of the American national anthem at the NORAD-USNORTHCOM change of command ceremony on 23 May 2018.

The commander of United States Northern Command is a four-star general or admiral in the United States Armed Forces who serves as the head of all U.S. military forces within the command's geographical area of responsibility. The commander of U.S. Northern Command concurrently serves as the commander of North American Aerospace Defense Command (NORAD) and is the head of all United States and Canadian joint aerospace military operational forces, stationed within the Northern American territories. The commander of U.S. Northern Command is nominated for appointment by the President of the United States and must be confirmed by the United States Senate. The commander of U.S. Northern Command typically serves for two years.

Note: The National Defense Authorization Act of 2008 stipulates that at least one deputy commander of USNORTHCOM be a National Guard general officer unless the commander is already such an officer.

No.	Commander		Term			Service branch
No.	Portrait	Name	Took office	Left office	Term length	Service branch
1	Ralph E. Eberhart	General; Ralph E. Eberhart (born 1946)	22 October 2002	5 November 2004	2 years, 14 days	U.S. Air Force
2	Timothy J. Keating	Admiral; Timothy J. Keating (born 1948)	5 November 2004	23 March 2007	2 years, 138 days	U.S. Navy
3	Victor E. Renuart Jr.	General; Victor E. Renuart Jr. (born 1949)	23 March 2007	19 May 2010	3 years, 57 days	U.S. Air Force
4	James A. Winnefeld Jr.	Admiral; James A. Winnefeld Jr. (born 1956)	19 May 2010	3 August 2011	1 year, 76 days	U.S. Navy
5	Charles H. Jacoby Jr.	General; Charles H. Jacoby Jr. (born 1954)	3 August 2011	5 December 2014	3 years, 124 days	U.S. Army
6	William E. Gortney	Admiral; William E. Gortney (born 1955)	5 December 2014	13 May 2016	1 year, 160 days	U.S. Navy
7	Lori J. Robinson	General; Lori J. Robinson (born 1958/1959)	13 May 2016	24 May 2018	2 years, 11 days	U.S. Air Force
8	Terrence J. O'Shaughnessy	General; Terrence J. O'Shaughnessy (born 1964/1965)	24 May 2018	20 August 2020	2 years, 73 days	U.S. Air Force
9	Glen D. VanHerck	General; Glen D. VanHerck (born 1962)	20 August 2020	5 February 2024	3 years, 169 days	U.S. Air Force
10	Gregory M. Guillot	General; Gregory M. Guillot	5 February 2024	Incumbent	2 years, 232 days	U.S. Air Force

== Planning and strategy ==
Northern Command has created several classified "concept plans" (e.g. "Defense Support of Civil Authorities") that are intended to address the 15 National Planning Scenarios that NORTHCOM must be prepared to respond to.

However, in 2012, the GAO found that the national strategy to defend the United States is several years out of date.

On 20 January 2025, President Donald Trump issued an executive order instructing the Secretary of Defense to give Northern Command the mission to "seal the borders and maintain the sovereignty, territorial integrity, and security of the United States," requiring the secretary to revise the Unified Command Plan within 10 days in accordance with the order, and the commander of Northern Command to present a plan within 30 days on how NORTHCOM will achieve this mission.

== Domestic operations and training ==
NORTHCOM operates extensive domestic intelligence operations which both share and receive information from local, state and federal law enforcement agencies. Employees of the Federal Bureau of Investigation, Central Intelligence Agency, National Security Agency, Defense Intelligence Agency, National Geospatial-Intelligence Agency, and other agencies maintain offices at NORTHCOM and receive daily intelligence briefings. The total of 14 agencies with representatives at NORTHCOM in December 2002 included the State Department, NASA, and the Federal Aviation Administration.

Northern Command has completed several joint training exercises with local, state and federal law enforcement agencies, the Department of Homeland Security, and the Federal Emergency Management Agency (FEMA).

In Exercise Vigilant Shield 2008, Northern Command, Pacific Command, the Department of Homeland Security, and numerous law enforcement agencies across the U.S. conducted exercises to test their "response abilities against a variety of potential threats".

In January 2025 the Northern Command activated military police and combat engineer units from the Army and Marine Corps to support Customs and Border Protection on the U.S. southern border. In March 2025, the newly formed Joint Task Force-Southern Border, from the headquarters of the 10th Mountain Division, took over control of the operation along the Mexico–United States border, to oversee joint forces and serve as the NORTHCOM land component command for the mission, which involves about 10,000 service members.

== Related legislation ==
The Posse Comitatus Act of 1878 and subsequent Department of Defense policy constrains any member of the United States Army, Air Force, Navy, or Marine Corps, and the National Guard under federal authority from domestically intervening in a law enforcement capacity on United States soil. Several exceptions to the law have been used in the past, including protecting the citizens' constitutional rights in the absence of state and/or local assistance, such as protecting the Little Rock Nine students in Little Rock, Arkansas in 1957, and using the Insurrection Act to quell civil disorders, such as the 1992 Los Angeles riots.

The Military Commissions Act of 2006 lifted many restrictions placed on the military to support non-military authorities by the Posse Comitatus Act, however the United States Supreme Court ruled in June 2008 that significant portions of the MCA were unconstitutional. The "John Warner Defense Authorization Act of 2007" H.R. 5122 (2006) effectively nullified the limits of the Insurrection Act when it was passed; however, the bill was amended in 2008.

On 1 October 2008, the 3rd Infantry Division's 1st Brigade Combat Team was assigned to U.S. Northern Command, marking the first time an active unit had been given a dedicated assignment to Northern Command. The force will be known for the first year as a CBRNE Consequence Management Response Force, and will serve as an on-call federal response force for terrorist attacks and other natural or manmade emergencies and disasters.

== See also ==
- National Defense Authorization Act for Fiscal Year 2012
- NSPD-51
