= List of United States Air Force personnel =

This is a list of notable people who served in the United States Air Force, the Air National Guard, or their antecedents in the Army. See also Graduates of the United States Air Force Academy.

== A ==
- Oscar Zeta Acosta – Attorney, Chicano Movement activist, novelist and close friend of American author Hunter S. Thompson
- Charles J. Adams – brigadier general and aviator
- John Agar – Film actor
- Paul W. Airey – First Chief Master Sergeant of the Air Force
- Frank Albertson – Film actor
- Robert Aldrich – DGA Award-nominated filmmaker
- Buzz Aldrin – Astronaut (Gemini 12 and Apollo 11 – second man to walk on the Moon)
- Robert Altman – Seven-time Oscar-nominated filmmaker who flew more than 50 bombing missions as a co-pilot of a B-24 Liberator in the Asiatic-Pacific Theater of World War II
- Leon Ames – Film and TV actor who served in the field artillery of the U.S. Army and later in the flying corps (the Army Air Service) during World War I
- Wally Amos – Television personality, businessman, author and founder of the Famous Amos chocolate chip cookie, the Cookie Kahuna, and Aunt Della's Cookies gourmet cookie brands, and host of the adult reading program Learn to Read
- William Anders – Astronaut (Apollo 8 – first flight to orbit the Moon)
- Michael P. Anderson – NASA astronaut killed in the Columbia Space Shuttle disaster (STS-89, STS-107)
- Sunny Anderson – Radio and television personality
- William C. Anderson – Author and screenwriter who adapted his own Bat*21 starring Gene Hackman and Danny Glover
- Keith Andes – Film, TV and stage actor
- Edward Anhalt – Novelist and screenwriter
- Al Anthony – Radio personality
- Richard Arlen – Film actor
- Michael F. Armstrong – Attorney
- Hap Arnold – Aviation pioneer and General of the Air Force
- Jack Arnold – Oscar-nominated filmmaker
- Luke Askew – Film and TV actor
- Leon Askin – Film and TV actor
- Xavier Atencio – Film animator
- Gene Autry – Grammy Award-winning musician, singer, Oscar-nominated songwriter, film actor and Major League Baseball team owner

== B ==
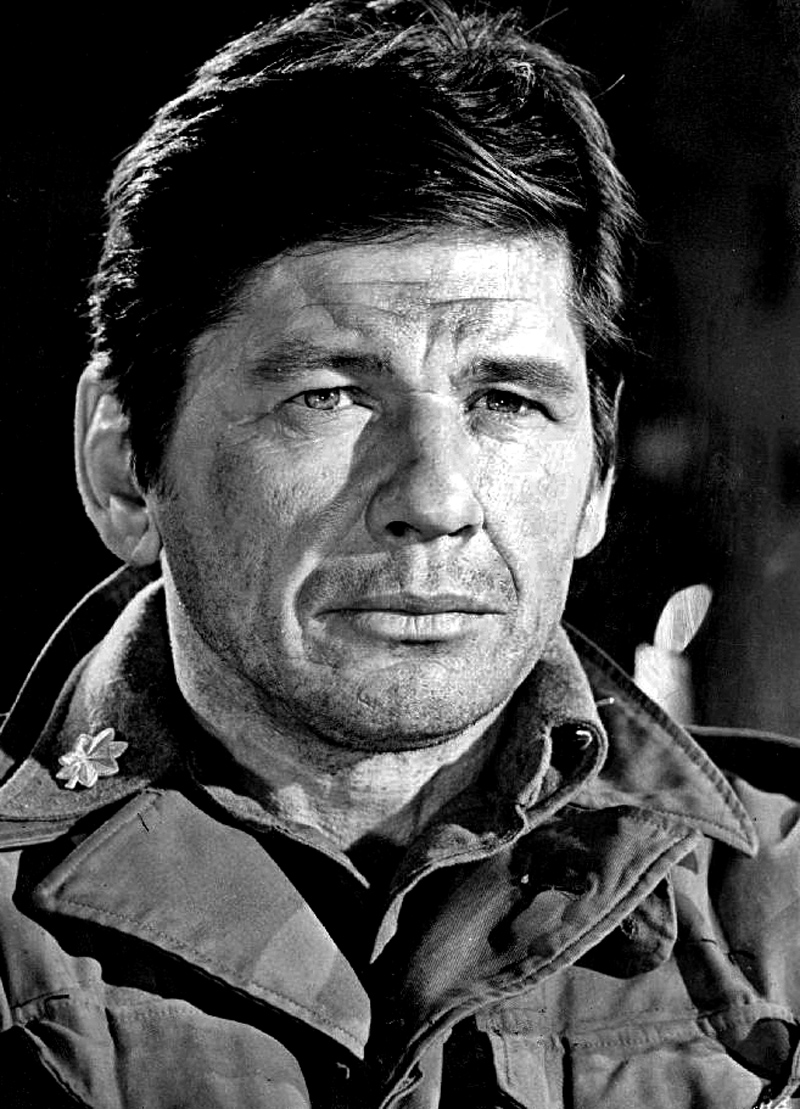
Charles Bronson

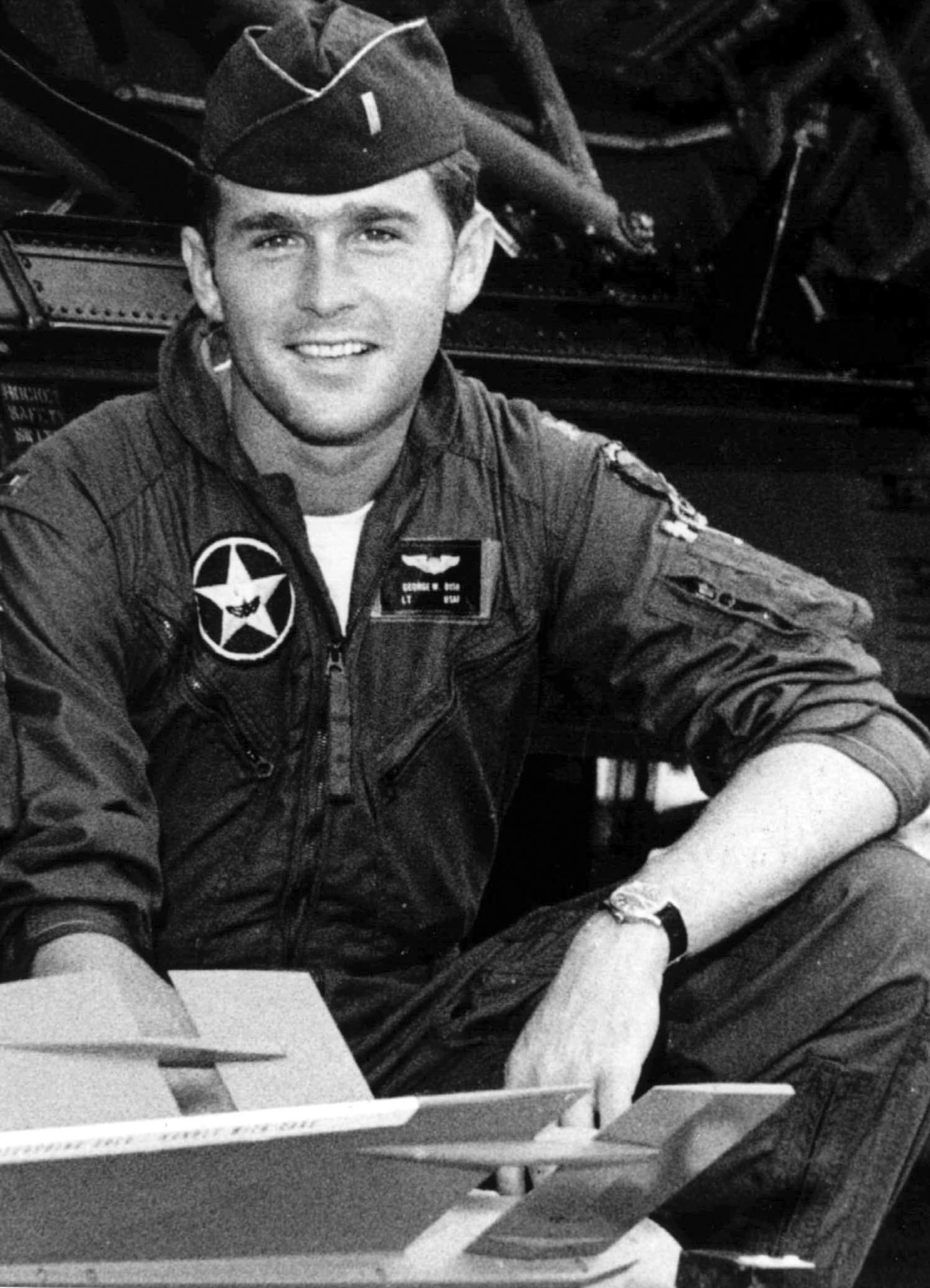
George W. Bush

- Alonzo Babers – Airline pilot and Olympic athlete
- Jacob “Buddy” Baer – Boxer, film and TV actor
- Max Baer, Jr. – Film actor
- Max Baer, Sr. – Boxer and World Heavyweight Champion, Film and TV actor
- Parley Baer – Film and television actor
- Hobey Baker – Amateur hockey player
- Bernt Balchen – Norwegian-born aviation explorer
- Thomas Scott Baldwin – Pioneer balloonist
- Martin Balsam – Oscar-winning film actor
- John Banner – Film and television actor
- Sy Bartlett – Screenwriter and producer, co-author of Twelve O'Clock High
- Warren Beatty – Oscar-winning film actor, filmmaker, producer and screenwriter
- Don Beddoe – Film and television actor
- Chuck Bednarik – Professional football player
- Art Bell – Talk radio personality
- Brooks Benedict – Actor of the silent and sound film eras who served with the American Ambulance Corps and in the U.S. Army Air Service during the First World War
- Lloyd Bentsen – Senator from Texas, 1988 vice presidential nominee, 69th Secretary of the Treasury
- Elmer Bernstein – Oscar and Emmy-winning and Grammy Award-nominated film composer
- Charles A. Berry – Flight surgeon during the Apollo space program and Director of Life Sciences at the NASA
- Mark H. Berry – American politician
- James Best – Film and television actor
- Edward Binns – Film and television actor
- John Birch – East China missionary
- Barry Bishop – Member of the first American team to summit Mount Everest
- Whit Bissell – Film and television actor
- Charles F. Blair, Jr. – General officer and husband of actress Maureen O'Hara
- Esther Blake – First female member of the United States Air Force
- Michael Blake – Oscar-winning screenwriter and author of Dances with Wolves and its 1988 best-selling novel
- William Peter Blatty – Oscar-winning screenwriter, film producer, director and author known for his 1971 novel The Exorcist and for writing and producing the hugely successful 1973 film adaptation
- Guion Bluford – Astronaut and first African American to fly in space (STS-8, STS-61-A, STS-39, STS-53)
- John Boccieri – Member of Congress of Ohio.
- Paul Bogart – Five-time Emmy Award-winning television director and producer
- Richard Bong – American Ace of Aces
- Frank Borman – Astronaut (Gemini 7 and Apollo 8 – first flight to orbit the Moon)
- Robert Sidney Bowen – Newspaper journalist, magazine editor and author of the Dave Dawson War Adventure Series and the Red Randall Series. Served as a fighter pilot in both the Royal Air Force (RAF) and the United States Army Air Service, and as an ambulance driver with the American Field Service (AFS) during World War I.
- William Bowers – Screenwriter
- Boxcar Willie – Country music entertainer
- John Boyd – Air Force fighter pilot and Pentagon consultant during the second half of the 20th century who, together with Thomas Christie, created the Energy–Maneuverability theory of aerial combat, which became the world standard for the design of fighter aircraft
- Vance D. Brand – Astronaut who also was a naval aviator in the U.S. Marine Corps (Apollo–Soyuz Test Project, STS-5, STS-41-B, STS-35)
- Albert Brenner – Five-time Oscar-nominated production designer and art director
- Lewis H. Brereton – Aviation pioneer and only active duty member of USAF and all of its forebears
- John Briley – Oscar-winning screenwriter
- Charles Bronson – Emmy Award-nominated film and television actor
- Rand Brooks – Film and television actor (Babes in Arms, Gone with the Wind)
- Al Brown – Film and television actor known for The Wire who served 29 years in the Air Force including two tours in Vietnam
- Charles Q. Brown Jr. – USAF general who is currently serving as the 21st chairman of the Joint Chiefs of Staff as of January 2024
- Clarence Brown – Six-time Oscar-nominated filmmaker who was a fighter pilot and flight instructor with the U.S. Army Air Service during World War I
- Dale Brown – Author
- Roscoe C. Brown, Jr. – Tuskegee Airman, educator, and TV personality
- Roger Browne – Film actor best known for his work in the peplum and Eurospy films popular in Europe in the 1960s and 1970s
- Robert Brubaker – Film and TV actor
- Don Budge – American tennis player most famous as the first tennis player to win the Grand Slam
- John Bunch – Jazz pianist
- William Bundy – CIA analyst and foreign affairs advisor
- George W. Bush – 43rd President of the United States
- Aaron Bushnell – 25-year-old airman who live streamed his self-immolation and resultant death outside the front gate of the Embassy of Israel in Washington, D.C. in protest of genocide and United States support for Israel in the Gaza war
- Craig D. Button – Victim of mysterious flight and crash
- Red Buttons – Oscar-winning film actor

== C ==
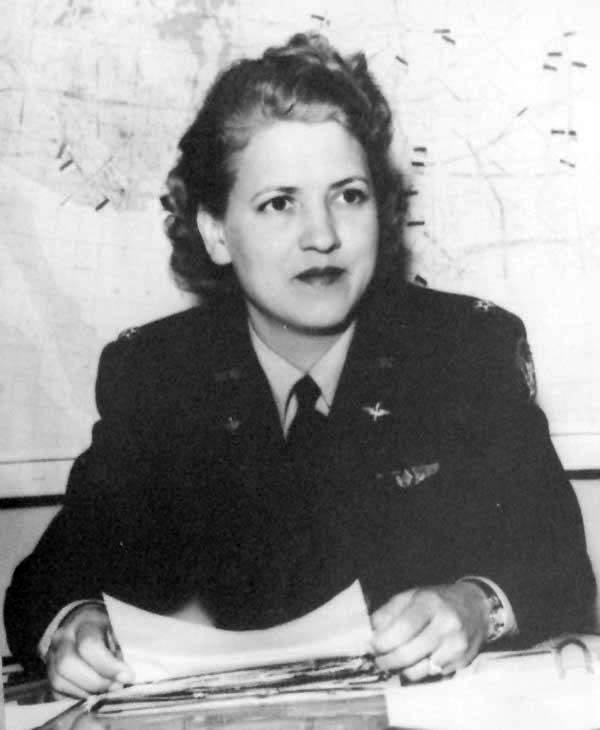
Jacqueline Cochran

- Bruce Cabot – Film actor
- Frank Cady – Film and TV actor
- Ben Nighthorse Campbell – Cheyenne politician who represented Colorado's 3rd congressional district in the House of Representatives from 1987 to 1993 and was a U.S. Senator from Colorado from 1993 to 2005
- Dann Cahn – Film editor
- Daniel Caine – Air Force major and F-16 fighter pilot whose mission (along with three other pilots, including USAF Major Heather Penney, Captain Brandon Rasmussen and Lieutenant General Marc Sasseville) on 9/11 was to find United Flight 93 and destroy it however they could, including ramming the aircraft.
- George Carlin – Emmy Award-nominated and Grammy-winning stand-up comedian and actor
- Don Carpenter – Novelist and WGA Award-nominated screenwriter
- John Carroll – Film actor
- Jack Carter – Daytime Emmy Award-nominated comedian, actor and television presenter
- Johnny Cash – Grammy Award-winning country music singer and musician
- Don Castle – Film actor
- Clint Castleberry – College football player
- James Lea Cate – Historian
- Clarence Chamberlin – Barnstormer and aviation pioneer
- Harry Chapin – Singer/songwriter
- Hollis B. Chenery – Economist
- John Ciardi – Poet
- Theresa Claiborne – First female African-American pilot in the U.S. Air Force
- Beryl Clark – Professional football player
- Hal Clement – Author
- Larry Clinton – Band leader
- William Close – Surgeon and physician, father of Oscar-nominated actress Glenn Close
- Lee J. Cobb – Oscar-nominated film actor
- Bill Cobbs – Emmy Award-winning film and TV actor
- Jacqueline Cochran – Aviator; co-founder and director of the Women Airforce Service Pilots
- Red Cochran – Professional football player, coach, and scout
- Fred Coe – Oscar-nominated film and TV director, film and TV producer and screenwriter
- Gene Colan – comic book artist best known for his work for Marvel Comics
- Charles J. Colgan – Virginia politician and founder of Colgan Air.
- Eileen Collins – Astronaut (STS-84, STS-93, STS-114)
- Michael Collins – Astronaut (Gemini 10 & Apollo 11)
- Ramón Colón-López – First Hispanic recipient of the Air Force Combat Action Medal
- Darva Conger – former emergency department nurse and winner on Who Wants to Marry a Multi-Millionaire? in 2000
- John Connell – Film, TV, stage and voice actor
- Mike Connors – Emmy-nominated and Golden Globe Award-winning film and TV actor best known for playing private detective Joe Mannix
- William Conrad – Emmy and Golden Globe Award-nominated film and TV actor, director and producer
- Jackie Coogan – Film and television actor
- Gordon Cooper – Mercury astronaut (Mercury 9 & Gemini 5)
- Merian C. Cooper – Oscar-nominated filmmaker, adventurer and producer who was a fighter pilot in World War I. Cooper also was an aviator in the Polish Air Force.
- Joseph Cotten – Film actor
- Joe Coulombe – American entrepreneur who founded the grocery store chain Trader Joe's
- James E. Counsilman – Collegiate swimming coach
- John R. Countryman – American child actor known by the stage name "Johnny Russell" who was an Air Force pilot and later as a career officer for the United States Foreign Service (Mr. Smith Goes to Washington)
- Alexander Courage – Oscar-nominated and Emmy Award-winning film composer
- Clyde Cowan – Physicist and discoverer of the neutrino
- James Gould Cozzens – Pulitzer Prize-winning novelist
- Brad Crandall – Radio personality, voice-over announcer and film narrator, best known for his radio show on WNBC in New York City which aired from March 1964 to September 1971. Crandall also served in the U.S. Marine Corps.
- Broderick Crawford – Oscar-winning film and television actor
- Mort Crim – Television news anchor
- Adrian Cronauer – Lawyer, media expert and inspiration for the film Good Morning, Vietnam
- Floyd Crosby – Oscar and Golden Globe Award-winning cinematographer
- Robert Cummings – Emmy Award-winning film and television actor

== D ==
- James Daly – Emmy Award-winning actor (Planet of the Apes)
- Tom D'Andrea – Film and television actor
- Tom Daschle – Senator from South Dakota
- Benjamin O. Davis, Jr. – First African-American USAF general officer
- Bud Day – Medal of Honor recipient and prisoner of war in Vietnam
- Jimmy Dean – Grammy Award-winning country music singer, television host, actor, businessman and creator of the Jimmy Dean sausage brand
- Brad Dexter – Film actor and producer
- James Dickey – Poet, author of the 1970 novel Deliverance and Golden Globe-nominated screenwriter of the 1972 film adaptation
- William Diehl – Author of the novel Primal Fear which was adapted into the 1996 film of the same name
- Joe DiMaggio – New York Yankees center fielder
- Lawrence Dobkin – Emmy Award-nominated actor (North by Northwest)
- Brian Donlevy – Oscar-nominated film actor
- Jimmy Doolittle – Test pilot and aeronautical engineer
- Bob Dornan – Member of Congress from California and talk radio personality
- Robert Drew – Documentary filmmaker known as the father of cinéma vérité or direct cinema in the United States (Primary, Crisis)
- Gary Drinkwater – Maine state representative
- Howard Duff – Film and television actor (Kramer vs. Kramer, The Late Show)
- Charles Duke – Astronaut (Apollo 16)
- Ed Dwight – Sculptor, author, former test pilot, astronaut and first African American to have entered the Air Force training program from which NASA selected astronauts. He was controversially not selected to officially join NASA. He finally achieved spaceflight on May 19, 2024, surpassing William Shatner as the oldest person to fly in space.

== E ==
- Ivan Edwards – flight surgeon, minister, and humanitarian
- Sherman Edwards – composer, jazz pianist and songwriter best known for his songs from the 1969 Broadway musical 1776 and the 1972 film adaptation
- Donn F. Eisele – Astronaut (Apollo 7)
- Robert Ellenstein – Film and television actor
- Sam Elliott – Oscar-nominated film actor
- Cliff Emmich – Film and television actor (Payday)
- Jules Engel – Oscar-nominated film producer, filmmaker and animator
- Joe Engle – Astronaut, X-15 and space shuttle pilot
- Bill Erwin – Character actor known for his 1993 Emmy Award-nominated performance on Seinfeld, portraying the embittered, irascible retiree Sid Fields in the episode "The Old Man"

== F ==
- Fred D. Fagg Jr. – 2nd Director of Air Commerce and 6th president of the University of Southern California
- Al Feldstein – Writer, editor and artist best known for his work at EC Comics and as editor of the satirical magazine Mad
- Norman Fell – Film and television actor
- Michael Fincke – Astronaut (STS-134)
- Morton S. Fine – Emmy and Edgar Award-nominated and WGA Award-winning screenwriter known for his writing partnership with David Friedkin (The Pawnbroker, I Spy)
- Bryce Fisher – Professional football player
- Joe Flaherty – Emmy Award-winning actor, writer and comedian known for his role as Donald the heckler in Happy Gilmore (1996)
- Pat Flaherty – Film actor and professional baseball and football player who also served in the U.S. Army during the Pancho Villa Expedition, as a fighter pilot in the U.S. Army Air Service during the First World War and as an officer in the U.S. Marine Corps during World War II and the Korean War
- Kelly Flinn – First female B-52 pilot
- Med Flory – Jazz saxophonist, bandleader and actor
- Tennessee Ernie Ford – Television comedian and recording artist
- Nathan Bedford Forrest III – Great-grandson of Confederate general Nathan Bedford Forrest
- John Forsythe – Emmy-nominated and Golden Globe Award-winning film and television actor
- Roger Fortson – Black Air Force serviceman who was fatally shot in his home in Fort Walton Beach, Florida by Deputy Eddie Duran of the Okaloosa County Sheriff's Office in May 2024. The Okaloosa County Sheriff's Office concluded that Duran's "use of deadly force was not objectively reasonable".
- Joe Foss – U.S. Marine Corps flying ace and 20th Governor of South Dakota
- William Price Fox – Novelist and screenwriter
- John Frankenheimer – Emmy Award-winning and Golden Globe-nominated filmmaker
- Arthur Franz – Film actor
- Al Freeman Jr. – Emmy Award-nominated film and TV actor
- Morgan Freeman – Oscar-winning film actor
- Theodore Freeman – Astronaut (first fatality)
- Jacque Fresco – American futurist, social engineer, founder of The Venus Project, and advocate of global implementation of a socioeconomic system known as a "resource-based economy"
- Bruce Jay Friedman – Oscar-nominated screenwriter, novelist, playwright and actor

== G ==
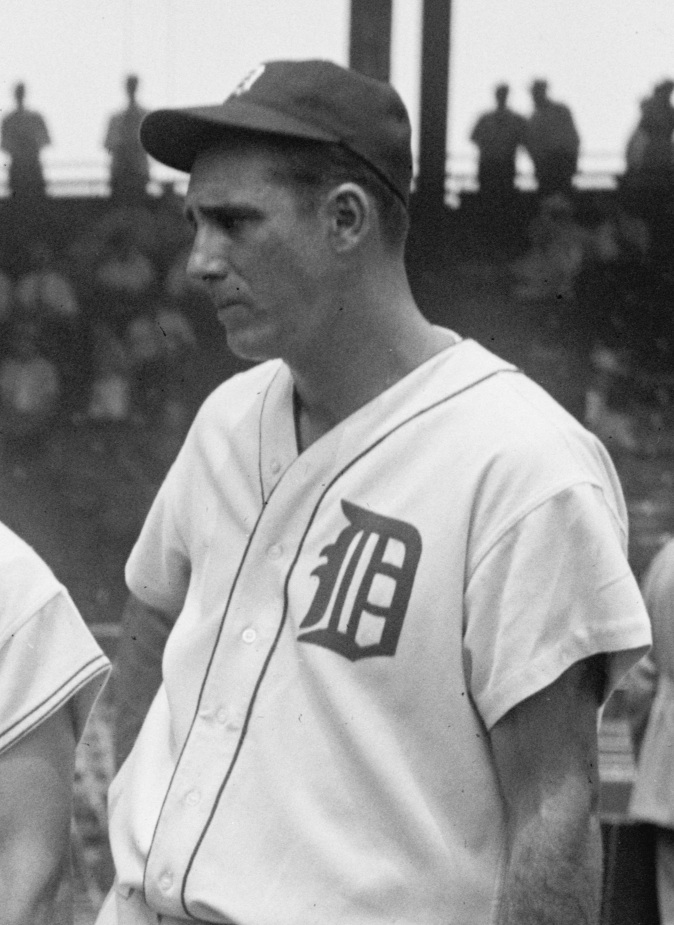
Hank Greenberg, Hall of Famer and 2-time MVP

- Clark Gable – Oscar-winning film actor
- William Gaines – Publisher and co-editor of EC Comics
- Ernest K. Gann – Novelist
- Daniel Garber – Artist
- William T. Gardiner – 55th Governor of Maine
- Arthur Gardner – Film actor and producer
- Robert Gates – 22nd United States Secretary of Defense
- Marvin Gaye – Grammy Award-winning singer and songwriter
- Michael V. Gazzo – Broadway playwright and Oscar-nominated film actor best known for playing Frank Pentangeli in The Godfather: Part II (1974)
- Elmer Gedeon – Three-sport college athlete and professional baseball player
- Leigh Gerdine – Musician, civic leader, Webster University president
- Henry Gibson – Golden Globe Award-nominated film actor and Grammy Award-nominated singer and songwriter
- Nelson Gidding – Oscar-nominated screenwriter
- Lewis Gilbert – Oscar-nominated and BAFTA Award-winning filmmaker
- Guy Gilpatric – Pilot, flight instructor, journalist, short-story writer and novelist, best known for his Mr. Glencannon stories
- Sidney Glazier – Oscar-winning film producer
- John Glenn – Aviator, engineer, astronaut, businessman and politician who became the first American to orbit the Earth. Glenn initially enlisted in the Army Air Corps during World War II, then later was a naval aviator in the Marine Corps.
- George Gobel – Television comedian
- Arthur Godfrey – Television personality
- Barry Goldwater – Senator from Arizona and 1964 Republican presidential nominee
- Alberto Gonzales – 80th United States Attorney General
- Bert I. Gordon – Visual effects artist and filmmaker
- Dick Grace – Film stunt flyer
- Lindsey Graham – Senator from South Carolina
- Susan Grant – Novelist
- Peter Graves – Emmy and Golden Globe Award-winning film and television actor
- Hank Greenberg – Major League Baseball player
- Frederick D. Gregory – Astronaut (STS-51-B, STS-33, STS-44)
- John Howard Griffin – Journalist and author best known for his 1959 project to temporarily pass as a black man and journey through the Deep South in order to see life and segregation from the other side of the color line first-hand published under the title Black Like Me (1961)
- Gus Grissom – Mercury, Gemini, and Apollo Astronaut

== H ==
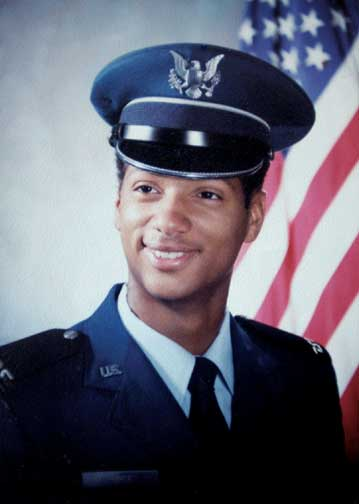
LeRoy Homer Jr.

- Larry Hagman – Emmy and Golden Globe Award-nominated film and television actor, director and producer
- William Wister Haines – Novelist, screenwriter and playwright
- Fred Haise – Naval aviator, Air Force pilot, test pilot and NASA astronaut (Apollo 13 and Space Shuttle Enterprise). Of the 24 men to have ever flown to the moon, Haise is also the only Marine.
- Arch Hall Sr. – Screenwriter, actor and filmmaker
- James Norman Hall – American writer best known for The Bounty Trilogy who holds the distinction of serving in the militaries of three Western allies during World War I; Great Britain as an infantryman, and then France and the United States as an aviator
- Iceal Hambleton – Missile expert, subject of "Bat 21" rescue
- Arthur B. Hancock, Jr. – Thoroughbred racehorse breeder
- Jack Hanlon – Child actor known for his role in Our Gang and silent films
- Brian Harnois – former paranormal investigator for Ghost Hunters and Ghost Hunters International
- Pat Harrington Jr. – Emmy Award-winning stage and television actor
- Harry Harrison – Science fiction author known mostly for his novel Make Room! Make Room! (1966)
- Paul Harvey – Peabody Award-winning radio broadcaster for ABC News Radio
- Bob Hastings – Film and TV actor
- Howard Hawks – Oscar-nominated filmmaker who was an aviator and flight instructor with the Aviation Section, U.S. Signal Corps and with the United States Army Air Service during World War I
- Michael Hayden – 19th CIA Director
- John Morse Haydon – Governor of American Samoa from 1969 to 1974
- Peter Lind Hayes – Vaudeville entertainer and film and television actor
- Van Heflin – Oscar-winning film actor
- H. John Heinz III – Senator from Pennsylvania
- Joseph Heller – Novelist
- Susan Helms – Astronaut (STS-54, STS-64, STS-78, STS-101, Expedition 2 - STS-102 / STS-105)
- Sherman Hemsley – Emmy and Golden Globe Award-nominated actor and musician
- Skitch Henderson – Band leader
- Barrington DeVaughn Hendricks - Rapper, singer and record producer
- Chad Hennings – Professional football player
- Jim Hensley – Beer executive and father-in-law to John McCain
- Don Herbert – Television personality better known as "Mr. Wizard"
- Charlton Heston – Oscar-winning film actor
- Nat Hiken – Five-time Emmy Award-winning television writer, director, producer and songwriter
- John Hillerman – Film actor
- Don Ho – Hawaiian traditional pop musician, singer and entertainer
- Ben Hogan – Professional golfer
- Dick Hogan – Film actor
- William Holden – Oscar-winning film actor
- Tim Holt – Film actor
- LeRoy Homer Jr. – Airline pilot, co-pilot of United Airlines Flight 93
- John Hope – Television meteorologist
- A.E. Hotchner – editor, novelist, playwright and biographer who co-founded the charity food company Newman's Own with Oscar-winning actor Paul Newman
- Rance Howard – Film and television actor, also father of actor and filmmaker Ron Howard and actor Clint Howard, and grandfather of actresses Bryce Dallas Howard and Paige Howard
- David Huddleston – Emmy Award-nominated film and television actor
- John Hudson – Film and TV actor
- Rune Hultman – Film actor
- E. Howard Hunt – Intelligence officer and author known for his involvement in the Watergate scandal, also served in the U.S. Navy and the Office of Strategic Services
- Rick Husband – NASA astronaut killed in the Columbia Space Shuttle disaster (STS-96, STS-107)
- Bobby Hutchins – Child actor known for his role in Our Gang shorts
- Mac Hyman – Novelist

== I ==
- James Irwin – Astronaut (Apollo 15 - eighth person to walk on the Moon)
- Burl Ives – Oscar-winning film actor and Grammy Award-winning musician

== J ==
- James Jabara – First American jet ace
- Bernard James – NBA player for the Dallas Mavericks
- Randall Jarrell – Poet
- Rick Jason – Film and television actor
- Russell Johnson – Film and television actor
- Sam Johnson – Member of Congress of Texas
- Bobby Jones – Amateur golf champion
- David M. Jones – Doolittle Raider and POW of Stalag Luft III.
- Jimmy J. Jumper – Air Force Major General and father of General John P. Jumper
- John P. Jumper – 17th Air Force Chief of Staff and retired four star General

== K ==
- James Karen – Saturn Award-winning film, television and theater actor
- Phil Karlson – Emmy-nominated film and television director
- Todd Karns – Film actor who played George Bailey's younger brother, Harry, in the 1946 film It's a Wonderful Life
- Nicholas Katzenbach – 65th United States Attorney General
- William Keighley – Film director and actor who supervised the First Motion Picture Unit of the United States Army Air Forces during World War II
- DeForest Kelley – Film and television actor
- Jack Kelly – Film, TV and stage actor
- Orry-Kelly – Three-time Oscar-winning Hollywood costume designer
- Arthur Kennedy – Five-time Oscar-nominated film actor
- Ron Kenoly – Christian music worship leader
- Irvin Kershner – Film director
- Algene and Frederick Key – Brothers and aviation pioneers
- Shawna Kimbrell – Lieutenant Colonel and first female African-American fighter pilot in the U.S. Air Force
- Iven Kincheloe – Air Force test pilot
- Micki King – Olympic diving gold-medalist and athletic coach
- Wally Kinnan – Pioneering meteorologist
- Julian Koenig – American copywriter who was inducted into The One Club Creative Hall of Fame in 1966
- Lester Koenig – Screenwriter, film producer, and founder of the jazz record label Contemporary Records
- Gene Kranz – aerospace engineer who was NASA's second Chief Flight Director, directing missions of the Mercury, Gemini and Apollo programs, including the first lunar landing mission, Apollo 11
- Norman Krasna – Oscar-winning screenwriter

== L ==
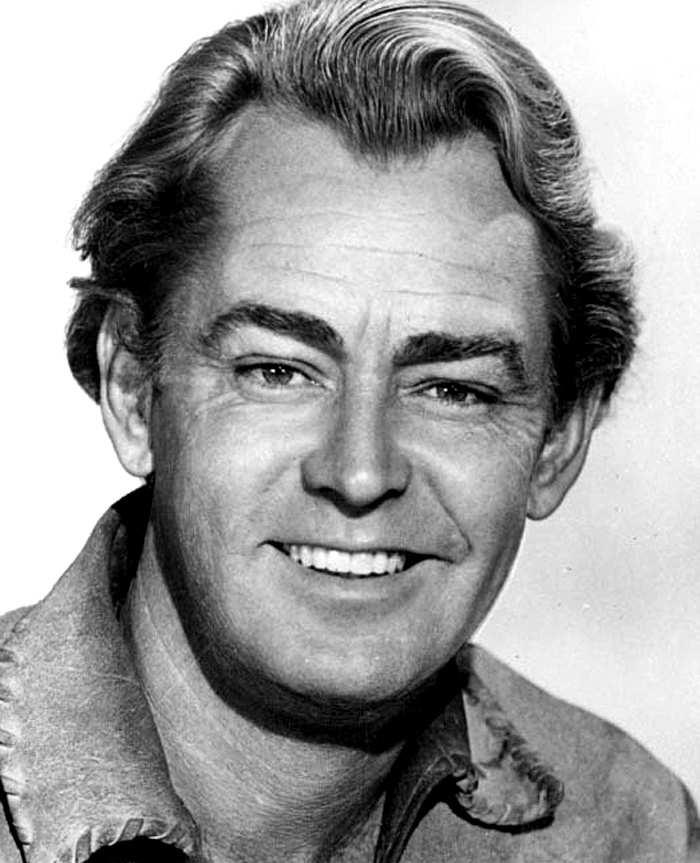
Alan Ladd

- Alan Ladd – Film actor
- David Ladd – Film and TV producer and former actor
- Fiorello H. La Guardia – Mayor of New York City
- Tim LaHaye – Baptist evangelical Christian minister who wrote more than 85 books, both fiction and non-fiction, including the Left Behind apocalyptic fiction series
- Frank Purdy Lahm – First military aviator
- Jay Lambert – Olympic and professional boxer and general surgeon
- Paul Lambert – Film and television actor
- Tom Landry – Dallas Cowboys football coach
- Mario Lanza – Grammy Award-nominated tenor and actor
- Arnold Laven – Film and television director and producer
- Beirne Lay, Jr. – Screenwriter, co-author of Twelve O'Clock High
- Norman Lear – Emmy Award-winning TV and film producer, director and Oscar-nominated screenwriter
- Jeannie Leavitt – First female USAF fighter pilot in 1993 and first woman to command a combat fighter wing
- Robert LeFevre – American libertarian businessman, radio personality and primary theorist of autarchism
- Curtis LeMay – USAF Chief of Staff and 1968 vice presidential candidate
- C.W. Lemoine – author, fighter pilot and YouTuber who also was an aviator in the U.S. Navy
- John Levitow – Enlisted recipient of the Medal of Honor
- Jules V. Levy – Film and television producer and screenwriter
- Buddy Lewis – Major League Baseball player
- Larry Lieber – Comic book artist and writer best known as co-creator of Iron Man, Thor and Ant-Man
- Charles Lindbergh – Legendary aviator
- George Lindsey – Film and TV actor and stand-up comedian
- James Lipton – Emmy Award-winning writer, lyricist, actor and dean emeritus of the Actors Studio Drama School at Pace University in New York City. He was also the executive producer, writer and host of the Bravo TV series Inside the Actors Studio.
- Roger Locher – USAF pilot whose rescue was the deepest inside North Vietnam of the entire Vietnam War
- Jon Locke – Film and TV actor
- Frank Loesser – Oscar, Grammy, Tony and Pulitzer Prize-winning songwriter
- Donald S. Lopez, Sr. – Ace with the Flying Tigers
- Pare Lorentz – Filmmaker known for his film work about the New Deal
- Robert Moffat Losey – Meteorologist; considered to be the first American military casualty of World War II
- Charlie Louvin – Grammy Award-nominated country music singer and songwriter best known as one of the Louvin Brothers
- Nancy Harkness Love – Aviator and co-founder of the Women Airforce Service Pilots
- Frank Luke Jr. – Medal of Honor recipient during World War I
- Anna Paulina Luna – Maxim magazine model and politician
- Jeffrey Lynn – Actor and film producer

== M ==
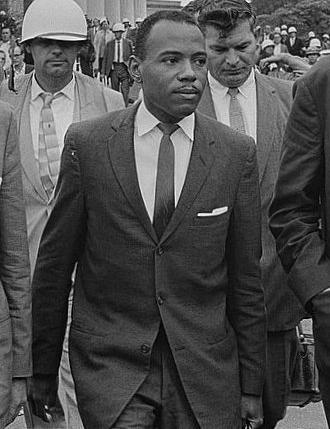
James Meredith in 1962

- John E. Mack – Psychiatrist
- Gavin MacLeod – Film and television actor
- Gordon MacRae – Broadway and Film actor
- John Lee Mahin – Screenwriter and film producer
- Nicole Malachowski – First woman pilot with United States Air Force Thunderbirds
- Karl Malden – Oscar-winning film actor
- Henry Mancini – Four-time Oscar-winning and 20-time Grammy Award-winning film composer and musician
- Herman J. Mankiewicz – Oscar-winning screenwriter of Citizen Kane who also served in the U.S. Marine Corps
- Delbert Mann – Oscar-winning film and TV director
- Paul Mantz – Film stunt pilot
- Steven Marlo – Film and television actor
- Barney Martin – Film and television actor and retired NYPD detective
- Dean Paul Martin – Singer and actor
- Tony Martin – Entertainer
- Vernon Martin – Professional football player
- Candy Massaroni – Republican member of the Kentucky House of Representatives from Kentucky's 50th House district
- Jerry Mathers – Television actor
- Kerwin Mathews – Film and television actor
- Walter Matthau – Oscar-winning film actor
- MC Tee – Musician
- T. Allen McArtor – Business executive and FAA Administrator
- Cormac McCarthy – Pulitzer Prize-winning author and screenwriter
- Kevin McCarthy – Oscar-nominated film actor
- Joseph C. McConnell – Leading U.S. ace of the Korean War
- Tim McCoy – Film actor
- James McDivitt – Astronaut (Gemini 4, Apollo 9)
- Spanky McFarland – Child actor known for playing Spanky in the Our Gang series of short-subject comedies of the 1930s and 1940s
- George McGovern – Senator from South Dakota, 1972 presidential nominee
- Andrew J. McIntyre – Cinematographer and friend of movie star Clark Gable who enlisted together in the Army Air Force during World War II
- Robert McNamara and the Whiz Kids – Ford Motor Company executives
- Joseph McNeil – USAF major general best known for being a member of the Greensboro Four—a group of African American college students who, on February 1, 1960, sat down at a segregated Woolworth's lunch counter in downtown Greensboro, North Carolina, challenging the store's policy of denying service to non-white customers
- Pamela Melroy – Astronaut (STS-92, STS-112, STS-120)
- Lee Mendelson – Six-time Emmy-winning animation producer and executive producer of many Peanuts animated specials
- Burgess Meredith – Oscar-nominated film, theater and TV actor and filmmaker
- James Meredith – Civil Rights figure; first African-American to attend the University of Mississippi
- Gary Merrill – Film actor

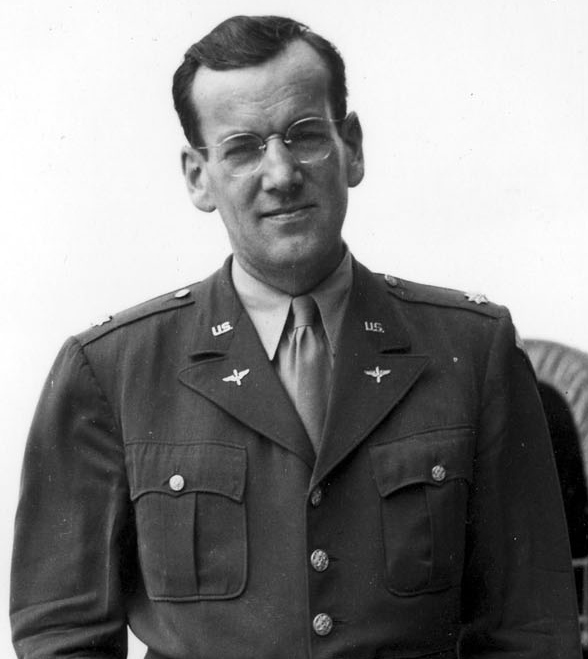
Major Glenn Miller

- Ray Milland – Oscar-winning film actor and director who served in the British Army and later as a civilian flight instructor with the U.S. Army Air Force during WWII
- Glenn Miller – Grammy Award-winning musician and band leader
- Walter M. Miller, Jr. – Science fiction author
- John Purroy Mitchel – 95th Mayor of New York City
- Billy Mitchell – Grandfather of the U.S. Air Force.
- Cameron Mitchell – Film actor
- Nicole Mitchell – TV meteorologist
- Dana Mohler-Faria – President, Bridgewater State College
- Rudy Moise – flight surgeon, lawyer, and politician
- George Montgomery – Film and television actor
- Clayton Moore – Television actor
- Robin Moore – Author of The Green Berets and The French Connection and Razzie Award-winning screenwriter
- Dodge Morgan – Single-handed sailor and entrepreneur
- Tad Mosel – Pulitzer Prize-winning playwright and one of the leading dramatists of hour-long teleplay genre for live television during the 1950s
- Charlie Munger – Billionaire investor
- Richard Murphy – Oscar-nominated screenwriter

== N ==
- Jack Narz – TV game show host
- George N. Neise – Film actor
- Barry Nelson – Film and television actor noted as the first actor to portray Ian Fleming's secret agent character James Bond
- Ralph Nelson – Oscar-nominated and Emmy Award-winning filmmaker who was a fighter pilot and flight instructor in the Army Air Corps during WWII
- Willie Nelson – Oscar-nominated and Grammy Award-winning musician, singer and songwriter
- Mike Nesmith – Guitarist, member of "The Monkees," and heir to the Liquid Paper fortune
- Jack Nicholson – Oscar-winning film actor, director, producer and screenwriter
- Cody Nickson – American television personality, winner of The Amazing Race 30, contestant of Big Brother 19
- Charles Nordhoff – American writer best known for The Bounty Trilogy who served in the Ambulance Corps during World War I, as well as a military aviator in both the French Lafayette Flying Corps and the U.S. Army Air Service
- Chuck Norris – B-movie actor

== O ==
- Edmond O'Brien – Oscar-winning film actor
- Donald O'Connor – Emmy and Golden Globe Award-winning film actor
- Jarvis Offutt – U.S. Army Air Service aviator and namesake of Offutt Air Force Base
- Robin Olds – Two-war triple flying ace
- George Olesen – Cartoonist
- Patrick O'Neal – Film actor
- Robert Osborne – Actor, film historian and author best known as the primary host of the cable channel Turner Classic Movies (TCM) for more than 20 years

== P ==
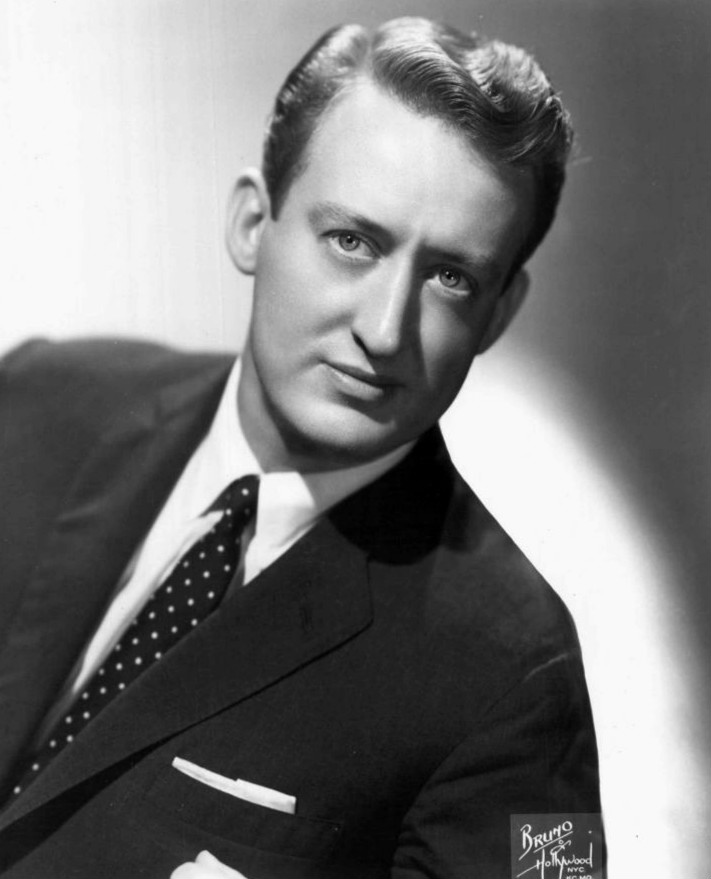
Tom Poston

- Reverend Bernard T. Pagano – Roman Catholic priest and high school teacher who was falsely accused and arrested in 1979 for committing nine robberies in Delaware and Pennsylvania, in which an otherwise polite man held store clerks at gunpoint, demanding money. Pagano was cleared of the charges when the real culprit Ronald W. Clouser turned himself in. Pagano's story was dramatized in the 1981 film The Gentleman Bandit (directed by Jonathan Kaplan), in which Pagano was technical advisor. Pagano later taught theology at Notre Dame High School in Easton, Pennsylvania in the late 1990s and early 2000s.
- Jack Palance – Oscar-winning film actor
- Gregg Palmer – Film and TV actor
- Ron Paul – Member of Congress; 1988, 2008 & 2012 Presidential candidate
- John Payne – Film actor
- Stacy Pearsall – Combat photographer, two-time winner of the NPPA Military Photographer of the Year award
- Leo Penn – Film director
- Leonard Pennario – Concert pianist and composer
- Heather Penney – Former Air Force major and F-16 fighter pilot whose mission (along with three other pilots, including USAF Major Daniel Caine, Captain Brandon Rasmussen and Lieutenant General Marc Sasseville) on 9/11 was to find United Flight 93 and destroy it however they could, including ramming the aircraft.
- Oscar Francis Perdomo – "Ace in a Day"
- Sonny Perdue – 81st Governor of Georgia.
- H. Ross Perot, Jr. – Member of the Forbes 400 and son of Ross Perot
- Rick Perry – 47th Governor of Texas
- House Peters Jr. – Actor
- Paul Picerni – Actor
- Slim Pickens – Actor and rodeo performer
- William H. Pitsenbarger – Enlisted recipient of the Medal of Honor
- Robert M. Polich, Sr. – Recipient of Distinguished Flying Cross and POW of Stalag Luft III
- Gregg Popovich – Head Coach of the NBA professional basketball team San Antonio Spurs
- Wiley Post – Famed American aviator during the interwar period and the first pilot to fly solo around the world. Also known for his work in high-altitude flying, Post helped develop one of the first pressure suits and discovered the jet stream.
- Tom Poston – Television comedian
- H.C. Potter – Film director and producer
- Jody Powell – White House Press Secretary
- Francis Gary Powers – CIA U-2 spy plane pilot
- Robert Preston – Oscar-nominated film and Broadway actor
- Robert Prosky – Film actor
- Mario Puzo – Author of The Godfather (1969) and Oscar-winning screenwriter of the 1972 film adaptation and its sequels

== Q ==
- Elwood R. "Pete" Quesada – Aviation pioneer
- Robin Quivers – Co-host of The Howard Stern Show

== R ==
- Dennis Rader – BTK Serial Killer
- John Randolph – Broadway and film actor
- Brandon Rasmussen – Air Force Captain and F-16 fighter pilot whose mission (along with three other pilots, including USAF Major Heather Penney, Major Daniel Caine and Lieutenant General Marc Sasseville) on 9/11 was to find United Flight 93 and destroy it however they could, including ramming the aircraft.
- Gene Rayburn – Emmy-nominated radio and television personality
- Gene Raymond – Film actor
- Ronald Reagan – B-movie actor and 40th President of the United States
- Chuck Reed – Mayor of San Jose, California and his daughter, Kim Campbell, a decorated Iraq War pilot
- George Reeves – Television and film actor
- William Rehnquist – 16th Chief Justice of the United States
- Carl Reiner – Emmy and Grammy Award-winning film and television actor, comedian, filmmaker, producer and screenwriter
- John Rich – Emmy Award-winning film and television director
- Lloyd Richards – Emmy Award-nominated television director, theatre director, actor, and dean of the Yale School of Drama
- Eddie Rickenbacker – Leading American World War I flying ace
- Roy Riegels – All-American football player
- Robinson Risner – Decorated USAF General and Vietnam POW.
- R. Stephen Ritchie – USAF Ace in the Vietnam War
- Martin Ritt – Oscar-nominated filmmaker
- Hal Roach – Oscar-winning producer and screenwriter
- Tom Robbins – American novelist known for his seriocomedies (Even Cowgirls Get the Blues, Tibetan Peach Pie)
- Gene Roddenberry – Emmy Award-nominated television and film producer
- Marion Rodgers – Communications Specialist, Former Tuskegee Airman
- Gilbert Roland – Golden Globe Award-nominated film and television actor
- Frank Ronzio – Film and TV actor best known for playing Litmus in Escape from Alcatraz
- Stuart Roosa – Astronaut (Apollo 14)
- Elliott Roosevelt – Son of Franklin D. Roosevelt
- Quentin Roosevelt – Youngest son of Theodore Roosevelt, killed in aerial combat as a pursuit pilot in World War I
- Leonard Rosenman – Oscar-winning film composer
- Bob Ross – Painter, art instructor and television host
- Chelcie Ross – Film actor
- Dan Rowan – Comedian and television actor
- Joe Mack Roy – TikTok star known for his "Pop Watch" videos
- Kurt Russell – Emmy and Golden Globe-nominated film and television actor
- Dick Rutan – Aviation record-holder and aircraft designer

== S ==
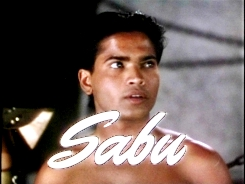
Sabu

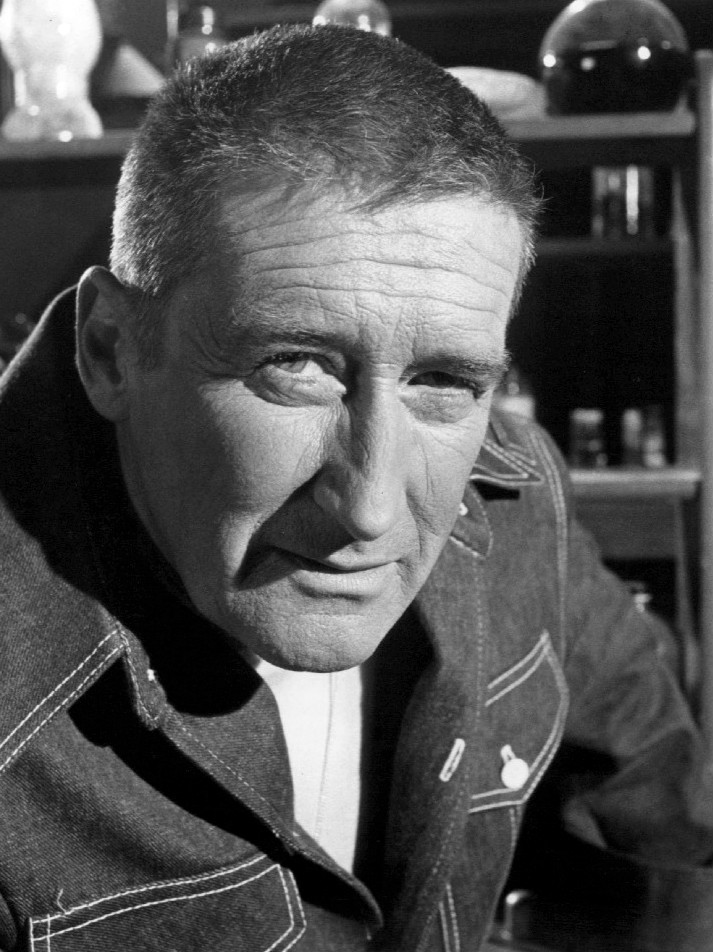
Mickey Spillane

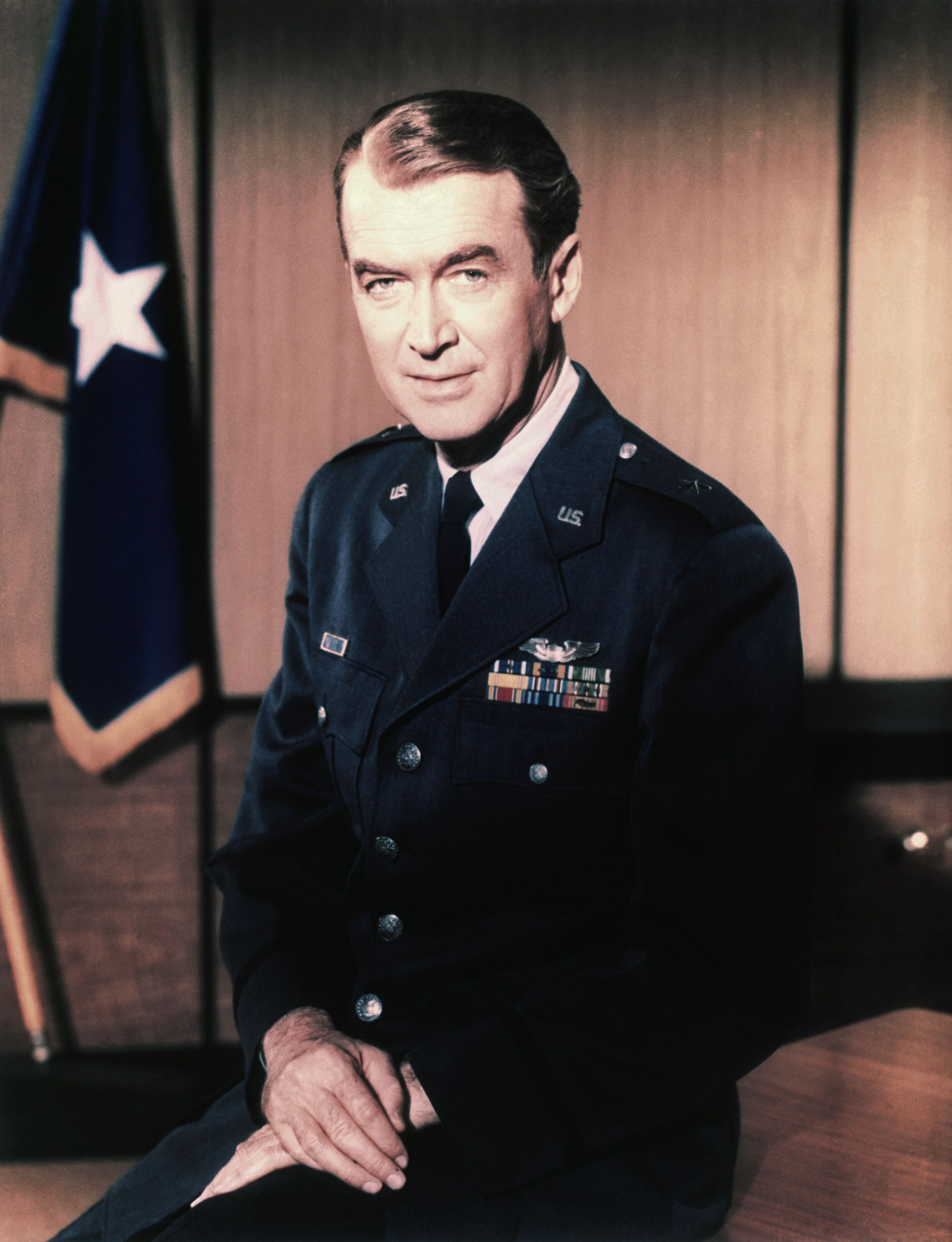
Brig. Gen. Stewart ca. 1960

- Sabu – Film actor
- William Sachs – Film director, producer and screenwriter (Joe)
- James Salter – Novelist
- Tommy Sands – Pop music singer and film actor
- Mark Sanford – 115th Governor of South Carolina
- Marc Sasseville – Retired Air Force lieutenant general and F-16 fighter pilot whose mission (along with three other pilots, including USAF Major Heather Penney, Major Daniel Caine and Captain Brandon Rasmussen) on 9/11 was to find United Flight 93 and destroy it however they could, including ramming the aircraft. Sasseville later was the 12th Vice Chief of the National Guard Bureau.
- John Monk Saunders – Oscar-winning screenwriter, film director and novelist
- William Schallert – Emmy Award-nominated actor
- Roy Scheider – Oscar-nominated film and TV actor
- Bob Schieffer – Television journalist
- Josef Schmid – NASA flight surgeon
- Tex Schramm – President and general manager of the Dallas Cowboys
- Rusty Schweickart – Astronaut (Apollo 9)
- Dick Scobee – Astronaut, killed in Space Shuttle Challenger Disaster
- David Scott – Astronaut (Gemini 8, Apollo 9, and Apollo 15)
- Donald E. Scott – All-American college football quarterback
- Dr. Seuss – Famed American children's author, political cartoonist, illustrator, poet, Emmy Award-winning animator and filmmaker
- Carroll Shelby – Automotive designer, racecar driver and entrepreneur who was a bomber pilot in World War II
- Jim Siedow – Film and TV actor
- Gregory Sierra – Film and TV actor
- Lance Sijan – Medal of Honor recipient
- John Simon – Literary, theater and film critic
- Neil Simon – Four-time Oscar-nominated and Golden Globe Award-winning screenwriter, playwright and author
- Sinbad – Actor and comedian
- Tom Skerritt – Film actor
- Richard X. Slattery – Film and TV actor
- Deke Slayton – Mercury and Apollo-Soyuz Test Project astronaut
- Jack Smight – Theater, film and television director
- Dean Smith – American men's college basketball head coach for 36 years at the University of North Carolina at Chapel Hill
- Gretchen Smith – Founder of the charity organization "Code of Vets"
- Hal Smith – Film and television actor
- Tubby Smith – NCAA Men's Basketball Coach
- William Smith – Film and television actor and champion arm-wrestler
- Carl Spaatz – Pioneer airman, first Chief of Staff of the Air Force
- Aaron Spelling – Film and television producer
- Arnold Spielberg – Father of Oscar-winning filmmaker Steven Spielberg and electrical engineer who co-designed the GE-225 mainframe computer and the first computer-controlled "point of sale" cash register
- Mickey Spillane – Crime novelist
- Caroll Spinney – Puppeteer, cartoonist and artist most famous for playing Big Bird and Oscar the Grouch on Sesame Street
- G.D. Spradlin – Film actor known for The Godfather: Part II (1974)
- Thomas P. Stafford – Astronaut and aviator (Gemini 6A, Gemini 9A, Apollo 10)
- Bill Stealey – Business CEO and co-founder of MicroProse
- David Steeves – Pilot who crashed in the Sierra Nevada and endured a nearly two month survival ordeal.
- George Steinbrenner – Team owner of the New York Yankees
- Robert Sterling – Film actor
- Craig Stevens – Television actor
- George Stevens Jr. – Oscar-nominated producer, TV director, playwright and author
- Ted Stevens – Senator from Alaska
- James Stewart – Oscar-winning film actor
- Bert Stiles – Author
- Spencer Stone – Air Force staff sergeant who, along with friends Alek Skarlatos and Anthony Sadler and three other passengers, as well as an off-duty train driver, disarmed and subdued a solitary, heavily armed Moroccan terrorist in August 2015, while travelling from Amsterdam on a high speed, Paris-bound train
- Ralph Story – Television personality who was a P-51 fighter pilot and flight instructor during World War II
- Dale E. Stovall – USAF General, decorated Vietnam War search and rescue pilot
- Gil Stratton – Actor and sportscaster (Stalag 17, The Wild One)
- Joseph Strick – Oscar-winning film director, producer and screenwriter
- Woody Strode – Golden Globe Award-nominated film actor and football player
- John Sturges – Oscar-nominated filmmaker
- Preston Sturges – Oscar-winning filmmaker
- Chesley Sullenberger – Airline pilot, hero of Miracle on the Hudson
- Bruce Sundlun – 71st governor of Rhode Island
- Charles Sweeney – Pilot who flew the Fat Man bomb to Nagasaki.
- Dolph Sweet – Film and TV actor
- David Swift – WGA Award-nominated screenwriter, animator, director and producer
- Jack Swigert – Astronaut and congressman-elect

== T ==
- Don Taylor – Actor and filmmaker known for directing Tom Sawyer (1973) and Echoes of a Summer (1976) starring Jodie Foster. Also directed Damien: Omen II (1978).
- Fred Taylor – College basketball coach
- Kenneth M. Taylor – World War II ace at the Attack on Pearl Harbor
- Jack Teixeira – American airman of the Massachusetts Air National Guard who was convicted on espionage charges in 2024 after leaking hundreds of classified Pentagon documents
- Hunter S. Thompson – WGA Award-nominated author and journalist
- Stephen W. Thompson – First U.S. aviator to shoot down an enemy aircraft.
- Bobby Thomson – Major League Baseball player
- Leo K. Thorsness – Medal of Honor recipient and Vietnam POW.
- Harrison R. Thyng – Two-war ace and Senate candidate
- Paul Tibbets – Commander of the Enola Gay
- Mel Tillis – Country music singer
- Grant Tinker – Peabody Award-winning television executive who was chairman and CEO of NBC
- Kenneth Tobey – Actor known for It Came from Beneath the Sea (1955) and The Candidate (1972)
- Tuskegee Airmen – First African-American military pilots
- Archie R. Twitchell – Actor and test pilot known for Out of the Past (1947), Sunset Boulevard (1950) and The Gunfighter (1950)

== U ==
- Stewart Udall – 37th United States Secretary of the Interior

== V ==
- Dick Van Dyke – Emmy Award-winning and Golden Globe-nominated film and television actor, comedian, writer, singer and dancer
- Jerry Van Dyke – Emmy Award-nominated film and television actor, musician and comedian
- Melvin Van Peebles – Emmy Award-winning filmmaker, actor, playwright, novelist and composer best known for Sweet Sweetback's Baadasssss Song, regarded as one of the earliest and most successful films in the blaxploitation genre
- Richard Verma – American diplomat serving as the deputy secretary of state for management and resources since April 2023

== W ==
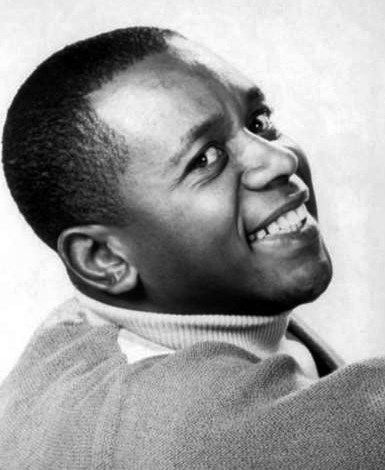
Flip Wilson

- Joseph A. Walker – X-15 test pilot
- Kenneth N. Walker – Medal of Honor recipient, airpower visionary
- George Wallace – 45th Governor of Alabama and presidential candidate
- Walter Wanger – Oscar-nominated producer (Stagecoach, Invasion of the Body Snatchers, Cleopatra)
- Fred Ward – Actor and producer
- Jack L. Warner – Oscar-winning producer and Hollywood film executive
- Jack Webb – Film and television actor, director, and producer
- George Welch – World War II flying ace, decorated for heroism at the Attack on Pearl Harbor
- William A. Wellman – Oscar-winning filmmaker who, during World War I, was a fighter pilot in the French Foreign Legion, as a driver in the Norton-Harjes Ambulance Corps on the Western Front, and as a flight instructor in the United States Army Air Service. He was also the first American to join Escadrille N.87 in the Lafayette Flying Corps of the French Air Force during the war. As a fighter pilot, he is credited with three confirmed kills and five probables.
- David Westheimer – Novelist
- Donald E. Westlake – Oscar-nominated screenwriter and novelist
- Ed White – Astronaut (Gemini 4, first American to walk in space)
- Frank D. White – 41st Governor of Arkansas
- Cornelius Vanderbilt Whitney – Businessman
- John Hay Whitney – Newspaper publisher and Ambassador to Great Britain
- Thornton Wilder – Novelist and playwright (The Bridge of San Luis Rey, Our Town, The Skin of Our Teeth)
- Charles Willeford – Novelist and poet (Cockfighter, Miami Blues, The Woman Chaser, The Burnt Orange Heresy)
- Grant Williams – Film, theater and television actor
- John Williams – Five-time Oscar-winning film composer
- John Edward Williams – National Book Award-winning author, editor and professor (Butcher's Crossing, Stoner, Augustus)
- Gordon Willis – Oscar-nominated cinematographer
- Flip Wilson – Emmy, Grammy and Golden Globe Award-winning actor and comedian
- Heather Wilson – U.S. Member of Congress from New Mexico
- Jason Wingreen – Film and television actor known as the original voice of Boba Fett in Star Wars: Episode V – The Empire Strikes Back
- Reality Winner – Whistleblower
- Harris Wofford – U.S. Senator from Pennsylvania
- Morgan Woodward – Film and television actor
- Alfred Worden – Astronaut (Apollo 15)
- James C. "Jim" Wright, Jr. – U.S. Representative from Texas and 56th Speaker of the House
- William Wyler – Three-time Oscar-winning filmmaker

== Y ==
- Chuck Yeager – Air Force test pilot who became the first person to exceed the speed of sound in level flight
- Coleman Young – Mayor of Detroit (1974–1994)

== Z ==
- Louis Zamperini – Olympic distance runner
- Darryl F. Zanuck – Three-time Oscar-winning film producer and studio executive
- Howard Zinn – Historian, playwright, philosopher, socialist intellectual
