= General Patterson =

General Patterson may refer to:

- Arthur Patterson (1917–1996), British Army major general
- Francis E. Patterson (1821–1862), Union Army brigadier general
- Grady Patterson (1924–2009), U.S. Air Force lieutenant general
- L. Eric Patterson (fl. 1970s–2020s), U.S. Air Force brigadier general
- Robert Patterson (general) (1792–1881), Union Army major general
- Thomas Patterson (Pennsylvania politician) (1764–1841), Pennsylvania Militia major general in the War of 1812

== See also ==
- John Paterson (New York politician) (1744–1808), Continental Army major general
- Attorney General Patterson (disambiguation)
