= Kevin J. Jacobsen =

United States Air Force general

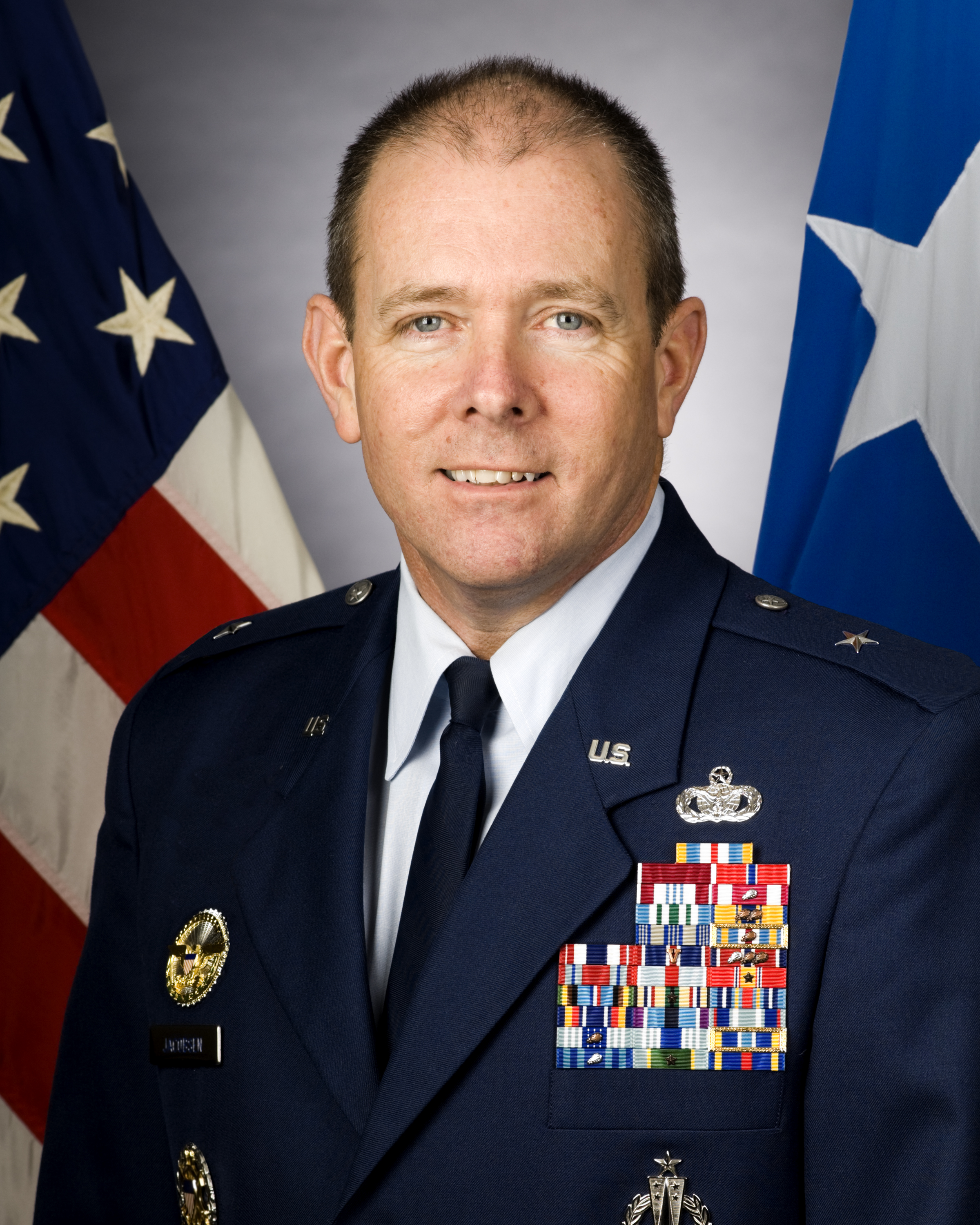
- Born: January 29, 1958 (age 68)
- Military career
- Allegiance: United States
- Branch: United States Air Force
- Service years: 1980 – 2014
- Rank: Brigadier General (Ret.)
- Commands: Air Force Office of Special Investigations
- Awards: 9 major decorations: Defense Superior Service Medal; National Intelligence Distinguished Service Medal; Legion of Merit; Bronze Star Medal; Defense Meritorious Service Medal; Meritorious Service Medal; Joint Service Commendation Medal; Air Force Commendation Medal; Air Force Achievement Medal

Kevin J. Jacobsen (born January 29, 1958) is a United States Air Force retired brigadier general (special agent) who served as the 16th Commander of the Air Force Office of Special Investigations (AFOSI), Quantico, VA. This field operating agency is responsible for providing commanders of U.S. Air Force activities independent, professional investigative services regarding fraud, counterintelligence, and major criminal matters. The investigations are conducted by a worldwide network of military and civilian special agents stationed at major U.S. Air Force installations and a variety of special operating locations.

== Education ==
Degrees

- Bachelor of Arts (BA), 1980, Slippery Rock University, Slippery Rock, Pa.
- Master of Arts (MA), 1980, Webster University, St. Louis, Mo.
- Master of Science (MS), 2001, Industrial College of the Armed Forces, Fort Lesley J. McNair, Washington D.C.

Leadership courses

- 1987, Squadron Officer School, Maxwell AFB, Ala.
- 1995, Air Command and Staff College, Maxwell AFB, Ala.
- 1995, Armed Forces Staff College, Norfolk, Va.
- 1997, Air War College, by seminar
- National Security Studies, 2004, Syracuse University, Syracuse, NY
- Capstone General and Flag Officer Course, 2011, National Defense University, Fort Lesley J. McNair, Washington D.C.

== Military career ==
Jacobsen entered the Air Force in 1980. He spent the majority of his military career as an AFOSI special agent, where he conducted and supervised felony-level criminal, fraud, and counterintelligence investigations and operations. He has commanded at the detachment, squadron and wing levels, and has led combat-enabling operations in Iraq and Afghanistan. Jacobsen also served on the Joint Staff.

=== AFOSI appointment ===
Jacobsen officially took command of AFOSI during a change of command ceremony held at Joint Base Andrews, MD, on April 6 in Hangar 3. The ceremony was hosted by Lieutenant General Marc E. Rogers, Inspector General of the Air Force. Jacobsen was still a colonel when he assumed command.

Leading up to his selection as AFOSI Commander, Jacobsen served as the Special Investigations director for the Office of the Secretary of the Air Force, at the Pentagon, Washington, D.C., where he led a directorate in developing and implementing all Air Force-level plans and policies concerning criminal investigations and counterintelligence operations. Colonel Jacobsen represented the Air Force in all policy, planning, resource, and program matters concerning criminal investigations, counterintelligence, and counter-threat operational issues with the Department of Defense and other governmental departments and agencies.

=== Assignments ===
- June 1980 - August 1984, Titan II ICBM missile launch officer and crew commander, 390th Strategic Missile Wing, Davis-Monthan AFB, Ariz.
- August 1984 - June 1986, Deputy Commander, AFOSI Detachment 2140, Langley AFB, Va.
- June 1986 - June 1988, Commander, AFOSI Detachment 2101, Pope AFB, N.C.
- June 1988 - August 1992, personal security adviser to the Secretary of the Air Force; and assistant Chief, Protective Service/Antiterrorism Branch, Headquarters AFOSI, Bolling AFB, Washington, D.C.
- August 1992 - August 1993, Commander, Counterintelligence Support Activity, Republic of Honduras
- August 1993 - June 1994, Commander, AFOSI Detachment 309, Hurlburt Field, Fla.
- June 1994 - August 1995, student, Air Command and Staff College, Maxwell AFB, Ala.
- August 1995 - June 1998, counterintelligence action officer, Joint Staff, the Pentagon, Washington, D.C.
- June 1998 - June 2000, Commander, AFOSI Detachment 515, Ramstein Air Base, Germany
- June 2000 - June 2001, student, Industrial College of the Armed Forces, Fort Lesley J. McNair, Washington, D.C.
- June 2001 - November 2002, assistant Director for Current Operations, and Chief, Criminal Division, Headquarters AFOSI, Andrews AFB, Md.
- November 2002 - July 2003, Commander, 24th Expeditionary Field Investigations Squadron, Southwest Asia
- July 2003 - June 2005, special assistant to the Deputy Under Secretary of Defense, Counterintelligence and Security, Office of the Secretary of Defense, the Pentagon, Washington, D.C.
- June 2005 - May 2007, Commander, 2nd Field Investigations Region, Langley AFB, Va.
- May 2007 - April 2010, Director, Special Investigations Directorate, Office of the Air Force Inspector General, Headquarters U.S. Air Force, Washington, D.C.
- April 2010 – September 2014, Commander, Air Force Office of Special Investigations, Joint Base Andrews, Md.

Joint Assignments

- August 1995 - June 1998, counterintelligence action officer, Joint Staff, the Pentagon, Washington, D.C., as a major and lieutenant colonel
- July 2003 - June 2005, special assistant to the Deputy Under Secretary of Defense, Counterintelligence and Security, Office of the Secretary of Defense, the Pentagon, Washington, D.C., as a colonel

=== Effective dates of promotion ===
Insignia	Rank	Date
	Brigadier General	May 7, 2010
	Colonel	January 1, 2003
	Lieutenant Colonel	October 1, 1997
	Major	September 1, 1993
	Captain	September 1, 1984
	First Lieutenant	May 24, 1982
	Second Lieutenant	May 24, 1980

=== Major awards and decorations ===
Jacobsen is a recipient of the following:

1st Row	Air Force Distinguished Service Medal	Defense Superior Service Medal	
2nd Row	Legion of Merit with oak leaf cluster	Bronze Star Medal	Defense Meritorious Service Medal
3rd Row	Armed Forces Expeditionary Medal with oak leaf cluster	Meritorious Service Medal with silver oak leaf cluster	Joint Service Commendation Medal
4th Row	Air Force Commendation Medal with oak leaf cluster	Air Force Achievement Medal	National Intelligence Distinguished Service Medal
5th Row	Southwest Asia Service Medal with campaign star	Global War on Terrorism Service Medal	Humanitarian Service Medal

- Order of the Sword
- Defense Intelligence Agency Director's Award
- The John W. Wrentmore Memorial Leadership Award

=== Uniform identification badges ===

Air Force Missile Badge
Air Force Force Protection Badge
Office of the Secretary of Defense Identification Badge
Office of the Joint Chiefs of Staff Identification Badge
Headquarters Air Force Badge
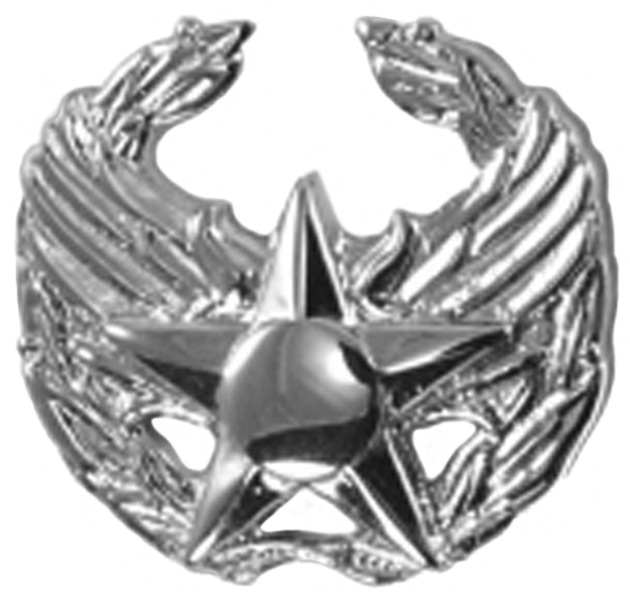
Air Force Commander's Insignia
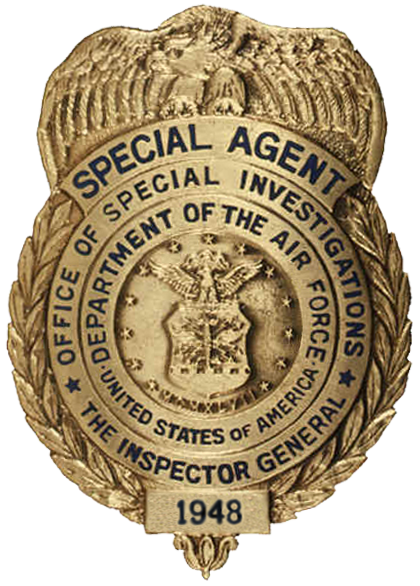
Air Force Special Agent Badge

== Family life ==
Jacobsen and his wife Karen live in Annapolis, MD. They have two sons, Robby, who is a pro baseball player for the Potomac Nationals, a subsidiary of the Washington Nationals; and Steven, in his last year at Frostburg State University in Maryland.

== See also ==
- List of Commanders of the Air Force Office of Special Investigations
- List of U.S. Air Force acronyms and expressions
- List of U.S. Air Force bases
- List of Famous Airmen

== Notes ==
Military offices
Preceded by BG Dana A. Simmons	Commander of the Air Force Office of Special Investigations; March 2010 – May 2014	Succeeded by BG Keith M. Givens
