= Gary W. Schenkel =

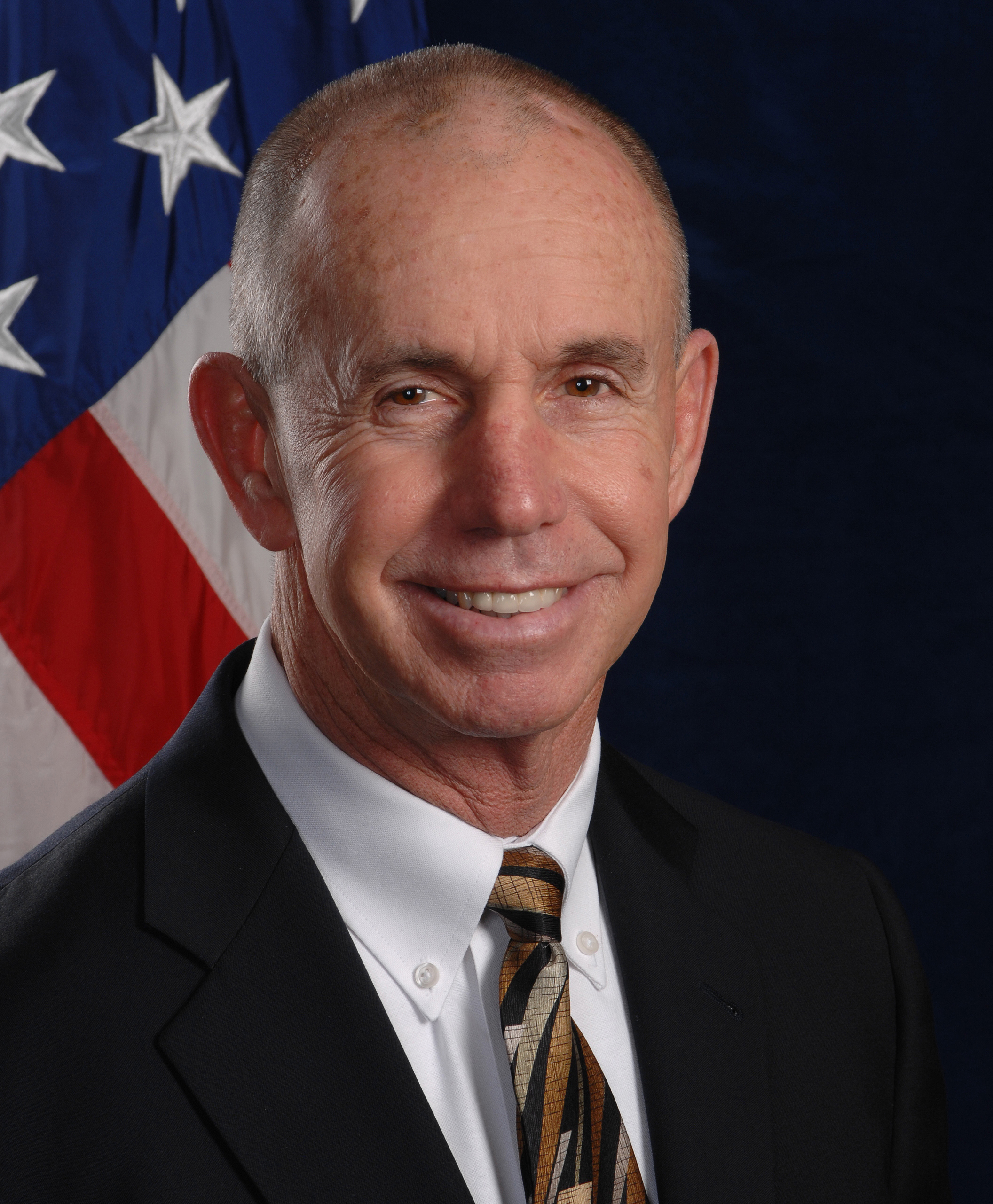

Executive Director of Chicago's Office of Emergency Management and Communications
- In office June 2011 – Incumbent
- President: Barack H. Obama
- Vice President: Joseph Biden

Personal details
- Education: Lindenwood University, California State University

Military service
- Allegiance: United States of America
- Branch/service: United States Marine Corps
- Rank: Lieutenant colonel

Gary W. Schenkel is, as of June 2011, the Executive Director of the city Office of Emergency Management and Communications (OEMC) in Chicago, Illinois. Prior to this position Schenkel was the director of the Federal Protective Service(FPS), one of the six divisions of the National Protection and Programs Directorate of the U.S. Department of Homeland Security from March 2007 until July 2010. FPS is the national law enforcement agency responsible for the General Service Agency's (GSA) inventory of over 9,000 buildings located in all 56 states, US territories and protectorates.

A retired United States Marine Corps lieutenant colonel, Schenkel served in the enlisted ranks for 8 of his nearly 30 years of service. As an infantryman and infantry officer, he gained experience in a wide range of arenas, including organizational transformation efforts, security planning for public facilities, logistical planning and execution and business administration.

Schenkel took the helm at FPS, following the February 2007 announcement of a new effort to adjust the execution of the FPS mission and to improve FPS's administration and financial management. In his first year, he developed a sequential financial system and paid more than 22,000 past due invoices dating back to 1999. He restructured the law enforcement agency and trained over 90% of his uniformed division in facility security assessments as well as law enforcement roles providing a more versatile officer capable of handling the wide range of responsibilities necessary to the protection of GSA facilities and support of Federal law enforcement functions.

Prior to joining the Federal Protective Service, Schenkel served as Assistant Federal Security Director for the Transportation Security Administration (TSA) at Chicago Midway Airport, a position he held from February 2004 until his selection as Director for FPS in April 2007. At Midway he was responsible for security operations and planning, and worked to respond to the new challenges of securing the homeland. In this position, Schenkel oversaw the strategic planning and business management of TSA operations at the airport and worked with government partners and private sector service providers to ensure the highest levels of security at the airport without sacrificing efficiency and service. His portfolio included the departments of Human Resources, Finance, Customer Service and Stakeholder. Schenkel was responsible for operational planning for specific security events such as periods of high travel and elevated threat levels.

Before joining TSA, Schenkel served from 2000-2004 as the Assistant Deputy Superintendent of the Chicago Police Department(CPD), where he was one of only two civilians in the department's history to be given operational command over uniformed officers in the department. Schenkel joined the CPD specifically to help guide the department's efforts in recruiting and training officers, deploying new technology and operational concepts to meet new challenges in fighting and reducing crime. In addition, he headed the department's anti-terrorism efforts following the attacks of September 11, 2001.

Schenkel is a 29-year veteran of the United States Marine Corps, having retired as a lieutenant colonel in 2000. In his three decades of service, he served primarily in infantry units and garnered significant leadership experience, including command of 1,200 Marines during combat operations in Operation Desert Storm(1991). In addition, he developed nuclear response plans and executed various logistical projects, including what was then the largest single movement of nuclear weapons in U.S. history. Prior to retiring from the Marine Corps, Schenkel served as Operations Officer at the Marine Corps Warfighting Laboratory in Quantico, Virginia, where he focused on transformational and cultural change, urban combat and long-range planning related to the Marine mission in the 21st century.

In June 2010, Schenkel was transferred to DHS Headquarters where he served as the Acting Assistant Secretary for State and Local Law Enforcement. In March 2011 he met Mayor (elect) Rahm Emanuel and was asked to serve as the City's Executive Director for Emergency Management and Communication. He moved back to the City of Chicago and took over that post in June 2011. Schenkel retired from this position in 2016 and presently works as a Self Employed Consultant for IT integration and delivery of public safety and service delivery.

Schenkel is a graduate of Lindenwood University in St. Charles, Missouri., and California State University in Hayward, California.

Government offices
Preceded by Unknown	Director of the Federal Protective Service; March 2007 – July 2010	Succeeded by L. Eric Patterson
