= Dana A. Simmons =

United States Air Force general

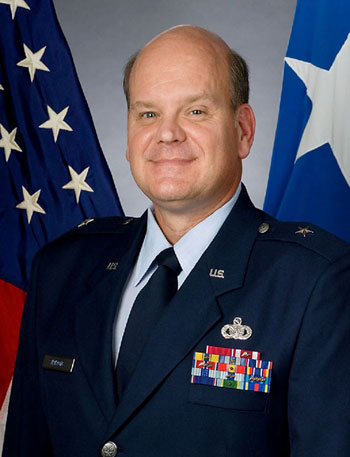
- Military career
- Allegiance: United States
- Branch: United States Air Force
- Service years: 1977 – 2010
- Rank: Brigadier General (Ret.)
- Commands: Air Force Office of Special Investigations
- Awards: Air Force Distinguished Service Medal; Legion of Merit; Air Force Meritorious Service Medal; Air Force Commendation Medal; Air Force Achievement Medal; National Intelligence Superior Service Medal

Dana A. Simmons is a retired United States Air Force Brigadier General (Special Agent) who served as the 15th Commander of the United States Air Force Office of Special Investigations (AFOSI), which is the investigative agency of the United States Air Force. He took command of AFOSI in June 2005. Prior to that, he was the Vice Commander of AFOSI from March 2004 to June 2005. In March 2010, he ceded command to BG Kevin J. Jacobsen.

== Education ==
In 1977, Simmons received a Bachelor of Arts from Texas State University. Then in 1983, he graduated from the Air Force's Squadron Officer School. Then in 1984, he attained a Master of Arts from Webster University. Then in 1989, he graduated from the Air Command and Staff College, followed by graduation from the Air War College in 1997.

== Military career ==
=== AFOSI appointment ===
Simmons was appointed Commander of AFOSI in June 2005, after serving as Vice Commander from March 2004. In May 2009, he also told CBS that AFOSI was actively protecting against hacker threats against the Air Force and United States.

=== Assignments ===
- 1977, Commissioned though the Air Force Reserve Officer Training Corps
- Sept. 1977 – August 1979, Flight Commander, 100th Security Police Squadron, Beale AFB, California
- August 1979 – February 1981, Operations Officer for the 3546th USAF Recruiting Squadron in Houston, Texas.
- February 1981 – March 1983, Chief of the Standards Branch, HQ USAF Recruiting Service in Randolph AFB, Texas.
- March 1983 – December 1985, Operations Officer, AFOSI Detachment 1040, in Randolph AFB, Texas
- January 1986 – July 1988, Commander, AFOSI Detachment 6940, Ankara Air Station, Turkey
- July 1988- June 1989, Simmons was a Student, Air Command and Staff College, Maxwell AFB, Alabama
- July 1989 – September 1991, Simmons was the Chief of the Counterintelligence Collections Management Branch, HQ AFOSI, Bolling AFB, Washington, D.C.
- September 1991 – March 1994, Commander, AFOSI Detachment 214, Howard AFB, Panama
- March 1994 – July 1996, Vice Commander, AFOSI 2nd Field Investigations Region, Langley AFB, Virginia
- July 1996 – July 1997, Student, Air War College, Maxwell AFB, Alabama
- July 1997 – July 1999, Commander, AFOSI 43rd Field Investigations Squadron, Peterson AFB, Colorado
- July 1999 – May 2001, Commander, AFOSI 62nd Field Investigations Squadron, Yokota AB, Japan
- May 2001 – March 2004, Commander, AFOSI 5th Field Investigations Region, Ramstein AB, Germany
- March 2004 – June 2005, Vice Commander, Air Force Office of Special Investigations, Andrews AFB, Maryland
- June 2005 – March 2010, Commander, Headquarters Air Force Office of Special Investigations, Andrews AFB, Maryland

Simmons retired from the Air Force on 1 April 2010.

=== Effective dates of promotion ===
Insignia	Rank	Date
	Brigadier General	April 5, 2005
	Colonel	August 1, 1999
	Lieutenant Colonel	November 1, 1993
	Major	August 21, 1988
	Captain	May 21, 1981
	First Lieutenant	May 21, 1979
	Second Lieutenant	May 21, 1977

=== Major awards and decorations ===
Simmons is a recipient of the following:

1st Row	Air Force Distinguished Service Medal	Legion of Merit	Meritorious Service Medal with six oak leaf clusters
2nd Row	Air Force Commendation Medal with oak leaf cluster	Air Force Achievement Medal with oak leaf cluster	National Intelligence Superior Service Medal

- Air Force Office of Special Investigations Lance P. Sijan Award Recipient
- 2009 Outstanding Advocate for Women in Federal Law Enforcement Award

== See also ==
- List of Commanders of the Air Force Office of Special Investigations
- Colleen L. McGuire (USACIDC)

== Notes ==
Military offices
Preceded by BG L. Eric Patterson	Commander of the Air Force Office of Special Investigations; June 2005 – April 2010	Succeeded by BG Kevin J. Jacobsen
