= The Gentleman Bandit (1981 film) =

1981 TV movie

- Written by: Milan Stitt
- Directed by: Jonathan Kaplan
- Country of origin: United States
- Original language: English

Production
- Producer: John E. Quill
- Running time: 98 minutes
- Production company: Highgate Pictures
- Budget: $2 million

Original release
- Release: May 6, 1981

The Gentleman Bandit is a 1981 TV movie directed by Jonathan Kaplan and starring Ralph Waite. It is based on the real story of Reverend Bernard Thomas Pagano.

== Plot ==
A priest is accused of armed robbery by various eyewitnesses.

== Cast ==
- Ralph Waite as Reverend Pagano
- Jerry Zaks as his lawyer
- Estelle Parsons as a parishioner
- Giancarlo Esposito as Jamie

== Production ==
Until the eve of the first screening, the working title for the film was The Bandit Priest.

The film was based on a true story of the Reverend Bernard Thomas Pagano who was arrested in 1979 for five armed robberies and one attempted robberies. Eventually another man, Ronald W. Clouser, confessed to the crimes.

Writer Milan Stitt spent a week interviewing Pagano, his attorney, friends and parishioners in December 1979. He wrote the script in four days. Pagano, a native of Newark, New Jersey, served five years as a chaplain at the VA hospital in Lyons and East Orange in the 1990s, according to Tom Malek-Jones, the chief chaplain for the facility. Pagano, himself a veteran of the U.S. Army Air Forces during World War II, was considered "a valuable asset for his work with veterans of that era and did not seem like a robber", Malek-Jones said.

Filming took place in New York City and Westchester County. It began on 19 January 1981. Pagano himself acted as technical advisor on the film. Pagano later taught theology at Notre Dame High School in Easton, Pennsylvania in the late 1990s and early 2000s.
