= Heather Penney =

United States Air Force officer (born 1974)

Heather Renee Penney
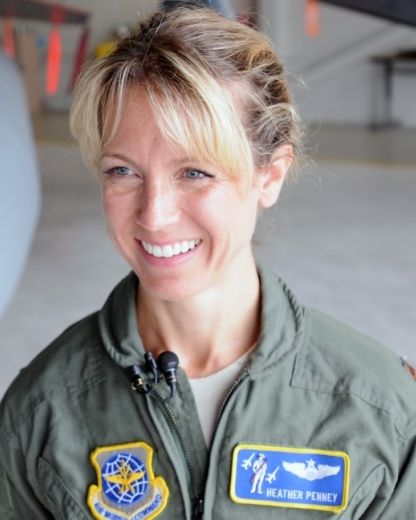
- Born: September 18, 1974 (age 52); Davis–Monthan Air Force Base, Arizona, U.S.
- Other name: Heather "Lucky" Penney
- Occupation: United States Air Force pilot
- Years active: 1998–2016
- Known for: Flying a ramming mission to prevent United Airlines Flight 93 from reaching Washington, D.C. during the September 11 attacks
- Military career
- Allegiance: United States
- Branch: Air National Guard
- Service years: 1998–2016
- Rank: Major
- Units: 121st Fighter Squadron; 201st Airlift Squadron
- Conflicts: Iraq War

Heather Renee Penney (born September 18, 1974) is an American defense policy expert at the Mitchell Institute for Aerospace Studies in Arlington, Virginia. She is best known for her role as a USAF lieutenant who was one of two F-16 pilots who flew their fighter jets, typically described as "unarmed" in an attempt to ram and down United Airlines Flight 93 before it reached Washington, D.C., during the September 11 attacks in 2001.

== Early life ==
Heather Penney majored in literature at Purdue University. Her father is retired Air Force Col. John Penney (born 1947), who served from 1970 during the Vietnam War and post war into 1979 and joined United Airlines in 1979 and served until his retirement in 2007.

== Career ==
=== Air National Guard ===
Penney was the "only woman in her fighter pilot training class and the only woman in her fighter squadron", the 121st Fighter Squadron of the District of Columbia Air National Guard, stationed at Joint Base Andrews. In 2009, she transferred to the 201st Airlift Squadron, which provides short notice worldwide transportation for the executive branch, members of Congress, Department of Defense officials and high-ranking U.S. and foreign dignitaries.

=== September 11 attacks ===
Penney, who was a first lieutenant at the time, was ordered into the air in her F-16 fighter jet alongside Marc H. Sasseville's aircraft at Andrews Air Force Base as the terrorist attacks were unfolding on September 11, 2001. They were ordered to down United Flight 93 before it reached the Washington, D.C. airspace, but because of the urgency, there was not enough time to outfit their aircraft with live ammunition other than the minimal 105 rounds of ball ammunition always carried to maintain trim. The pilots say that they believed the mission could only have been accomplished by ramming the airliner with their respective fighter jets. Penney and Sasseville were never able to intercept United 93, as it had crashed approximately 30 minutes before they took off.

In the Washington Post, Penney described her willingness to down Flight 93 without using live ammunition, saying that "there are things in this world that are more important than ourselves. [...] We belong to something greater than ourselves. As complex and diverse and discordant as it is, this thing, this idea called America, binds us together in citizenship and community and brotherhood".

=== Iraq War ===
She served two tours of duty in the Iraq war.

=== Private sector ===
In 2006, Penney joined Lockheed Martin as director of USAF Air Superiority Programs, Aviation Systems, Lockheed Martin Washington Operations while still serving part-time with the Air National Guard. During her time at Lockheed Martin, she spent a great deal of time working on the F-35 project.

On September 7, 2017, Penney and her father, Col. John Penney, gave a lecture, titled, “9/11 Perspectives” at National Air and Space Museum, as part of the GE Aviation Lecture Series. After leaving Lockheed in 2018, Penney joined the think tank Mitchell Institute for Aerospace Studies as a defense policy expert.

Penney appeared as an air power analyst on the television documentary series Bullet Points.

== Awards and honors ==
In 2012, Penney received the Emerging Voice Award from the Purdue University College of Liberal Arts and the Purdue Alumni Association. She was given the 2017 Outstanding Aviator Award from The Wings Club Foundation and the International Aviation Women's Association.
