= L. Eric Patterson =

Retired American United States Air Force Brigadier General (Special Agent)

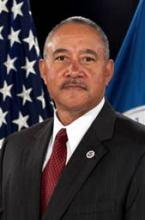

Director of the Federal Protective Service
- Incumbent
- Assumed office September 2010
- President: Barack Obama; Donald Trump; Joe Biden
- Deputy: Richard K. Cline
- Preceded by: Gary W. Schenkel

Commander of the Air Force Office of Special Investigations
- In office May 2001 – June 2005
- Preceded by: Francis X. Taylor
- Succeeded by: Dana A. Simmons

Personal details
- Education: Howard University (BS); Webster University (MA)

Military service
- Allegiance: United States
- Branch/service: United States Air Force
- Years of service: 1975 – 2005
- Rank: Brigadier General (Ret.)
- Commands: Air Force Office of Special Investigations
- Awards: Legion of Merit; Meritorious Service Medal; Air Force Commendation Medal

Leonard Eric Patterson is currently serving as the director of the Federal Protective Service. Patterson is also a retired United States Air Force Brigadier General (Special Agent) and was the 14th commander of the Air Force Office of Special Investigations (AFOSI), Andrews AFB, Maryland. As the AFOSI commander, Patterson oversaw AFOSI's worldwide network of military and civilian special agents stationed at major Air Force installations and a variety of special operating locations.

== Education ==
Patterson is a graduate of the Air Force Reserve Officer Training Corps at Howard University. He holds a Master of Business Administration from Webster University. Patterson is also a graduate of Squadron Officer School, Air Command and Staff College, Marine Corps Command and Staff College, and Air War College.

== Military career ==
Patterson entered the United States Air Force in 1975 as a missile launch officer. He became an AFOSI special agent in 1979 and commanded AFOSI units at the detachment, squadron and regional levels at numerous stateside and overseas locations. He conducted and supervised a variety of felony-level investigations common to AFOSI, with specialization in counterintelligence and protective service operations as well as oversight of special programs. Prior to his last position as Commander of AFOSI, the general was the operations director for AFOSI. Patterson is a native of Washington, D.C.

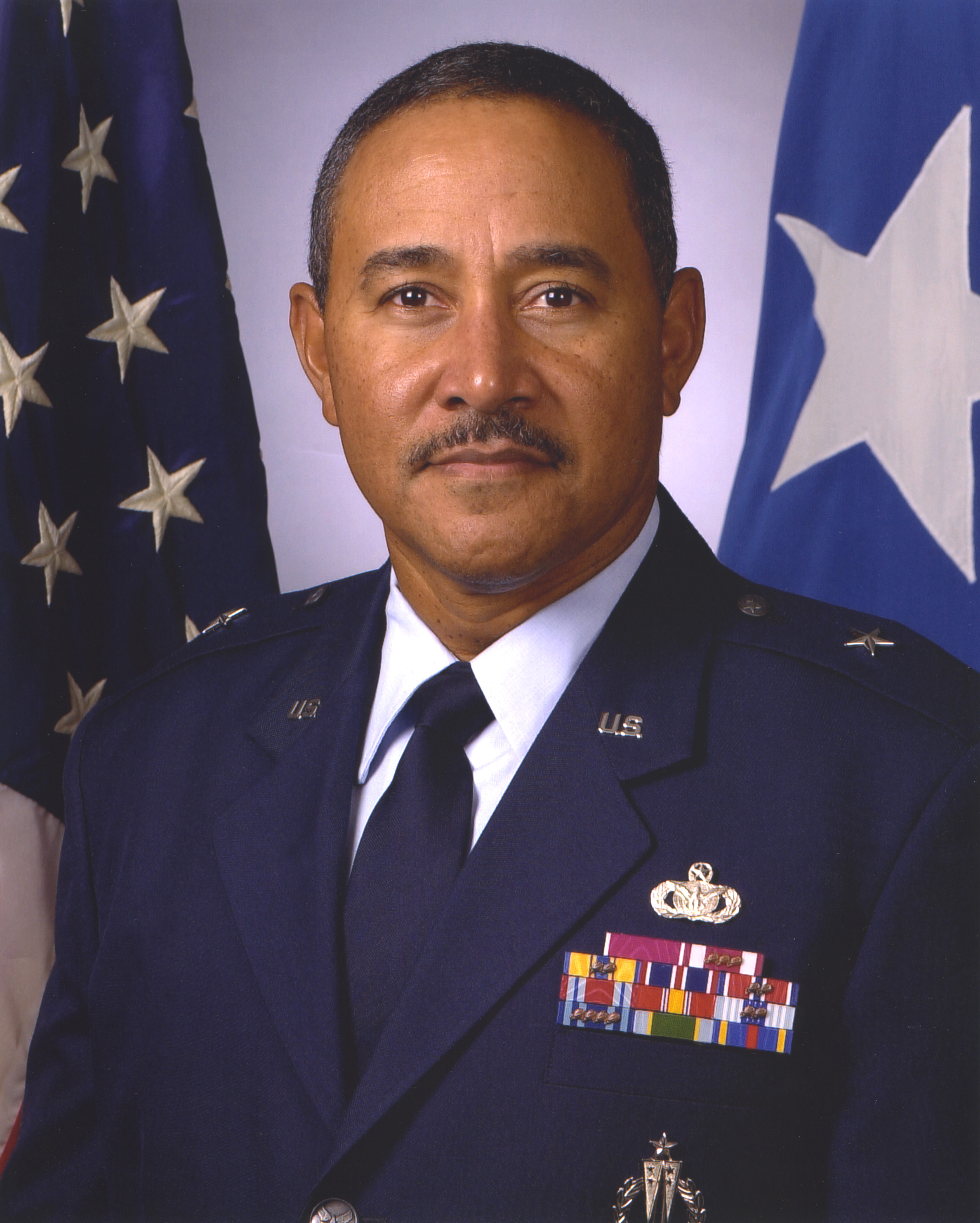
L. Eric Patterson during his time in the United States Air Force.

=== Assignments ===
- September 1975 – December 1979, missile launch officer, Little Rock AFB, Ark.
- December 1979 – October 1980, special agent, Air Force Office of Special Investigations, Langley AFB, Va.
- October 1980 – October 1982, commander, AFOSI Detachment 2101, Pope AFB, N.C.
- October 1982 – October 1983, chief of counterintelligence, collections and protective service operations, AFOSI District 69, Ankara, Turkey
- October 1983 – October 1985, chief, Counterintelligence and Protective Service Operations Policy Branch, Headquarters AFOSI, Washington, D.C.
- October 1985 – May 1989, assistant for security plans and programs, Office of the Secretary of the Air Force, Washington, D.C.
- May 1989 – May 1990, commander, Air Force Element Counterintelligence Support Activity, AFOSI, Honduras
- May 1990 – June 1992, commander, AFOSI Detachment 540, Wright-Patterson Air Force Base, Ohio
- June 1992 – June 1993, student, Air War College, Maxwell AFB, Ala.
- June 1993 – July 1994, vice commander, Air Force Investigative Operations Center, Bolling AFB, Washington, D.C.
- July 1994 – June 1996, director of security and special programs oversight, Office of the Secretary of the Air Force, Washington, D.C.
- August 1996 – July 1997, commander, 52nd Field Investigations Squadron, AFOSI, Ankara, Turkey
- July 1997 – July 1999, commander, 2nd Field Investigations Region, Langley AFB, Va.
- July 1999 – May 2001, director of operations, Headquarters AFOSI, Andrews AFB, Md.
- May 2001 – June 2005, commander, Headquarters AFOSI, Andrews AFB, Md.

=== Major awards and decorations ===
Patterson is the recipient of the following:

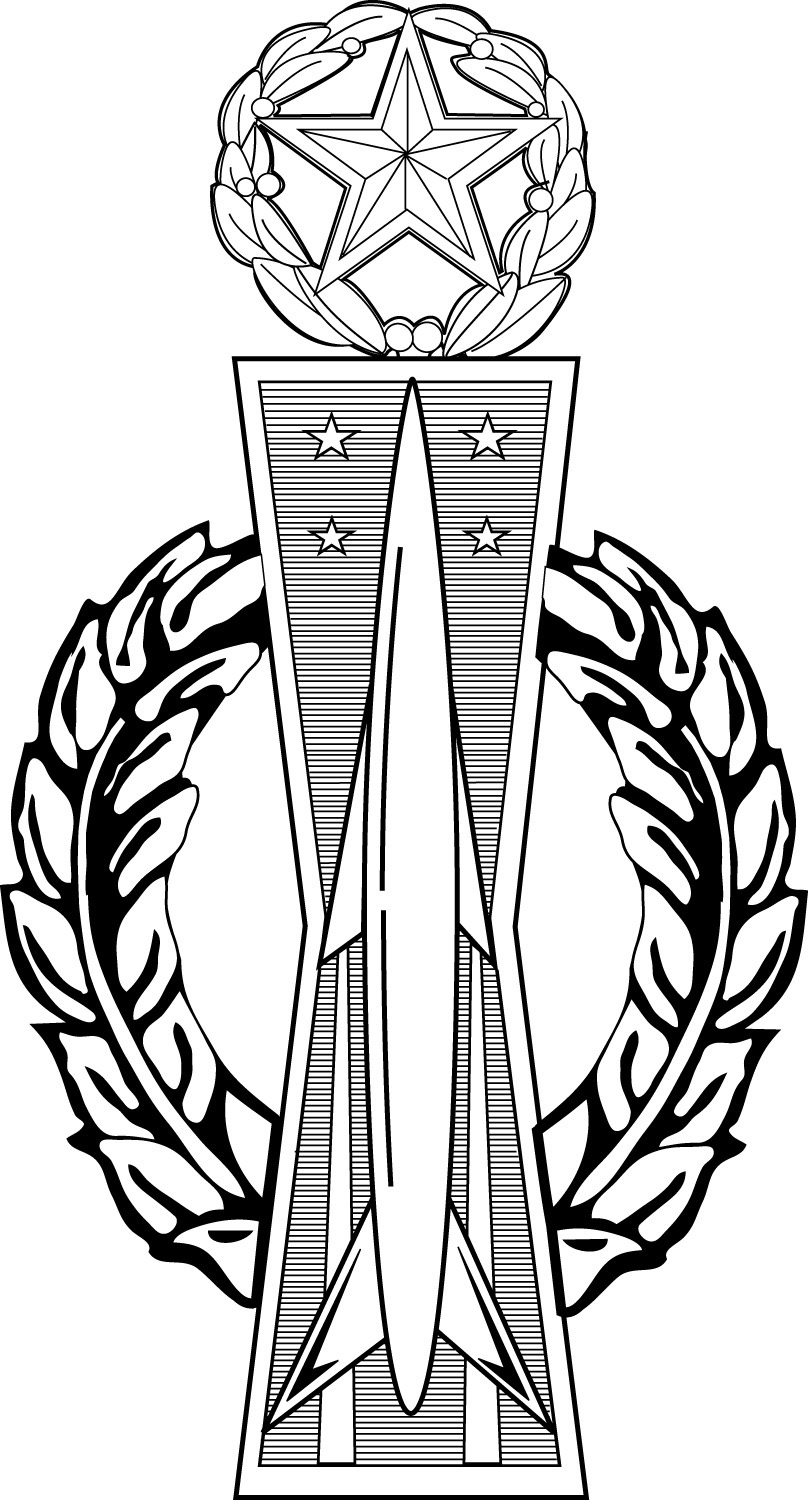

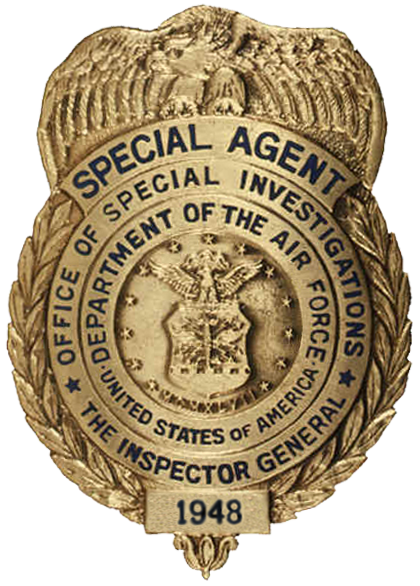

Legion of Merit with oak leaf cluster	Meritorious Service Medal with three oak leaf clusters	Air Force Commendation Medal with two oak leaf clusters

Air Force Force Protection Badge	Command Missile Operations badge	Air Force Office of Special Investigations Badge

=== Effective dates of promotion ===
Insignia	Rank	Date
	Brigadier General	July 1, 2002
	Colonel	June 1, 1996
	Lieutenant Colonel	April 1, 1990
	Major	March 1, 1986
	Captain	February 22, 1979
	First Lieutenant	February 22, 1977
	Second Lieutenant	February 22, 1975

== Post-Military Career ==
After retiring from the U.S. Air Force, Patterson served in a variety of roles, such as a principal with Booz Allen Hamilton and deputy director of the Defense Counterintelligence and HUMINT Center at the Defense Intelligence Agency (DIA), where he directed and conducted counterintelligence and human intelligence activities worldwide to meet the Department of Defense requirements. In 2010, Patterson was appointed director of the Federal Protective Service (FPS), which is a subcomponent of the National Protection and Programs Directorate (NPPD), and continues to work there serving his country.

== See also ==
- Federal Protective Service
- List of Commanders of the Air Force Office of Special Investigations

== Notes ==
Government offices
Preceded by Gary W. Schenkel	Director of the Federal Protective Service; September 2010 – Present	Succeeded by N/A
Military offices
Preceded by BG Francis X. Taylor	Commander of the Air Force Office of Special Investigations; May 2001 – June 2005	Succeeded by BG Dana A. Simmons
