= Attorney General Patterson =

Attorney General Patterson may refer to:

- John Malcolm Patterson (1921–2021), Attorney General of Alabama
- Joseph Turner Patterson (1907–1969), Attorney General of Mississippi

== See also ==
- William Paterson (judge) (1745–1806), Attorney General of New Jersey
