= Marion Rodgers =

American aviator

Marion Rodgers, Tuskegee Air Force Pilot (1921–2017)

Marion Raymond "Rodge" Rodgers USAAF (23 September 1921 – 5 December 2017) was a member of the Tuskegee Airmen, a group of African-American military pilots who fought in World War II and were the first African-American military aviators in the United States armed forces. He reached the rank of Lieutenant Colonel and served the Air Force for 22 years, commanding the renowned 99th Flying Squadron of "Red Tails" after combat, then working in management for NORAD and NASA. In his nineties, as one of the last surviving members of the Tuskegee Airmen, Rodgers continued to receive media attention as he shared his experiences and was honored at several public events.

== Early life and education ==
Rodgers was born in Detroit, Michigan, September 23, 1921. Until about the age of eight, he lived with his mother, Lola Rodgers, in Dublin, Laurens County, Georgia. His interest in aviation began when he moved with his brother to Roselle, New Jersey, and spent time watching repairmen fix a damaged biplane in a car showroom garage. When the airplane finally flew, Rodgers told an interviewer, "I was hooked."

== World War II ==
=== Flight training ===
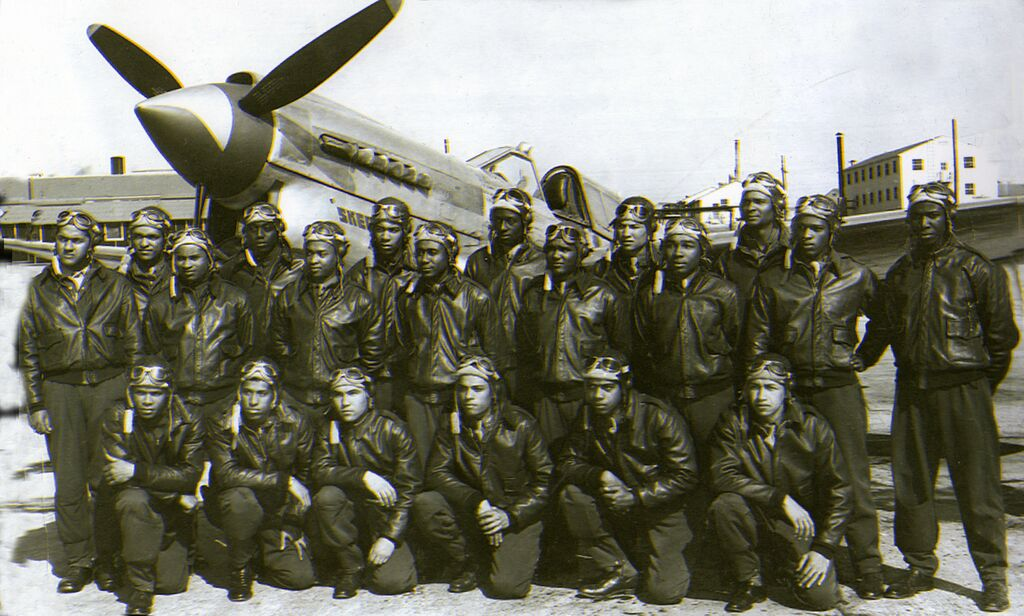
Tuskegee Squadron, Marion Rodgers third from left

When World War II broke out, a program was announced to allow African-Americans to apply for flight training. The American military at that time was still racially segregated. Rodgers, a high-school graduate, applied to the program. He was selected but could not train immediately. The Tuskegee Institute did not have the funds to support all the selectees so Rodgers was in the Army anti-aircraft artillery for about three months as a Radar Operator guiding the 90 millimeter shells to hit aerial targets. Initially he went for basic training, not to Tuskegee, but to Keesler Field, in Mississippi, along with 200 other aviation Cadet-Selectees.

Captain Marion Rodgers

His primary flight training in PT-17 Stearman Biplanes took place at Moton Field in Tuskegee, Alabama. Charles “Chief” Anderson was the instructor for all black pilots. Pilot trainees then returned to Tuskegee Army Air Field and closer military scrutiny, while they flew the Vultee BT-13A (450 horse power) for 80 hours in what was called basic training. The PT-17 had more power and was easy to land, but the new training challenged the pilots in other ways, such as acrobatics and navigation. The advanced phase for the next two months included the AT-6 (550 horse-power), which was much harder to land but easy to ground loop. Upon completion of his training in February 1944, In a biography prepared by Commemorative Air Force for its Red Tail project, he said "I made it, somehow, and was very proud. It was a segregated program. All the instructors in Basic and Advanced Training were white, but most were fair and conscientious. A few should have been somewhere else."

=== Missions flown ===
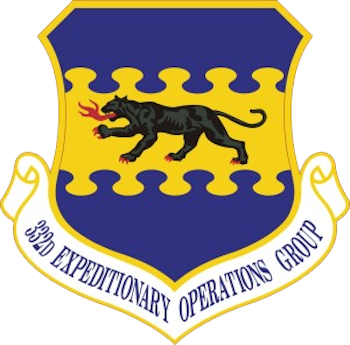
332d Expeditionary Operations Group – Emblem

During the war, Rodgers piloted 69 missions for the Army Air Force.

In an interview Rodgers described the August 12 mission in Southern France, August 12 and 14, 1944, by the 332nd Fighter Group: "My most exciting missions were strafing missions in Southern France, Rumania, Hungary, and Germany. Tuskegee Airmen destroyed aircraft, locomotives, ammo and fuel dumps, box cars, trucks, and even radar stations. Their passes approached 600 mph and they were hundreds of miles from friendly territory."

“It was my first strafing mission," he said. "We went into the target area at 15,000 feet. I was number four man in the lead flight. Our leader brought us over the target, which were radar stations near the coast." Then he rolled his plane over on its back and went down on the target in almost a vertical dive. "I had been nervous up to this time," he said, "but when I started my dive it all left me. Now my attention was centered on bringing my ship out of the dive because it had gathered tremendous speed and the ground was rushing towards me. I still hadn’t located the target. I was slightly to the right of the ship ahead of me and I saw him veer off to the right rather sharply, but I followed the other ships ahead of me while still pushing my own ship through a near split S".

“As my ship leveled out about 50 feet above the ground, I had a glimpse of something that looked very much like the picture we had seen of radar stations. I had a chance to hold my trigger down for two seconds, then zigzagged out to sea on the deck. When I returned to the base I found out that our flight of eight had lost two ships, one of them being the ship that had veered to my right. I had no vision of the flak."

On another mission on December 3, 1944, Rodgers successfully crash landed at the Ramitelli airbase in Italy.

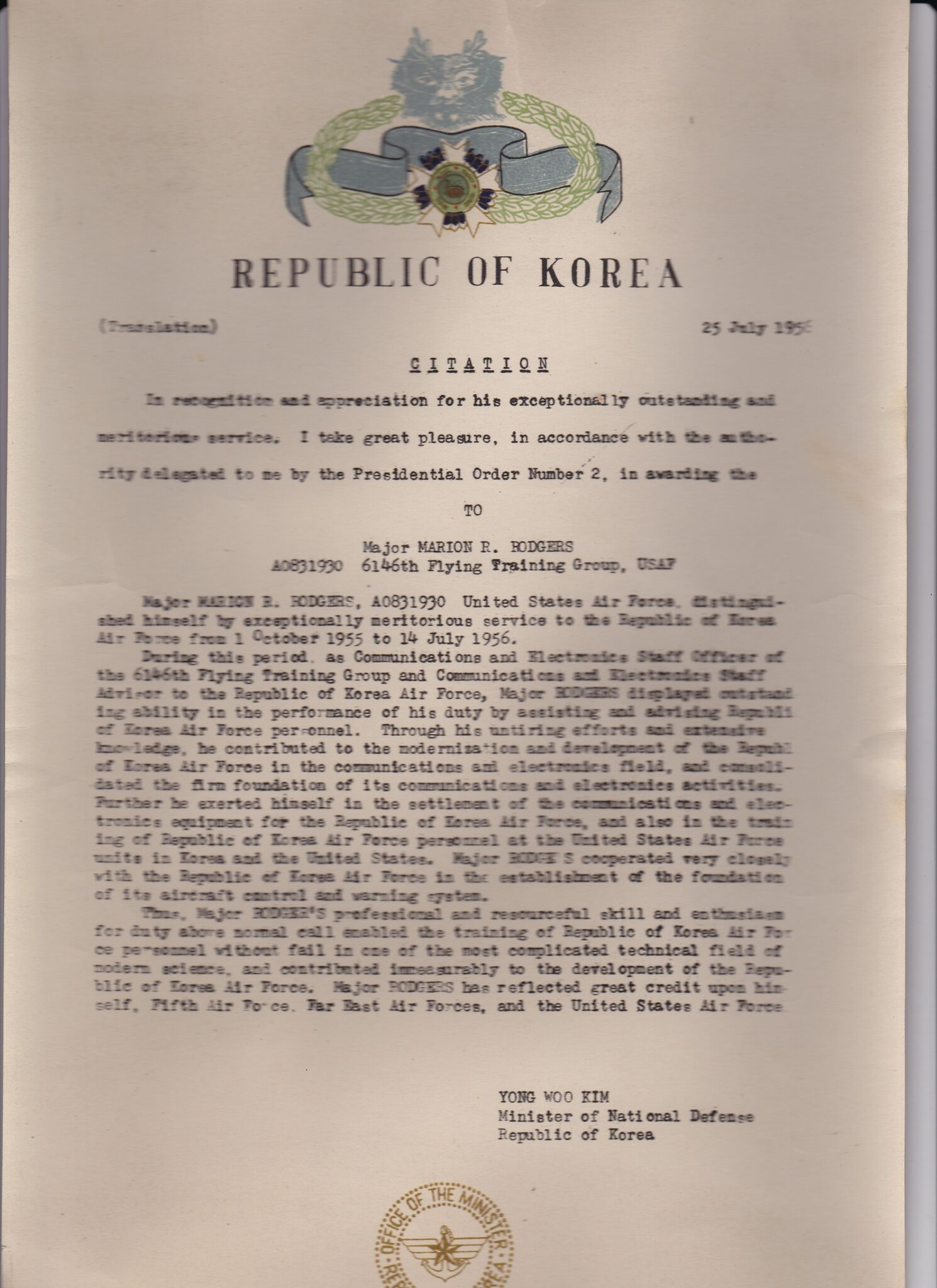
Rodgers cited for training accomplishments, 1956, South Korea.

After the Korean War, Rodgers was a B29 bomber pilot and helped in military training of South Koreans.

== Later life ==
After the war, Rodgers was the last commander of the 99th Squadron, assigned by William A. Campbell, before racial integration of the Air Force in 1948 and the squadron's deactivation. Following 22 years in the Air Force, he worked in communications for NORAD and NASA.

When the film Red Tails was released in January 2012. Rodgers participated in several events of celebration, before and after the release. In an interview with the Denver Post about the film, Rodgers noted, “Our airstrips weren’t as nice as the ones shown in the film.”

At age 93, Rodgers attracted media attention when he flew once again in a P-51, courtesy the "Wish of a Lifetime" Foundation.

Although a place was reserved for him at Arlington, Rodgers opted to be buried next to his son, Thomas Stephen Rodgers, in Colorado Springs, CO. He was born Sept. 23, 1921 and died Dec. 5, 2017. He was honored by a Tuskegee manned flyover of P-51s P-51 flyover a final farewell for a Tuskegee Airman

Honored by AARP Wish of a Lifetime:

https://wishofalifetime.org/wish/marion-rodge-flies-p-51-mustang/

Wish of a Lifetime and Brookdale were honored to be able to fulfill Rodge’s wish to fly in a P-51 Mustang. Rodge and his companion, Robert, traveled to Camarillo, CA to fulfill this wish.

== Awards and commemorations ==
For his actions during World War II, Rodgers was awarded the Distinguished Flying Cross.

In 2007, although invited and family offered support, Marion Rodgers was not present when the Tuskegee Airmen were collectively awarded a Congressional Gold Medal at a ceremony in the U.S. Capitol rotunda. (He refused to leave his wife, Suzanne T., a juvenile diabetic.)

He did receive his medal. Senator Mark Udall of Colorado congratulated Rodgers and the other eight airmen from Colorado in a speech in the Colorado House of Representatives.

Along with the other Tuskegee flyers from Colorado, Rodgers is honored at the Denver International Airport in a permanent exhibit with a poster size photo and his biography. The Georgia State Assembly has formally named the intersection of US Route 80 at US 441 Bypass in Laurens County after Tuskegee Airmen Colonel Major Herndon Cummings, Colonel John Whitehead, and Colonel Marion Rodgers. In 2014, The Non-Commissioned Officers Association gave Rodgers a World War II legacy medallion.
