= David Steeves =

United States Air Force officer

- Born: 1934; United States
- Died: October 16, 1965 (aged 30–31); United States
- Military career
- Allegiance: United States Armed Forces
- Branch: U.S. Air Force
- Rank: Lieutenant

David Steeves (1934 – October 16, 1965) was a U.S. Air Force first lieutenant and, after leaving the Air Force, worked briefly as an airline pilot before establishing a small aviation firm in Fresno, California. He is best known for an incident in 1957 when he ejected from his T-33 jet trainer over California's Kings Canyon National Park. Presumed dead by the Air Force, Steeves nevertheless wandered out of the wilderness after 54 days. He became a national hero until the news media raised doubts about his story.

Lieutenant Steeves had been ordered to fly his jet on a training flight from Hamilton Air Force Base near San Francisco, California to Craig Air Force Base near Selma, Alabama on May 9, 1957. Something went wrong with the jet and Steeves was forced to eject and parachute out, landing in Dusy Basin, Kings Canyon National Park, near the 12,000 ft. level. Badly injuring both ankles, for 15 days he crawled nearly 20 miles over impassable mountains without food in freezing weather down the Middle Fork of the Kings River. He found a ranger's cabin at Simpson Meadow that had fish hooks, beans and a canned ham. Meanwhile the military declared him dead, having been unable to find any trace of the plane or Steeves. 52 days after the accident, Steeves was found by a group of campers on horse back near Granite Basin and brought out of the mountains.

The wreckage of Steeves' jet was never found, and during elevated Cold War tensions, there was said to be speculation among uninformed observers that Steeves had sold his jet to Russia or shipped it piecemeal to Mexico. This speculation was not entertained by serious observers, however, given that Steeves' T-33 was a low-tech training jet that the Russians would not have wanted. Even so, the Air Force's accident report mentioned, as one of three probable causes for the jet crash, that Steeves had carried out a hoax; however, the accident report did not offer any explanation as to what the hoax might have involved. Even though no charges were brought against Steeves, he requested discharge from the Air Force, which was granted.

Steeves moved to Fresno, west of where he ejected, and established an aviation firm that flew skydivers and modified light airplanes. In the following years, he took hiking trips to Kings Canyon and flew over the area in a search for the wreckage of his jet. In October 1965, Steeves was killed at the Boise, Idaho airport in the crash of a Stinson airplane that he had modified.

In the summer of 1977 some Boy Scouts from Los Angeles on a hiking trip in Dusy Basin in Kings Canyon National Park came across an aircraft canopy. In October the following year it was announced the serial number on it matched the missing T-33A jet that Steeves had piloted.

As of June, 2014, no more wreckage has been found.

== Bibliography ==
- Stekel, Peter (2010). Final Flight: The Mystery of a WW II Plane Crash and the Frozen Airmen in the High Sierra. Wilderness Press. p. 256. ISBN 9780899976662.
