= 18th Cavalry Regiment (United States) =

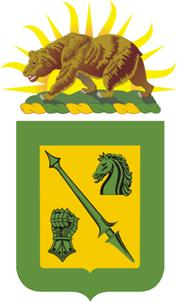
- Coat of arms
- Active: 1885–1963 (earlier designations); 1963-present (18th Cavalry)
- Country: United States of America
- Branch: United States Army
- Type: Cavalry
- Role: RSTA
- Size: Squadron
- Garrison/HQ: Azusa, California (HHT)
- Mottos: Velox et Mortifer (Swift and Deadly)
- Engagements: World War I World War II: Bismarck Archipelago; Philippines Campaign; Korean War Global War on Terrorism
- Decorations: Philippine Presidential Unit Citation; Republic of Korea Presidential Unit Citation; Meritorious Unit Commendation

Insignia
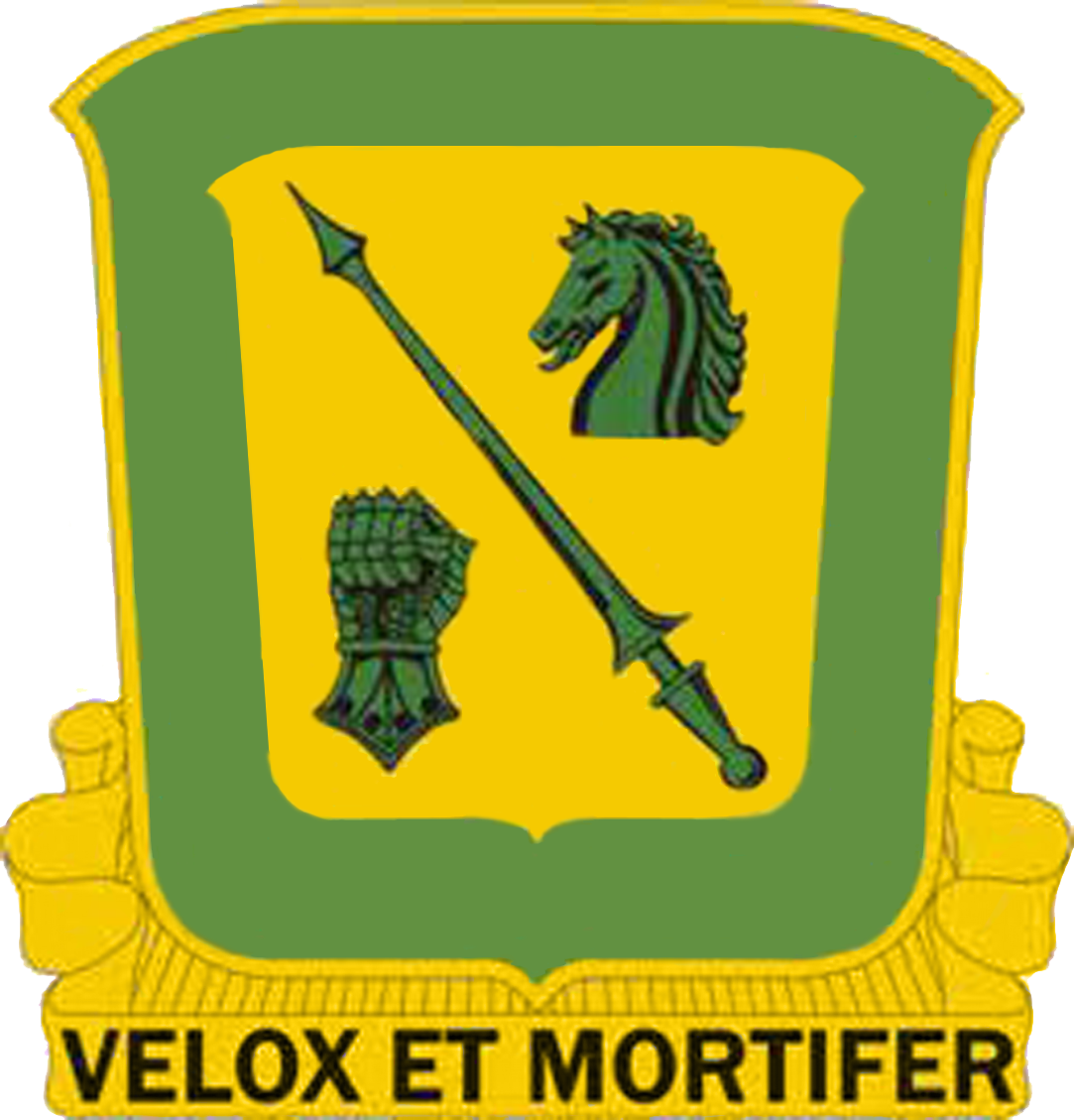
- Regimental distinctive insignia

The 18th Cavalry Regiment is a United States Army Regimental System parent regiment of the Armor Branch of the United States Army.

The 1st Squadron, 18th Cavalry Regiment, is the reconnaissance element of the 79th Infantry Brigade Combat Team of the California Army National Guard.

== History ==
The 1st Squadron, 18th Cavalry Regiment, was originally constituted on 22 July 1885 in the California National Guard as the 7th Infantry Battalion and organized from existing companies in southern California. It expanded, reorganized, and was redesignated on 5 May 1888 as the 7th Infantry Regiment. On 7 December 1895, it was consolidated with the 9th Infantry Regiment, which had been organized on 8 February 1890, retaining the 7th Infantry Regiment designation.

During the Spanish–American War, the regiment was mustered into Federal service on 9 May 1898 at the Presidio of San Francisco as the 7th California Volunteer Infantry. It did not see overseas service before being mustered out at Los Angeles on 2 December after the end of the war. It mustered into federal service on 29 June 1916 at Sacramento; and mustered out of federal service on 11 November 1916 at Los Angeles. It was drafted into federal service on 5 August 1917.

Between 25 September and 1 November, the regiment consolidated with the California National Guard 2nd Infantry Regiment's 2nd Battalion, Companies L and M, and Sanitary Detachment as the 160th Infantry. The 160th was assigned to the 40th Infantry Division, and was demobilized at Camp Kearny in San Diego on 7 May 1919.

Former southern California elements reorganized on 23 August-6 October 1921 in the California National Guard as the 160th Infantry and was assigned to the 40th Division; Headquarters was federally recognized on 31 January 1922 at Los Angeles.

The 2nd Battalion 160th Infantry, reorganized and was redesignated on 1 April 1929 as the 2nd Battalion, 185th Infantry, an element of the 40th Division (160th Infantry — hereafter separate lineage). It expanded, reorganized, and was redesignated in March–April 1930 as the 2nd and 3rd Battalions, 185th Infantry, elements of the 40th Division (later designated as the 40th Infantry Division). It was inducted into federal service on 3 March 1941 at home stations. It inactivated on 7 April 1946 at Camp Stoneman, CA.

The 2nd Battalion, 185th Infantry, was redesignated on 5 August 1946 as the 2nd Battalion, 223rd Infantry and remained assigned to the 40th Infantry Division. At the same time, the 3rd Battalion, 185th Infantry, was redesignated as the 224th Infantry. The 2nd Battalion of the 223rd was organized and Federally recognized on 23 June 1947 with headquarters at Burbank. On 1 September 1950, during the Korean War, the battalion was ordered into active Federal service at Burbank. The 2nd Battalion fought in the Korean War from the winter of 1951–1952 to the end of the war in July 1953. On 2 September 1952, a 2nd Battalion, 223rd Infantry was organized and Federally recognized in the National Guard of the United States (NGUS) to replace the deployed battalion at Burbank. The battalion was released from active service on 30 June 1954 after returning to California and reverted to state control as Federal recognition was withdrawn from the NGUS unit.

The 2nd Battalion, 223rd Infantry, consolidated with the 3rd Battalion, 111th Armored Cavalry as the 139th Tank Battalion (90mm gun) on 1 July. It was organized and federally recognized on 26 January 1951 with headquarters at Van Nuys and moved to Burbank on 1 November of that year. The new unit was assigned to the 40th Armored Division. On 1 July 1959, the battalion was reorganized and redesignated as the 2nd Medium Tank Battalion of the 185th Armor, still part of the 40th Armored Division.

The unit reorganized and was redesignated on 1 March 1963 as the 1st Reconnaissance Squadron, 18th Armored Cavalry, and relieved from assignment to the 40th Armored Division. It was reorganized and redesignated on 1 November 1965 as the 1st Squadron, 18th Armored Cavalry; and ordered into active federal service on 13 May 1968 at home stations. The 1st Squadron was scheduled for deployment to South Vietnam in November 1968 but due to pressure from the relatives of unit members, only the squadron's heavy equipment was shipped to South Vietnam and the unit was assigned to the Strategic Army Forces in the United States. On 12 December 1969 it was released from active federal service and reverting to state control. On 13 December, its headquarters was moved to Ontario.

It was reorganized and redesignated on 13 January 1974 as the 18th Cavalry, a parent regiment under the Combat Arms Regimental System, to consist of the 1st Squadron, an element of the 40th Infantry Division. It was withdrawn on 19 January 1988 from the Combat Arms Regimental System and reorganized under the United States Army Regimental System.

The 1st Squadron [less Troops C and D] was ordered into active federal service on 1 May 1992 at home station and deployed to the LA Riots. 1st/18th was first unit on the ground to secure the LA Coliseum, (on the ground for two weeks) released on 9 May 1992 and reverted to state control.

=== Twenty-first century ===
In the 2003-2004 time period Alpha, Bravo and Charlie Troops were activated in support of Operation Noble Eagle. In 2005–2006, the Squadron (less Delta, Echo and Foxtrot Troops) were mobilized to provide a security force for Camp Delta which fell under the GWOT Campaign. A few of the troopers were assigned to the 184th Infantry during their 2004 deployment to Operation Iraqi Freedom, with some dying in combat. During the October 2007 California wildfires, approximately 400 soldiers were activated by the Governor of California to assist local authorities in various functions. 1-18th Cavalry was called to active federal service along with the 79th IBCT in October 2008 in support of NATO peacekeeping efforts in Kosovo. 1-18th Cavalry subsequently returned to the U.S. in November 2009. During the 2015 California wildfires, Soldiers with 18th Cavalry were called up to participate in firefighting operations.

In 2018, elements of the regiment deployed to Jordan, as part of Task Force Spartan, relieving elements of the 184th Infantry.

In 2020, soldiers of the 1-18CAV were activated to Los Angeles to support local civil authorities during the George Floyd protests.

On July 7, 2025, soldiers of the 1-18CAV marched on MacArthur Park, a Los Angeles municipal park. There were no protests or violence at the park at the time, which was populated at the time by American civilians (including parents and children at the playground). The statement to the press called the action (Operation Excalibur) a "show of presence." ("On order, 1-18th Cavalry Squadron provides static interagency site protection, mounted mobile security, and Joint Force Land Component Command (JFLCC) Reserve support to Customs and Border Patrol (CBP) and supporting federal agencies, whose intent at MacArthur Park is to demonstrate, through a show of presence, the capacity and freedom of maneuver of federal law enforcement within the Los Angeles Joint Operations Area (JOA)."

== Distinctive unit insignia ==
- Description

A Gold color metal and enamel device 1 1/8 inches (2.9 cm) in height overall consisting of a shield blazoned: Or, a tilting spear in bend Vert, between a horse's head couped and a gauntlet of the like, all within a bordure of the second. Attached below the shield is a Gold scroll inscribed "VELOX ET MORTIFER" in Black letters.

- Symbolism

The shield of the coat of arms for the 111th Armored Cavalry Regiment, differenced by a green border, indicates descent of the 139th Tank Battalion from the 3d Battalion of that organization. The colors yellow and green are used for Armor. The horse's head and lance symbolize Cavalry and medieval armor, respectively. The gauntlet represents the shock action of armor and the ability to deliver a decisive blow.

- Background

The distinctive unit insignia was originally approved for the 139th Tank Battalion on 28 February 1956. It was redesignated for the 18th Armored Cavalry Regiment on 24 April 1968. The insignia was redesignated for the 18th Cavalry Regiment on 13 May 1975.

== Coat of arms ==
=== Blazon ===
- Crest

Or, a tilting spear in bend Vert, between a horse's head couped and a gauntlet of the like, all within a bordure of the second.

- Shield

That for the regiments and separate battalions of the California Army National Guard: On a wreath of the colors Or and Vert, the setting sun behind a grizzly bear passant on a grassy field all Proper. Motto VELOX ET MORTIFER (Swift and Deadly).

=== Symbolism ===
- Shield

The shield of the coat of arms for the 111th Armored Cavalry Regiment, differenced by a green border, indicates descent of the 139th Tank Battalion from the 3d Battalion of that organization. The colors yellow and green are used for Armor. The horse's head and lance symbolize Cavalry and medieval armor, respectively. The gauntlet represents the shock action of armor and the ability to deliver a decisive blow.

- Crest

The crest is that of the California Army National Guard.

=== Background ===
The coat of arms was originally approved for the 139th Tank Battalion on 28 February 1956. It was redesignated for the 18th Armored Cavalry Regiment on 24 April 1968. The insignia was redesignated for the 18th Cavalry Regiment on 13 May 1975.
