= 40th Infantry Division (United States) =

US Army National Guard formation

- 40th Infantry Division's combat service identification badge
- Active: 18 July 1917–20 April 1919; 18 June 1926–7 April 1946; 1 September 1950–1 July 1954; 1 July 1954–29 January 1968 (40th Armored Bge.); 29 January 1968–present
- Country: United States
- Allegiance: California
- Branch: United States Army
- Type: Mechanized Infantry
- Size: Division
- Part of: United States Army National Guard
- Garrison/HQ: Los Alamitos Joint Forces Training Base, California
- Nickname: "Sunburst Division" (special designation)
- Mottos: Duty, Honor, Courage
- Engagements: World War I; World War II; Bismarck Archipelago; Luzon; Southern Philippines; Korean War; Second Phase Offensive; Third Battle of Seoul; Kosovo Force; War on terror; Afghanistan; Iraq; Operation Spartan Shield; Operation Inherent Resolve
- Decorations: Philippine Republic Presidential Unit Citation (1)

Commanders
- Current commander: MG William J. Prendergast IV
- Div CSM: CSM Refugio Rosas Jr.

Insignia
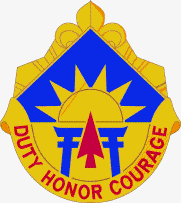
- Distinctive unit insignia

- Flag

The 40th Infantry Division ("Sunburst Division") is a modular division of the California Army National Guard. Following the Army's modularization in the mid-2000s, the division has become a modular unit consisting of three brigade combat teams, with National Guardsmen from throughout the Pacific and Western United States and Oceania. Its division headquarters is located at Los Alamitos Joint Forces Training Base in Los Alamitos, California.

After seeing service in World War I as a depot division, it was reorganized as the National Guard division for California, Nevada, and Utah, before seeing service in the Pacific Theatre of World War II. Later, the division served in Korea and some of its units were designated for Vietnam. The division was later reorganized redesigned as a National Guard unit completely within California. Later reorganizations included units from other states. The division was called up to quell civil disturbances and rioting that occurred during the Watts Riots in 1965, rioting during the Long, Hot Summer of 1967 and during the LA riots in 1992. Most recently, the division has been deployed overseas as part of the ongoing Global War on Terrorism, seeing service in Iraq and Afghanistan. As currently configured, the 40th Infantry Division has oversight and responsibility for the training and readiness of units in California, Oregon, Hawaii, Arizona, Washington, Alaska, New Mexico, Indiana, Nebraska, Nevada, Utah, Guam, and the Northern Mariana Islands.

== History ==
Constituted on 18 July 1917 following the American entry into World War I, the 40th Infantry Division was organized at Camp Kearny, near San Diego, California, on 16 September, originally designated as the 19th Division. It was composed of National Guard units from the states of Arizona, California, Colorado, Nevada, New Mexico, and Utah.

=== World War I ===
It was sent overseas on 3 August 1918 and redesignated as the 6th Depot Division; received, equipped, trained, and forwarded replacements. Major General Frederick S. Strong was assigned as commander on 25 August 1917, but was replaced less than a month later by Brigadier General G. H. Cameron on 18 September 1917.

The division then saw a rapid turnover of leaders – Brigadier General L. S. Lyon (19 November 1917), Brigadier General G. H. Cameron (23 November 1917), Brigadier General L. S. Lyon (6 December 1917) and then Major General F. S. Strong again on 8 December 1917.

==== Order of battle ====
- Headquarters, 40th Division
- 79th Infantry Brigade
  - 157th Infantry Regiment (former 1st Colorado Infantry, and 1st Colorado Cavalry less band and Troop E)
  - 158th Infantry Regiment (former 1st Arizona Infantry)
  - 144th Machine Gun Battalion (former 3rd Battalion and Machine Gun Company, 1st New Mexico Infantry)
- 80th Infantry Brigade
  - 159th Infantry Regiment (former 5th California Infantry, and 2nd California Infantry less band, 2nd Battalion, and Companies L and M)
  - 160th Infantry Regiment (former 7th California Infantry, and 2nd Battalion and Companies L and M, 2nd California Infantry)
  - 145th Machine Gun Battalion (former Troops A, B, and C and Machine Gun Troop, 1st Separate Squadron California Cavalry)
- 65th Field Artillery Brigade
  - 143rd Field Artillery Regiment (75 mm) (former 1st California Field Artillery)
  - 144th Field Artillery Regiment (155 mm) (former 2nd California Field Artillery)
  - 145th Field Artillery Regiment (4.7") (former 1st Utah Field Artillery)
  - 115th Trench Mortar Battery (former Machine Gun Company, 2nd Colorado Infantry)
- 143rd Machine Gun Battalion (former 1st and 2nd Battalions, 1st New Mexico Infantry)
- 115th Engineer Regiment (former 1st Battalion, Colorado Engineers, and Troop E, 1st Colorado Cavalry)
- 115th Field Signal Battalion (former Company B, California Signal Corps and Company B, Colorado Signal Corps)
- Headquarters Troop, 40th Division (former Troop D, 1st California Cavalry)
- 115th Train Headquarters and Military Police (former Headquarters, Headquarters Company less band, and Supply Company, 1st New Mexico Infantry)
  - 115th Ammunition Train (former Headquarters, Headquarters Company less band, and 2nd and 3rd Battalions, 1st Colorado Infantry)
  - 115th Supply Train (former Supply Company and 1st Battalion, 1st Colorado Infantry)
  - 115th Engineer Train (former 1st Colorado Engineer Train)
  - 115th Sanitary Train
    - 157th, 158th, 159th, and 160th Ambulance Companies and Field Hospitals (former California Ambulance Companies No. 1 and 2 and Field Hospital Companies No. 1 and 2, and Utah Field Hospital No. 1)

When the division arrived in France in August 1918, the Imperial German Army had just completed a series of offensives that started on 21 March and ended on 15 July 1918. It was decided that the new divisions would be used as depot divisions, supplying fresh troops to the more experienced combat divisions. By the time the war was over in November 1918, due to the Armistice with Germany, the 40th Division had provided over 27,000 replacements to the 26th, 28th, 32nd, 77th, 80th, 81st, 82nd, and 89th Divisions. Thus the division as a whole did not serve in combat, but many division personnel fought, notably Captain Nelson Miles Holderman, who received the Medal of Honor for his actions in the Meuse–Argonne offensive while serving with the Lost Battalion of the 77th Division. The division returned to the United States on 30 June 1919 where it was deactivated.

=== World War I Memorial ===
In Sacramento, the entrance to the Library & Courts Building (home to the California State Library houses the Memorial Entrance Vestibule, a memorial for the California veterans who served in World War I. In addition to the use of the 40th Infantry Division's sunburst insignia (symbolizing the division's connection to California) both inside and outside the building, the two major features are the sixteen black Italian marble pillars and a large mural titled "War Through the Ages" by painter Frank Van Sloan. The memorial opened to the public in 1928.

=== Interwar period ===
The 40th Division headquarters arrived at the port of New York aboard the USS Artemis on 13 March 1919 after 6 months of overseas service and was demobilized on 20 April 1919 at Camp Kearny, California. In accordance with the National Defense Act of 1920, the division was allotted to the states of California, Utah, and Nevada, and assigned to the IX Corps. The division headquarters was reorganized and federally recognized on 18 June 1926 at Berkeley, California. The division headquarters was relocated on 1 October 1937 to Los Angeles, California. The designated mobilization training center for the “Sunburst” Division was Camp San Luis Obispo, where much of the division’s training activities occurred between the wars. The units of the 40th Division were called up by their state governors for various state emergencies and duties. The largest of these was a virtually statewide strike in California in May and June 1934 by longshoremen and other labor unions. Most of the division was called up to perform strike duty and crowd control. The division staff, composed of personnel from all three states, came together to conduct joint training for several summers before World War II. The staff conducted their training at numerous locations over the period to include the Presidio of San Francisco, Camp San Luis Obispo, and at the Presidio of Monterey.

The division conducted summer camp every year at San Luis Obispo, 1923-1939, minus the Utah elements, which held their training at Camp W.G. Williams, Utah. Additionally, the division staff participated in the Fourth Army CPXs held at Fort Lewis, Washington, in 1935 and 1936, and at the Presidio of San Francisco in 1939. For the 1937 camp, the division participated in the Ninth Corps Area phase of the Fourth Army maneuvers at San Luis Obispo held 2–12 August. During that maneuver, the 40th Division operated against the 6th Infantry Brigade of the Regular Army's 3rd Division. In April 1940, the 40th Division commanding general and his staff participated in the 3rd Division’s maneuver in the vicinity of Fort Ord, California. For the final phase of the exercise, the division commander and staff assumed control of the simulated combat actions of the 3rd Division. In August 1940, the “Sunburst” Division again participated in the Fourth Army Maneuvers, this time at Fort Lewis as part of the provisional IX Corps. The division was relieved from the IX Corps on 30 December 1940 and assigned to the III Corps. In early 1941, the personnel from Nevada’s 40th Military Police Company and 2nd Battalion, 115th Engineer Regiment were used to form the 121st Coast Artillery Battalion (Separate) (Antiaircraft), and the military police and engineer units were subsequently reorganized in California, removing Nevada from allocation to the division.

=== World War II ===
==== WWII division organization ====
===== Square division =====
On 3 March 1941, the 40th Division was inducted into federal service at home stations and then assembled at Fort Lewis in Washington. At the time the division still retained its World War I square organization and consisted of the following units.

40th Division square organization (click to enlarge)

- 40th Division, in Los Angeles (CA)
  - 40th Division Headquarters
  - 79th Infantry Brigade, in Sacramento, California (CA)
    - Headquarters and Headquarters Company, in Sacramento (CA)
    - 159th Infantry Regiment, in Oakland (CA)
      - Headquarters and Headquarters Company
      - 3× Infantry battalions
        - each battalion consists of: 1× Headquarters and Headquarters Detachment, 3× Rifle companies, 1× Weapons Company
      - Anti-Tank Company (M3 37mm Anti-Tank guns)
      - Service Company
    - 184th Infantry Regiment, in Sacramento (CA)
      - same organization as 159th Infantry Regiment
  - 80th Infantry Brigade, in Los Angeles (CA)
    - Headquarters and Headquarters Company, in Los Angeles (CA)
    - 160th Infantry Regiment, in Los Angeles (CA)
      - same organization as 159th Infantry Regiment
    - 185th Infantry Regiment, in Fresno (CA)
      - same organization as 159th Infantry Regiment
  - 65th Field Artillery Brigade, in Salt Lake City (UT)
    - Headquarters and Headquarters Battery, in Payson (UT)
    - 143rd Field Artillery Regiment, in Stockton (CA)
      - Headquarters and Headquarters Battery
      - 2× Light Field Artillery battalions
        - Headquarters and Headquarters Battery
        - 3× Howitzer batteries (M1897 75mm field guns), replaced by M2 105mm towed howitzers in 1941)
        - Service Battery
    - 145th Field Artillery Regiment, in Salt Lake City (UT)
      - same organization as 143rd Field Artillery Regiment
    - 222nd Field Artillery Regiment, in Salt Lake City (UT)
      - Headquarters and Headquarters Battery
      - 2× Medium Field Artillery battalions
        - Headquarters and Headquarters Battery
        - 3× Howitzer batteries (M1918 155mm towed howitzers, replaced by M1 155mm towed howitzers in 1941)
        - Anti-Tank Battery (M1897 75mm anti-tank guns)
        - Service Battery
  - 115th Engineer Regiment, in Salt Lake City (UT)
    - Headquarters and Headquarters and Service Company
    - 2× Engineer battalions
      - each battalion consists of: 1× Headquarters, 3× Engineer companies
  - 115th Medical Regiment, in Los Angeles (CA)
    - Headquarters and Headquarters and Service Company
    - Collecting Battalion
      - battalion consists of: 1× Headquarters, 3× Collecting companies
    - Ambulance Battalion
      - battalion consists of: 1× Headquarters, 3× Ambulance companies
    - Clearing Battalion
      - battalion consists of: 1× Headquarters, 3× Clearing companies
  - 115th Quartermaster Regiment, in Berkeley (CA)
    - Headquarters and Headquarters Company
    - 2× Truck battalions
      - each battalion consists of: 1× Headquarters, 2× Truck companies
    - Light Maintenance and Car Battalion
      - battalion consists of: 1× Headquarters, 1× Light Maintenance Company, 1× Car Company
    - Service Company
  - Headquarters, Special Troops, in Berkeley (CA)
    - Headquarters Company, 40th Division, in Los Angeles (CA)
    - 40th Signal Company, in San Francisco (CA)
    - 115th Ordnance Company, in Ogden (UT)
    - 40th Military Police Company, in California

===== Triangular division =====
On 18 February 1942, as a part of an Army-wide reorganization of National Guard divisions, the 40th Division was reorganized as a triangular division. The division's two brigade headquarters were disbanded in favor of a structure containing three separate regimental commands reporting directly to the division headquarters, as well as four field artillery battalions under a division artillery headquarters, with the engineer, medical, and quartermaster regiments also reduced to battalions. The 159th Infantry Regiment had already been relieved from assignment to the division and assigned to 7th Infantry Division on 29 September 1941. With the reorganization the division was renamed 40th Infantry Division. Afterwards the 40th Infantry Division was composed of the following units:

40th Infantry Division triangular organization (click to enlarge)

- 40th Infantry Division
  - 40th Infantry Division Headquarters
  - 40th Cavalry Reconnaissance Troop (Mechanized) (M3 scout cars and then M8 Greyhound armored cars)
  - 108th Infantry Regiment (assigned to division on 1 September 1942)
    - Headquarters and Headquarters Company
    - 3× Infantry battalions
      - each battalion consists of: 1× Headquarters and Headquarters Company, 3× Rifle companies, 1× Heavy Weapons Company
    - Cannon Company (T12 Gun Motor Carriages and T19 Howitzer Motor Carriages, later replaced by either M3 105mm towed howitzers or M7 Priest self propelled howitzers)
    - Anti-Tank Company (M3 37mm anti-tank guns, which were replaced by 1944 with M1 57mm anti-tank guns)
    - Service Company
  - 160th Infantry Regiment (detached from division from 1 September 1942 to 25 December 1943)
    - same organization as 108th Infantry Regiment
  - 184th Infantry Regiment (relieved from assignment to the division on 16 June 1942)
    - same organization as 108th Infantry Regiment
  - 185th Infantry Regiment
    - same organization as 108th Infantry Regiment
  - 40th Infantry Division Artillery
    - Headquarters and Headquarters Battery
    - 143rd Field Artillery Battalion
      - Headquarters and Headquarters Battery
      - 3× Batteries (M2 105mm towed howitzers)
      - Service Battery
    - 164th Field Artillery Battalion
      - same organization as 143rd Field Artillery Battalion
    - 213th Field Artillery Battalion
      - same organization as 143rd Field Artillery Battalion
    - 222nd Field Artillery Battalion
      - Headquarters and Headquarters Battery
      - 3× Batteries (M1 155mm towed howitzers)
      - Service Battery
  - Headquarters Special Troops
    - Headquarters Company, 40th Infantry Division
    - 40th Signal Company
    - 40th Quartermaster Company
    - 740th Ordnance Light Maintenance Company
    - 115th Military Police Platoon
    - 40th Infantry Division Band (attached)
  - 40th Quartermaster Battalion (Between September and November 1942 Quartermaster battalions were disbanded and their platoons used to form a Quartermaster Company and an Ordnance Company, which were both assigned to Headquarters Special Troops)
    - Headquarters and Headquarters Company (includes a service platoon and a maintenance platoon)
    - Truck Company
  - 115th Engineer Combat Battalion
    - Headquarters and Headquarters and Service Company
    - 3× Engineer combat companies
  - 115th Medical Battalion
    - Headquarters and Headquarters Detachment
    - 3× Collecting companies
    - Clearing Company

==== Combat chronicle ====
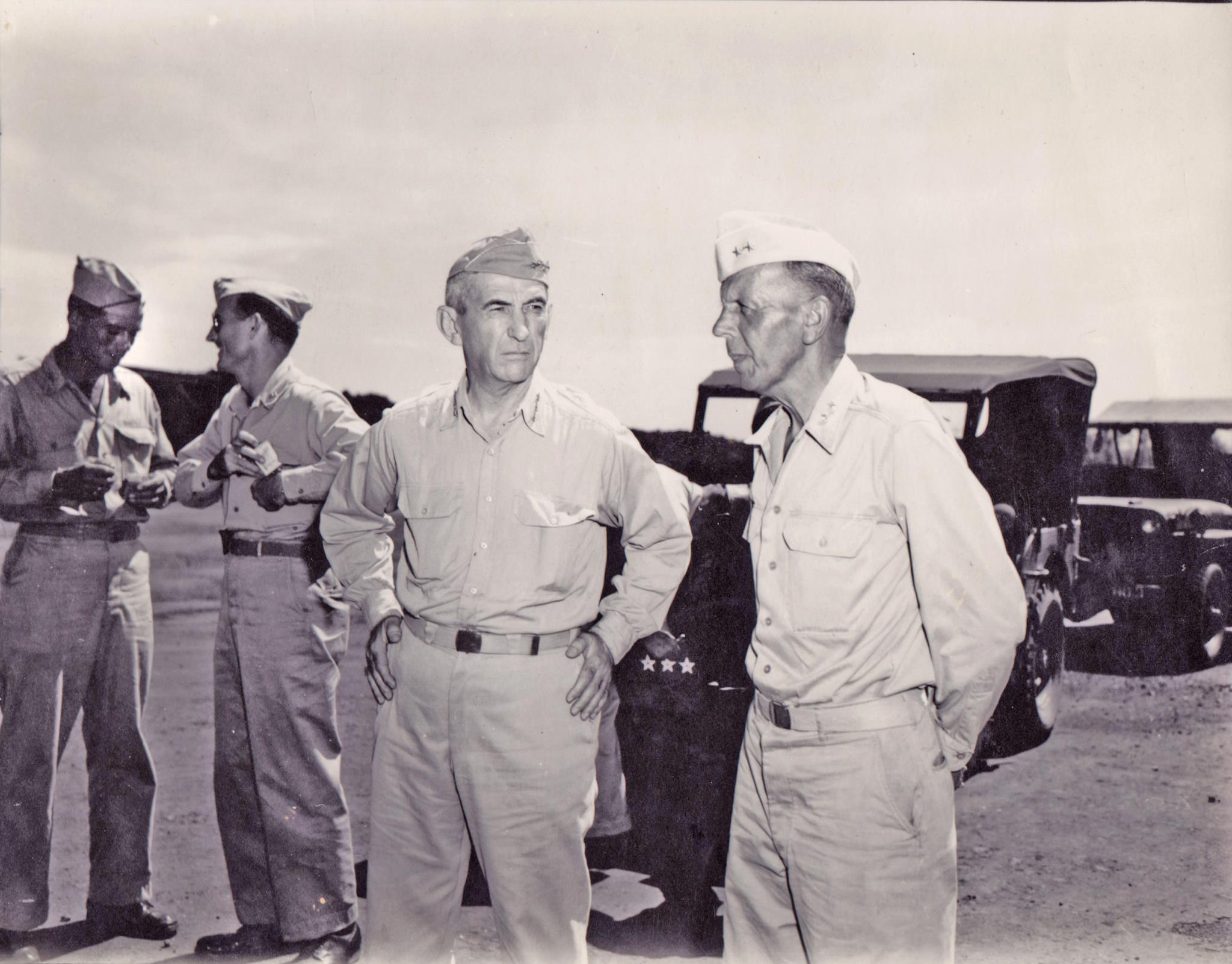
Division's commander, Major general Rapp Brush (right) with Commander, Sixth Army, lieutenant general Walter Krueger at the airport in the Philippines in early 1945.

The division departed for overseas service on 23 August 1942. The division's first overseas assignment was the defense of the outer Hawaiian Islands, where it arrived in September 1942. Training continued as defensive positions were improved and maintained. In July 1943, the division was concentrated on Oahu, and relieved the 24th Infantry Division of the defense of the North Sector. Relieved of the North Sector in October 1943, the 40th entered upon a period of intensive amphibious and jungle training. On 20 December 1943, the first units left for Guadalcanal, and by mid-January 1944, movement was completed, and the division prepared for its first combat assignment. On 24 April 1944, it left Guadalcanal for New Britain. The regiments of the division took positions at Talasea on the northern side of the island, at Arawe on the southern side, and at near the western end. Neutralization of the enemy was effected by patrols. No major battle was fought. Heavy rain and mud were constant problems.

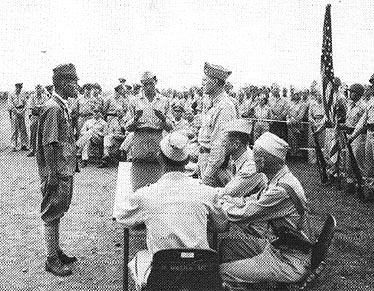
Japanese soldier surrenders in the Philippines.

The 40th was relieved of missions on New Britain on 27 November 1944 by the Australian 5th Division, and began training for the Luzon landing. Sailing from Borgen Bay on 9 December 1944, the division made an assault landing at Lingayen, Luzon, under command of XIV Corps, on 9 January 1945. Seizing Lingayen airfield, the division occupied Bolinao Peninsula and San Miguel, and advanced toward Manila, include the Filipino regular and constable force of the Philippine Commonwealth Army and Philippine Constabulary were recaptured areas around in Luzon at the mainland, running into heavy fighting in the Fort Stotsenburg area and the Bambam Hills. Snake Hill and Storm King Mountain were taken in February and the 40th was relieved, 2 March. Leaving Luzon on 15 March 1945 to cut behind the Japanese, the division landed on Panay Island on the 18th and knocked out Japanese resistance within ten days, seizing airfields at Cabatuan and Mandurriao. On 29 March, it landed at Pulupandan, Negros Occidental, advanced through Bacolod toward Talisay, which it secured by 2 April 1945. After mopping up on Negros Island, the division returned to Panay in June and July 1945.

Lt. Col. Ryoichi Tozuka, the commander of the Imperial Japanese Army in Panay Island, signed the document of surrender at Cabatuan Airfield, located in Cabatuan, Iloilo, Panay Island, Philippines, on September 2, 1945, the same day as the surrender signing in Japan aboard the U.S.S. Missouri. This was accepted by Col. Raymond G. Stanton, commanding the 160th U.S. Infantry regiment, and was attended by Rear Admiral Ralph O. Davis, commanding the U.S. Navy's 13th Amphibious Group, and by Brig. Gen. Donald J. Myers, commanding the 40th Infantry Division. The 13th Amphibious Group was tasked to transport the 40th U.S. Infantry Division to Korea.

In September 1945, the division moved to Korea for occupation duty. The division returned to the U.S. on 7 August 1946 and was inactivated the same day.

World War II honors for the division included three Distinguished Unit Citations. Awards to its men included 1 Medal of Honor, 12 Distinguished Service Crosses, 1 Distinguished Service Medal, 245 Silver Stars, 21 Legions of Merit, 30 Soldier's Medals, 1,036 Bronze Stars, and 57 Air Medals.

==== Casualties ====
- Total battle casualties: 3,025
- Killed in action: 614
- Wounded in action: 2,407
- Missing in action: 3
- Prisoner of war: 1

==== Commanders ====
- Major General Walter P. Story (March–September 1941)
- Major General Ernest J. Dawley (September 1941 – April 1942)
- Major General Rapp Brush (April 1942 – July 1945)
- Brigadier General Donald J. Myers (July 1945 to inactivation)

=== Korean War ===
==== Commanders ====
- Major General Daniel H. Hudelson (2 Dec 1947 to 1 September 1952)
- Major General Joseph P. Cleland (1952 to 1953)
- Major General Ridgely Gaither (1953 to 1954)

==== Combat chronicle ====
On 1 September 1950, the 40th Infantry Division was again called into active federal service for the Korean War. Shipping out of Oakland and San Francisco, California in late March 1951, the division deployed to Japan for training. For the next nine months, they participated in amphibious, air transportability, and live fire training from Mount Fuji to Sendai. On 23 December, the division received alert orders to move to Korea. The division moved to Korea in January 1952. After additional training, the division moved north in February 1952, where it relieved the 24th Infantry Division on the battle line. At the time the division consisted of the 160th, 223rd, and 224th Infantry Regiments, and smaller non-regiment-sized units.

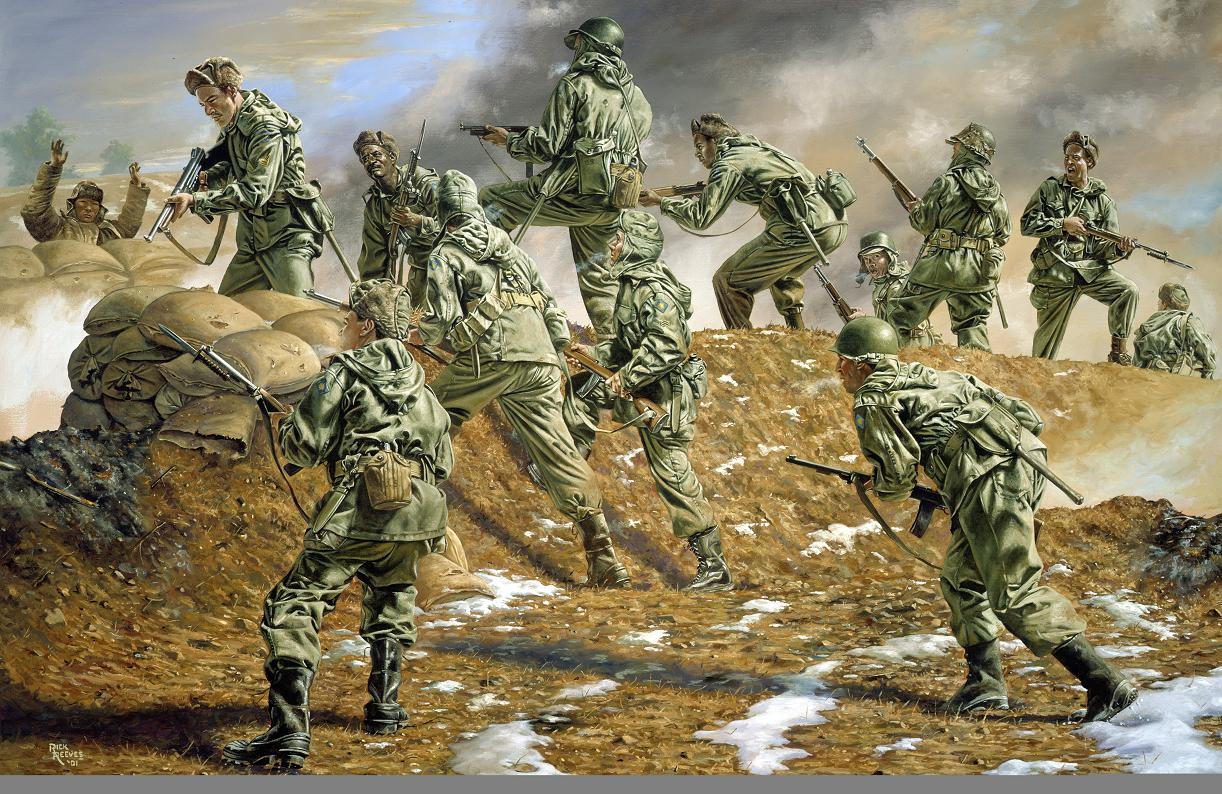
Painting of the 40th Infantry Division in the Kumwha Valley

In Korea, the 40th Infantry Division participated in the battles of Sandbag Castle and Heartbreak Ridge. In these campaigns, the division suffered 1,180 casualties, including 311 who were killed in action, and 47 who later died from wounds received in action. Total division casualties in Korea included 376 killed in action, 1,457 wounded in action, and 47 dead of wounds. After the division was sent back to Japan, its time in Korea was commemorated by the commissioning of a punchbowl created by a local silversmith, by some accounts made up of the melted down Combat Infantryman Badges of the divisions veterans, with the geography of Heartbreak Ridge etched inside the bowl. It was used at ceremonial functions until it was stolen, and was subsequently bought at a garage sale by a married couple, who kept it for 18 years. It was then recovered and put on display at the division headquarters. It is now displayed at the 40th Infantry Division Headquarters and is registered in the National Archives and Records Administration National Archives.

Three members of the division's 223rd Infantry Regiment were awarded the Medal of Honor for their actions during the Korean War: David B. Bleak, Gilbert G. Collier and Clifton T. Speicher. David Hackworth did a combat tour as company commander of E Company (Heavy Weapons) 1st Battalion 223rd Infantry Regiment and F Company 2nd Battalion 223rd Infantry Regiment in Korea with the division, when it was under the command of Major General Joseph P. Cleland.

After its return from the Korean War, the division was reorganized on 1 July 1954 as the 40th Armored Division. It had three combat commands (A, B, and C) in 1956.

=== Cold War ===
The 1st Battalion, 158th Infantry Regiment (1959–1967), 1st Battalion, 159th Infantry Regiment (1974–1976), 2–159th (1974–2000) and the 160th Infantry Regiment (1974–2000) were part of the division from 1959 until 2000. In 1960, the Division combat units were reorganized under the Combat Arms Regimental Systems (CARS), and then in 1963, was reorganized under the Reorganization Objective Army Divisions (ROAD) concept which changed the combat commands to brigades.

On 13 August 1965, Lieutenant Governor Glenn M. Anderson called out elements of the division to put down the Watts Riots, at the request of Los Angeles Police Chief William H. Parker. The absence of Governor Pat Brown meant Anderson had gubernatorial authority.

On 1 December 1967, a major reorganization of the National Guard reduced the Guard to eight combat divisions, the 40th Armored Division being one of the casualties. On 29 January 1968, the division was eliminated and the 40th Infantry Brigade and 40th Armored Brigade were organized.

On 13 January 1974, the California Army National Guard was reorganized. The 40th and 49th Infantry and the 40th Armored Brigades were inactivated and the 40th Infantry Division was reformed.

Like most reserve component units of the Army, the division sat out the Vietnam War, being left unmobilized, apart from its Aviation Company. In January 1968 the company had been redesignated the 40th Aviation Company, having been previously designated the 29th Aviation Company, part of the 29th Infantry Brigade homebased in Hawaii. The 40th Aviation Company was in active federal service from May 1968 to December 1969. However it does not have any campaign participation credit, and may have been broken up to provide individual augmentees.

In January 1974 Major General Charles A. Ott, Jr. was appointed commander of the division, and he served until accepting appointment as Director of the Army National Guard at the National Guard Bureau later that year.

External image
- Organization of the 40th Infantry Division, 2000

On 30 September 1986, the division's Aviation Brigade was organized and federally recognized at Fresno. In 1987 the division's aviation units were reorganized, and the 140th Aviation Regiment was established.

From 1986 until 1995, the division's CAPSTONE wartime organizational structure included the 140th Military Intelligence Battalion (CEWI) (HD). Allocated to the United States Army Reserve in peacetime, the mission of the battalion was to provide the division commander and G-2 with electronic warfare intelligence and analysis, as well limited counterintelligence/interrogation support and long range surveillance. The battalion's long-range surveillance detachment was stripped from the battalion in peacetime and allocated to the California Army National Guard.

=== Order of battle 1990 ===
Order of battle - 1 October, 1990
40th Infantry Division (Mechanized)

- 1st Brigade
  - 2nd Battalion, 159th Infantry (Mech) (M113)
  - 1st Battalion, 184th Infantry (Mech) (M113)
  - 1st Battalion, 149th Armor (M60A3)
- 2nd Brigade
  - 2nd Battalion, 160th Infantry (Mech) (M113)
  - 3rd Battalion, 160th Infantry (Mech) (M113)
  - 1st Battalion, 185th Armor (M60A3)
  - 2nd Battalion, 185th Armor (M60A3)
- 3rd Brigade
  - 4th Battalion, 160th Infantry (Mech) (M113)
  - 3rd Battalion, 185th Armor (M60A3)
  - 1st Battalion, 221st Armor (M60A3) (Nevada Army National Guard)
- 40th Infantry Division Artillery
- 40th Combat Aviation Brigade
  - 1st Squadron, 18th Cavalry (M60A3/M113)
  - 1st Battalion, 140th Aviation (AH-1)
  - D Company, 140th Aviation (Cmd)(GS) (UH-1)
  - E Company, 140th Aviation (Assault) (UH-60)
- 40th Infantry Division Support Command
  - 540th Support Battalion (Main)
  - 40th Support Battalion (FWD) (2x2)
  - 240th Support Battalion (FWD) (2x1)
  - 340th Support Battalion (FWD)(1x2)
  - F Company, 140th Aviation (MAINT)
- 40th Infantry Division Troops

=== Post Cold War ===
The 40th Infantry Division was not deployed in the Persian Gulf War.

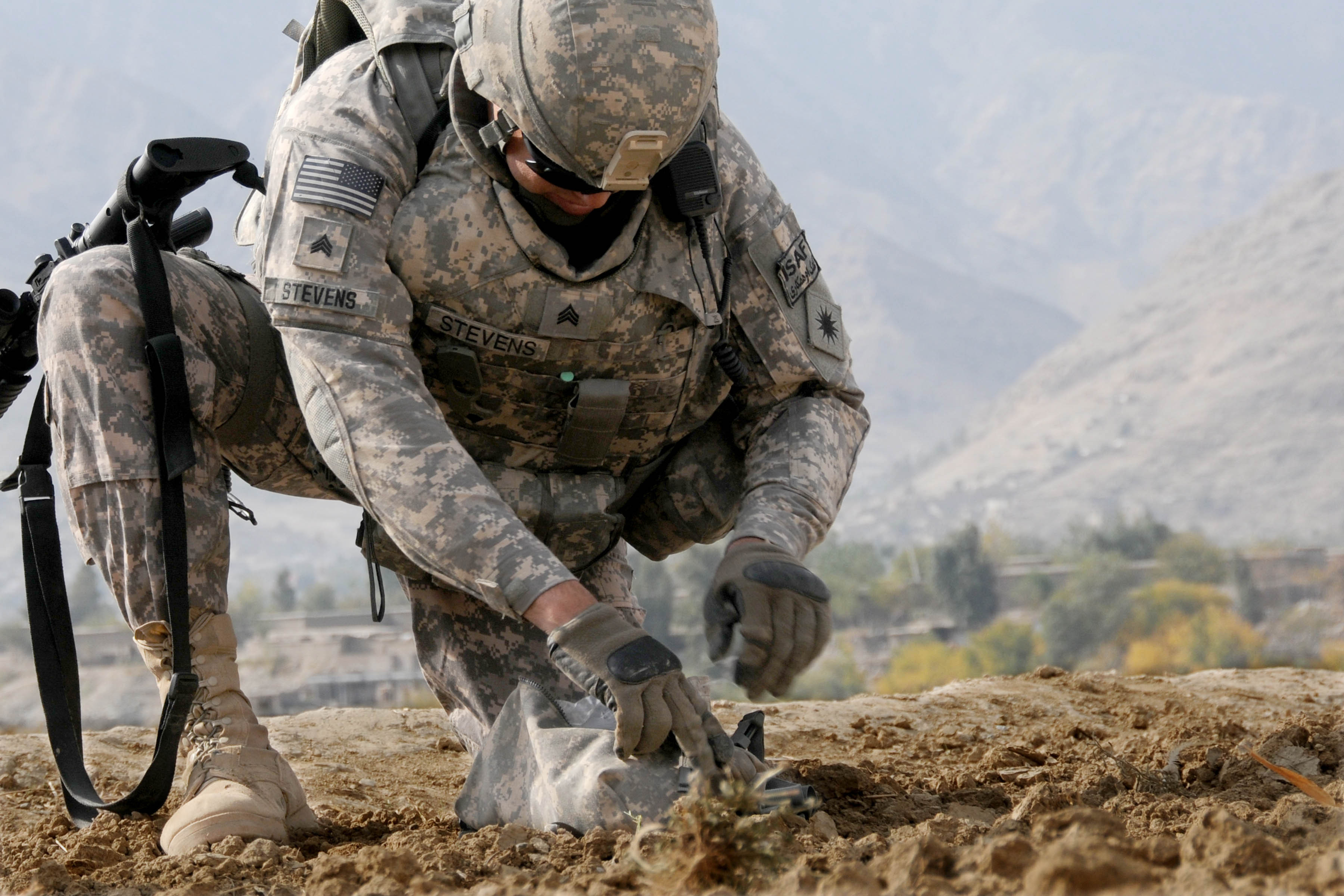
40th Infantry Division Agribusiness Development Team in Afghanistan

On 29 April 1992, Governor Pete Wilson ordered elements of the 40th Infantry Division to duty to put down the so-called "Rodney King" riots. The 40th ID responded quickly by calling up some 2,000 soldiers, but could not get them to the city until nearly twenty-four hours had passed, due to a lack of proper equipment, training, and available ammunition, which had to be picked up from Camp Roberts, California (near Paso Robles). Initially, they only secured areas previously cleared of rioters by police. Later, they actively ran patrols, maintained checkpoints, and provided firepower for law enforcement. By 1 May, the call-up had increased to 4,000 soldiers continuing to move into the city in Humvees, who were later federalized under Title 10 USC by President George H. W. Bush.

In 1994, the division was made of three brigades, an aviation brigade, an engineer brigade, a division artillery brigade, and other associated units. Associated regiments included the 160th Infantry, 185th Armor, 221st Armor (Nevada), 159th Infantry, 184th Infantry, 149th Armor, 18th Cavalry, 140th Aviation, 143d Field Artillery, and 144th Field Artillery.

On 17 January 1994, Governor Pete Wilson activated the 40th Infantry Division (M) to respond to the aftermath of the Northridge earthquake, and emergency services were up and running within five hours of the quake.

In November 1997, Battery F (TA), 144th Field Artillery Regiment, represented the state of California in Bosnia. During this deployment, Battery F conducted Firefinder counter-battery radar operations, convoys and base security all with little to no armor, with a high threat of mine strikes and ambushes. Most drivers exceeded 21,000 kilometres (13,000 miles) during the seven months in country.

In November 2000, Battery F was again called to duty for its expertise in the Kosovo region.

Until Battery F's arrival in Afghanistan, radar operations were virtually unknown and uncared for. Nevertheless, the unit quickly became a very important resource and a leading factor in base defense operations.

In July 2006, as part of the Army National Guard's modularization process, the Division reorganized into four Brigade Combat Teams and one aviation brigade. National Guard units from California, Oregon, Hawaii, Arizona, Washington, Alaska, New Mexico, Indiana, Nebraska, Utah and Guam were part of the 40th Infantry Division. On 3 December 2016 the 81st Stryker Brigade Combat Team left the division and joined the 7th Infantry Division as an associate unit of the 2nd Infantry Division.

=== Afghanistan 2017 ===
In September 2017, parts of the division deployed to fight in the War in Afghanistan (2001–2021) as part of Operation Freedom's Sentinel. Members of the division formed the headquarters staff of Train Advise Assist Command – South, commanded by Brig. Gen. John W. Lathrop. This became the division's "first combat deployment since the Korean War." In June 2018, authority of the command was transferred to Brig. Gen. Jeffrey Smiley who took command with a new group of 40th ID Soldiers; in October 2018, Smiley was injured during an insider attack, which resulted in the death of the police chief of Kandahar.

== Division organization in 2026 ==
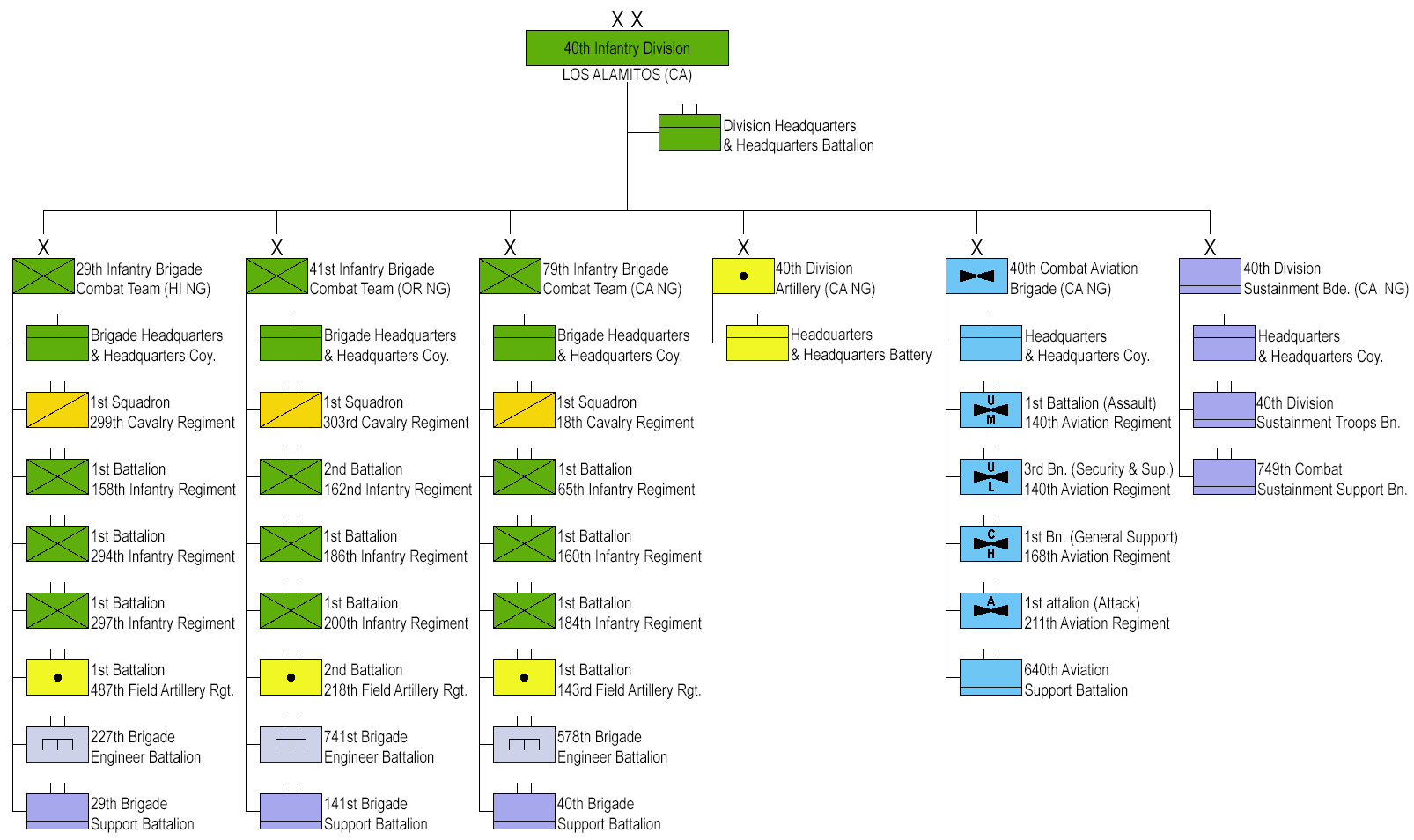
40th Infantry Division organization February 2026 (click to enlarge)

The 40th Infantry Division exercises training and readiness oversight of a division headquarters battalion, three infantry brigade combat Teams, a division artillery, a combat aviation brigade, and a sustainment brigade.

Headquarters and Headquarters Battalion, 40th Infantry Division, at Joint Forces Training Base – Los Alamitos (CA) (California Army National Guard)

- Headquarters Support Company, 40th Infantry Division, at Joint Forces Training Base – Los Alamitos (CA)
- Company A (Operations), HHBN, 40th Infantry Division, at Joint Forces Training Base – Los Alamitos (CA)
- Company B (Intelligence and Sustainment), HHBN, 40th Infantry Division, at Joint Forces Training Base – Los Alamitos (CA)
- Company C (Signal), HHBN, 40th Infantry Division, at Joint Forces Training Base – Los Alamitos (CA)
- 40th Infantry Division Band, at Joint Forces Training Base – Los Alamitos (CA)
  - Detachment 1, 40th Infantry Division Band, in Yuba City (CA)

29th Infantry Brigade Combat Team, in Kalaeloa (HI) (Hawaii Army National Guard)

- 1st Squadron, 299th Cavalry Regiment, in Hilo (HI) (Hawaii Army National Guard)
- 1st Battalion, 158th Infantry Regiment, at Papago Park Military Reservation (AZ) (Arizona Army National Guard)
- 1st Battalion, 294th Infantry Regiment, in Barrigada (GU) (Guam Army National Guard)
- 1st Battalion, 297th Infantry Regiment, at Joint Base Elmendorf–Richardson (AK) (Alaska Army National Guard)
- 1st Battalion, 487th Field Artillery Regiment, in Mililani (HI) (Hawaii Army National Guard)
- 227th Brigade Engineer Battalion, in Kapolei (HI) (Hawaii Army National Guard)
- 29th Brigade Support Battalion, in Honolulu (HI) (Hawaii Army National Guard)

41st Infantry Brigade Combat Team, at Camp Withycombe (OR) (Oregon Army National Guard)

- 1st Squadron, 303rd Cavalry Regiment, in Centralia (WA) (Washington Army National Guard)
- 2nd Battalion, 162nd Infantry Regiment, in Springfield (OR) (Oregon Army National Guard)
- 1st Battalion, 186th Infantry Regiment, in Ashland (OR) (Oregon Army National Guard)
- 2nd Battalion, 186th Infantry Regiment (Mobile), in LaGrande (OR) (Oregon Army National Guard) (ex 3-116th Cavalry)
- 1st Battalion, 200th Infantry Regiment, in Las Cruces (NM) (New Mexico Army National Guard)
- 2nd Battalion, 218th Field Artillery Regiment, in Forest Grove (OR) (Oregon Army National Guard)
- 741st Brigade Engineer Battalion, at Camp Withycombe (OR) (Oregon Army National Guard)
- 141st Brigade Support Battalion, in Portland (OR) (Oregon Army National Guard)

79th Infantry Brigade Combat Team, in San Diego (CA) (California Army National Guard)

- 1st Squadron, 18th Cavalry Regiment, in Azusa (CA) (California Army National Guard) (California Army National Guard)
- 1st Battalion, 65th Infantry Regiment, in Cayey (PR) (Puerto Rico Army National Guard)
- 1st Battalion, 160th Infantry Regiment, in Inglewood (CA) (California Army National Guard)
- 1st Battalion, 184th Infantry Regiment, in Modesto (CA) (California Army National Guard)
- 1st Battalion, 143rd Field Artillery Regiment, in Richmond (CA) (California Army National Guard)
- 578th Brigade Engineer Battalion, in Manhattan Beach (CA) (California Army National Guard)
- 40th Brigade Support Battalion, in Bell (CA) (California Army National Guard)

40th Division Artillery, at Joint Forces Training Base – Los Alamitos (CA) (California Army National Guard)

- Headquarters and Headquarters Battery, 40th Division Artillery, at Joint Forces Training Base – Los Alamitos (CA) (California Army National Guard)

40th Combat Aviation Brigade, at Hammer Airfield (CA) (California Army National Guard)

- Headquarters and Headquarters Company, 40th Combat Aviation Brigade, at Hammer Airfield (CA) (California Army National Guard)
- 1st Battalion (Assault), 140th Aviation Regiment, at Joint Forces Training Base – Los Alamitos (CA) (California Army National Guard)
- 3rd Battalion (Security & Support), 140th Aviation Regiment, at Stockton Army Airfield (CA) (California Army National Guard)
- 1st Battalion (General Support Aviation), 168th Aviation Regiment, at Gray Army Airfield (WA) (Washington Army National Guard)
- 1st Battalion (Attack Reconnaissance), 211th Aviation Regiment, at South Valley Regional Airport (UT) (Utah Army National Guard)
- 640th Aviation Support Battalion, at Joint Forces Training Base – Los Alamitos (CA) (California Army National Guard)

40th Division Sustainment Brigade, in Long Beach (CA) (California Army National Guard)

- 40th Division Sustainment Troops Battalion, in Long Beach (CA) (California Army National Guard)
- 746th Division Sustainment Support Battalion, in Burbank (CA) (California Army National Guard)
- 749th Division Sustainment Support Battalion, in Benicia (CA) (California Army National Guard)

== Attached units ==
- 65th Field Artillery Brigade (UT NG)

== Honors ==
The 40th Infantry Division was awarded one campaign streamer in the World War I, three campaign streamers and one unit decoration in World War II, four campaign streamers and one unit decoration in the Korean War, for a total of eight campaign streamers and two unit decorations in its operational history.

=== Unit decorations ===
Ribbon	Award	Year	Notes
Vertical tricolor ribbon (blue, white, red) with gold border	Philippine Republic Presidential Unit Citation	1944–45	for service in the Philippines during World War II
	Republic of Korea Presidential Unit Citation	1952–54	for service in Korea

=== Campaign streamers ===
Conflict	Streamer	Year(s)
World War I	Streamer without description	1918
World War II	Bismarck Archipelego	1943
World War II	Luzon (with Arrowhead)	1945
World War II	Southern Philippines (with Arrowhead)	1945
Korean War	Second Korean Winter	1951–1952
Korean War	Korea, Summer–Fall 1952	1952
Korean War	Third Korea Winter	1952–1953
Korean War	Korea, Summer 1953	1953

== Symbols ==
- Nickname: Sunshine/Sunburst Division (official); Flaming Assholes (unofficial).
- Shoulder patch: A dark blue diamond on which, in yellow, is the sun with 12 rays; the patch is worn diagonally.
- Association: 40th Infantry Division Association

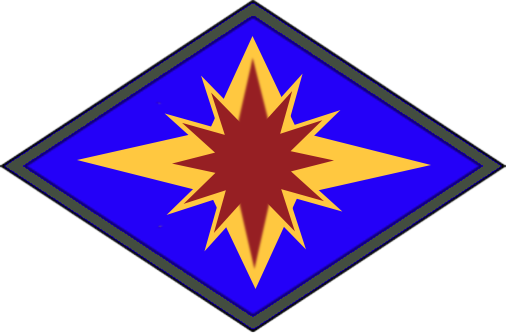
Ball of Fire SSI

The semi-sunburst was suggested as the unit's shoulder sleeve insignia, and represents the division's home of Southern California. The demi fleur-de-lis symbolizes service in France during World War I. The outer rim of the sun rays refers to the Philippine Presidential Unit Citation award. The red arrowhead alludes to firepower of the division and represents their assault landing at Luzon in World War II. The Torri gate, a symbol of the Far East, refers to the award of the Republic of Korea Presidential Unit Citation.

The unofficial nickname came from the Korean War era when the unit was training in Japan. It was a combined result of disparaging remarks made by Army regulars about the National Guard division and the appearance of the unit shoulder sleeve insignia. The California Guardsmen took to their new nickname with a soldier's sense of humor, and turned it into a rallying symbol.

== Heritage ==
During the Korean War, members of the 40th Infantry Division raised funds for and built the School at Gapyeong County in 1952.

Originally named the Kenneth Kaiser Middle School (in honor of Kenneth Kaiser, Jr., a Los Angeles sergeant who was the division’s first soldier killed in action in the Korean War), the school’s name was changed to Gapyeong Middle School and Gapyeong High School in 1972.

The 40th Infantry Division also built Kwanin Middle School and Kwanin High School at Kwanin Township, Pocheon in 1955.

In addition to the schools, the 40th Infantry Division built hospitals and other public facilities at Kwanin Township in an area called "Sunburst Village."

After the Korean War, former commander Joseph P. Cleland and other veterans of the 40th Infantry Division continued to support the schools through donations, have returned to attend graduations and present scholarships, and attended the opening of the Kaiser Hall Museum in 2008

== See also ==
- John C. Sjogren Medal of Honor WW2
- Clifton T. Speicher Medal of Honor Korea
- David B. Bleak Medal of Honor Korea
- Gilbert G. Collier Medal of Honor Korea
- Edward C. Meyer
- Charles A. Ott Jr.
- Thomas K. Turnage
- Laura Yeager
