= David B. Bleak =

United States Army Medal of Honor recipient

David Bruce Bleak
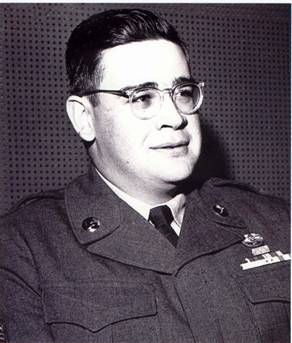
- Born: 27 February 1932; Idaho Falls, Idaho
- Died: 23 March 2006 (aged 74); Arco, Idaho
- Burial place: cremated; ashes scattered; cenotaph at Lost River Cemetery, Moore, Idaho
- Military career
- Allegiance: United States of America
- Branch: United States Army
- Service years: 1950–1953
- Rank: Staff Sergeant
- Units: 2nd Battalion, 223rd Infantry Regiment, 40th Infantry Division
- Conflicts: Korean War
- Awards: Medal of Honor; Purple Heart

David Bruce Bleak (27 February 1932 – 23 March 2006) was a soldier of the United States Army during the Korean War. Bleak rose to the rank of staff sergeant and was awarded the Medal of Honor, the highest military decoration of the United States, for his actions near Minari-gol, South Korea, on 14 June 1952.

Born in Idaho, Bleak dropped out of school to become a combat medic, and was deployed to Korea with the 40th Infantry Division. During a mission north into Chinese territory, Bleak's patrol came under heavy attack from fortified Chinese positions. Despite being wounded himself, Bleak rushed the Chinese troops multiple times and killed five of them—four using only his hands—before assisting the wounded, and shielding another soldier from a grenade blast. Bleak is credited with saving the patrol's wounded and ensuring that all of its members returned to allied lines. For these actions, he was awarded the Medal of Honor.

In the years preceding and following his military service, Bleak worked numerous jobs around Idaho and Wyoming, working as a rancher, dairy farmer, truck driver, and meat cutter before retiring as a radioactive waste technician at the Idaho National Engineering Laboratory. He died in 2006 from emphysema, Parkinson's disease, and complications from a hip fracture.

== Early life ==
David Bruce Bleak was born on 27 February 1932 to William Bleak and Tamar Bleak (née Young) in Idaho Falls, Idaho, a remote farming community. The seventh of nine children, he dropped out of high school and worked for a time as a farmer and a rancher and also for railroads, but he grew dissatisfied with life in Idaho. He eventually decided to enlist in the US Army, hoping to see the world. Bleak grew to a height of 6 ft 6 in (198 cm) and weighed 250 pounds (110 kg). He was described as humble and quiet throughout his life. Bleak was a member of the Church of Jesus Christ of Latter-day Saints.

== Military service ==
Bleak entered the Army on 1 November 1950, and attended basic combat training at Fort Riley, Kansas. Here, he was selected for medical duty. After the completion of his training, Bleak was assigned to a medical company attached to the 223rd Infantry Regiment, 40th Infantry Division of the California Army National Guard. Shortly after Bleak was assigned to the unit, it was selected for deployment to the Korean War. He was moved to Camp Cooke in Lompoc, California, for advanced medical training in preparation for his deployment.

The 40th Infantry Division shipped out to Korea in January 1952, and shortly thereafter, Bleak was promoted to sergeant. His unit was assigned to a mountainous area near Minari-gol, South Korea, along the 38th Parallel. By that point in the war, the fronts had largely stabilized, and the duty in the area was characterized by constant, low-level trench warfare and continued battles over the same ground which produced high casualties. Bleak served as a field medic, assisting troops on the front lines instead of in Mobile Army Surgical Hospital units.

=== Medal of Honor action ===
On 14 June 1952, Bleak was part of a patrol of the 2nd Battalion, 223rd Infantry, sent north to probe Chinese forward positions and attempt to capture Chinese soldiers for interrogation. Bleak volunteered to accompany the 20-man patrol of an I&R Platoon on this mission, which was to send them to a sparsely vegetated feature called Hill 499, where Chinese forces were known to be operating. The patrol left United Nations lines at 04:30 Korea Standard Time on 14 June, under cover of darkness. It was preceded by an attack by F Company, 223rd Infantry, to the west which was intended as a distraction. (Note: The F Company diversionary attack may have been the action for which Corporal Clifton T. Speicher was himself awarded the Medal of Honor. (Ecker 2004, p. 138)) However, as the patrol ascended the hill, it came under heavy Chinese automatic weapons fire which struck the lead elements, injuring several soldiers. Bleak, at the rear of the formation, rushed forward and treated and stabilized several soldiers hit in the initial volley, then followed the remainder of the patrol as it continued its mission.

As they attempted to continue up the hill, several Chinese soldiers from a nearby trench opened fire, injuring another soldier. According to eyewitness reports, Bleak rushed the trench and dove into it, tackling one Chinese soldier and breaking the man's neck with only his hands, killing him. Bleak was then confronted by a second soldier, whom he reportedly grabbed by the neck, fatally crushing his windpipe. A third Chinese soldier then approached, and in the ensuing scuffle, Bleak used his combat knife to kill him.

Bleak then returned to the patrol and attempted to treat more wounded members, but soon thereafter a Chinese hand grenade bounced off the helmet of the soldier standing next to him and landed nearby. Bleak tackled the soldier and covered him with his larger frame to protect him from the grenade, but neither was injured in the ensuing blast. The patrol then continued on its mission and was successful in capturing several Chinese prisoners. However, as it descended Hill 499 to return to UN lines, they were ambushed by another group of Chinese hidden in a trench with an automatic weapon. Three soldiers were wounded in the attack, and as Bleak attempted to run to them, he was hit in the leg. Bleak dressed all four wounds, but one of the men was so badly wounded he could not move. In spite of continued Chinese fire and his own injury, Bleak picked up the wounded soldier and began to carry him down the hill. As he attempted to withdraw with the wounded soldier, Bleak was confronted by two more Chinese. Putting down the soldier, Bleak reportedly surprised the Chinese soldiers by charging them and smashing their heads together with such force that he may have fractured the skulls of one or both of the assailants before pushing them out of his way. Eventually, all 20 men of the patrol returned to the UN lines, but a third of them were wounded. Bleak was credited with saving the patrol, both by promptly treating the wounded and by aggressively attacking and killing or neutralizing five Chinese soldiers.

Bleak reportedly suffered nerve damage as a result of his leg wound. His wounds required hospitalization, but he returned to duty on 9 July 1952. His tour in Korea ended shortly after the event. He finished his enlistment by serving in Japan, and on 27 October 1953 he was awarded the Medal of Honor in a ceremony at the White House with President Dwight D. Eisenhower. He retired from the Army as a staff sergeant.

== Civilian life ==
After leaving the military at the end of the Korean War, Bleak returned to Idaho. He later moved to Wyoming, where he took various jobs as a truck driver, a grocery store meat cutter, and a rancher. He eventually married and had four children with his wife, Lois Pickett Bleak. in 1966, he moved to Moore, Idaho, where he ran a dairy farm for 10 years. He eventually became a janitor at the Idaho National Engineering Laboratory, where he worked his way up until his retirement in the mid-1990s as chief hot cell technician, responsible for disposing of spent nuclear fuel rods.

He died on 23 March 2006, at the Lost Rivers District Hospital in Arco, Idaho, from emphysema, Parkinson's disease, and complications from a hip fracture. He died the same day as another Medal of Honor recipient, Desmond Doss. At the time of his death, he had nine grandchildren and six great-grandchildren. His body was cremated and his remains were scattered in Idaho, at his favorite fishing location. His family later placed a cenotaph in his honor at the Lost River Cemetery in Butte County, Idaho.

== Honors ==
In 1995 a medical clinic at Fort Sill, Oklahoma, was named for Bleak, and following his death, the Governor of Oklahoma declared 14 June 2007 "Sergeant David Bruce Bleak Day" for the 55th anniversary of Bleak's accomplishments. On 14 June 2006, Bleak's family presented his Medal of Honor to the Idaho Military History Museum, where it is now displayed, alongside that of fellow Idaho recipient Gurdon H. Barter.

== Medal of Honor citation ==
Bleak was one of eight field medics and corpsmen to be awarded the Medal of Honor in Korea. However, he was one of only two-the other being William R. Charette-for whom the decoration was not posthumous. Those recognized after their deaths were Richard G. Wilson and Bryant E. Womack from the Army, and Edward C. Benfold, Richard Dewert, Francis C. Hammond, and John E. Kilmer from the US Navy.

Sgt. Bleak, a member of the medical company, distinguished himself by conspicuous gallantry and indomitable courage above and beyond the call of duty in action against the enemy. As a medical aidman, he volunteered to accompany a reconnaissance patrol committed to engage the enemy and capture a prisoner for interrogation. Forging up the rugged slope of the key terrain, the group was subjected to intense automatic weapons and small arms fire and suffered several casualties. After administering to the wounded, he continued to advance with the patrol. Nearing the military crest of the hill, while attempting to cross the fire-swept area to attend the wounded, he came under hostile fire from a small group of the enemy concealed in a trench. Entering the trench he closed with the enemy, killed 2 with bare hands and a third with his trench knife. Moving from the emplacement, he saw a concussion grenade fall in front of a companion and, quickly shifting his position, shielded the man from the impact of the blast. Later, while ministering to the wounded, he was struck by a hostile bullet but, despite the wound, he undertook to evacuate a wounded comrade. As he moved down the hill with his heavy burden, he was attacked by 2 enemy soldiers with fixed bayonets. Closing with the aggressors, he grabbed them and smacked their heads together, then carried his helpless comrade down the hill to safety. Sgt. Bleak's dauntless courage and intrepid actions reflect utmost credit upon himself and are in keeping with the honored traditions of the military service.

== Awards and Decorations ==
Bleak's awards include:

Combat Medical Badge
| Medal of Honor | | Purple Heart |
| Army Good Conduct Medal | Army of Occupation Medal | National Defense Service Medal |
| Korean Service Medal with 2 Campaign stars | United Nations Service Medal Korea | Korean War Service Medal Retroactively Awarded, 2003 |
Korean Presidential Unit Citation

40th Infantry Division Combat Identification Badge

== See also ==
- List of Medal of Honor recipients
- List of Korean War Medal of Honor recipients
