= Thomas Seelye Arms =

United States Army general

- Born: March 22, 1893; Cleveland, Ohio, US
- Died: 30 September 1970 (aged 77)
- Allegiance: United States
- Branch: United States Army
- Rank: Brigadier General
- Commands: 159th Infantry, Replacement and Training Command
- Conflicts: World War II
- Awards: Distinguished Service Medal, Legion of Merit

Thomas Seelye Arms (March 22, 1893 – September 30, 1970) was a brigadier general during World War II. During the war, He commanded the 159th Infantry Regiment and the Replacement and Training Command.

== Early life and career ==
Arms was born in Cleveland, Ohio. Prior to military service, he attended Virginia Military Institute and graduated with a bachelor's degree in science. During World War I, he was commissioned into the infantry. After the war, Arms served as instructor at the Infantry School and the Ohio National Guard.

== World War II ==
During World War II, Arms was commander of the 159th Infantry regiment until 1942. He was an instructor in China and India until February 1945. In March of that year, he was promoted to Brigadier General, but reverted to Colonel in the following month. In the final year of his service, Arms was commander of the Replacement and Training Command.

== Later life ==
Arms retired from service in September 1946. He died on September 30, 1970. He was buried in Arlington National Cemetery.

== Personal life ==
Arms had a son named Thomas Seelye Arms Jr., who also was an American military officer.
