= Gilbert G. Collier =

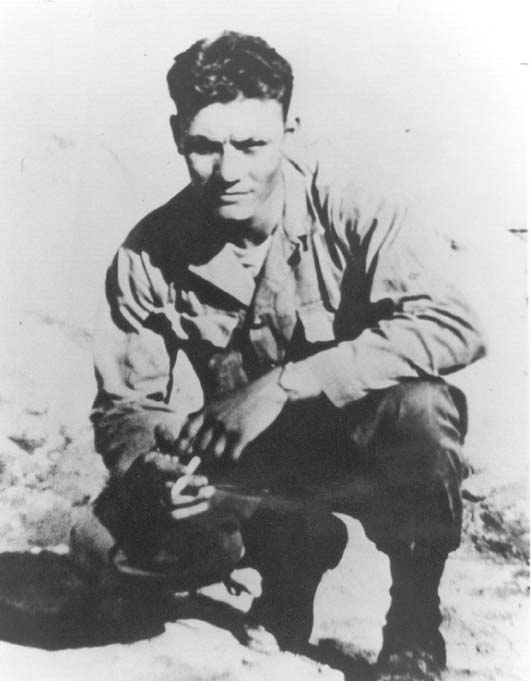
- Medal of Honor recipient Gilbert Collier
- Born: December 30, 1930; Hunter, Arkansas
- Died: July 20, 1953 (aged 22) near Tutayon, Korea
- Military career
- Allegiance: United States of America
- Branch: United States Army
- Service years: 1951–1953
- Rank: Sergeant (posthumous)
- Units: 2nd Battalion, 223rd Infantry Regiment, 40th Infantry Division
- Conflicts: Korean War (DOW)
- Awards: Medal of Honor; Purple Heart

Gilbert Georgie Collier (December 30, 1930 – July 20, 1953) was a soldier in the United States Army during the Korean War. He posthumously received the Medal of Honor for his actions on 19–20 July 1953.

Collier joined the Army from Tichnor, Arkansas in 1951.

== Medal of Honor citation ==
Rank and organization: Sergeant (then Cpl.), U.S. Army, Company F, 223rd Infantry Regiment, 40th Infantry Division

Place and date: Near Tutayon, Korea, 19 – July 20, 1953

Entered service at: Tichnor Ark. Born: December 30, 1930, Hunter, Ark.

G.O. No.: 3, January 12, 1955

Citation:

Sgt. Collier, a member of Company F, distinguished himself by conspicuous gallantry and indomitable courage above and beyond the call of duty in action against the enemy. Sgt. Collier was pointman and assistant leader of a combat patrol committed to make contact with the enemy. As the patrol moved forward through the darkness, he and his commanding officer slipped and fell from a steep, 60-foot cliff and were injured. Incapacitated by a badly sprained ankle which prevented immediate movement, the officer ordered the patrol to return to the safety of friendly lines. Although suffering from a painful back injury, Sgt. Collier elected to remain with his leader, and before daylight they managed to crawl back up and over the mountainous terrain to the opposite valley where they concealed themselves in the brush until nightfall, then edged toward their company positions. Shortly after leaving the daylight retreat they were ambushed and, in the ensuing fire fight, Sgt. Collier killed 2 hostile soldiers, received painful wounds, and was separated from his companion. Then, ammunition expended, he closed in hand-to-hand combat with 4 attacking hostile infantrymen, killing, wounding, and routing the foe with his bayonet. He was mortally wounded during this action, but made a valiant attempt to reach and assist his leader in a desperate effort to save his comrade's life without regard for his own personal safety. Sgt. Collier's unflinching courage, consummate devotion to duty, and gallant self-sacrifice reflect lasting glory upon himself and uphold the noble traditions of the military service.

== Awards and decorations ==

`

Badge	Combat Infantryman Badge		
1st row	Medal of Honor		
2nd row	Purple Heart with 1 Oak leaf cluster	Army Good Conduct Medal	National Defense Service Medal
3rd row	Korean Service Medal with 4 Campaign stars	United Nations Service Medal Korea	Korean War Service Medal
Unit awards	Presidential Unit Citation		

== See also ==
- List of Medal of Honor recipients
- List of Korean War Medal of Honor recipients
