= Clifton T. Speicher =

United States Army Medal of Honor recipient

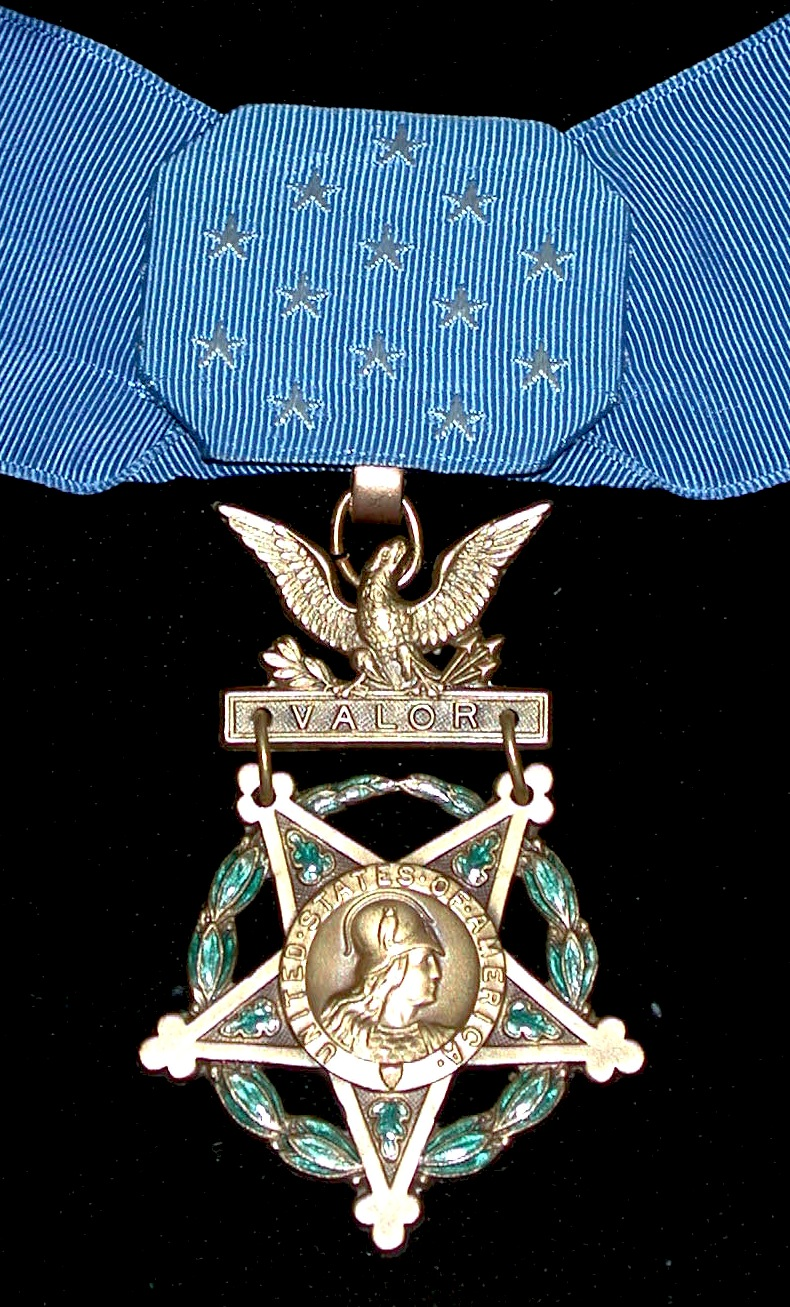
- Medal of Honor recipient
- Born: March 25, 1931; Gray, Pennsylvania, US
- Died: June 14, 1952 (aged 21); Near Minarigol, Korea
- Military career
- Allegiance: United States
- Branch: United States Army
- Service years: 1951 - 1952
- Rank: Corporal
- Units: 223rd Infantry Regiment, 40th Infantry Division
- Conflicts: Korean War †
- Awards: Medal of Honor; Purple Heart

Clifton T. Speicher (March 25, 1931 – June 14, 1952) was a United States Army soldier in the Korean War who posthumously received the U.S. military's highest decoration, the Medal of Honor.

Born on March 25, 1931, in Gray, Pennsylvania, Speicher joined the Army from that city in 1951. By June 14, 1952, he was serving in Korea as a corporal in Company F of the 223rd Infantry Regiment, 40th Infantry Division. On that day, during an attack against a hostile position near Minarigol, his squad came under intense small-arms, mortar, and machine gun fire. Although wounded, Speicher charged the machine gun nest and killed the occupants with his rifle and bayonet. He was wounded again during his approach and died shortly after silencing the emplacement. For these actions, he was posthumously awarded the Medal of Honor a year later, on August 19, 1953.

== Medal of Honor citation ==
Speicher's official Medal of Honor citation reads:

Cpl. Speicher distinguished himself by conspicuous gallantry and indomitable courage above and beyond the call of duty in action against the enemy. While participating in an assault to secure a key terrain feature, Cpl. Speicher's squad was pinned down by withering small-arms, mortar, and machine gun fire. Although already wounded he left the comparative safety of his position, and made a daring charge against the machine gun emplacement. Within 10 yards of the goal, he was again wounded by small-arms fire but continued on, entered the bunker, killed 2 hostile soldiers with his rifle, a third with his bayonet, and silenced the machine gun. Inspired by this incredible display of valor, the men quickly moved up and completed the mission. Dazed and shaken, he walked to the foot of the hill where he collapsed and died. Cpl. Speicher's consummate sacrifice and unflinching devotion to duty reflect lasting glory upon himself and uphold the noble traditions of the military service.

== See also ==
- List of Korean War Medal of Honor recipients
