= 185th Armor Regiment =

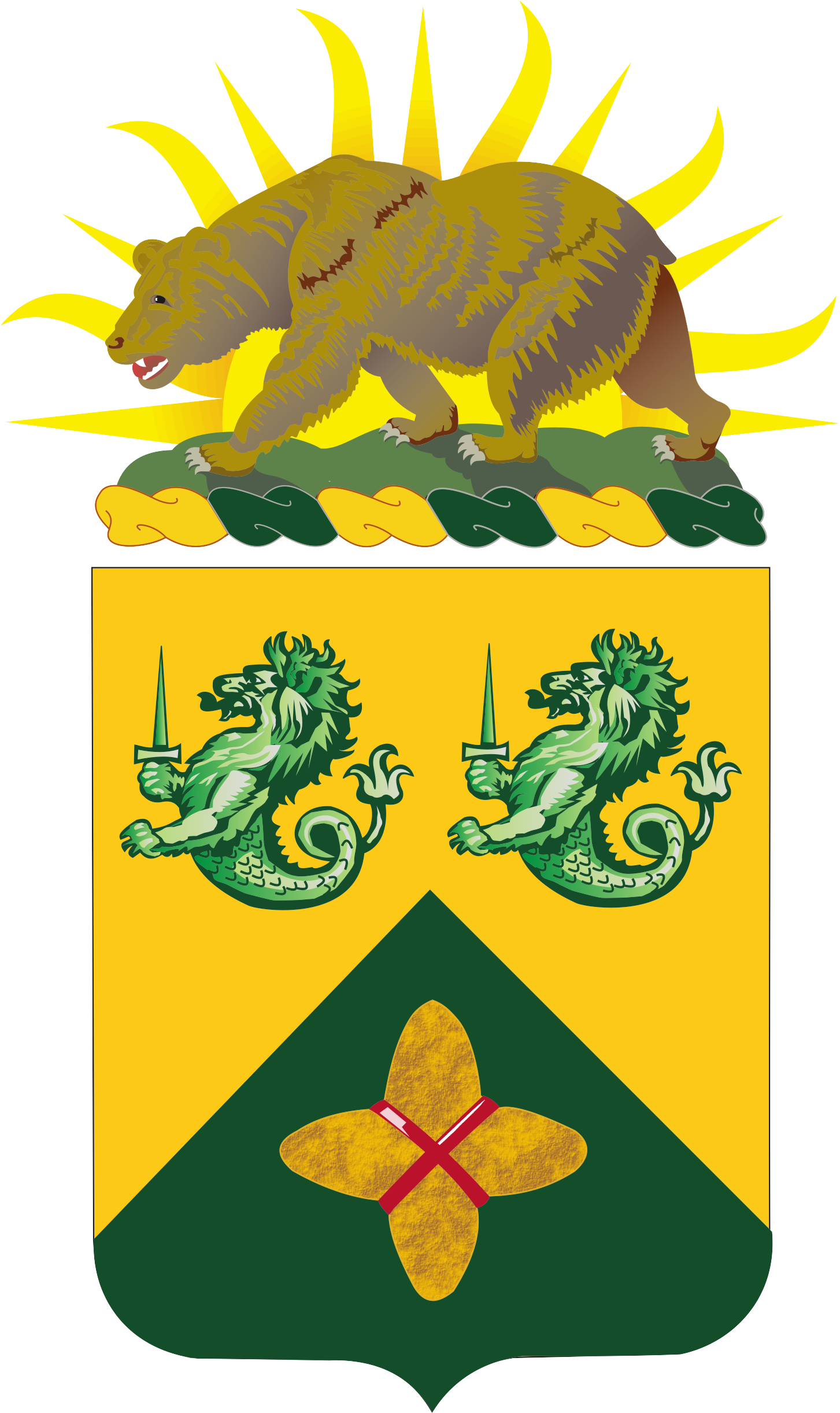
- Coat of arms
- Active: 1885–2016
- Country: United States
- Branch: California Army National Guard
- Type: Armor
- Garrison/HQ: Modesto, California (HQ)
- Motto: Fulmen Jacio (I Hurl The Thunderbolt)
- Engagements: World War I World War II; Korean War; Iraq Campaign
- Decorations: Presidential Unit Citation

Commanders
- Current Commander: LTC Trevor M. Phillips

Insignia
- Distinctive unit insignia

The 185th Armor Regiment was an armor regiment of the United States Army consisting of soldiers from the California Army National Guard.

== History ==
The 185th Armor Regiment was created on 1 July 1959 by combining several existing units. The 185th Armor Regiment shares the lineage of some of those existing units, which can be traced back to 1885 with the 7th Infantry Regiment (California).

=== 1885 – 1917 7th Infantry (California) ===
On 22 July 1885, the 7th Infantry Battalion was constituted in the California National Guard by consolidating existing companies in Los Angeles and San Diego. On 5 May 1888, the 7th Infantry Battalion was expanded, reorganized, and redesignated as the 7th Infantry Regiment (California). On 7 November 1895 the 7th Infantry Regiment (California) was consolidated with the 9th Infantry Regiment (California), which had been organized on 8 February 1890 in the California National Guard, and the consolidated unit was designated as the 7th Infantry Regiment (California).

==== Spanish American War ====
On 9 May 1898, the 7th Infantry Regiment (California) was mustered into federal service at the Presidio of San Francisco, California, as the 7th California Volunteer Infantry. On 2 December 1898, the regiment mustered out of federal service at Los Angeles.

==== World War I ====
On 29 June 1916, the 7th Infantry Regiment (California) was mustered into federal service at Sacramento. On 11 November 1916, the regiment was mustered out of federal service at Los Angeles. On 5 August 1917, the 7th Infantry Regiment (California) was drafted into federal service. From 25 September 1917 through 1 November 1917, the 7th Infantry Regiment (California) was consolidated with the 2nd Battalion, Companies L and M, and the Sanitary Detachment of the 2nd Infantry Regiment (California). The consolidated unit was reorganized and redesignated as the 160th Infantry and assigned to the 40th Division.

=== 1919 – 49 precursor elements ===
The 160th Infantry's performance during World War 1 is discussed here. On 7 May 1919, the 160th Infantry demobilized at Camp Kearny, California.

==== 1919–41 ====
From 23 August 1921 through 6 October 1921, the former southern California elements were reconstituted and reorganized as the 160th Infantry and assigned to the 40th Division in the California National Guard, with headquarters at Los Angeles. On 31 January 1922, the 160th Infantry was federally recognized.

On 1 April 1929, the 2nd Battalion, 160th Infantry was withdrawn, reorganized, and redesignated as the 2nd Battalion, 185th Infantry, an element of the 40th Division (later redesignated as the 40th Infantry Division). Concurrently, the 160th Infantry reorganized with a new 2nd Battalion.

From March through April 1930, the 2nd Battalion, 185th Infantry expanded and reorganized as the 2nd and 3rd Battalions, 185th Infantry.

==== World War II ====
On 3 March 1941, the 160th Infantry and 185th Infantry were inducted into federal service at home stations, and more information regarding their service during the war is available here for the 160th Infantry and here for the 185th Infantry. On 7 April 1946, the 160th Infantry and 185th Infantry were inactivated at Camp Stoneman, California.

==== 1946–50 ====
On 5 August 1946, the 185th Infantry expanded and reorganized, with the 2nd and 3rd Battalions redesignated as the 223rd and 224th Infantry and assigned to the 40th Infantry Division.

On 14 October 1946, the 160th Infantry was reorganized and federally recognized with headquarters at Los Angeles.

On 15 October 1946, the 223rd Infantry and 224th Infantry were organized and federally recognized with headquarters at Pasadena and Ontario, respectively.

==== Korean War ====
On 1 September 1950, the 160th Infantry, 223d Infantry, and 224th Infantry were ordered into active federal service at home stations. On 2 September 1950, the 160th Infantry [NGUS], 223d Infantry [NGUS], and 224th Infantry [NGUS] were organized and federally recognized with headquarters at Los Angeles, Pasadena and Ontario, respectively. The three regiments consisted of the three maneuver units of the 40th Infantry Division, which saw significant action in the Korean War in 1952. More information regarding their service during the war is available here.

==== 1954–1959 ====
On 30 June 1954, the three regiments were released from active federal service and reverted to state control. Federal recognition of 223rd Infantry (NGUS), 224th Infantry (NGUS) and 160th Infantry (NGUS) was concurrently withdrawn.

On 1 July 1954, the units underwent the changes described below that are germane to the lineage of the 185th Armor Regiment. For more information regarding the lineage of the other elements, refer to their respective lineage.

223rd Infantry Regiment. The 2nd battalion, 223rd Infantry Regiment was withdrawn and consolidated with the 3rd Battalion, 111th Armored Cavalry (organized and federally recognized 26 January 1951 with headquarters at Van Nuys). The consolidated unit reorganized and redesignated as the 139th Tank Battalion, an element of the 40th Armored Division, with headquarters at Burbank.

224th Infantry Regiment. The 2nd battalion, 224th Infantry Regiment, was withdrawn, reorganized, and redesignated as the 133d Tank Battalion, an element of the 40th Armored Division, with headquarters at Riverside.

160th Infantry Regiment. The 3rd battalion, 160th Infantry Regiment was withdrawn, reorganized, and redesignated as the 111th Reconnaissance Battalion, an element of the 40th Armored Division, with headquarters at Inglewood.

On 1 July 1959, the 185th Armor Regiment was created as an element of the 40th Armored Division by consolidating the following units: 133rd and 139th Tank Battalions, 111th Reconnaissance Battalion, and 140th and 134th Tank Battalions. The lineage of the 140th and 134th Tank Battalions is described below.

140th Tank Battalion. On 3 December 1941, Company A, 640th Tank Destroyer Battalion was constituted in the Army of the United States. On 19 December 1941, the company was activated at Camp San Luis Obispo, California, with personnel from the 143d Field Artillery, California National Guard. On 13 January 1946, the company was inactivated at Camp Anza, California. On 15 March 1949, the company was reorganized and federally recognized in the California Army National Guard as the 140th Heavy Tank Battalion with headquarters at Barstow and assigned to the 40th Infantry Division (later redesignated as the 40th Armored Division). On 1 September 1950, the battalion was ordered into active federal service at home stations. On 2 September 1952, the battalion was reorganized and federally recognized as the 140th Tank Battalion with headquarters at Barstow. On 14 April 1953, the headquarters was relocated to Pasadena. On 30 June 1954, the battalion was released from active federal service and reverted to state control; concurrently, federal recognition was withdrawn.

134th Tank Battalion. On 13 July 1946, the 109th Cavalry Reconnaissance Squadron, Mechanized was constituted in the California National Guard. On 18 September 1947, the squadron was organized and federally recognized as the 109th Mechanized Cavalry Reconnaissance Squadron with headquarters at Imperial. On 15 September 1949, the squadron was reorganized and redesignated as the 1st Battalion, 111th Armored Cavalry. On 15 December 1950, the headquarters was relocated to El Centro. On 1 July 1954, the battalion was reorganized and redesignated as the 134th Tank Battalion and assigned to the 40th Armored Division.

=== 1959–present ===
==== 1959–2000 ====
On 1 May 1962, the 6th and 7th Medium Tank Battalions were added to the regiment through a reorganization.

On 1 March 1963, the 3rd Medium Tank Battalion was added and the 7th Medium Tank Battalion was removed from the regiment through a reorganization.

On 15 March 1964, the 3rd Reconnaissance Squadron was removed from the regiment through a reorganization.

On 29 January 1968, the regiment was reorganized to include three battalions (1st, 2nd and 3rd) of the 185th Armor Regiment, an element of the 40th Armored Brigade.

On 13 January 1974, the regiment and its three battalions were assigned as an element of the 40th Infantry Division.

On 1 May 1992, the regiment was ordered into active federal service at home stations for the 1992 Los Angeles riots and released on 9 May 1992 whereupon it went on State Active Duty for the remainder of the urban unrest.

On 1 October 2001, Charlie Company, 1st Battalion, 185th Infantry was ordered to active federal service in support of Operation Noble Eagle, and deployed to Fort Huachucca Arizona to guard the Military Intelligence Training Center (which was also the alternate Pentagon following the attacks on 11 September 2001).

In 2002, 1st Battalion, 185th Armor was detached from the 40th Infantry Division and assigned to the 81st Armor Brigade (Washington National Guard).

==== 21st century ====
===== 2004–05 Iraq =====
In early 2004, the 1st Battalion was mobilized for a deployment in support of Operation Iraqi Freedom 01-02 as part of the 81st Heavy Brigade Combat Team. The battalion was responsible for security for three bases south of Baghdad and corresponding route security along main supply routes between Baghdad and Kuwait. The battalion was reorganized and retrained for this deployment which included all but one of the companies (Bravo) deploying as provisional infantry units. The battalion returned to California in March 2005 where it was restructured into a Combined Arms Battalion shortly thereafter. First battalion's Bravo Company, was equipped with M1 Abrams.

The first battalion's Bravo Company (along with other attached battalion elements to specified active duty units) received a Valorous Unit Award for actions as part of the 1st Brigade, 25th Infantry Division in early 2005 as part of operations in support of Iraq's first elections after the fall of Saddam Hussein.

===== 2005–06 Iraq =====
In September 2005, the 2nd Battalion's Bravo Company was mobilized for a deployment in support of Operation Iraqi Freedom. In Iraq, Bravo Company was responsible for the security of more than 2,200 detainees at Abu Ghraib prison until June 2006 when the camp was closed. During their time at the prison, Bravo Company Soldiers foiled several escape attempts. Upon the closure of the prison, it was then the responsibility of the unit to transport approximately 5,000 detainees to various holding facilities throughout Iraq. Following that mission, Bravo Company Soldiers were responsible for convoy security and operational control of a forward operating base where the company's convoy team operated without any coalition or civilian casualties for more than 10,000 miles. In December 2006, Bravo Company demobilized at Fort Lewis, Washington before returning to San Diego, California.

The second battalion's Bravo Company received one Iraq Campaign streamer with the following inscription: NATIONAL RESOLUTION. Bravo Company also received a Meritorious Unit Commendation as part of the 43rd Military Police Brigade, Rhode Island Army National Guard.

On 1 September 2007, the 2nd Battalion was reorganized and eliminated from the regiment.

===== 2008–09 Iraq =====
In August 2008, the first battalion was mobilized for a deployment in support of Operation Iraqi Freedom 08-09 as part of the 81st Heavy Brigade Combat Team. As part of the mobilization, Alpha Company was attached to the first battalion, 184th Infantry Regiment to provide the only mechanized infantry company for their mobilization for Operation Joint Guardian in Kosovo. In turn, the first battalion was augmented with Alpha and Bravo companies from the first battalion, 184th Infantry Regiment. After mobilization, the first battalion completed training in Fort McCoy, Wisconsin, and arrived in Iraq in October 2008.

While in Iraq, the first battalion's Echo Company and Alpha and Bravo companies from the first battalion, 184th Infantry Regiment were attached to the 30th Support Battalion.

The remainder of the first battalion performed a security force mission throughout Multi-National Division-North at COB Speicher near Tikrit, Iraq. With the battalion's headquarters and headquarters company providing command and control, the three companies provided convoy security support to corps assets, which included coalition force operational moves, Kellogg, Brown and Root, and third country national logistical convoys. The first battalion executed more than 1,500 missions, totaling more than 1,000,000 mission miles, throughout MND-N and Multi-National Corps-Iraq without incident. In August 2009, the first battalion returned to California.

The first battalion's Bravo, Charlie and Delta Companies received two Iraq Campaign streamers with the following inscriptions: IRAQI SURGE and IRAQI SOVEREIGNTY and a Meritorious Unit Commendation.

The first battalion's Echo Company received two Iraq Campaign streamers with the following inscriptions: IRAQI SURGE and IRAQI SOVEREIGNTY and a Meritorious Unit Commendation.

===== 2008–09 Kosovo =====
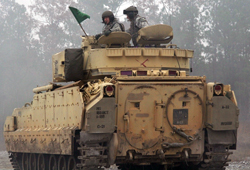
Soldiers from the 185th Armor conduct Mechanized Infantry Training at Camp Shelby in October 2008.

In October 2008, the first battalion's Alpha Company was mobilized under the command of the 184th Infantry Regiment for a deployment to Kosovo as part of the 40th Infantry Division as the only mechanized infantry company. The company mobilized ahead of other units and conducted most of its training separate from its parent unit, because of the need for specialized gunnery training on the company's Bradley vehicles. This training was conducted at Fort Irwin in November and Camp Shelby in December. Once the gunnery training was completed, the company traveled to Camp Atterbury to join its parent unit to complete the required training. The company traveled to JMRC Hohenfels for additional training, before arriving in Kosovo in February. The company was utilized as one of three maneuver companies tasked with providing a safe and secure environment and ensuring freedom of movement in accordance with United Nations Resolution 1244. While accomplishing this mission, the company also was required to both maintain their Bradley Fighting Vehicles as well as their proficiency with using them. In November 2009, the company departed Kosovo to conduct demobilization operations at Fort Lewis near Seattle, Washington and returned to California a few weeks later. While the battalion did not receive campaign participation credit, those Soldiers who served with Alpha company during this deployment received the Kosovo Campaign Medal and the NATO Non-Article 5 Medal.

=== Redesignation ===
On 2 February 2016, the 1st Battalion of the 185th Armor Regiment was redesignated as 1st Battalion of the 185th Infantry Regiment, due to the transition of the 81st Armored Brigade Combat Team to a Stryker brigade. This unit inherits the lineage of the 185th Armor and is not connected with the previous 185th Infantry.

== Subordinate units ==
The first and second battalions remain as active "Combined Arms Battalions" which each typically consist of two armor companies, two infantry companies, and a combat engineer company.

=== First Battalion ===
The first battalion had served as one of two armor battalions of the 81st Heavy Brigade Combat Team in the Washington Army National Guard.

- Headquarters and Headquarters Company was stationed in San Bernardino, California.
- Alpha Company was stationed in Bakersfield, California.
- Bravo Company was stationed in Riverside, California.
- Charlie Company was stationed in Palmdale, California.
- Delta Company was stationed in Madera, California.

=== Second Battalion ===
The second battalion was stationed in Southern California as part of the California Army National Guard.

- Bravo Company was stationed in San Diego, California.

== Notable members ==
- William E. Butterworth, III served with 223rd Infantry Regiment in Korea.
- David Hackworth led F Company, 223rd Infantry Regiment in 1952–1953 in the Korean War.
- Chuck DeVore was the S-2 of the 2-185 Armor during the 1992 Los Angeles riots and served in the unit from 1988 to 1993.

== See also ==
- List of armored and cavalry regiments of the United States Army
