= 185th Infantry Regiment (United States) =

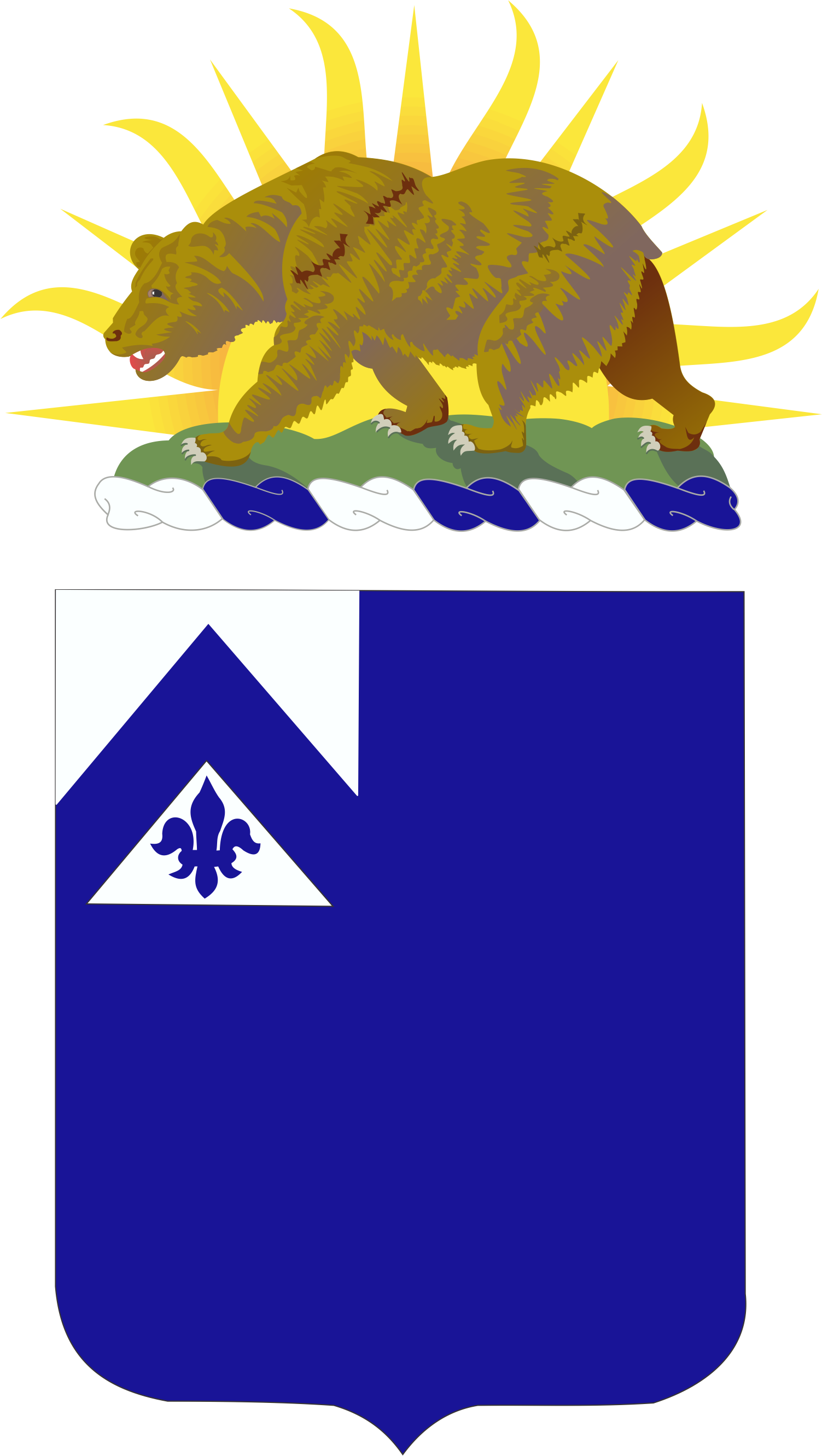
- Coat of arms
- Active: 1885–2008; 2016–present
- Country: United States
- Allegiance: California
- Branch: California Army National Guard
- Type: Infantry
- Size: Battalion
- Garrison/HQ: San Bernardino, California
- Nickname: Sixth California
- Motto: "Nunquom Non Paratus" (Never Unprepared)
- Engagements: World War I World War II; *Bismarck Archipelago; *Luzon; *Southern Philippines; *Normandy; *Northern France; *Rhineland; *Ardennes-Alsace; *Central Europe; Korean War; Vietnam War; War in Southwest Asia; Iraq Campaign
- Decorations: Philippine Presidential Unit Citation; Meritorious Unit Commendation

Insignia
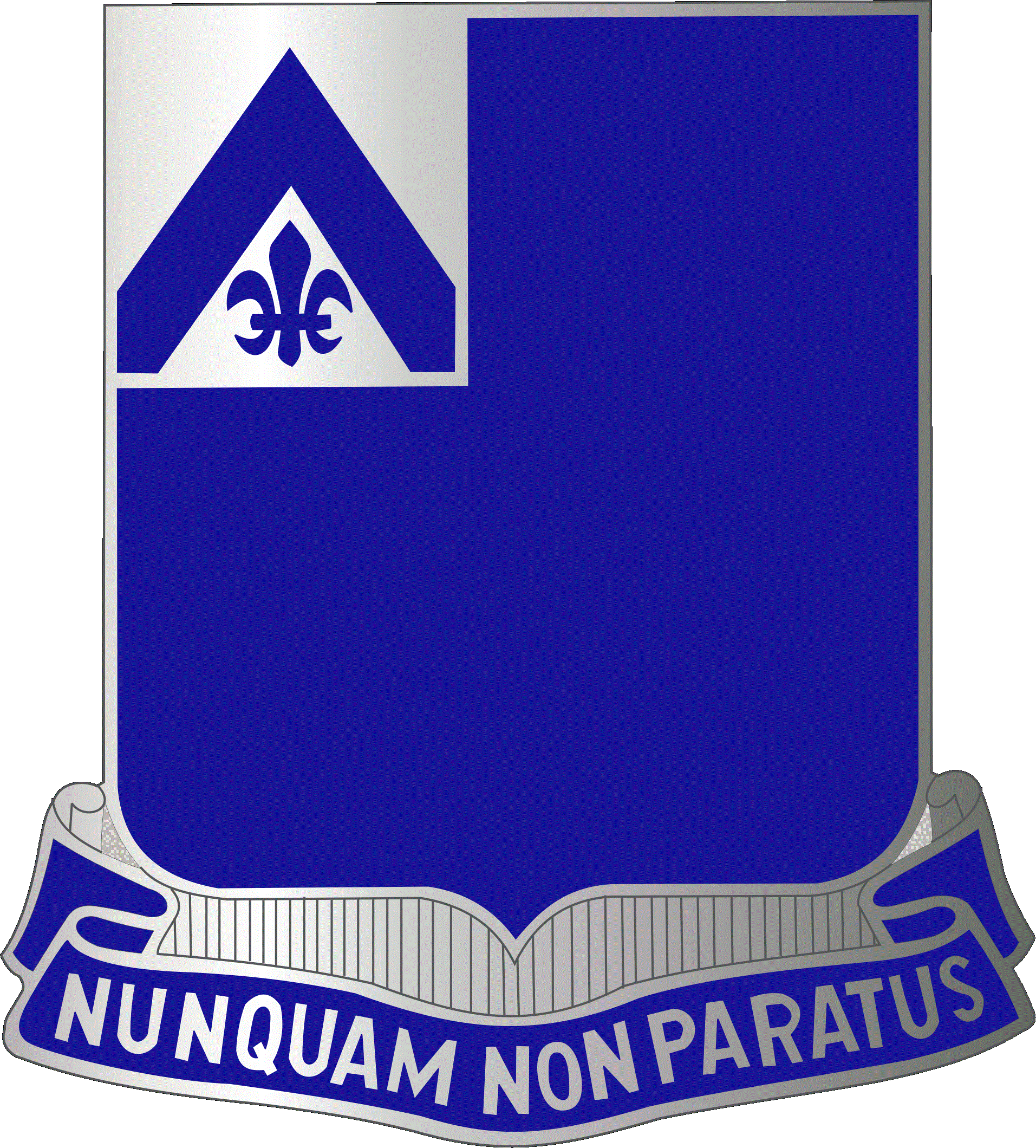
- Distinctive unit insignia

The 185th Infantry Regiment is a unit of the United States Army made up of soldiers from the California Army National Guard, represented by the 1st Battalion, part of the 81st Stryker Brigade Combat Team.

The 185th Infantry was first used for a unit that traced its lineage back to the 6th Infantry Battalion of the California National Guard. The last active unit of the former 185th Infantry was the 1st Battalion, 185th Infantry, part of the 100th Troop Command, headquartered in Moreno Valley, CA. Its higher headquarters, in turn, was the 40th Infantry Division. This unit was disbanded in 2008.

In 2016, the 1st Battalion of the 185th Armor Regiment was redesignated as the 1st Battalion of the 185th Infantry to form the current unit, which is not connected to the previous 185th Infantry.

== History ==
=== 19th century ===
The 1st Battalion, 185th Infantry Regiment was originally constituted on 22 July 1885 as the 6th Infantry Battalion, California National Guard. The unit was expanded, reorganized, and redesignated on 21 February 1888 as the 6th Infantry Regiment. It was mustered into federal service on 11 May 1898 at San Francisco as the 6th California Volunteer Infantry; and mustered out on 15 December 1898 at Fort Point, CA. It was reduced and consolidated on 11 May 1907 with the 2nd Infantry Regiment, California National Guard (organized in 1864 as the Sacramento Light Artillery) to form the 2nd Infantry Regiment, California National Guard, with headquarters at Sacramento.

=== Early 20th century ===
The unit was called into federal service on 15 June 1916 for Mexican border service; mustered into federal service on 27 June 1916 at Sacramento; and mustered out on 15 November 1916. It was called into federal service on 26 March 1917; and drafted into federal service on 5 August 1917.

The 2nd Infantry Regiment (less 2nd Battalion, Companies L and M, and Sanitary Detachment) consolidated on 24 September – 1 November 1917 with the 5th Infantry Regiment, California National Guard, and the consolidated unit was designated as the 159th Infantry, an element of the 40th Division; demobilized on 1 May 1919 at the Presidio of San Francisco, CA. The 2nd Battalion, Companies L and M, and Sanitary Detachment, 2nd Infantry Regiment consolidated on 25 September – 1 November 1917 with the 7th Infantry Regiment, California National Guard, and the consolidated unit was designated as the 160th Infantry, an element of the 40th Division; it demobilized on 7 May 1919 at Camp Kearny in San Diego.

The 185th Infantry Regiment was not re-formed until 1929. The 184th Infantry Infantry was constituted in the National Guard in 1921, assigned to the 40th Division, and allotted to California; the regiment was reorganized in the California National Guard and the headquarters was federally recognized on 20 October 1924 at Sacramento. Beginning in 1929, elements of the 160th and 184th Infantry Regiments stationed in central and northern California, less those in the San Francisco area, were used to form parts of the 185th Infantry Regiment. Other elements of the 185th Infantry Regiment were formed by redesignating existing 185th Infantry units.

Reorganization of 185th Infantry Regiment, 1929–1930
Former 184th/160th Infantry unit	New 185th Infantry unit	Date federally recognized
	Headquarters	1 April 1929
Medical Dept. Detachment, 184th Infantry	Medical Dept. Detachment	1 April 1929
Company C, 184th Infantry	Headquarters Co.	1 April 1929
Headquarters Co., 1st Bn., 184th Infantry	Service Company	1 April 1929
	Howitzer Company	1 April 1929
	Headquarters, 1st Battalion	18 April 1929
Headquarters Co., 3rd Bn., 184th Infantry	Headquarters Co., 1st Battalion	18 April 1929
Company A, 184th Infantry	Company A	1 April 1929
Company B, 184th Infantry	Company B	1 April 1929
	Company C	1 March 1932
Company D, 184th Infantry	Company D	1 April 1929
	Headquarters, 2nd Battalion	27 May 1929
	Headquarters Co., 2nd Battalion	1 April 1929
	Company E	5 March 1930 (originally organized 9 April 1929; redesignated Company I 5 March 1930; reorganized 5 March 1930)
Company F, 160th Infantry	Company F	10 March 1930
	Company G	24 March 1920 (originally organized 27 May 1929; redesignated Company K 5 March 1930; reorganized 24 March 1930)
Company H, 160th Infantry	Company H	1 April 1929
	Headquarters, 3rd Battalion	23 April 1930
	Headquarters Co., 3rd Battalion	17 March 1930
	Company I	5 March 1930 (originally organized as Company E 9 April 1929; redesignated Company I 5 March 1930)
	Company K	5 March 1930 (originally organized as Company G 27 May 1929; redesignated Company K 5 March 1930)
	Company L	5 March 1930
	Company M	12 April 1930

In 1930, the unit's coat of arms were approved.

=== World War II ===
As part of the United States mobilization during World War II, the 185th Infantry Regiment was federalized at Fresno, California, on 3 March 1941 and moved to Camp San Luis Obispo, California, within two weeks. The regiment trained there for over a year as part of the 40th Division before relocating to Fort Lewis, Washington, on 29 April 1942. From there, the regiment went to San Francisco, California, in August and was shipped to Hawaii the following month. The regiment stayed in Hawaii where it trained in jungle warfare for over a year before being moved forward during January 1944 to the Solomon Islands. From April through December the regiment was employed in combat on New Britain island during the New Britain campaign. Then the regiment landed on Manus Island in December 1944 and invaded the Japanese-held Philippine Islands on 9 January 1945. The regiment participated in various actions of the Philippines Campaign of 1944–45 during the rest of the war, and arrived back at San Francisco, California on 5 April 1946, being inactivated the next day.

=== Cold War ===
The regiment was relieved on 25 June 1946 from assignment to the 40th Infantry Division, it was assigned on 5 August 1946 to the 49th Infantry Division. The unit was reorganized and federally recognized on 18 November 1946, with headquarters at Fresno (former 2nd and 3rd Battalions reorganized as the 223rd and 224th Infantry, respectively (separate lineage); and a new 2nd Battalion, 185th Infantry was organized from existing units; 980th Field Artillery Battalion was reorganized, redesignated and federally recognized on 24 August 1947 as the new 3rd Battalion, 185th Infantry).

The unit was reorganized on 1 May 1959 as the 185th Infantry, a parent regiment under the Combat Arms Regimental System, to consist of the 1st Battle Group, an element of the 49th Infantry Division; on 1 March 1963 to consist of the 1st and 2nd Battalions, elements of the 49th Infantry Division (the 2nd Battalion was relieved on 4 December 1963 from assignment to the 49th Infantry Division and assigned to the 49th Infantry Brigade); and on 29 January 1968 to consist of the 2nd Battalion, an element of the 49th Infantry Brigade.

=== 21st century ===
Following the events of 11 September multiple national guard units were activated for various reasons. The 185th was no different with the regiment activated for Operation Noble Eagle, when it was assigned to guard military bases, airports, and other possible targets of opportunity. In late 2003 the 185th was activated again, this time in the wake of the Invasion of Iraq. This is not to be confused with the activation of the 185th Armor Regiment, which was activated at the same time. In 2005, the unit returned from active duty. In 2006, Headquarters Company was activated, and was deployed to Camp Bucca, Iraq for a year.

During the 2006–07 deployment when the regiment's only death, as of June 2009, occurred. Specialist Sellen, posthumously promoted to sergeant, was killed while attached to 16th MP Brigade due to an accidental discharge of a firearm by a fellow soldier.

In early 2007, the Company C of the 1st Battalion was mobilized for a deployment in support of Operation Iraqi Freedom under the command of 1st Battalion, 143rd Field Artillery of the California Army National Guard. After completing training at Fort Dix, New Jersey, the company moved to Camp Slayer in Baghdad, Iraq and conducted force protection, convoy security, and military police missions throughout the country. During their six months in Iraq, they completed over 250 successful combat missions, including the care and custody of over 2,000 detainees and escorting numerous high-profile detainees to Iraqi courts in Baghdad. On 22 February 2008, the company transferred responsibility to Charlie company, 1st Battalion, 279th Infantry Regiment of the Oklahoma Army National Guard. In March 2008, the company returned to Los Alamitos. The company received a Meritorious Unit Commendation for their service pursuant to Department of the Army Permanent Orders 272-43 dated 29 September 2009.

The regiment was disbanded in 2008.

==== New lineage ====
On 2 February 2016, the 1st Battalion of the 185th Armor Regiment was redesignated as 1st Battalion of the 185th Infantry Regiment, due to the transition of the 81st Armored Brigade Combat Team to a Stryker brigade. This unit inherits the lineage of the 185th Armor and is not connected with the previous 185th Infantry.

== Notes ==
1. Organized as Company E, 6th Infantry 9 December 1887; redesignated Company D, 2nd Infantry 11 May 1907; disbanded 5 May 1909; reorganized as 1st Separate Company, Infantry, 13 Apr 1915; redesignated Company D, 2nd Infantry 27 June 1916; redesignated CoM159th Infantry 1 November 1917; reorganized and recognized as Company M, 184th Infantry 16 May 1924; redesignated Company H, 184 Infantry 1 July 1924; redesignated Company M, 184th Infantry 1 October 1924; redesignated Company D, 184th Infantry 26 April 1926; redesignated Company D, 185th Infantry 1 April 1929.
2. Originally organized as a separate company, infantry, in August 1918; recognized 28 June 1919; redesignated Company F, 1st Separate Battalion 22 July 1919; redesignated Company F, 3rd Separate Battalion 1 February 1921; redesignated Company F, 160th Infantry 23 August 1921; redesignated Company F, 185th Infantry 1 April 1929; redesignated Company L, 185th Infantry 5 March 1930; Company F, 185th Infantry reorganized 10 March 1930.
3. Originally organized as a separate company, infantry, in August 1918; recognized 28 June 1919; redesignated Company F, 1st Separate Battalion 22 July 1919; redesignated Company F, 3rd Separate Battalion 1 February 1921; redesignated Company F, 160th Infantry 23 August 1921; redesignated Company F, 185th Infantry 1 April 1929; redesignated Company L, 185th Infantry 5 March 1930; Company F, 160th Infantry reorganized 2 June 1930.
