= Ridgely Gaither =

United States general

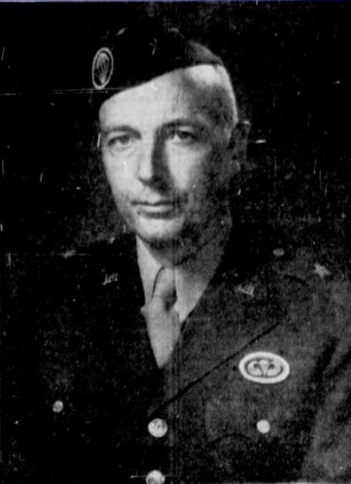
- Ridgely Gaither as commander of the 11th Airborne Division in 1952
- Born: 23 February 1903; Baltimore, Maryland, U.S.
- Died: 26 October 1992 (aged 89); Annapolis, Maryland, U.S.
- Burial place: Arlington National Cemetery
- Military career
- Allegiance: United States
- Branch: United States Army
- Service years: 1924–1962
- Rank: Lieutenant General
- Commands: Army Parachute School; 82nd Airborne Division; 11th Airborne Division; 40th Infantry Division; XVIII Airborne Corps; U.S. Army Caribbean Command; Second United States Army
- Conflicts: World War II; Korean War
- Awards: Army Distinguished Service Medal (2); Silver Star (2); Legion of Merit; Bronze Star Medal
- Other work: Police Commissioner, Annapolis, Maryland

Ridgely Gaither (23 February 1903 – 26 October 1992) was a United States Army lieutenant general prominent as commander of the 40th Infantry Division during the Korean War, and commander of the XVIII Airborne Corps, U.S. Army Caribbean Command and Second United States Army.

== Early life ==
Gaither was born in Baltimore, Maryland, on 23 February 1903, to a family which included numerous Continental Army and United States Army officers since the American Revolutionary War and is the namesake of the suburban town of Gaithersburg in Montgomery County, Maryland, northwest of Washington, D.C.. His first name, "Ridgely" comes from his mother's maiden name, representing another prominent Maryland family. Gaither graduated from St. John's College in the state capital of Annapolis, Maryland and received his commission as a second lieutenant of Infantry in the United States Army in 1924.

== Military career ==
Gaither served in positions of increasing responsibility and rank, including assignments in the continental United States, Alaska, Hawaii and China. He graduated from the Infantry Officer Course in 1933 and the Command and General Staff College in 1939.

=== World War II ===
An early advocate of using paratroopers in offensive military operations, from 1943 to 1944 Gaither commanded the Army Parachute School, receiving promotion to brigadier general.

While there, he was instrumental in forming the 555th Parachute Infantry Battalion ("Triple Nickels"), a segregated unit which was the U.S. Army's first African-American paratrooper unit.

In 1945, Gaither went to Europe to take part in fighting against Nazi Germany, including a combat parachute jump with the 17th Airborne Division. He landed east of the Rhine River, almost on top of a German anti-aircraft battery. The Americans took the position, and Gaither said later that one group of Germans might have been taken prisoner sooner if he had not shot down their white flag of surrender, which was so dirty he did not immediately recognize it.

Later in 1945, General Gaither was assigned as assistant division commander of the 86th Infantry Division in the Philippines, where he served until the end of the war and immediately afterwards.

=== Interbellum ===
Following the Second World War, from 1946 until 1949, Gaither served as assistant division commander of the 88th Infantry Division, with duty on the border between the northeast corner of Italy and the northwest corner of Yugoslavia, along the Adriatic Sea coast. He also served as a member of the Allied commission that established the new international border, and as military governor of the Italian port city of Trieste, and as president of the War Crimes Court for the Allied Powers in Florence, Italy.

Gaither briefly commanded the famous 82nd Airborne Division from July to October 1949.

From 1949 to 1951, Gaither served in the Operations Division of the Office of the Army's Deputy Chief of Staff for Operations.

Gaither commanded the 11th Airborne Division from 1951 to 1953.

=== Korean War ===
General Gaither was commander of the 40th Infantry Division from 1953 to 1954 and saw combat during the Battle of Heartbreak Ridge.

=== Senior command ===
In 1955, Gaither was assigned as commander of the XVIII Airborne Corps.

From 1955 to 1956, Gaither served as the U.S. Army's assistant chief of staff for Intelligence, G-2, and was promoted to lieutenant general.

Gaither was deputy commander of the Continental Army Command from 1957 to 1958, with duty as commander of Army Reserve Forces.

From 1958 to 1960 Gaither was commander of the U.S. Army Caribbean Command. He became a hereditary member of the Maryland Society of the Cincinnati in 1960.

Gaither was assigned as commander of the Second United States Army in 1960, where he remained until his retirement in 1962.

== Retirement and awards ==
Gaither retired from the Army in 1962. His awards included two Army Distinguished Service Medals, two Silver Stars, the Legion of Merit and the Bronze Star Medal.

Gaither lived in semi-retirement in Annapolis, the state capital of Maryland along the Chesapeake Bay where he was commissioner of police for 8 years, from 1966 to 1973.

Gaither died of congestive heart failure on 26 October 1992, at the Fairfield Nursing Center in Annapolis, 19 years after retiring a second time from his 8 years leadership of the Annapolis Police Department as Police Commissioner.

Services were conducted at historic St. Anne's Episcopal Church, on Church Circle in the heart of Annapolis, followed by burial at the Arlington National Cemetery in Arlington, Virginia, across the Potomac River from Washington, D.C. He is interred at Section 2, Site 4888–1.
