= John C. Sjogren =

John Carleton Sjogren
- Born: August 19, 1916; Rockford, Michigan, United States
- Died: August 30, 1987 (aged 71); Rockford, Michigan, United States
- Burial place: Rockford Cemetery, Rockford, Michigan, United States
- Military career
- Allegiance: United States of America
- Branch: United States Army; Michigan National Guard
- Rank: First Lieutenant
- Units: Company I, 160th Infantry Regiment, 40th Infantry Division
- Conflicts: World War II; Korean War
- Awards: Medal of Honor

John Carleton Sjogren (August 19, 1916 – August 30, 1987) was an American soldier in the United States Army who received the Medal of Honor in World War II during the campaign to recapture the Philippines from Japanese forces in 1945. Against superior numbers, Sjogren was able to kill 43 enemy soldiers as well as destroying 9 pillboxes. He was the first of four soldiers from the 40th Division to receive the Medal. After the war, Sjogren served the Michigan National Guard from 1949 to 1953, where he rose to the rank of First Lieutenant and served in the Korean War before leaving the guard.

He is buried in Rockford Cemetery, Rockford, Michigan.

== Medal of Honor citation ==
Sjogren, John C.
Rank and organization: Staff Sergeant, Company I, 160th Infantry Regiment, 40th Infantry Division
Place and date: Near San Jose Hacienda, Negros, Philippine Islands, May 23, 1945
Entered service at: Rockford, Michigan
Citation:

He led an attack against a high precipitous ridge defended by a company of enemy riflemen, who were entrenched in spider holes and supported by well-sealed pillboxes housing automatic weapons with interlocking bands of fire. The terrain was such that only 1 squad could advance at one time; and from a knoll atop a ridge a pillbox covered the only approach with automatic fire. Against this enemy stronghold, S/Sgt. Sjogren led the first squad to open the assault. Deploying his men, he moved forward and was hurling grenades when he saw that his next in command, at the opposite flank, was gravely wounded. Without hesitation he crossed 20 yards of exposed terrain in the face of enemy fire and exploding dynamite charges, moved the man to cover and administered first aid. He then worked his way forward and, advancing directly into the enemy fire, killed 8 Japanese in spider holes guarding the approach to the pillbox. Crawling to within a few feet of the pillbox while his men concentrated their bullets on the fire port, he began dropping grenades through the narrow firing slit. The enemy immediately threw 2 or 3 of these unexploded grenades out, and fragments from one wounded him in the hand and back. However, by hurling grenades through the embrasure faster than the enemy could return them, he succeeded in destroying the occupants. Despite his wounds, he directed his squad to follow him in a systematic attack on the remaining positions, which he eliminated in like manner, taking tremendous risks, overcoming bitter resistance, and never hesitating in his relentless advance. To silence one of the pillboxes, he wrenched a light machinegun out through the embrasure as it was firing before blowing up the occupants with handgrenades. During this action, S/Sgt. Sjogren, by his heroic bravery, aggressiveness, and skill as a soldier, single-handedly killed 43 enemy soldiers and destroyed 9 pillboxes, thereby paving the way for his company's successful advance.

== Awards and Decorations ==

| Badge | Combat Infantryman Badge | | |
| 1st row | Medal of Honor | | |
| 2nd row | Bronze Star Medal Retroactively Awarded, 1947 | Purple Heart with 2 Oak leaf clusters | Army Good Conduct Medal |
| 3rd row | American Campaign Medal | Asiatic-Pacific Campaign Medal with Arrowhead Device and 3 Campaign stars | World War II Victory Medal |
| 4th row | National Defense Service Medal | Armed Forces Reserve Medal | Philippine Liberation Medal with 1 Campaign star |
| Unit awards | Presidential Unit Citation | | Philippine Presidential Unit Citation |

40th Infantry Division Insignia

== Other Honors ==
For his heroic act in the war the city of Rockford, Michigan had a day for him. They called it Sjogren day on the date of September 14. After serving the two wars he came home to live in peace. John lost his life to cancer.

== See also ==
- List of Medal of Honor recipients
