= 159th Infantry Regiment (United States) =

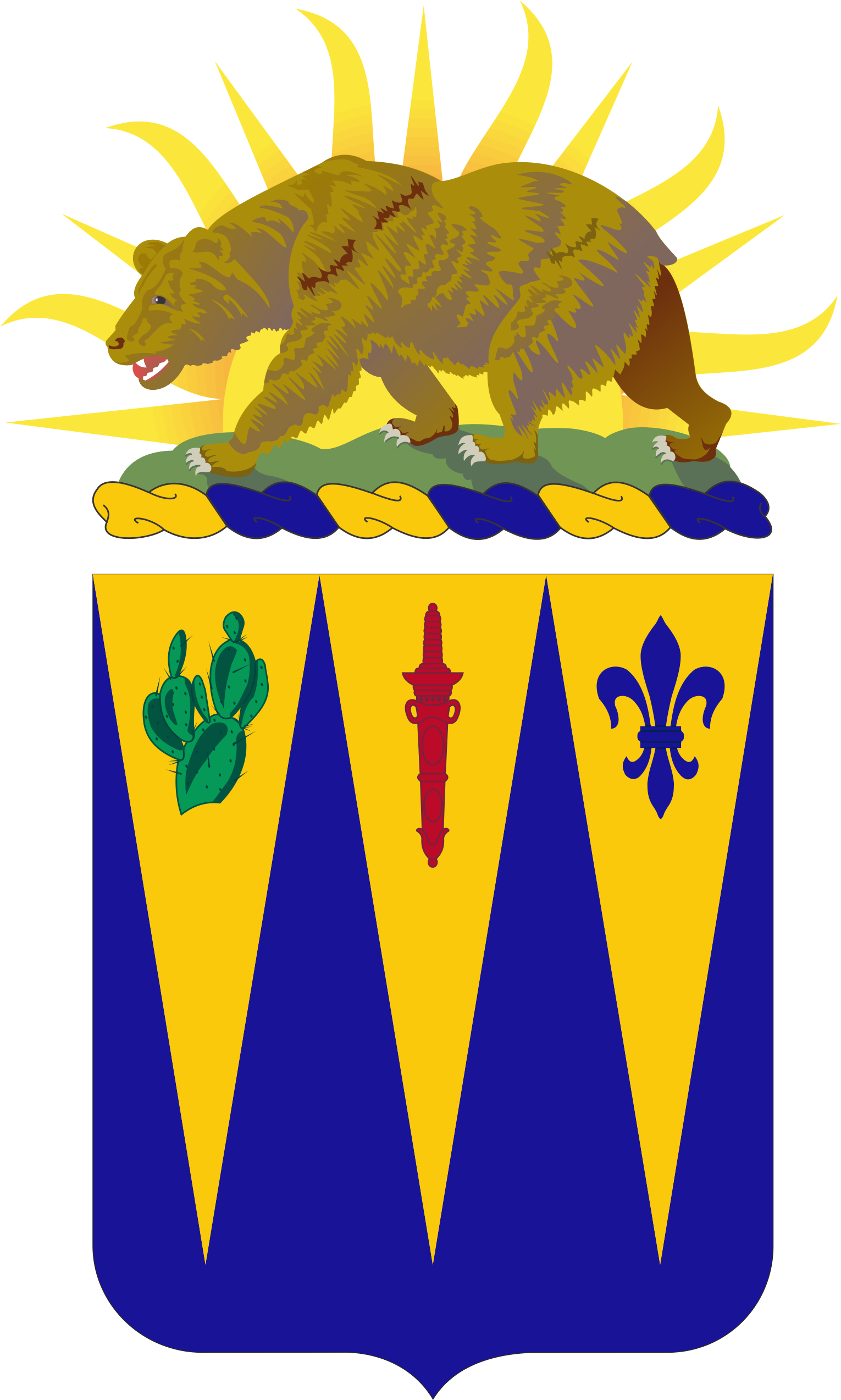
- Coat of arms
- Active: 1917–2000
- Country: United States
- Allegiance: California
- Branch: California Army National Guard
- Type: Infantry
- Role: Light Infantry
- Size: Regiment
- Nickname: Fifth California
- Motto: Unity for Service
- Engagements: World War I World War II

Insignia
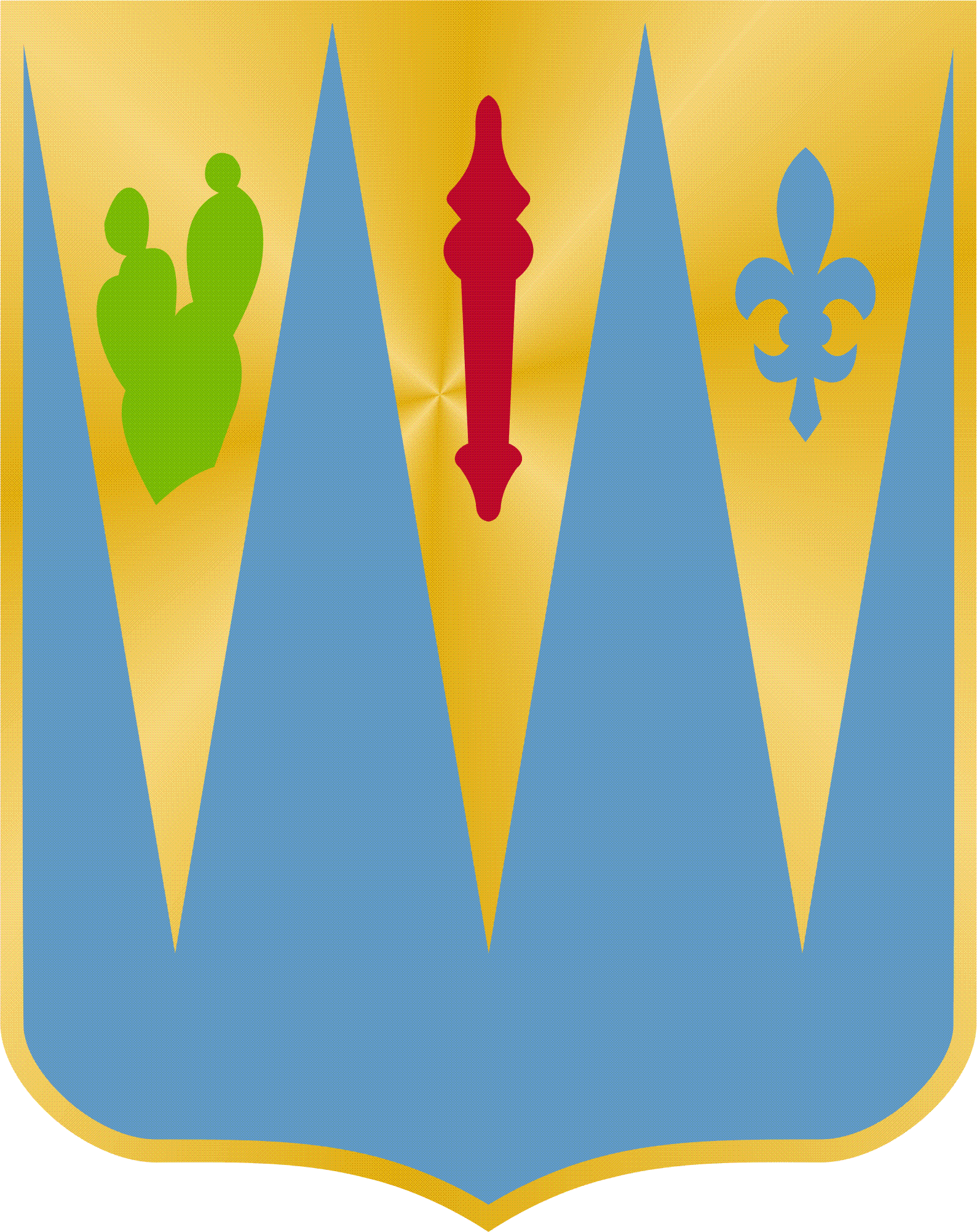
- Distinctive unit insignia

The 159th Infantry Regiment was an infantry regiment of the United States Army. It served as a part of the 40th Infantry Division for most of its history before deploying in World War II as a part of the 7th Infantry Division.

== History ==
The regiment traced its lineage to the 2nd Infantry Battalion of the California National Guard, organized on 12 December 1879 from existing companies.

=== Interwar period ===
The 159th Infantry arrived at the port of New York on 5 April 1919 on the troopship USS Edgar F. Luckenbach and was demobilized on 1 May 1919 at the Presidio of San Francisco, California. Per the National Defense Act of 1920, the 159th Infantry was reconstituted in the National Guard in 1921, assigned to the 40th Division, and allotted to the state of California. It was reorganized 1920–21 as seven separate companies of infantry in the California National Guard, and reorganized and redesignated on 2 October 1921 as the 159th Infantry. The regimental headquarters was organized on 14 June 1922 and federally recognized at Berkeley, California. The headquarters was relocated on 23 March 1931 to Oakland, California. The entire regiment was called up to perform riot control during the San Francisco street car workers’ strike, 5–21 July 1934. It conducted annual summer training at Del Monte, California, and Camp San Luis Obispo, California. The regiment was inducted into federal service on 3 March 1941 and moved to Camp San Luis Obispo, where it arrived on 14 March 1941.

On 1 July 1940, the 7th Infantry Division had been reactivated at Camp Ord, California, under the command of Major General Joseph W. Stilwell. The 7th Infantry Division was assigned to III Corps of the Fourth United States Army, and it was sent to Oregon for tactical maneuvers. Division units also practiced boat loading at the Monterey Wharf and amphibious assault techniques at the Salinas River in California.

The 159th Infantry was relieved from the 40th Division on 29 September 1941 and assigned to the 7th Infantry Division. It was reorganized and redesignated the 159th Infantry (Motorized) on 29 October 1941. Transferred 3 December 1941 to Fort Ord.

=== World War II ===
With the Japanese attack of Pearl Harbor, the division was sent to Camp San Luis Obispo to continue its training as a combat division.

For the early parts of the war, the division participated mainly in construction and training roles. On 9 April 1942, the division formally redesignated as the 7th Motorized Division. It began training in the Mojave Desert in preparation for deployment to the African theater. However, it was again designated the 7th Infantry Division on 1 January 1943, when the motorized equipment was removed from the unit and it became a light infantry division once more. It began rigorous amphibious assault training under Marines from the Fleet Marine Force, before being deployed to fight in the Pacific theater instead of Africa. General Holland Smith oversaw the unit's training.

==== Aleutian Islands ====
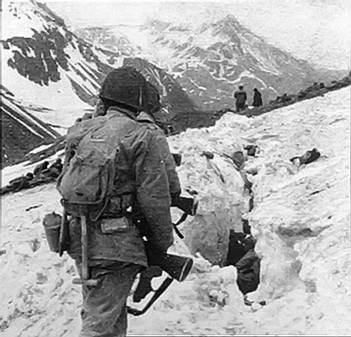
7th Infantry Division troops negotiate snow and ice during the battle on Attu in May 1943.

Elements of the 7th Infantry Division first saw combat in the amphibious assault on Attu Island, the westernmost Japanese entrenchment in the Aleutian Islands chain. Elements landed on 11 May 1943, spearheaded by the 17th Infantry Regiment, and fought an intense battle over the tundra against strong Japanese resistance. The fight for the island culminated in a battle at Chichagof Harbor, when the division destroyed all Japanese resistance on the island on 29 May, after a suicidal Japanese bayonet charge. During its first fight of the war, 600 soldiers of the division were killed, while killing 2,351 Japanese and taking 28 prisoners.

According to "Order of Battle: US Army World War II" by Shelby Stanton, the 159th was relieved from the 7th Infantry Division on 23 August 1943 and assigned to the Alaskan Department, and it departed Attu on 9 August 1944. Arriving at the Seattle Port of Embarkation eleven days later, it was transferred to Camp Swift, Texas on 28 August 1944. It moved to Camp Callan, California, on 20 December 1944 before returning to Camp Swift on 28 January 1945. The regiment staged at Camp Kilmer, New Jersey on 27 February 1945 before departing from the New York Port of Embarkation on 7 March 1945. It arrived in France eleven days later and was attached to the 106th Infantry Division to replace the two lost regiments the division lost during the Battle of The Bulge. As part of the 106th, it entered Germany on 25 April 1945. On 4 November 1945 it returned to the New York Port of Embarkation and was inactivated at Camp Shanks, New York on that same date.

=== Post-World War II ===
The 159th was reactivated in the post-war years and underwent several force reorganizations, including assignment as an element of the 49th Infantry Division and 49th Infantry Brigade. From January 1974 until January 1976 its 1st Battalion was part of the 40th Infantry Division; its 2nd Battalion was part of the 40th Infantry Division from January 1974 until October 2000. The 2nd Battalion, a longtime San Jose unit, was inactivated in 2000 and its elements were converted into subordinate units of the 49th Combat Support Command. The lineage of the battalion and the regiment itself was continued by the 980th Quartermaster Battalion of the command.

== Distinctive unit insignia ==
- Description

A Gold color metal and enamel device 1 3/32 inches (2.8 cm) in height overall consisting of a shield blazoned: Azure, three piles issuant Or, in chief a prickly pear cactus Vert, a sheathed Roman sword paleways, point to base, Gules, and a fleur-de-lis of the first. * Symbolism The shield is blue for Infantry. The three piles indicate that the organization has been in Federal service three times, and each pile is charged with a device representative of the service in which the organization has been engaged – Mexican Border service, Spanish War service and service in France during World War I.

- Background

The distinctive unit insignia was approved on 20 April 1927.

== Coat of arms ==
- Blazon
  - Shield- Azure, three piles issuant Or, in chief a prickly pear cactus Vert, a sheathed Roman sword paleways, point to base, Gules, and a fleur-de-lis of the first.
  - Crest- That for the regiments and separate battalions of the California Army National Guard: On a wreath of the colors Or and Azure, the setting sun behind a grizzly bear passant on a grassy field, all Proper. Motto: UNITY FOR SERVICE.
- Symbolism
  - Shield- The shield is blue for Infantry. The three piles indicate that the organization has been in Federal service three times, and each pile is charged with a device representative of the service in which the organization has been engaged – Mexican Border service, Spanish War service and service in France during World War I.
  - Crest- The crest is that of the California Army National Guard.
- Background- The coat of arms was approved on 20 April 1927.

== Sources ==
- Horner, David (2003). The Second World War, Vol. 1: The Pacific. Osprey Publishing. ISBN 978-0-415-96845-4.
- McGrath, John J. (2004). The Brigade: A History: Its Organization and Employment in the US Army. Combat Studies Institute Press. ISBN 978-1-4404-4915-4.
- Army Almanac: A Book of Facts Concerning the Army of the United States. United States Government Printing Office. 1959. ASIN B0006D8NKK.
