= Gray, Somerset County, Pennsylvania =

Unincorporated community in Pennsylvania, US

Gray, Pennsylvania
- Unincorporated community
- Location within Pennsylvania
- Coordinates: 40°08′09″N 79°05′34″W
- Country: United States
- State: Pennsylvania
- County: Somerset
- Elevation: 1,883 ft (574 m)
- Time zone: UTC-5 (Eastern (EST))
  - Summer (DST): UTC-4 (EDT)
- ZIP code: 15544
- Area code: 814
- GNIS feature ID: 1176019

Gray is an unincorporated community in Somerset County, Pennsylvania, United States. The community is located along Pennsylvania Route 985, 8.9 miles (14.3 km) north of Somerset. Gray has a post office, with ZIP code 15544.

== Demographics ==
Historical population
Census	Pop.	Note	%±

The United States Census Bureau defined Gray as a census designated place (CDP) in 2023.
