= 143rd Field Artillery Regiment =

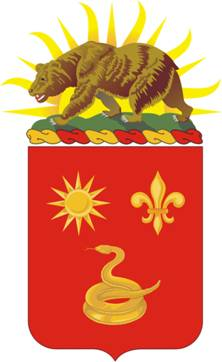
- 143rd Field Artillery Regiment coat of arms
- Active: 1912 – present
- Allegiance: United States of America
- Branch: United States Army
- Type: Field artillery
- Part of: 79th Infantry Brigade Combat Team
- Garrison/HQ: Richmond, California (HQ)
- Mottos: Facta Non Verba - Deeds Not Words
- Equipment: M119 howitzer and M777 howitzer
- Engagements: Spanish–American War; Philippine–American War; Mexican Expedition; World War I World War II; Korean War; Iraq Campaign
- Decorations: Presidential Unit Citation (Philippines); Presidential Unit Citation (Korea) Army Meritorious Unit Citation Army Superior Unit Citation

Commanders
- Current commander: LTC Jorge Reagan
- Previous commander: LTC Valos Owen
- 2d Previous commander: LTC Michael Leeney
- Notable commanders: LTC Rob Wooldridge; LTC E. Ian Falk; LTC Jim Kennedy; LTC Mike Sawyer

Insignia
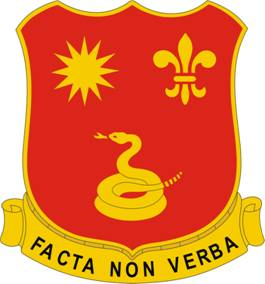
- Distinctive Unit Insignia

The 143rd Field Artillery Regiment is a combat arms regiment of the United States Army made up of soldiers from the California Army National Guard. Only the regiment's first battalion, a Composite fires battalion, equipped with M119A3 and M777A2 Howitzers, is still active. The 1st Battalion, 143rd Field Artillery's current mission is to shoot safely, accurately, and quickly in direct support of the 79th Infantry Brigade Combat Team. Furthermore, the battalion trains to deploy, fight, and win on the battlefield and respond effectively to any state emergency.

The first battalion was most recently activated for federal service in support of Operation Iraqi Freedom from 2007 to 2008. The subordinate batteries of 1-143 FA executed force protection missions throughout central and northern Iraq.

== Subordinate units ==
First Battalion, 143rd FAR The First Battalion, 143rd Field Artillery Regiment provides direct support fires to the 79th (formerly 40th) Infantry Brigade Combat Team, CAARNG. As the BCT's fires battalion, the 1-143rd FAR is organized to provide responsive and accurate artillery fires to the elements of the IBCT, including close supporting fires and counterfire.

Headquarters and Headquarters Battery (HHB)

HHB is headquartered in Richmond, CA and has a detachment in Los Angeles, CA. HHB consists of a battery headquarters, the battalion command section, S1, operations and intelligence platoon, communications platoon, S4, medical platoon, unit ministry team, a target acquisition platoon, and the Fire Support Detachment. The battery provides communications support and command and control for the fires battalion and subordinate, reinforcing, or attached units. The Fire Support Detachment provides observation and planning of Fires for the BCT. HHB moved from Walnut Creek, CA and Concord, CA to Richmond, CA in August 2012, and then re-organized and established its current detachment (Detachment 1) in Ventura, CA in February 2014. Detachment 1, HHB moved from Ventura, CA to Los Angeles, CA in November 2016.

Alpha Battery

Alpha Battery is stationed at Lodi, CA, and is equipped with the M119A3 Howitzer. Though battery designation has changed through the years, there has been an artillery battery in Lodi since before World War II

Bravo Battery

Bravo Battery is stationed at Ventura, CA and has a detachment in Fresno, CA. Bravo is organized identically to Alpha battery and consists of a battery headquarters, two firing platoons, a supply section, and two ammunition sections. Each firing platoon consists of three howitzer sections, a platoon headquarters section, and platoon operations center composed of fire direction center section personnel.

Charlie Battery

Charlie Battery is stationed at Bakersfield, CA. Charlie is equipped with M777A2 Howitzers, but is organized identically to Alpha and Bravo Batteries, with a battery headquarters, two firing platoons, a supply section, and two ammunition sections. Each firing platoon consists of three howitzer sections, a platoon headquarters section, and platoon operations center composed of fire direction center section personnel.

Foxtrot Company, 40th BSB

Foxtrot Company, based in Walnut Creek, CA with a detachment in nearby Concord, CA, is the 1-143 FA's forward support company (FSC). The forward support company is organic to the 79th Brigade Support Battalion and assigned to the 1-143 FA. The forward support company provides field maintenance, subsistence (Class I), and supply distribution for the battalion. The forward support company consists of a company headquarters, a field feeding section, a field maintenance platoon, and a distribution platoon. Foxtrot Company moved from Richmond, CA to Walnut Creek, CA and Concord, CA in August 2012, and was re-designated from Golf Company, 40th BSB to Foxtrot Company, 40th BSB in February 2014.

== History ==
Service Battery, 1-143 FA (now F Co, 40th BSB) based in Walnut Creek, CA, traces its lineage to Battery A, First Battalion of California Heavy Artillery. Battery A mustered into federal service in San Francisco between 6 and 11 May 1898, along with the rest of the battalion. A and D Batteries of the battalion sailed to the Philippines, participating in the Spanish–American War and the Philippine–American War. Following service in those two conflicts, A Battery was mustered out of federal service in San Francisco on 21 September 1899. The regiment was originally organized as the 1st Battalion of California Field Artillery on 20 December 1912 from existing units in the California National Guard, with headquarters at Oakland. The 1st Battalion was called into service on 18 June 1916, at their home station, and mustered into federal service on 28 June 1916 at the Sacramento Fairgrounds as part of the 1st California Brigade [National Guard]. The 1st Battalion of California Field Artillery, along with other units of the 1st California Brigade, served during the Mexican Border Campaign at Nogales and Yuma, Arizona. The unit was tasked with protecting the border and railroads as other units patrolled the vast border that separated the United States and Mexico. Film star Mary Pickford adopted the regiment in World War I, and the 143rd appears as extras in her 1918 war film, Johanna Enlists.

The regiment's units earned the following Campaign Participation Credit:

Spanish–American War
Philippine–American War
Mexican Expedition
World War I
World War II
Korean War
Operation Enduring Freedom JTF-GTMO
Operation Iraqi Freedom
Operation Enduring Freedom/Operation Spartan Shield (Area Support Group – Qatar)

The regiment has contributed forces to the following state mobilizations:

Folsom State Prison Riots 1927
Los Angeles Riots 1992
2002-2004 Golden Gate Bridge Security
Airport Security 2006
California Wildfires 2007
California Wildfires 2008
California Wildfires 2015
California Wildfires 2016
JTF Rattlesnake 2019
Eden Wildfires 2025
No Kings Riots 2025
