= 223rd Infantry Regiment =

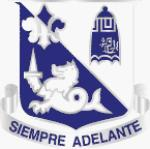
- Allegiance: United States
- Branch: United States Army
- Type: Infantry
- Size: Regiment
- Engagements: Korean War

Commanders
- Notable commanders: Curtis J. Herrick; Louis W. Truman; John W. Keating

The 223rd Infantry Regiment is a regiment of the United States Army. The regiment was part of the California Army National Guard, and had Soldiers from the Los Angeles metropolitan area. Three members of the 223rd Infantry Regiment were awarded the Medal of Honor for their actions during the Korean War: David B. Bleak, Gilbert G. Collier and Clifton T. Speicher.

== History ==
Lineage of the regiment can trace back to 1885, with the formation of the 7th Infantry Battalion of the California National Guard; this unit served briefly during the Spanish–American War, and was later briefly activated to serve at the Mexican Border at Nogales, Arizona in 1917. With the entry of the United States into The Great War, 7th Infantry Battalion and elements of the 2nd Infantry Battalion of the California National Guard, were organized into the 160th Infantry Regiment, a part of the 40th Division. In 1929, 2nd Battalion, 160th Infantry Regiment, became part of the 185th Infantry Regiment, keeping its battalion designation. The 185th Infantry Regiment would go on to serve with the 40th Infantry Division during World War II, completing the war in Korea as part of the American occupation force. In 1946, 2nd Battalion, 185th Infantry Regiment, became the 223rd Infantry Regiment.
