= 224th Division =

224th Division may refer to:

- 224th Coastal Division, Italy
- 224th Division (Imperial Japanese Army)
- 224th Rifle Division, Soviet Union

== See also ==
- List of military divisions by number
- 224th Brigade (disambiguation)
- 224th Regiment (disambiguation)
- 224th (disambiguation)
