= Joint Forces Training Base – Los Alamitos =

Military airbase in Los Alamitos, California, USA

- JFTB
- Los Alamitos, California, in United States
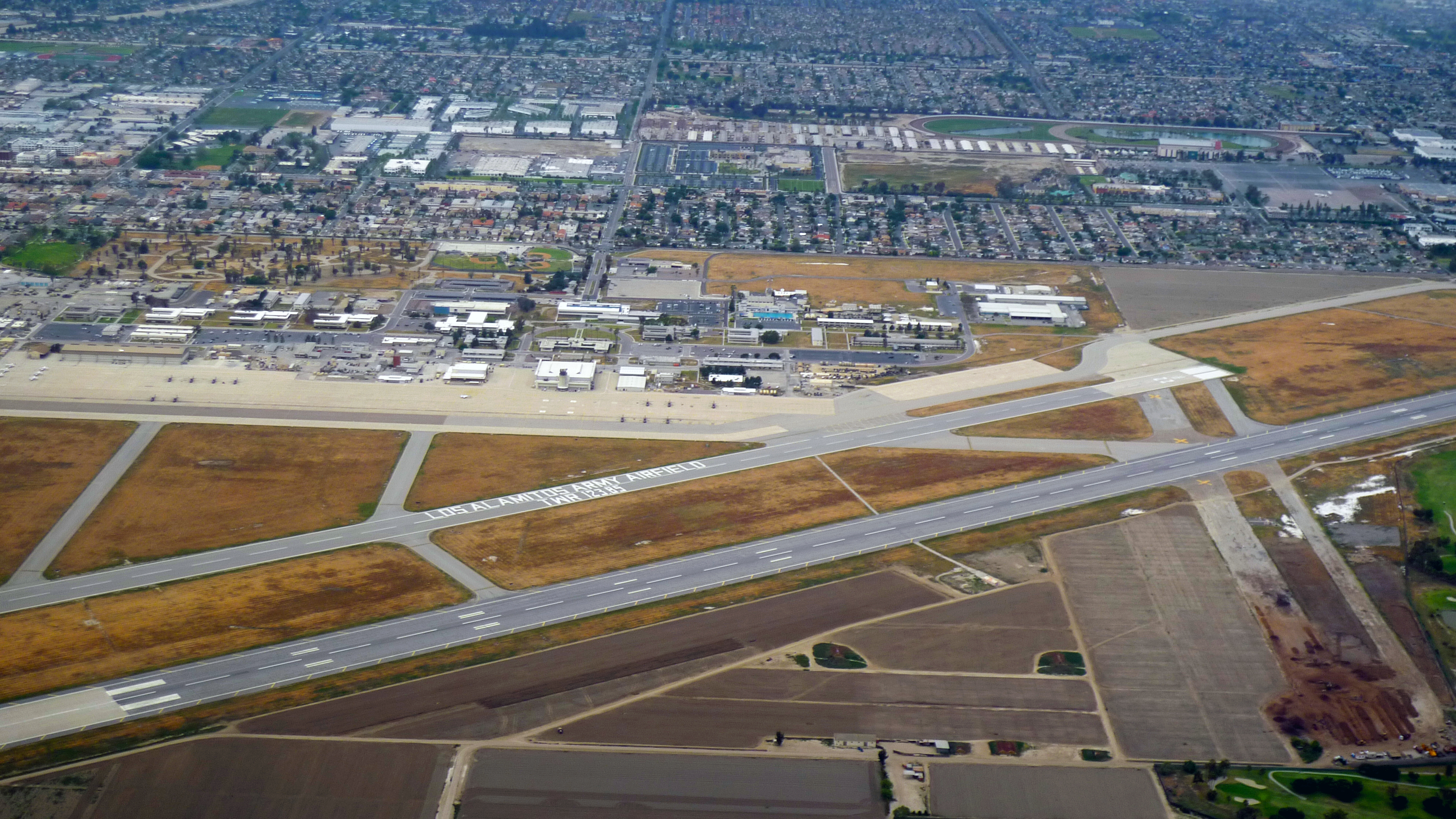
- An aerial view of JFTB Los Alamitos during 2015

Site information
- Type: Joint forces training base
- Owner: Department of Defense
- Operator: US Army
- Controlled by: California National Guard
- Condition: Operational
- Website: Official website

Location
- Location in the United States
- Coordinates: 33°47′24″N 118°03′05″W

Site history
- Built: 1942 (as NAS Los Alamitos)
- In use: 1942 – 1973 (US Navy); 1973 – present (US Army)

Garrison information
- Current commander: Lieutenant Colonel Manju Vig

Airfield information
- Identifiers: ICAO: KSLI, FAA LID: SLI
- Elevation: 10.8 metres (35 ft) AMSL
Runways
Direction	Length and surface
4R/22L	2,439 metres (8,002 ft) Asphalt/concrete
4L/22R	1,799 metres (5,902 ft) Porous European Mix
- Other facilities: Anderson Drop Zone

Joint Forces Training Base – Los Alamitos is a joint base in Los Alamitos, California, United States. Formerly operated as a Naval Air Station, the base contains the Los Alamitos Army Airfield and is sometimes called by that name. The base is also known as JFTB – Los Al or just JFTB. The base covers 1,319 acres and "supports 850 full-time employees and more than 6,000 National Guard and Reserve troops."

== Facilities ==
JFTB has an MWR with billeting, a pub, and a banquet hall. Fiddler's Green is the last remaining military pub in Orange County.

JFTB has significant training facilities, including an Engagement Skills Trainer, a Virtual Convoy Operations Trainer, a HMMWV Egress Assistance Trainer, a Laser Marksmanship Training System, and a Close Combat Tactical Trainer.

=== Los Alamitos Army Airfield ===
The airfield has two runways:

- Runway 4L/22R: 5,902 × 150 ft. (1,799 x 46 m), surface: PEM
- Runway 4R/22L: 8,001 × 200 ft. (2,439 x 61 m), surface: asphalt/concrete

The airfield is home to Company A, 1st Battalion (Assault), 140th Aviation Regiment.

=== Aquatics Training Center ===
The JFTB Aquatics Training Center is an Olympic-size swimming pool 50 m by 25 m, which offers year-round lap swimming, swim lessons, and fitness classes. The women's national water polo team regularly practices at the facility.

== History ==
In 1942, the current JFTB was established as Naval Air Reserve Base Los Alamitos, providing advanced training for U.S. Navy and U.S. Marine Corps fighter pilot in addition to hosting units from nearby Naval Air Station Terminal Island/Reeves Field in San Pedro. The following year, it was renamed Naval Air Station Los Alamitos and began supporting fleet carrier air groups. In the post-World War II war period, its focus changed to support of Naval Air Reserve units following the release from active duty of many Naval Aviators, enlisted Naval Aircrewmen, and support personnel and their subsequent affiliation in the Naval Reserve. The air station continued this mission through the early years of the Cold War into the Korean War and the Vietnam War.

On 16 July 1957, then-Major John H. Glenn Jr., USMC, set a transcontinental air speed record, flying a F8U-1P Crusader from NAS Los Alamitos to NAS Floyd Bennett Field, New York, in 3 hours, 23 minutes, and 8.4 seconds. Project Bullet, as the mission was called, provided both the first transcontinental flight to average supersonic speed, and the first continuous transcontinental panoramic photograph of the United States. Glenn was awarded his fifth Distinguished Flying Cross for the mission.

Prior to 1970, all Naval Air Reserve aircraft belonged to the local Naval Air Reserve Training Unit (NARTU), in this case NARTU Los Alamitos, or to those naval air stations under Naval Air Reserve control. Except for those squadrons recalled to active duty, as was the case during the Korean War, no Naval Reserve aviation squadrons "owned" their aircraft, as the aircraft were assigned to the NARTU or naval air station. From the end of World War II until 1956, aircraft assigned to NARTU Los Alamitos carried to the tail code "L" on their vertical stabilizer or empennage. This tail code was changed to "7L" in 1956 and continued until 1970. In 1970, during the reorganization of the Naval Air Reserve into the "Reserve Force" concept, each new squadron was made independent of the NARTU and assigned to either a concurrently established Reserve carrier air wing or a shore-based air wing, paralleling its active duty Navy counterparts. Following this reorganization, most Naval Air Reserve units at NAS Los Alamitos relocated to active duty fleet naval air stations in California, most operating the same type of aircraft such as NAS Miramar, NAS North Island, NAS Point Mugu, NAS Lemoore, and NAS Alameda.

In 1972, several California Army National Guard and U.S. Army Reserve aviation assets transferred to NAS Los Alamitos, resulting in yet another name change to Naval Air Station Los Alamitos Armed Forces Reserve Center. This was followed in 1973 by the California Army National Guard taking operational control of the airfield from the U.S. Navy and naming the installation Los Alamitos Army Airfield. The remainder of the base came under California Army National Guard control in 1977 and the current name of Joint Forces Training Base - Los Alamitos (JFTB), was adapted in 2000 to reflect its multiple uses by the California Army National Guard, California Air National Guard, the U.S. Army Reserve, and other federal reserve component units.

The senior command on post is the 40th Infantry Division (Mechanized), headquartered in the large, prominent building facing the flagpole and main entrance artery.

The base served as the starting line for the 14th season of the hit CBS reality TV show The Amazing Race. The base's status as an alternative landing area for Air Force One was mentioned in an episode of The West Wing.

The base leases the airfield to the City of Los Alamitos's for the annual Southland Credit Union Los Alamitos "Race on the Base", a charity event including a 5K Run, 5K Walk, 10K Run, 10K Skate/ Handcycle / Wheelchair, Mission: 1K Kids Run Jr. Reverse Triathlon and Reverse Triathlon. This is the largest reverse triathlon event in the country.

On the south edge of Runway 22L is the Navy Golf Course, where Tiger Woods honed his game as a youth. The 18-hole Destroyer Course opened in 1966 and an executive nine holes was later added. The former military-only facility opened for public play in 2004.

In 2014, President Barack Obama landed at Los Alamitos Army Airfield in Air Force One in order to give the commencement speech at UC Irvine.

In April 2015, Brig Gen Nathaniel S. Reddicks became the first installation commander from the California Air National Guard. After this command, Reddicks retired from federal service and joined the California State Military Reserve, "making him the first federally recognized general officer to join the CSMR since the Korean War."

In October 2016, Brig. Gen. John W. Lathrop took command of the base.

== Gallery ==
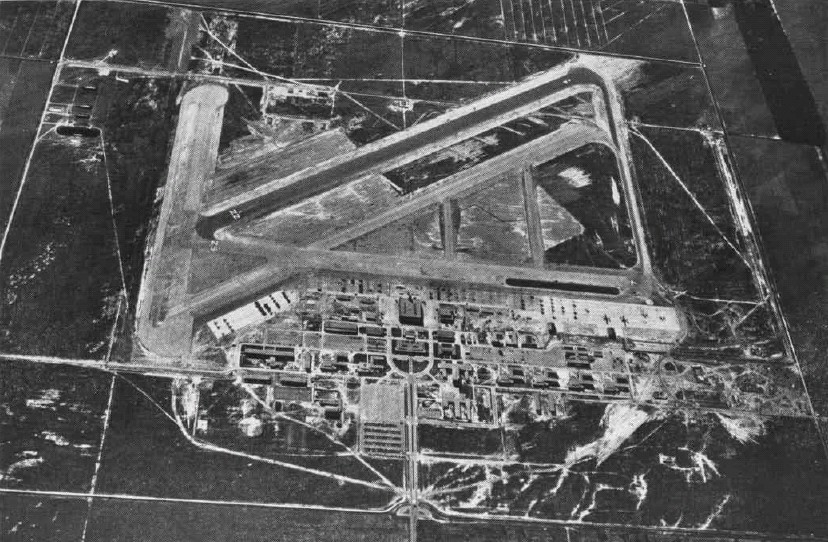
NAS Los Alamitos in the mid-1940s

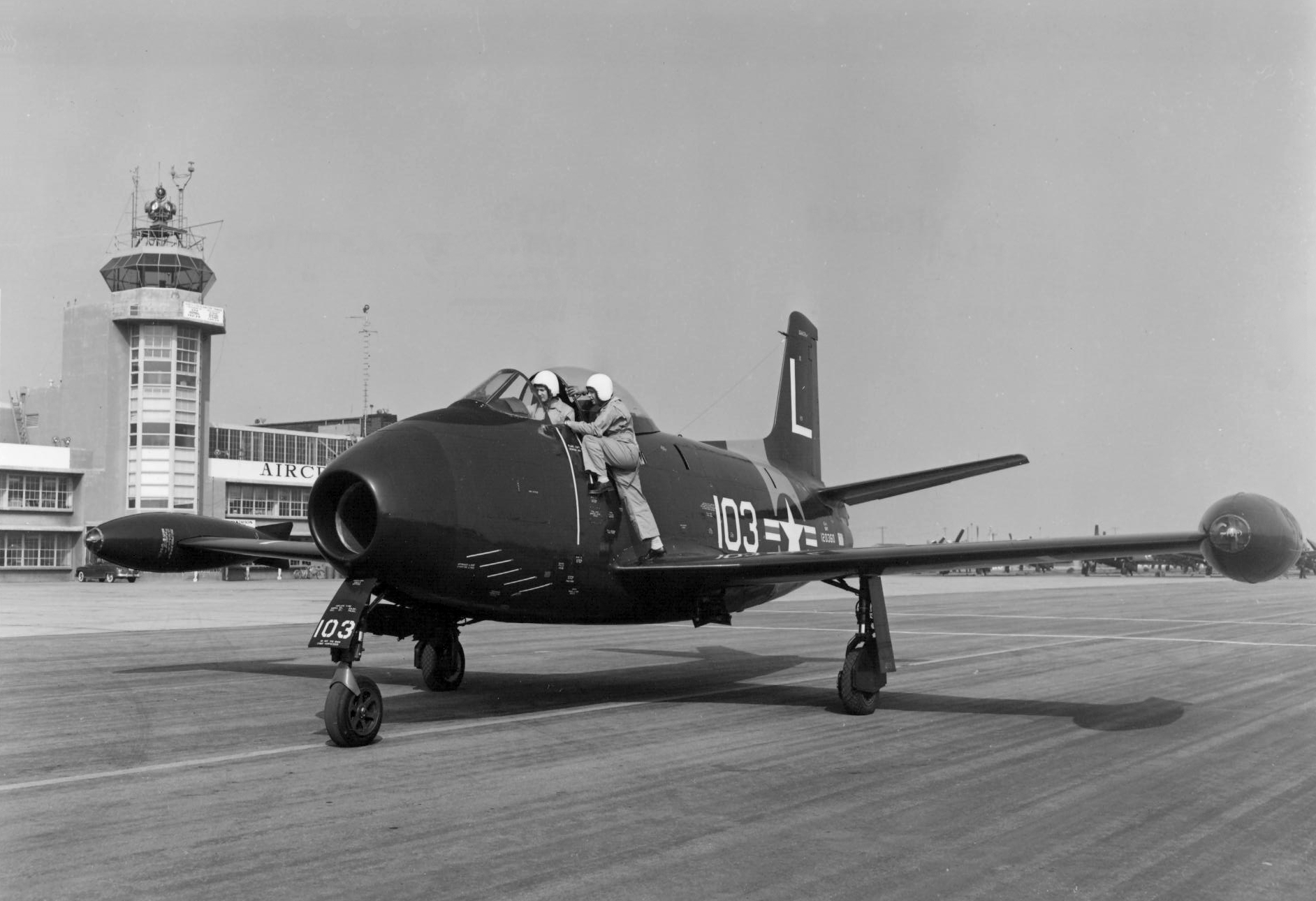
Naval Reserve North American FJ-1 Fury at NAS Los Alamitos, circa 1950

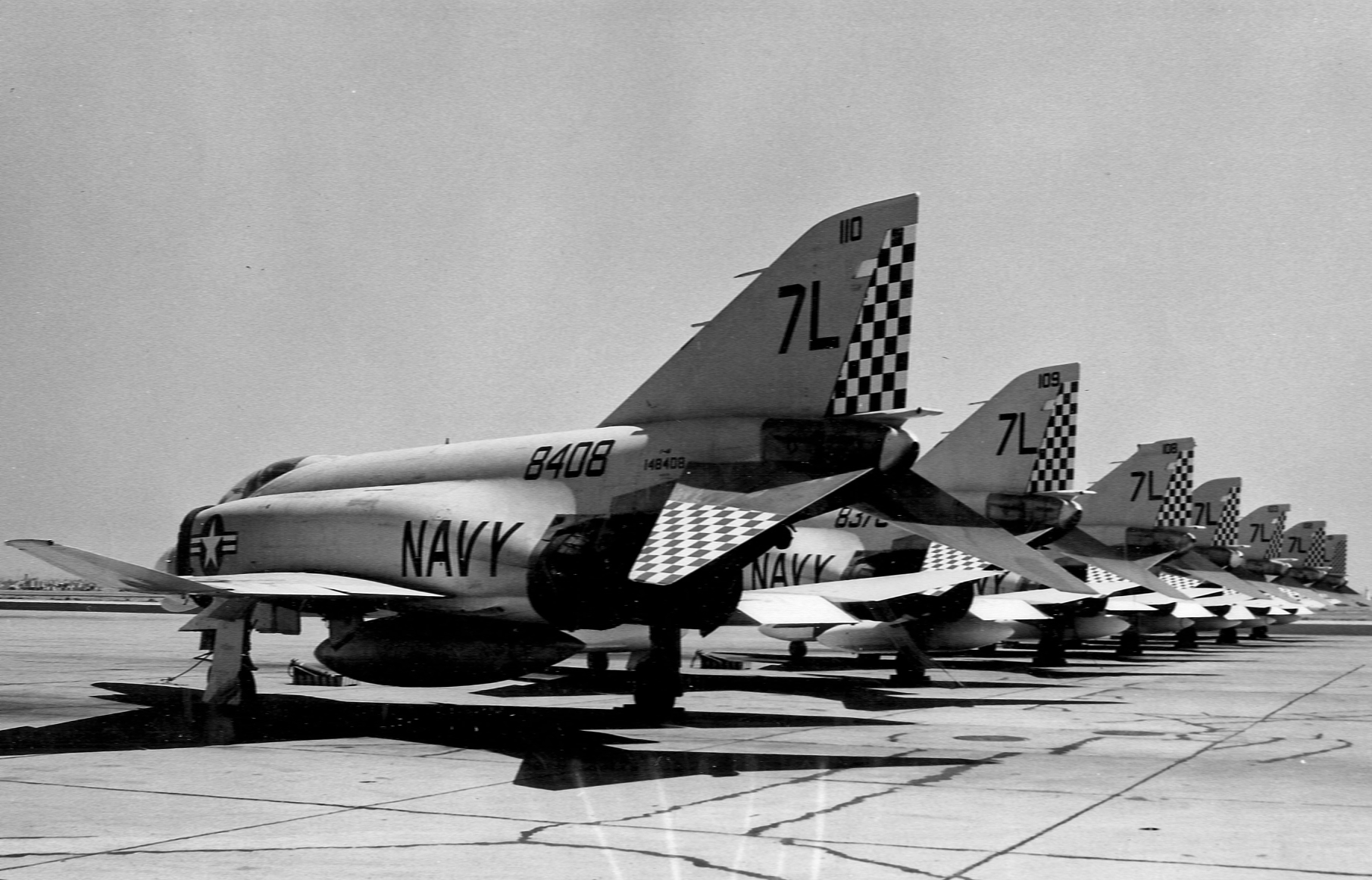
Naval Air Reserve McDonnell Douglas F-4 Phantom IIs of VF-22L1 at NAS Los Alamitos, 1970. VF-22L1 personnel would later merge into VF-301 and VF-302 at NAS Miramar in 1970 and 1971.

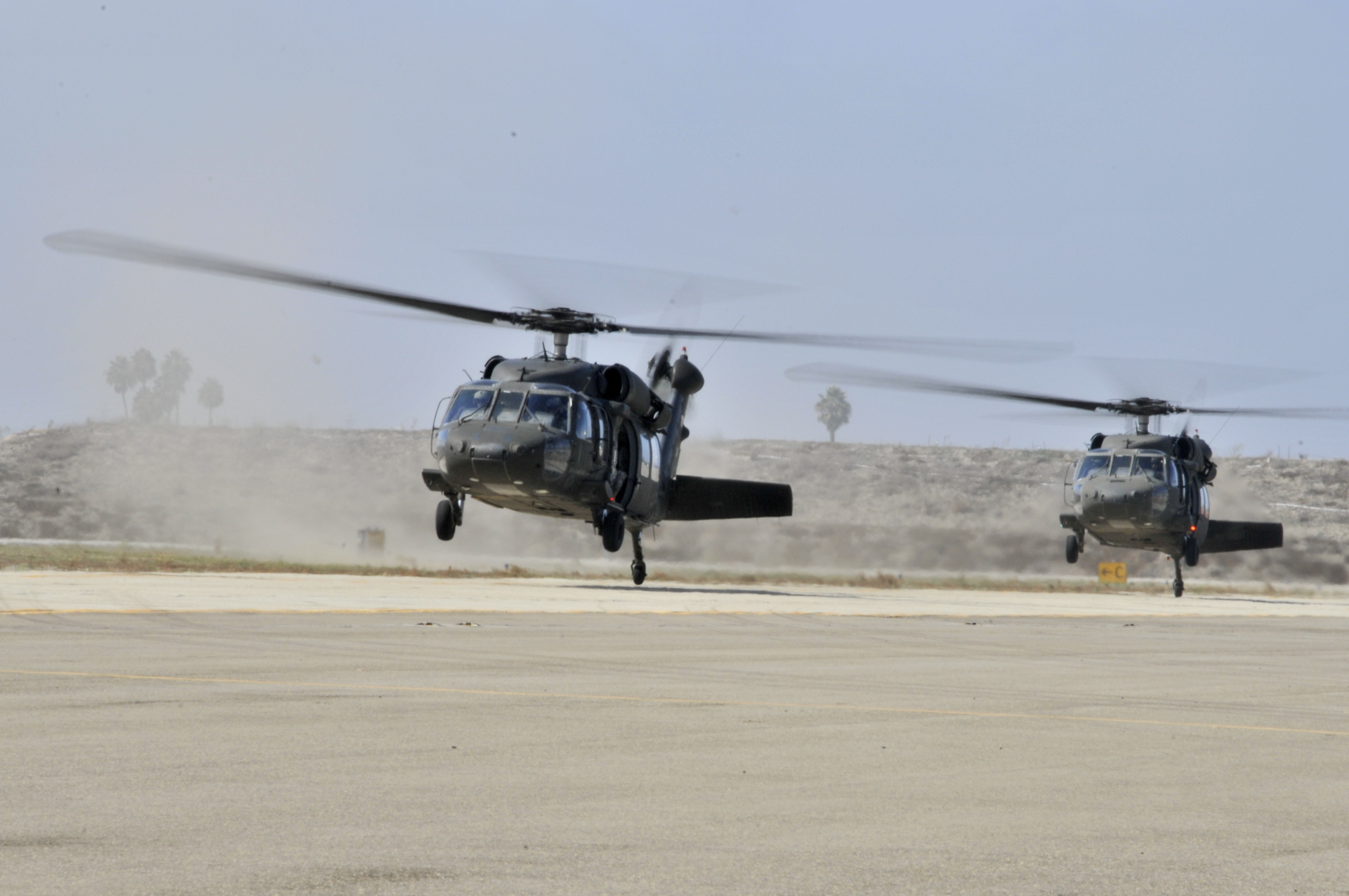
Sikorsky UH-60 Blackhawks participating in California National Guard Best Warrior Competition at JFTB Los Alamitos, 2011

== See also ==
- Naval Air Station Los Alamitos Naval Outlying Landing Fields during World War II
