= 224th Regiment =

224th Regiment may refer to:

- 224th Aviation Regiment, United States
- 224th Infantry Regiment, United States

== See also ==
- 224th Brigade (disambiguation)
