= Camp Roberts =

Camp Roberts can refer to:

- Camp Roberts, California
- Camp Roberts, a small camp within Kandahar International Airport
