= 115th Regional Support Group =

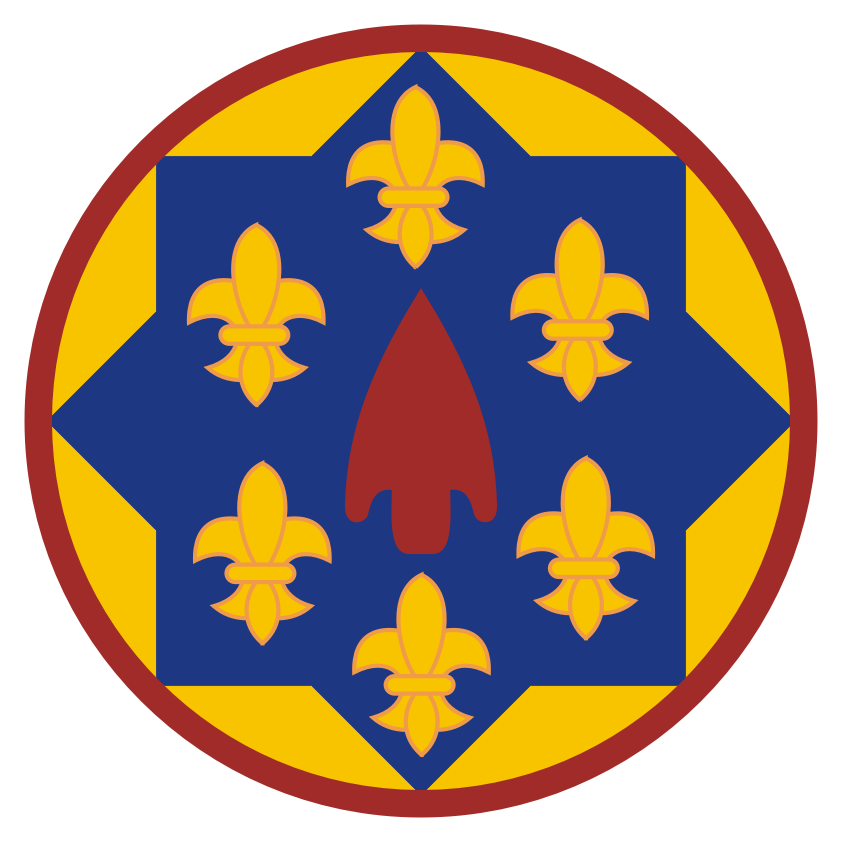
- Active: 1968 - present
- Country: United States
- Branch: United States Army National Guard
- Type: Support
- Size: Group (Brigade)
- Part of: California Army National Guard
- Garrison/HQ: Roseville, California
- Motto: Support Strength Success

Commanders
- Current commander: Col. Karstan Jack
- Command Sergeant Major: CSM Alfredo Juarez

Insignia
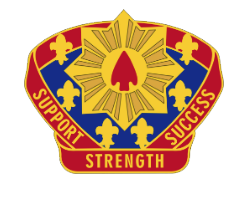
- 115th Regional Support Group DUI

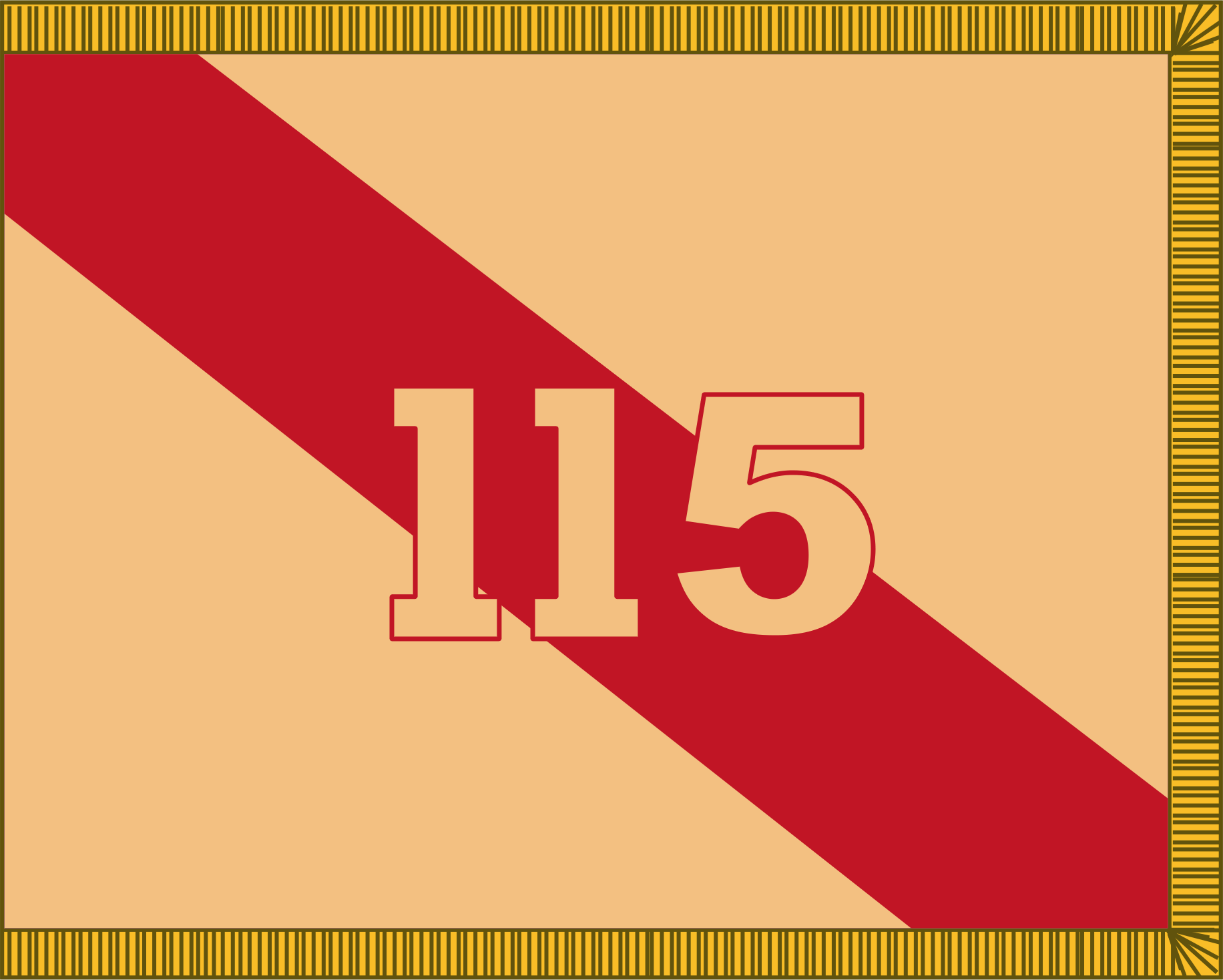
- 115th Regional Support Group Flag

The 115th Regional Support Group (115 RSG) is a unit of the California National Guard since it was created as the 115th General Support Group in January 1968. The unit was redesignated the 115th Support Group (Area) in 1975. The unit bears the lineage of the 749th Maintenance Battalion and the 149th Armor along with their battle streamers from World Wars I and II. The unit also responded to the 1989 San Francisco Earthquake, Kosovo Force, Operations Desert Shield and Desert Storm supporting VII Corps, COVID-19 deployment, summer wildfire suppression and supporting local humanitarian efforts in California.

== Subordinate Units ==
- 115th Regional Support Group (CA ARNG) Roseville Armory
- Headquarters and Headquarters Detachment
- 749th Combat Sustainment Support Battalion, Benicia Armory
- Headquarters and Headquarters Company
- 349th Quartermaster Company, Vallejo Armory
  - 2632nd Transportation Company San Bruno Armory
  - 2668th Transportation Company Oroville Armory
  - 297th Medical Company. San Mateo Armory
- 340th Brigade Support Battalion Seaside Armory
  - Headquarters and Headquarters Company
  - Company A
  - Company B. Atascadero Armory
  - 1040th Quartermaster Company Merced Armory
