= 224th Brigade =

224th Brigade may refer to:

- 224th Mixed Brigade (Spain)
- 224th Brigade (United Kingdom)
- 224th Sustainment Brigade, United States

== See also ==
- 224th Regiment (disambiguation)
- 224th (disambiguation)
