= 132nd Engineer Battalion =

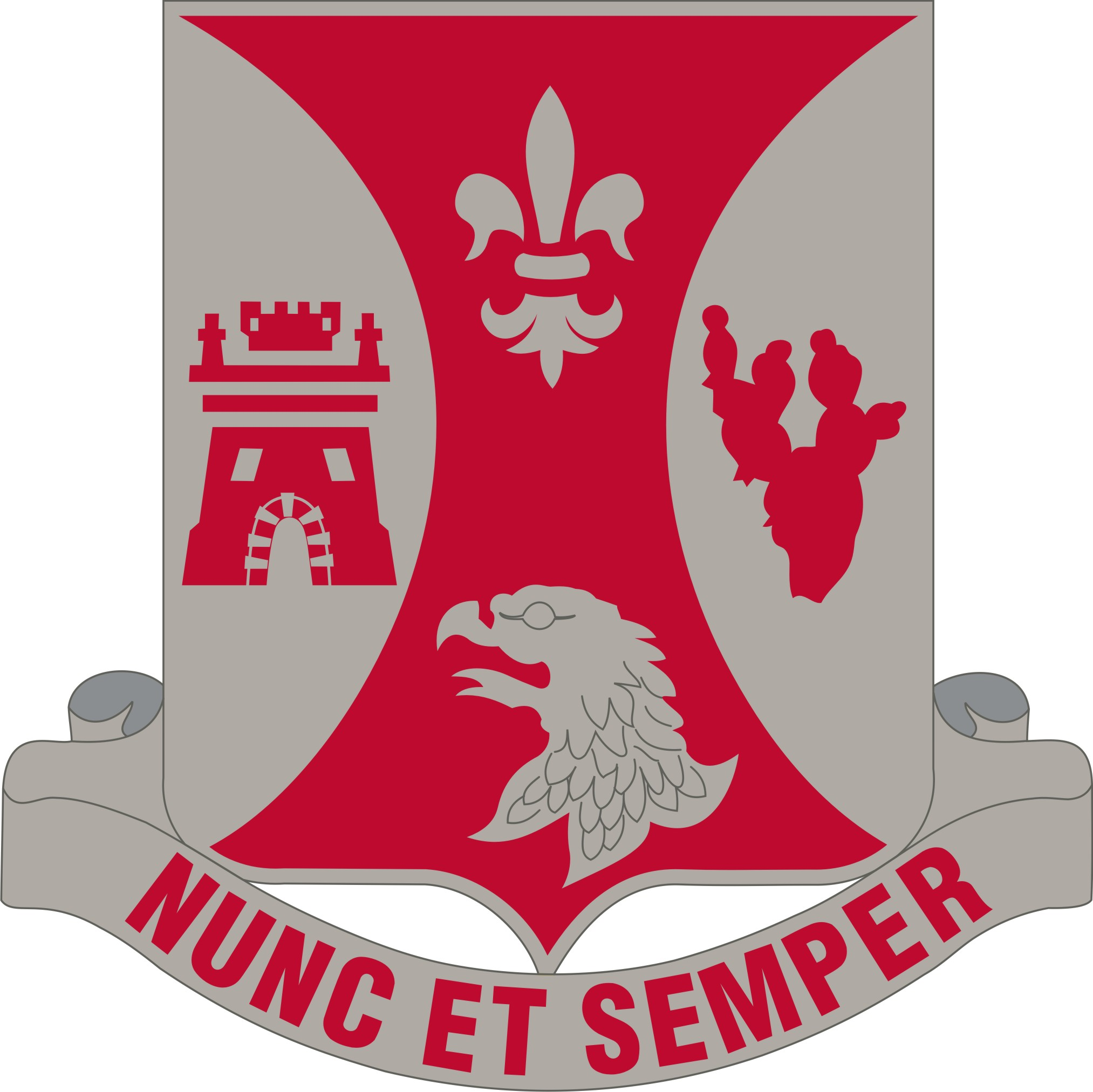
- Distinctive unit insignia
- Active: 1943-46; 1974-2004
- Disbanded: 1 September 2004
- Country: United States
- Branch: California Army National Guard
- Type: Engineer
- Motto(s): Aedificamus Ducimus (We Build, We Lead)

The 132nd Engineer Battalion is an engineer battalion of the United States Army. It has been formed twice, once associated with the lineage of the 196th Infantry Regiment in 1942–46, and thirty years later, in the California National Guard. Officially, due to the lineage system of the United States Army, neither unit formed under this designation is associated with the other.

In 1942, the 1st Battalion, 196th Infantry Regiment, was relieved from assignment from the 34th Infantry Division (United States) and redesignated as 1st Battalion, 132d Engineers (Combat) 1 February 1942. Redesignated 1st Battalion, 132d Engineer Combat Regiment 1 August 1942. Reorganized and redesignated 5 April 1943 at Framingham, Massachusetts as the 132d Engineer Combat Battalion. The battalion was inactivated 31 January 1946 at Matsayama, Japan.

The 132nd Engineer Battalion was again constituted on 28 December 1973 in the California Army National Guard and assigned to the 40th Infantry Division.

It organized on 13 January 1974 from new and existing units with headquarters at San Francisco. Its headquarters relocated on 1 November 1976 to Sacramento.

The unit was ordered into active federal service on 1 May 1992 at home stations; released on 9 May 1992 from active federal service and reverted to state control. The unit was deactivated on 1 September 2004 at Sacramento, California.

== Distinctive unit insignia (1977 to 2004) ==
Description

"A Silver color metal and enamel device 1 1/8 inches (2.9 cm) in height overall consisting of a shield blazoned: Argent a fess Vert charged with an arrowhead of the field in chief a Lorraine cross and in base two fleurs-de-lis fesswise Azure all between flaunches Gules each charged with an arrowhead of the first. Attached below and to the sides of the shield a Silver scroll inscribed "AEDIFICAMUS DUCIMUS" in Red letters.

Symbolism

Scarlet and white (silver) are the colors used for the Corps of Engineers. The Lorraine cross and fleurs-de-lis refer to France where an element of the organization participated in six campaigns of World War I. Two fleurs-de-lis are used to allude to World War II when elements of the organization participated in two theaters, the European-African-Middle East and Asiatic-Pacific. The arrowheads are separate to denote element participation in three assault landings: Algeria-French Morocco, Eastern Mandates and Leyte. The colors blue, white and red represent the Philippine Presidential Unit Citation awarded the unit. The colors white, blue, red and green represent the Republic of Korea Presidential Unit Citation. The motto translates to "We Build We Lead."

== Campaign participation credit (California 1974 onwards) ==
=== Headquarters Company (Sacramento) ===
- World War I
  - Silver band without inscription
- World War II
  - Aleutian Islands Campaign
  - Eastern Mandates Campaign (with arrowhead)
  - Leyte Campaign (with arrowhead)
  - Ryukyus

=== Company B ===
- World War I
  - Champagne-Marne
  - Aisne-Marne
  - St. Mihiel
  - Meuse-Argonne
  - Lorraine 1918
  - Champagne 1918
- World War II
  - Algeria-French Morocco Campaign (with arrowhead)
  - Sicily Campaign
  - Rome-Arno Campaign
  - Southern France Campaign
  - Rhineland Campaign
  - Ardennes-Alsace Campaign
  - Central Europe Campaign
- Korean War
  - Second Korean Winter
  - Korea, Summer-Fall 1952
  - Third Korean Winter
  - Korea, Summer 1953

== Decorations (California) ==
=== Headquarters Company (Sacramento) ===
- Philippine Presidential Unit Citation, Streamer embroidered 17 OCTOBER 1944 TO 4 JULY 1945
- Republic of Korea Presidential Unit Citation, Streamer embroidered KOREA 1945–1946

=== Company B ===
- Republic of Korea Presidential Unit Citation, Streamer embroidered KOREA 1952–1954
