= California Army National Guard =

Land force component of the California National Guard

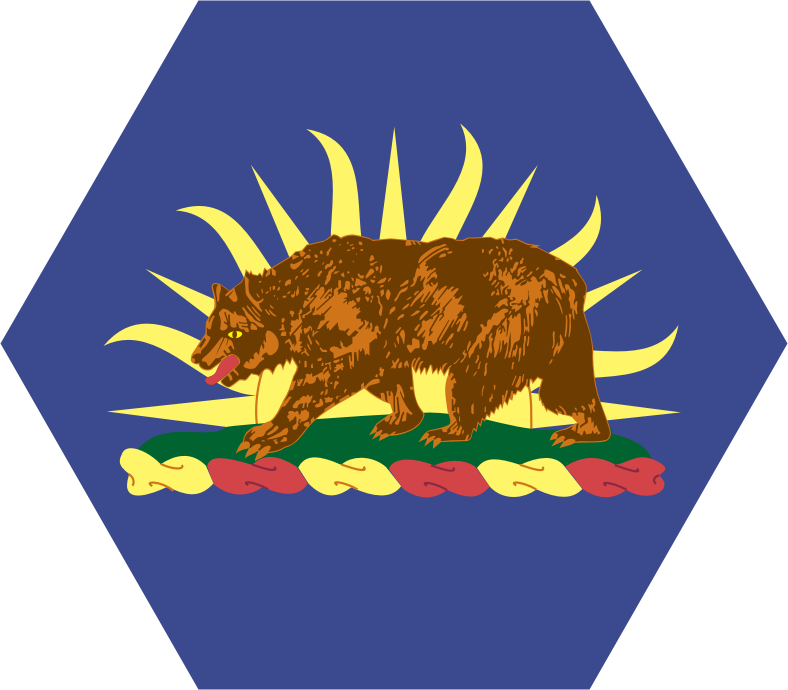
- California Army National Guard Element, Joint Forces Headquarters Shoulder Sleeve Insignia
- Founded: 27 July 1849
- Country: United States
- Allegiance: California
- Branch: Army National Guard; California Military Department
- Type: Organized militia reserve force
- Role: "To organize, train, equip, and resource community based land forces to support state and/or federal authority"
- Size: 18,450
- Garrison/HQ: 9800 Goethe Road, Sacramento, CA 95826
- Nicknames: Army Guard; CalGuard
- Mottos: "Always Ready, Always There!"
- Website: https://nationalguard.com/california

Commanders
- Commander: BG Jeffrey D. Smiley (Commander, CA ARNG)
- CCWO: CW5 Benjamin Burnett (Command Chief Warrant Officer, CA ARNG)
- CSM: CSM Joe Derma III (Command Sergeant Major, CA ARNG)

Insignia
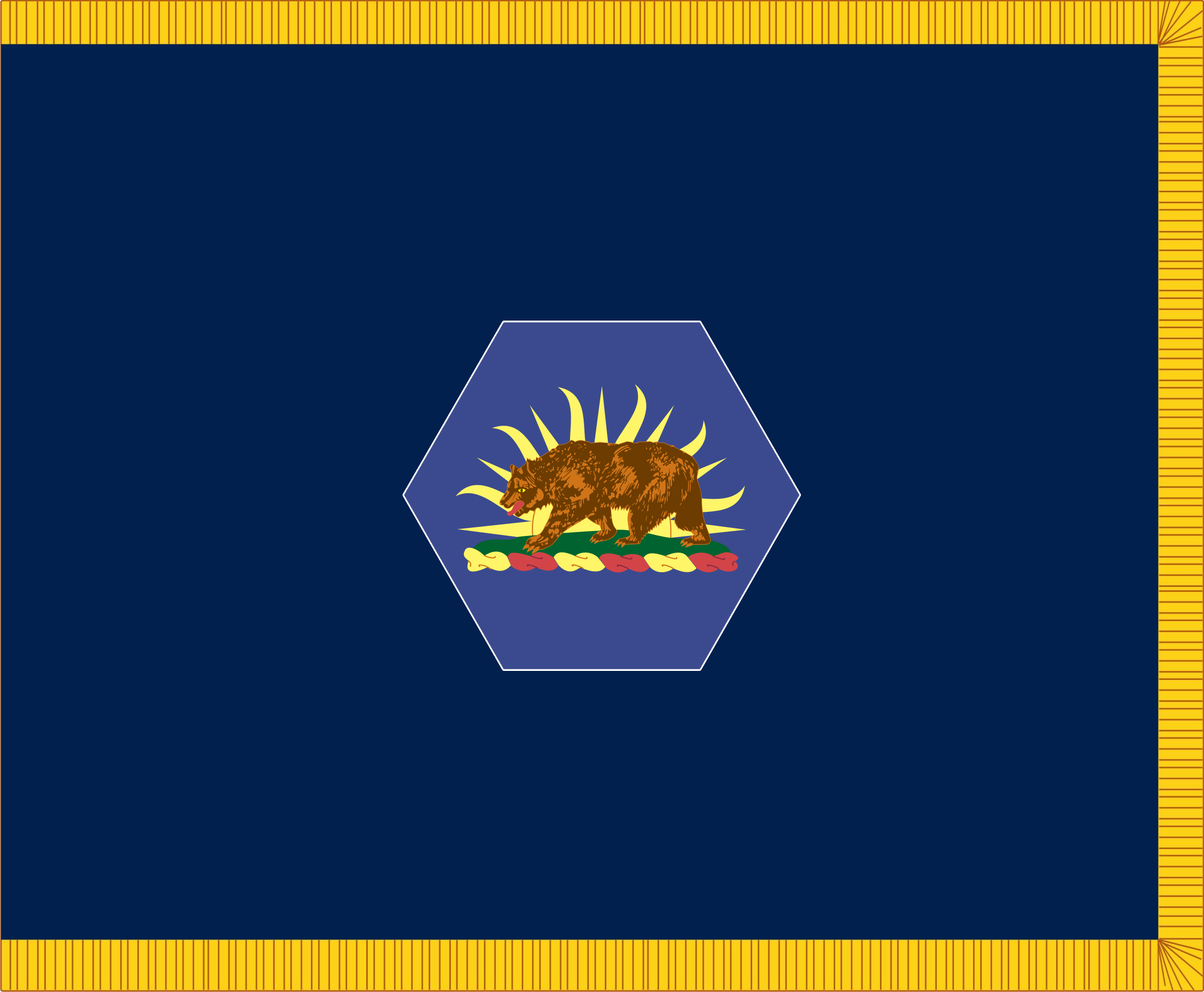
- Flag of the California Army National Guard Headquarters

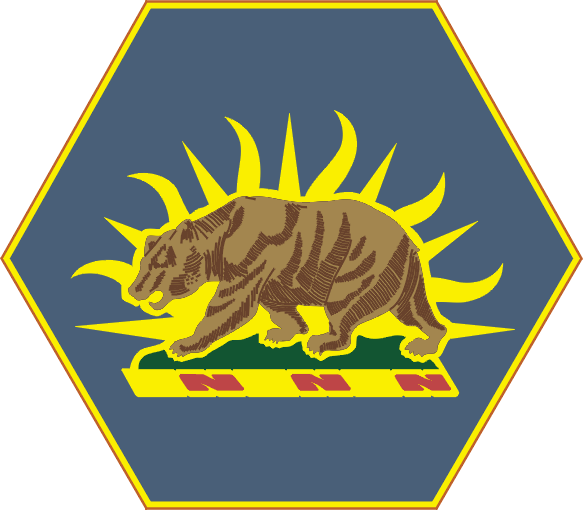
- California ARNG Headquarters DUI

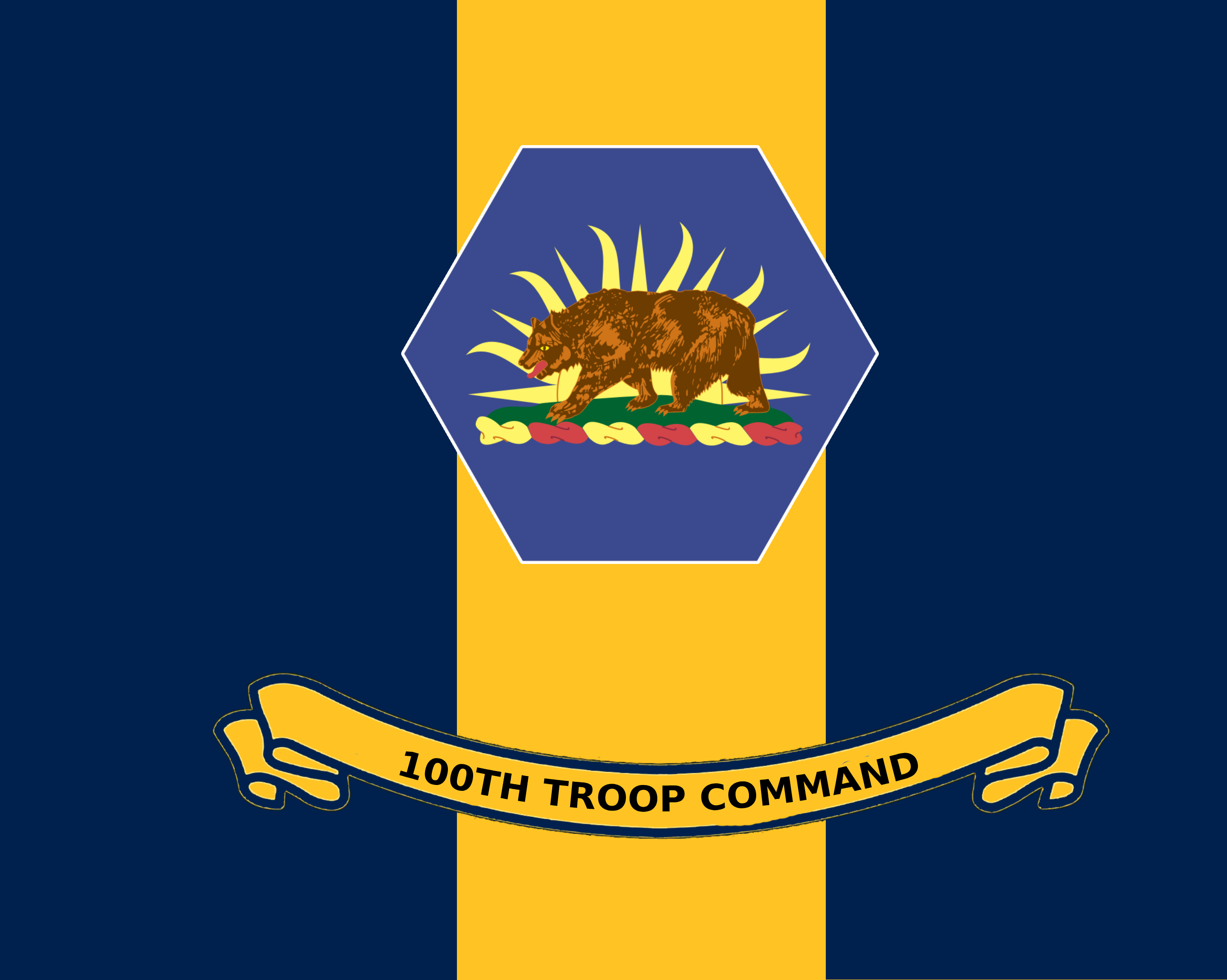
- Flag of the 100th Troop Command California ARNG

The California Army National Guard (CA ARNG) is one of three components of the California National Guard, a reserve of the United States Army, and part of the National Guard of the United States. The California Army National Guard is composed of 18,450 soldiers. Nationwide, the Army National Guard comprises approximately one half of the US Army's available combat forces and approximately one third of its support organization. National coordination of various state National Guard units are maintained through the National Guard Bureau.

California Army National Guard units are trained and equipped as part of the United States Army. The same enlisted and officer ranks and insignia are used and National Guardsmen are eligible to receive all United States military awards. The California Army National Guard also bestows a number of state awards for local services rendered in or to the state of California. The Guard may be federalized by an act of Congress or by the president. It has been federalized in response to the 1992 Los Angeles riots and the June 2025 Los Angeles protests.

As with any state's National Guard, one of the California Army National Guard's primary tasks is to ensure the safety of its citizens in times of crisis. According to the CA ARNG's website, the Guard is "committed to improving, preparing and protecting our communities, state and nation".

== History ==
=== California State Militia ===
The California Army National Guard was formed with the passing of the Militia Act of 1903, also known as the Dick Act. It originated from the state militia established by the Constitution of California in 1849. On 4 April 1850, the first California Legislature in San Jose adopted enabling legislation formally establishing a militia of volunteer or independent companies. The law required every free, white, able-bodied male citizen of the State to perform military duty or to pay a $2 fee for nonperformance of this duty. Such payment exempted the person from duty except in case of war, insurrection, invasion, assistance to the sheriff, or a requisition of the militia. It provided that a judge of the superior court of a county should cause a suitable person to open a book, and enter the names of persons who apply and are able to perform military duty. After required notice, the volunteers were to be organized, and their officers and non-commissioned officers selected by election. The volunteer or independent companies were to be armed and equipped as in the Army of the United States. The units were to adopt a constitution and by-laws as well as rules and regulations for the government of its personnel and determination of fines and penalties to enforce them.

The legislature then provided for the organization of these enrolled state militia, volunteers or independent companies into four divisions, each commanded by a major general and consisting of two brigades, with a statewide adjutant general responsible to the Governor of California. From 1852, the Quartermaster General of California was subsumed under the office of Adjutant General of California, when William H. Richardson resigned and Quartermaster General William Chauncey Kibbe became adjutant general by a law of 1852.

The first unit, known as the First California Guard (officially Company A, First Regiment, Light Artillery), was formed from volunteers in San Francisco, California under Captain Henry Morris Naglee on 27 July 1849, as a territorial militia. It was the first company organized under state authority. Under these regulations, 307 volunteer or independent companies were organized in the early years of the states history to oppose the Indians, hunt down bandits, quell riots or Vigilantes, protect officials, intervene in mining claim disputes and other civil disturbances.

During 1850, Governor Burnett called out the militia two times. The first was prompted by incidents involving the Yuma Indians at the confluence of the Gila and Colorado rivers on 23 April 1850; in response, the governor ordered the sheriffs of San Diego County and Los Angeles County to organize a total of 100 men for the Gila Expedition to "pursue such energetic measures to punish the Indians, bring them to terms, and protect the emigrants on their way to California." The second instance occurred in October 1850, when Governor Burnett ordered the sheriff of El Dorado County to muster 200 men. The commanders were instructed to "proceed to punish the Indians engaged in the late attacks in the vicinity of Ringgold, and along the emigrant trail leading from Salt Lake to California."

From 1850 to 1851 the Mariposa Battalion was raised to fight the Mariposa War in the Sierras. In 1851, the Garra Revolt occurred in San Diego County and the governor called for troops, the Fitzgerald Volunteers were raised in San Diego to defend the county and conducted an expedition to Warners Ranch. Also two companies of Rangers were organized in San Francisco from members of the three militia companies that existed in that city then: First California Guard, Washington Guard and Empire Guard. However, by the time transportation to San Diego was arranged the revolt had been suppressed, and the now idle volunteers caused more trouble in San Diego than the Indians.

In 1853, a company of California State Rangers was organized for the purpose of capturing the famous bandit Joaquin Murrieta. At the same time Los Angeles County formed two companies, Los Angeles Rangers and the Los Angeles Guard. In 1854 the Monte Rangers were formed. During 1855 in San Bernardino County the San Bernardino Rough and Ready Cavalry was formed, replaced in 1856 by the San Bernardino Rangers. These units were raised to support the local authorities in combating Indian raids and the influx of criminals into Southern California, driven out of the northern part of the state by vigilantism in San Francisco and the Gold Country.

In 1854, the six companies in San Francisco, were formed into a battalion. In 1855, the militia was again reorganized. Provision was made for six divisions and 12 brigades. More extended military rolls were to be kept by the county assessors of each county.

In 1855, six California militia units were raised or mobilized in Humboldt and Klamath Counties for defense of the inhabitants in the Klamath and Salmon River War.

In 1856, Tulare Mounted Riflemen, a California State Militia unit of Tulare County, fought the Yokuts in the Tule River War.

In the winter in early 1858, a number of militia companies were raised for the Utah War, which was settled in by that spring before they could become involved. In 1858–59, Captain Isaac G. Messec and his company, the Trinity Rangers fought the Klamath & Humboldt Expedition against the Whilkut or Redwood Indians. In 1859, the Kibbe Rangers under William Byrnes and local posses fought the Pitt River Expedition against the Achomawi (Pit River) and Atsugewi (Hat Creek) tribes.

In 1860 the Independent City Guard and another company of volunteers from Sacramento, and the Nevada Rifles from Nevada City joined the Washoe Regiment and fought in the Carson River Expedition in the Paiute War.

=== Civil War ===
As the secession crisis developed in early 1861, several Volunteer Companies of the California Militia had disbanded because of divided loyalties and new ones with loyal Union men were sworn in across the state under the supervision of County sheriffs and judges. Many of these units saw no action but some were to form the companies of the earliest California Volunteer Regiments. Others like the Petaluma Guard and Emmet Rifles in Sonoma County suppressed a secessionist disturbance in Healdsburg, in 1862. Union commanders relied on the San Bernardino Mounted Rifles to hold the pro southern San Bernardino County for the Union in late 1861 as federal troops were being withdrawn and replaced by California Volunteers.

Notable as the only active pro-Southern militia unit, the Los Angeles Mounted Rifles was organized on 7 March 1861, in Los Angeles County. It included more than a few Californios in its leadership and its ranks including the County Sheriff, one of his Undersheriffs and several of his deputies. A. J. King another Undersheriff of Los Angeles County (and former member of the earlier "Monte Rangers") and other influential men in El Monte, formed another secessionist militia the Monte Mounted Rifles on 23 March 1861. However, the attempt failed when A. J. King marched through the streets following news of the Battle of Fort Sumter with a portrait of the Confederate General P. G. T. Beauregard and was arrested by a U.S. Marshal. State arms sent from Governor John G. Downey for the unit were held up by Union officers at the port of San Pedro. Due to the activities of secessionists within companies and disappearance of arms with the Los Angeles Mounted Rifles, the Legislature passed a law giving the governor the power to recover from any company its arms and equipment to prevent traitors from getting possession of state arms.

In 1862, the crisis of the American Civil War compelled the militia to be reorganized. Volunteer companies were to be reorganized, classified, assigned to militia battalions and regiments and staffs were to be provided to them. Administration was improved, bonds required, military duty exacted, enrollments and assessments created, muster rolls defined, activation of the militia determined, disciplinary procedure adopted, courts-martial provided, compensation fixed, arms and equipment provided, and prior conflicting acts repealed.

During the Civil War 88 militia companies had been formed to serve, if required, in their respective localities, or to respond to a call from the governor. However, by the end of the Civil War only two of the six Divisions were active and only six of the twelve Brigades of which only the 2nd, 3rd, and 4th Brigades were organized into battalions and regiments.

=== Later 19th century ===
In 1866, the Legislature for the first time employed the term "National Guard" as the title of the organized uniformed troops of the State of California. The statute provided for the organization of the National Guard, General and Special Staffs, formations of companies, service, arms and equipment, created a Board of Organization, formed a Board of Military Auditors, adopted a system of instruction and drill, described in detail the duties of the Adjutant General, created privileges and exemptions, allowances and expenses, limited the issuance of arms to troops only, provided for military musters and active service.

=== Early 20th century ===
The Militia Act of 1903 organized the various state militias into the present National Guard system. Between the wars the 79th Infantry Brigade existed in the state, with the 159th and 184th Infantry Regiments.

The California Army National Guard played an important role in World War II. One of the most illustrious California military units, the 40th Infantry Division, fought against the Imperial Japanese in the Pacific. California's 184th Infantry Regiment also fought in the Pacific Theater. The 40th Tank Company took part in the defense of Luzon, but was forced to surrender at Bataan. CA National Guard units also found themselves in the European theater of the war. The 144th Field Artillery Group and 159th Infantry Regiment both fought in one of the most infamous battles of the war, the Battle of the Bulge.

Soon after World War II the 49th Infantry Division was organized in the state, but it disappeared after later reorganization. On 1 February 1976, the 49th Infantry Brigade, CA ARNG, was redesignated the 49th MP Brigade at Alameda, California.

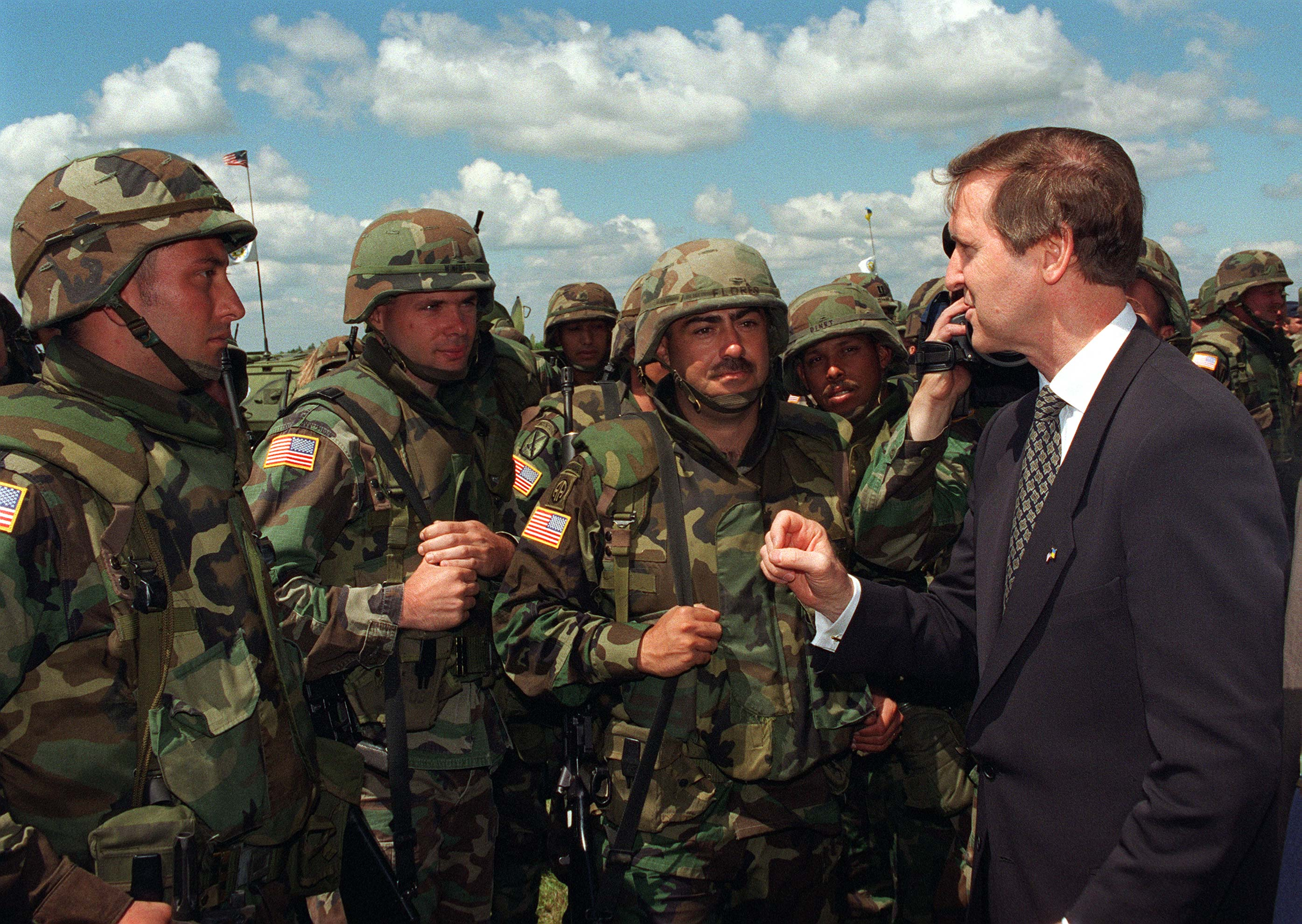
Secretary of Defense William Cohen talks with soldiers from a California Army National Guard unit.

=== Post World War II ===
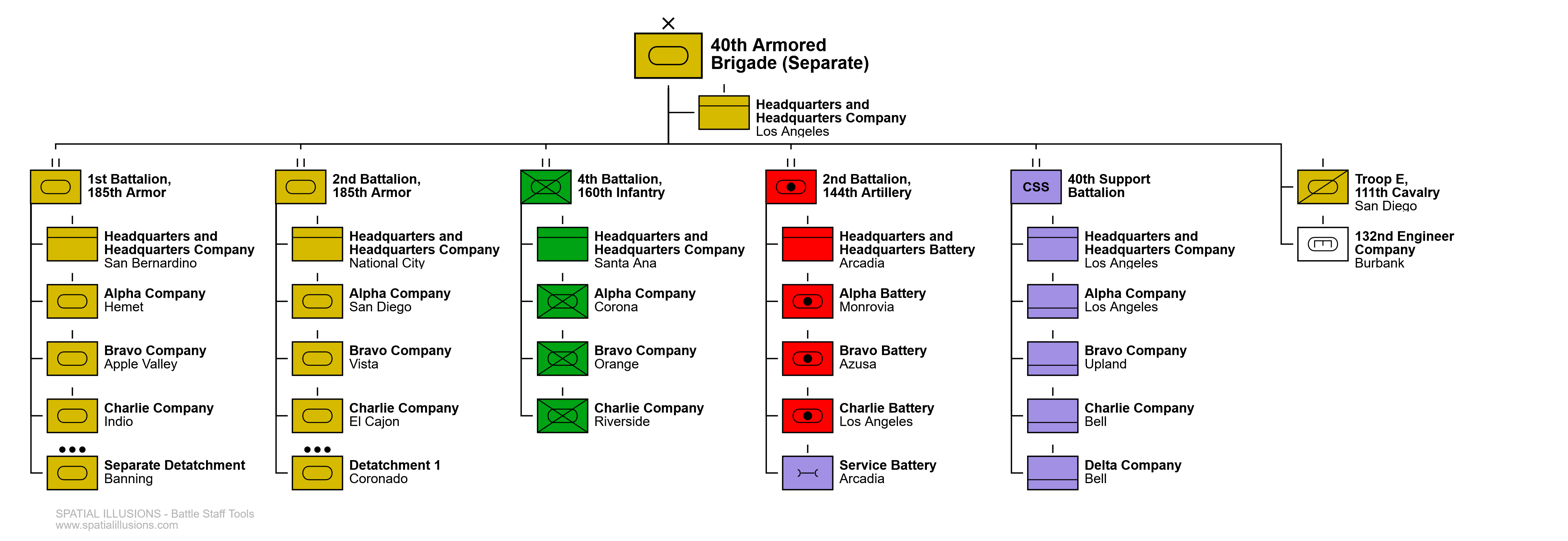
40th Armored Brigade (Separate) of the California Army National Guard as of 1971.

The 40th Infantry Division from the CA ARNG served in the Korean War.

As the Vietnam War escalated, a limited number of Army National Guard units were deployed. California was not exempt from this. Both 1st Squadron, 18th Armored Cavalry Regiment and the 40th Aviation Company received mobilization orders. Despite being trained at Fort Lewis, Washington, the 18th Armored Cavalry never went to Vietnam. Instead, their gear was transferred to units of the Army of the Republic of Vietnam. The 18th Armored Cavalry was sent back to California, though many of its members went on to serve in Vietnam.

Units and members of the California Army National Guard have served in Operation Desert Storm and Desert Shield, Bosnia, Kosovo, Afghanistan, Iraq, Guantanamo Bay, Sinai Peninsula, Qatar, Germany, Spain, Panama, Ukraine, Kyrgyzstan, Kuwait, during the 1992 Los Angeles riots, on the US/Mexico Border mission, during Hurricane Katrina humanitarian efforts, in airports and seaports around California, and in homeland security tasks in various military bases across the US.

=== Twenty-first century ===
1st Battalion, 149th Armor Regiment, was activated for Operation Noble Eagle, providing security at potential terrorist targets in the United States, in 2003. Following redesignation of the regiment from armor to armored in 2005, it was merged into the 340th Brigade Support Battalion in 2007.

In September 2017, about 300 Army National Guard soldiers of the 184th Infantry Battalion deployed to Jordan to take part in Operation Spartan Shield. Modesto's 1st Battalion, 184th Infantry Regiment is one of the most active California Army National Guard units, having been mobilized or deployed to Kosovo, Iraq, and Jordan within the past decade.

A Black Hawk helicopter from the 140th Aviation Regiment drops water on the camp fire, November 14, 2018

In response to the Camp Fire, California activated 700 soldiers in different support roles. Fires are some of the most common and devastating natural disasters in California, causing units like the 140th Aviation Regiment to be used to support fire department efforts. Military Police are also utilized in massive evacuation efforts.

March 2019 saw the return of the CA ARNG's 40th Infantry Division from a 9-month tour in Afghanistan. This was the second rotation of troops to return from Afghanistan, and the 40th Infantry Division's first combat deployment since the Korean War.

In June 2025, the California National Guard became the subject of a high-profile legal and political dispute when President Donald Trump issued a memorandum federalizing up to 4,000 Guard members and deploying approximately 700 U.S. Marines to Los Angeles during protests following federal immigration raids. Governor Gavin Newsom strongly opposed the move, asserting that it exceeded presidential authority under Title 10 and was unnecessary given local law enforcement's control.

== Historic units ==
- 250th Air Defense Artillery Regiment
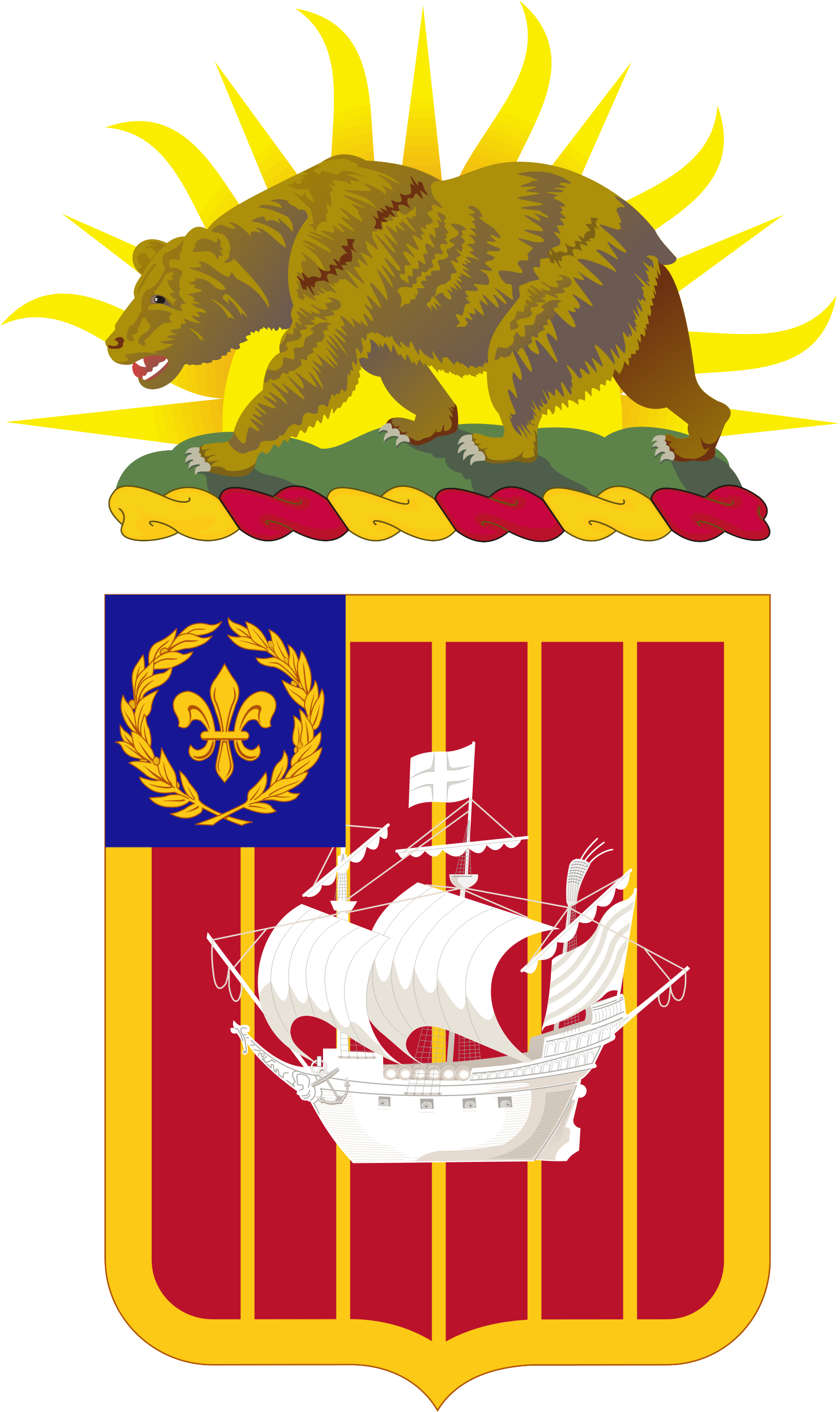
- 251st Air Defense Artillery Regiment
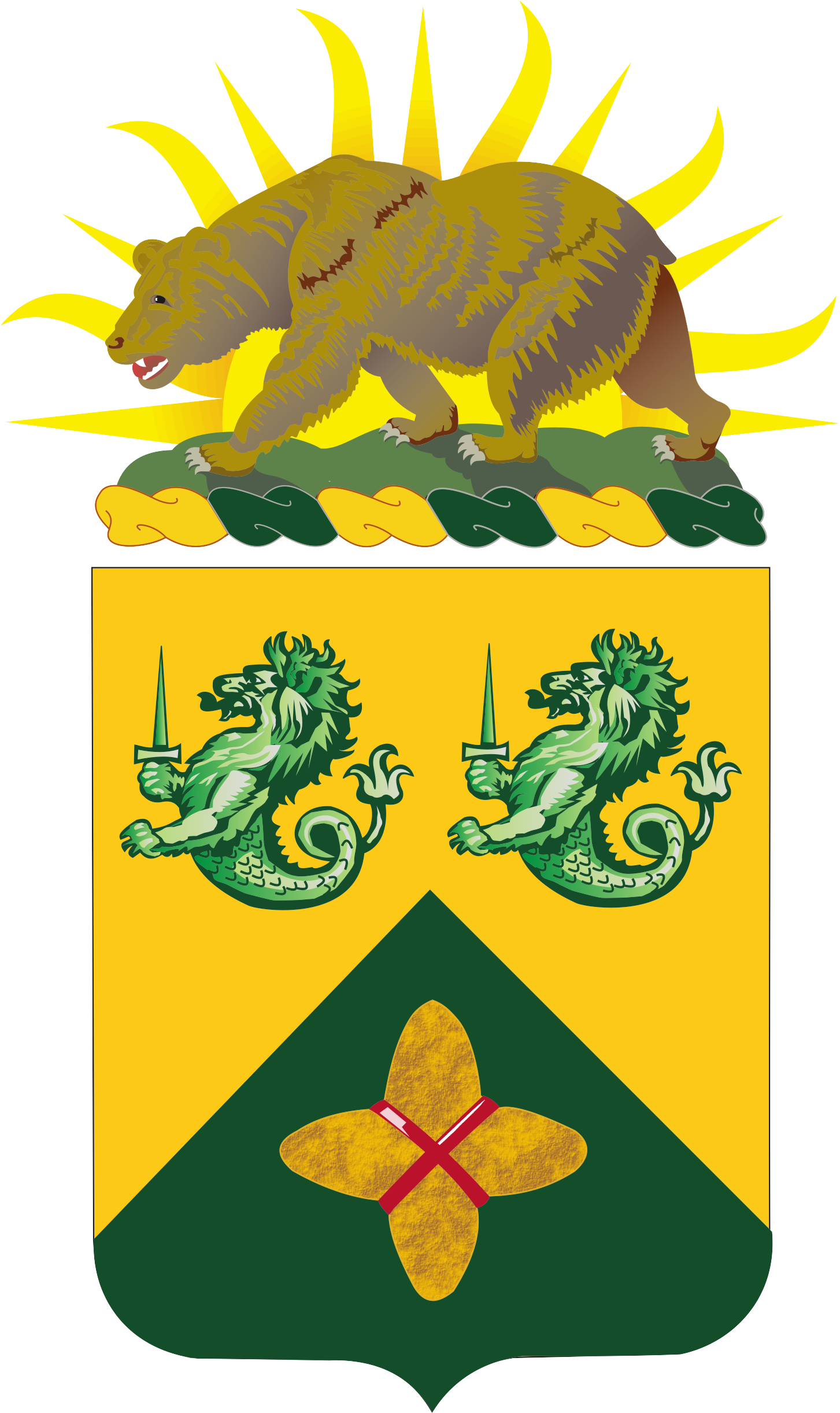
- 185th Armor Regiment
- 140th Aviation Regiment
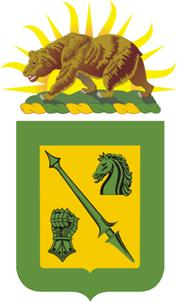
- 18th Cavalry Regiment
- 111th Armored Cavalry Regiment (111th ACR)
- 170th Cavalry Regiment
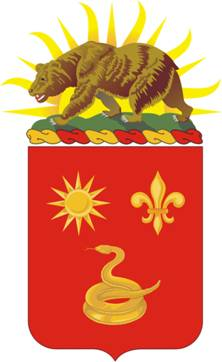
- 143rd Field Artillery Regiment (143rd FAR)
- 144th Field Artillery Regiment (144th FAR)
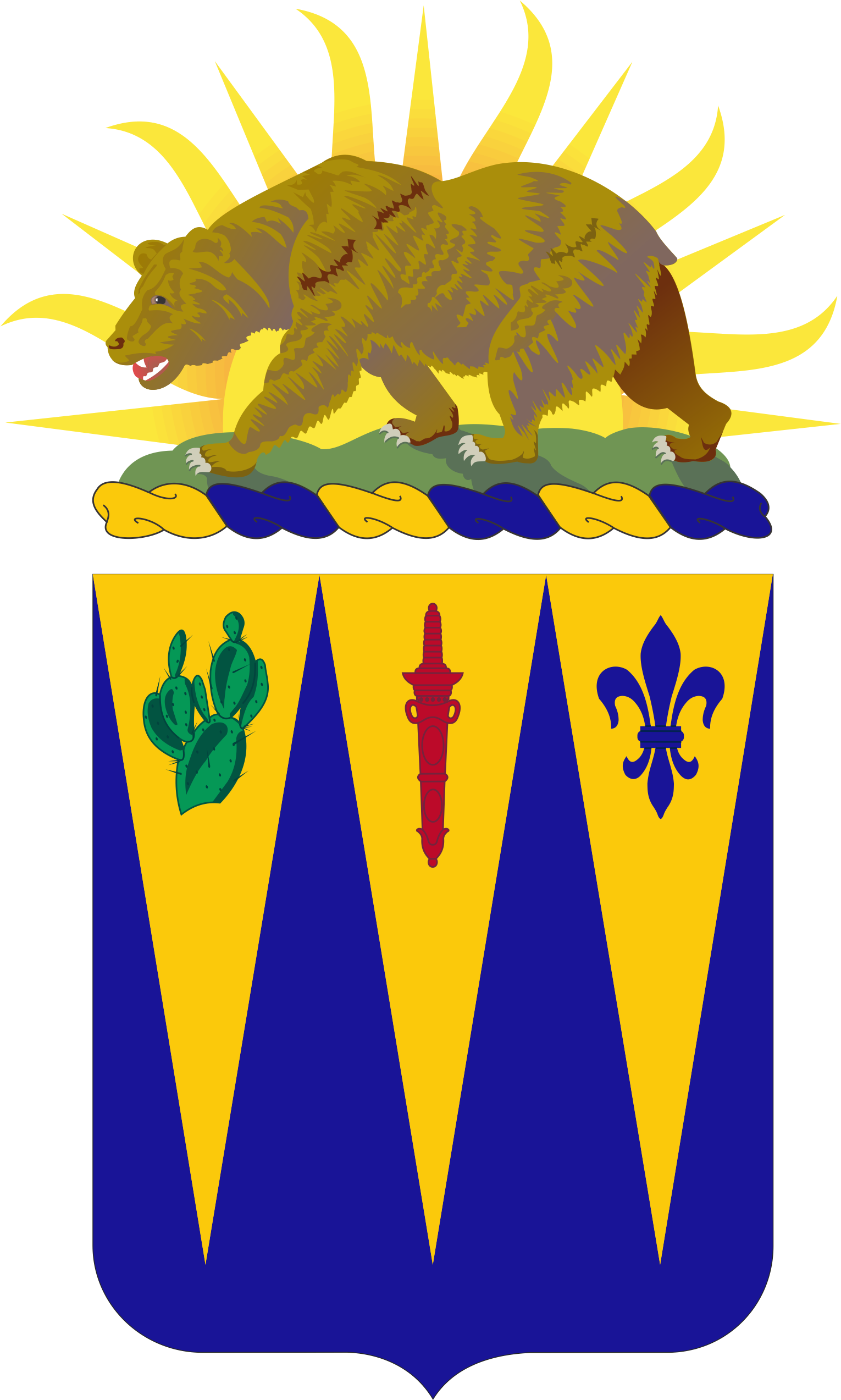
- 159th Infantry Regiment
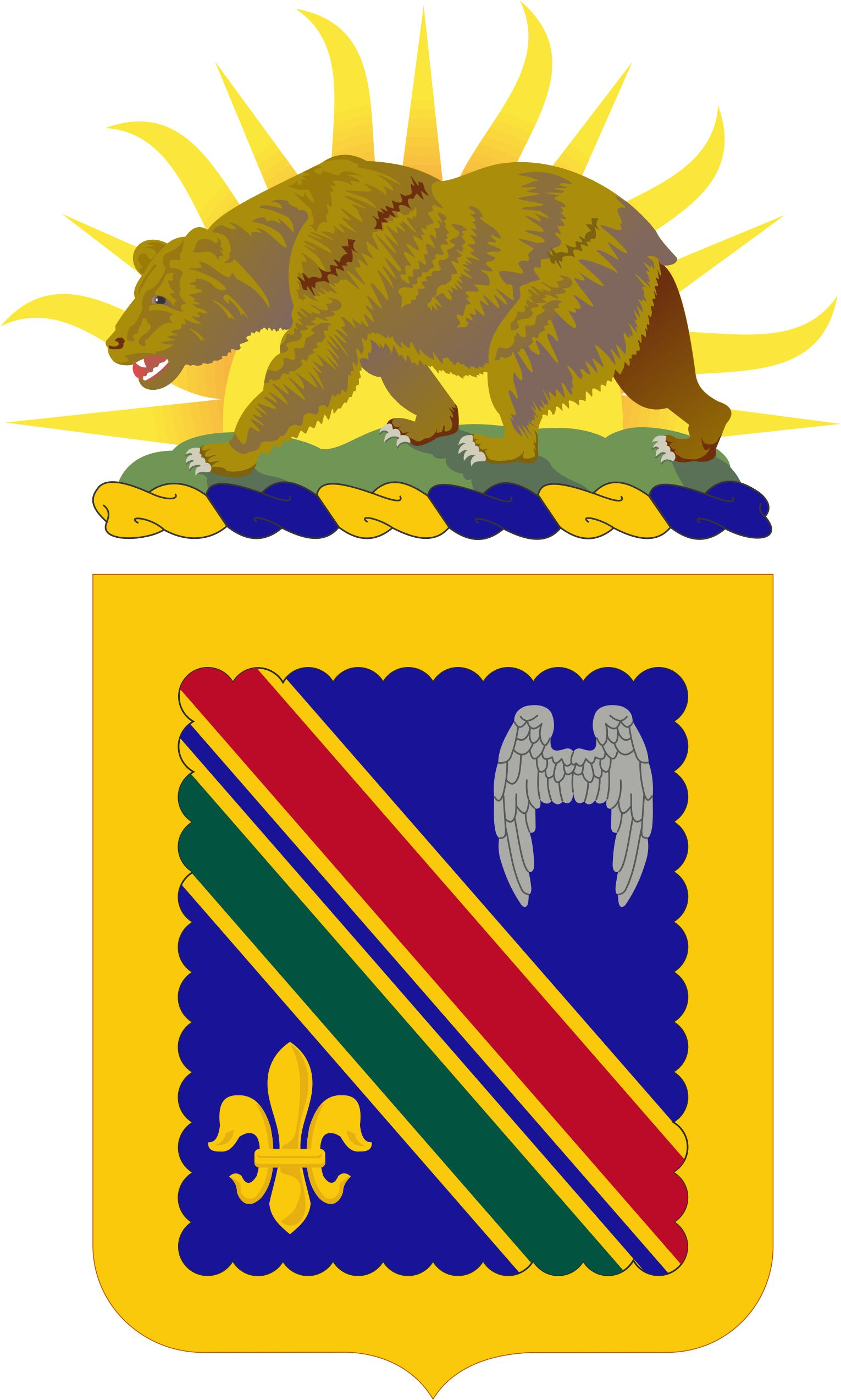
- 160th Infantry Regiment
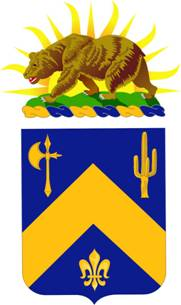
- 184th Infantry Regiment
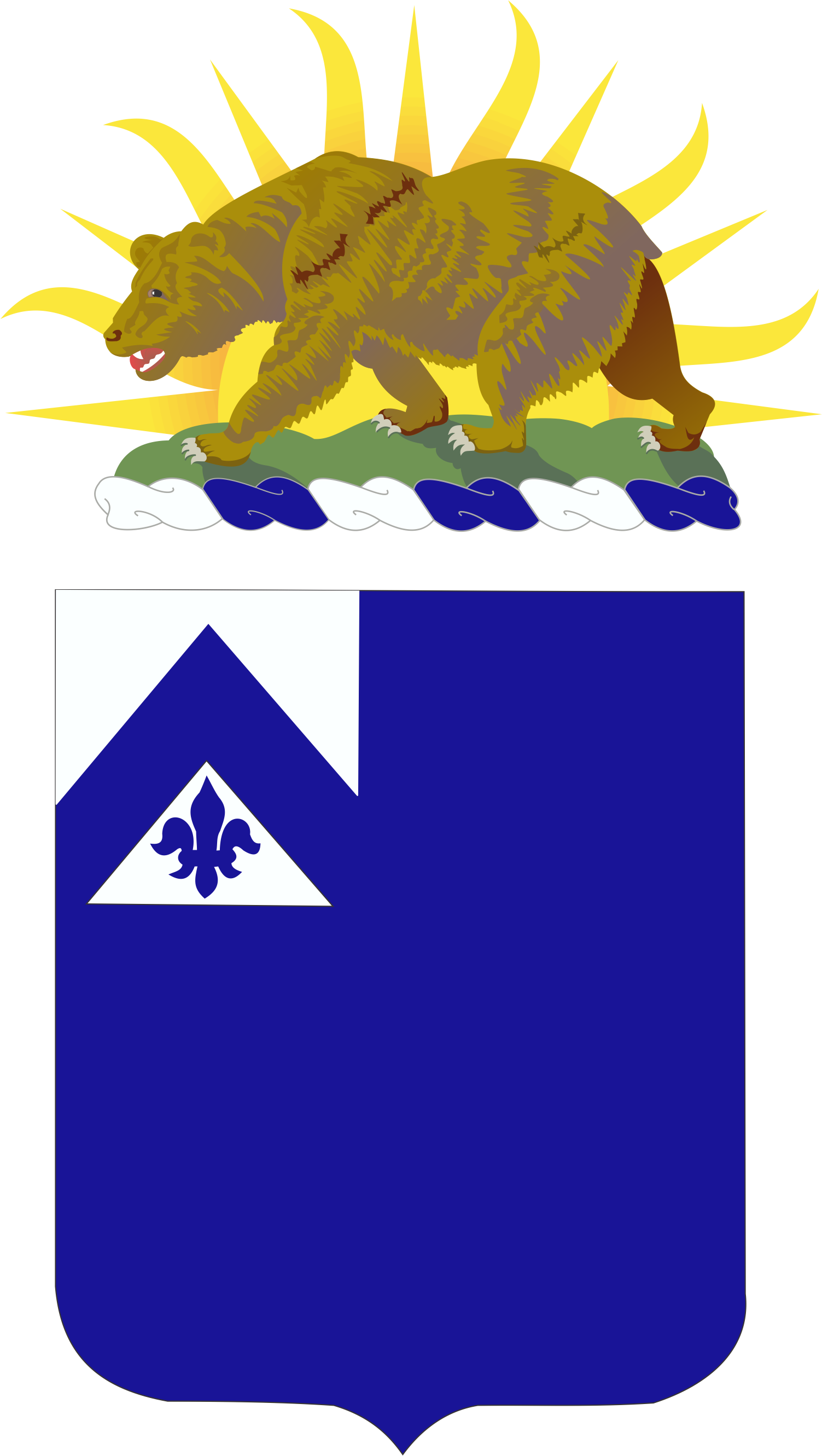
- 185th Infantry Regiment
- 223rd Infantry Regiment
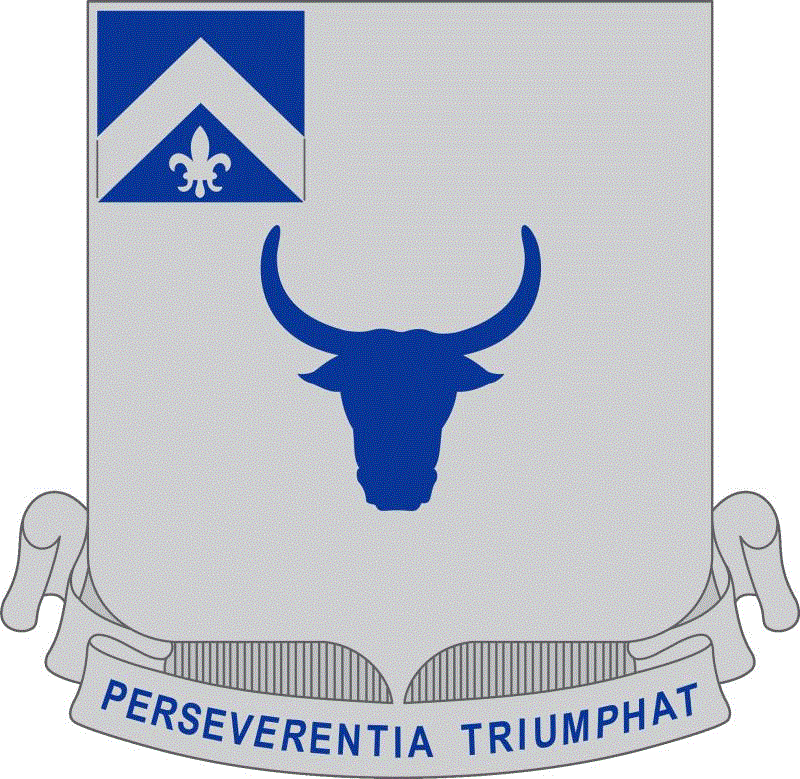
- 224th Infantry Regiment
- 115th Quartermaster Regiment
- 132nd Engineer Battalion

== Units in 2026 ==
As of January 2026 the California Army National Guard consists of the following units:

- Joint Force Headquarters-California, Army Element, in Rancho Cordova
  - Headquarters and Headquarters Detachment, Joint Force Headquarters-California, Army Element, in Rancho Cordova
    - Detachment 1, Headquarters and Headquarters Detachment, Joint Force Headquarters-California, Army Element, at Camp Roberts
    - Detachment 4 (Supply), Headquarters and Headquarters Detachment, Joint Force Headquarters-California, Army Element, in Sacramento
  - California Recruiting & Retention Battalion, in Roseville
    - Company A, California Recruiting & Retention Battalion, at Joint Forces Training Base – Los Alamitos
      - Detachment 1, Company A, California Recruiting & Retention Battalion, at Joint Forces Training Base – Los Alamitos
      - Detachment 2, Company A, California Recruiting & Retention Battalion, in Azusa
    - Company B, California Recruiting & Retention Battalion, in Sacramento
      - Detachment 1, Company B, California Recruiting & Retention Battalion, at Hammer Army Airfield
      - Detachment 2, Company B, California Recruiting & Retention Battalion, in Yuba City
    - Company C, California Recruiting & Retention Battalion, in Ontario
      - Detachment 1, Company C, California Recruiting & Retention Battalion, in San Diego
      - Detachment 2, Company C, California Recruiting & Retention Battalion, at March Air Reserve Base
    - Company D, California Recruiting & Retention Battalion, at Camp Parks
      - Detachment 1, Company D, California Recruiting & Retention Battalion, in Pittsburg
      - Detachment 2, Company D, California Recruiting & Retention Battalion, in Redding
  - California Medical Detachment, in Sacramento
    - Detachment 1, California Medical Detachment, at Joint Forces Training Base – Los Alamitos
  - California Training Site, at Joint Forces Training Base – Los Alamitos
  - Camp Roberts Training Center, in San Miguel
  - Camp San Luis Obispo Training Center, in San Luis Obispo
  - 95th Civil Support Team (WMD), in Hayward
  - 251st Battlefield Coordination Detachment, in Sacramento
  - Army Aviation Support Facility #1, at Los Alamitos Army Airfield
  - Army Aviation Support Facility #2, at Stockton Army Airfield
  - Army Aviation Support Facility #3, at Sacramento Mather Airport
  - Army Aviation Flight Activity #1, at Hammer Army Airfield
  - Combined Support Maintenance Shop #1, in Stockton
  - Combined Support Maintenance Shop #2, in Long Beach
  - Maneuver Area Training Equipment Site #1, at Fort Irwin National Training Center
  - Maneuver Area Training Equipment Site #2, at Camp Roberts Training Center
  - Field Maintenance Shop #1, in Ontario
  - Field Maintenance Shop #2, in Barstow
  - Field Maintenance Shop #3, in Santa Ana
  - Field Maintenance Shop #4, in Riverside
  - Field Maintenance Shop #6, in Bell
  - Field Maintenance Shop #9, in Inglewood
  - Field Maintenance Shop #10, in Los Angeles
  - Field Maintenance Shop #12, in Bakersfield
  - Field Maintenance Shop #13, in Burbank
  - Field Maintenance Shop #17, in San Diego
  - Field Maintenance Shop #19, at Camp San Luis Obispo
  - Field Maintenance Shop #22, in Sacramento
  - Field Maintenance Shop #23, in Red Bluff
  - Field Maintenance Shop #25, at Hammer Army Airfield
  - Field Maintenance Shop #26, in Salinas
  - Field Maintenance Shop #27, in Modesto
  - Field Maintenance Shop #31, in Oroville
  - Field Maintenance Shop #33, at Camp Parks
  - Field Maintenance Shop #34, in Santa Rosa
  - Field Maintenance Shop #37, in Eureka
  - Field Maintenance Shop #38, in Mountain View
  - 40th Infantry Division, at Joint Forces Training Base – Los Alamitos
    - Headquarters and Headquarters Battalion, 40th Infantry Division, at Joint Forces Training Base – Los Alamitos
      - Headquarters Support Company, 40th Infantry Division, at Joint Forces Training Base – Los Alamitos
      - Company A (Operations), Headquarters and Headquarters Battalion, 40th Infantry Division, at Joint Forces Training Base – Los Alamitos
      - Company B (Intelligence and Sustainment), Headquarters and Headquarters Battalion, 40th Infantry Division, at Joint Forces Training Base – Los Alamitos
      - Company C (Signal), Headquarters and Headquarters Battalion, 40th Infantry Division, at Joint Forces Training Base – Los Alamitos
      - 40th Infantry Division Band, at Joint Forces Training Base – Los Alamitos
        - Detachment 1, 40th Infantry Division Band, in Yuba City
    - 29th Infantry Brigade Combat Team, in Kalaeloa (HI) — (Hawaii Army National Guard)
    - 41st Infantry Brigade Combat Team, at Camp Withycombe (OR) — (Oregon Army National Guard)
    - 79th Infantry Brigade Combat Team, in San Diego
      - Headquarters and Headquarters Company, 79th Infantry Brigade Combat Team, in San Diego
      - 1st Squadron, 18th Cavalry Regiment, in Azusa
        - Headquarters and Headquarters Troop, 1st Squadron, 18th Cavalry Regiment, in Azusa
        - Troop A, 1st Squadron, 18th Cavalry Regiment, in Azusa
        - Troop B, 1st Squadron, 18th Cavalry Regiment, in Azusa
        - Troop C (Dismounted), 1st Squadron, 18th Cavalry Regiment, in El Cajon
      - 1st Battalion, 65th Infantry Regiment, in Cayey (PR) — (Puerto Rico Army National Guard)
      - 1st Battalion, 160th Infantry Regiment, in Inglewood
        - Headquarters and Headquarters Company, 1st Battalion, 160th Infantry Regiment, in Inglewood
        - Company A, 1st Battalion, 160th Infantry Regiment, in Fullerton
        - Company B, 1st Battalion, 160th Infantry Regiment, in Glendale
        - Company C, 1st Battalion, 160th Infantry Regiment, in Orange
        - Company D (Weapons), 1st Battalion, 160th Infantry Regiment, in San Pedro
      - 1st Battalion, 184th Infantry Regiment, in Modesto
        - Headquarters and Headquarters Company, 1st Battalion, 184th Infantry Regiment, in Modesto
        - Company A, 1st Battalion, 184th Infantry Regiment, in Visalia
        - Company B, 1st Battalion, 184th Infantry Regiment, at Camp Parks
        - Company C, 1st Battalion, 184th Infantry Regiment, in Sacramento
        - Company D (Weapons), 1st Battalion, 184th Infantry Regiment, in Oakdale
      - 1st Battalion, 143rd Field Artillery Regiment, in Richmond
        - Headquarters and Headquarters Battery, 1st Battalion, 143rd Field Artillery Regiment, in Richmond
          - Detachment 1, Headquarters and Headquarters Battery, 1st Battalion, 143rd Field Artillery Regiment, in Los Angeles
        - Battery A, 1st Battalion, 143rd Field Artillery Regiment, in Sacramento
        - Battery B, 1st Battalion, 143rd Field Artillery Regiment, at Hammer Army Airfield
          - Detachment 1, Battery B, 1st Battalion, 143rd Field Artillery Regiment, in Ventura
        - Battery C, 1st Battalion, 143rd Field Artillery Regiment, in Bakersfield
      - 578th Brigade Engineer Battalion, in Manhattan Beach
        - Headquarters and Headquarters Company, 578th Brigade Engineer Battalion, in Manhattan Beach
        - Company A (Combat Engineer), 578th Brigade Engineer Battalion, in El Centro
        - Company B (Combat Engineer), 578th Brigade Engineer Battalion, in Escondido
        - Company C (Signal), 578th Brigade Engineer Battalion, in San Diego
        - Company D (Military Intelligence), 578th Brigade Engineer Battalion, in San Diego
          - Detachment 1, Company D (Military Intelligence), 578th Brigade Engineer Battalion, at Camp Roberts (RQ-28A UAV)
      - 40th Brigade Support Battalion, in Bell
        - Headquarters and Headquarters Company, 40th Brigade Support Battalion, in Bell
        - Company A (Distribution), 40th Brigade Support Battalion, in Bell
        - Company B (Maintenance), 40th Brigade Support Battalion, in Bell
        - Company C (Medical), 40th Brigade Support Battalion, in Bell
        - Company D (Forward Support), 40th Brigade Support Battalion, in Azusa — attached to 1st Squadron, 18th Cavalry Regiment
        - Company E (Forward Support), 40th Brigade Support Battalion, in San Diego — attached to 578th Brigade Engineer Battalion
        - Company F (Forward Support), 40th Brigade Support Battalion, in Walnut Creek — attached to 1st Battalion, 143rd Field Artillery Regiment
        - Company G (Forward Support), 40th Brigade Support Battalion, in Santa Ana — attached to 1st Battalion, 160th Infantry Regiment
        - Company H (Forward Support), 40th Brigade Support Battalion, at Hammer Army Airfield — attached to 1st Battalion, 184th Infantry Regiment
        - Company I (Forward Support), 40th Brigade Support Battalion, in Cayey (PR) — attached to 1st Battalion, 65th Infantry Regiment (Puerto Rico Army National Guard)
    - 40th Division Artillery, at Joint Forces Training Base – Los Alamitos
      - Headquarters and Headquarters Battery, 40th Division Artillery, at Joint Forces Training Base – Los Alamitos
    - 40th Combat Aviation Brigade, at Hammer Army Airfield
      - Headquarters and Headquarters Company, 40th Combat Aviation Brigade, at Hammer Airfield
      - Company B (Heavy Lift), 1st Battalion (General Support Aviation), 126th Aviation Regiment, at Stockton Army Airfield (CH-47F)
        - Detachment 1, Headquarters and Headquarters Company, 1st Battalion (General Support Aviation), 126th Aviation Regiment, at Stockton Army Airfield
        - Detachment 1, Company D (AVUM), 1st Battalion (General Support Aviation), 126th Aviation Regiment, at Stockton Army Airfield
        - Detachment 1, Company E (Forward Support), 1st Battalion (General Support Aviation), 126th Aviation Regiment, at Stockton Army Airfield
      - Company F (ATS), 1st Battalion (General Support Aviation), 126th Aviation Regiment, at Los Alamitos Army Airfield
      - Company C (MEDEVAC), 2nd Battalion (General Support Aviation), 135th Aviation Regiment, at Sacramento Mather Airport (HH-60M Black Hawk)
        - Detachment 4, Headquarters and Headquarters Company, 2nd Battalion (General Support Aviation), 135th Aviation Regiment, at Sacramento Mather Airport
        - Detachment 4, Company D (AVUM), 2nd Battalion (General Support Aviation), 135th Aviation Regiment, at Sacramento Mather Airport
        - Detachment 4, Company E (Forward Support), 2nd Battalion (General Support Aviation), 135th Aviation Regiment, at Sacramento Mather Airport
      - Detachment 3, Company A, 2nd Battalion (Fixed Wing), 245th Aviation Regiment (Detachment 32, Operational Support Airlift Activity), at Sacramento Mather Airport (C-12 Huron)
      - 1st Battalion (Assault), 140th Aviation Regiment, at Los Alamitos Army Airfield
        - Headquarters and Headquarters Company, 1st Battalion (Assault), 140th Aviation Regiment, at Los Alamitos Army Airfield
          - Detachment 1, Headquarters and Headquarters Company, 1st Battalion (Assault), 140th Aviation Regiment, at Gray Army Airfield (WA) — (Washington Army National Guard)
        - Company A, 1st Battalion (Assault), 140th Aviation Regiment, at Los Alamitos Army Airfield (UH-60M Black Hawk)
        - Company B, 1st Battalion (Assault), 140th Aviation Regiment, at Los Alamitos Army Airfield (UH-60M Black Hawk)
          - Detachment 1, Company B, 1st Battalion (Assault), 140th Aviation Regiment, at Hammer Army Airfield
        - Company C, 1st Battalion (Assault), 140th Aviation Regiment, at Gray Army Airfield (WA) (UH-60M Black Hawk) — (Washington Army National Guard)
        - Company D (AVUM), 1st Battalion (Assault), 140th Aviation Regiment, at Los Alamitos Army Airfield
          - Detachment 1, Company D (AVUM), 1st Battalion (Assault), 140th Aviation Regiment, at Gray Army Airfield (WA) — (Washington Army National Guard)
        - Company E (Forward Support), 1st Battalion (Assault), 140th Aviation Regiment, at Los Alamitos Army Airfield
          - Detachment 1, Company E (Forward Support), 1st Battalion (Assault), 140th Aviation Regiment, at Gray Army Airfield (WA) — (Washington Army National Guard)
      - 3rd Battalion (Security & Support), 140th Aviation Regiment, at Stockton Army Airfield
        - Headquarters and Headquarters Company, 3rd Battalion (Security & Support), 140th Aviation Regiment, at Stockton Army Airfield
        - Company A, 3rd Battalion (Security & Support), 140th Aviation Regiment, at Stockton Army Airfield (UH-72A Lakota)
          - Detachment 1, Company A, 3rd Battalion (Security & Support), 140th Aviation Regiment, at Wheeler Army Airfield (HI) — (Hawaii Army National Guard)
          - Detachment 1, Company A, 3rd Battalion (Security & Support), 140th Aviation Regiment, at Sacramento Mather Airport
        - Company B, 3rd Battalion (Security & Support), 140th Aviation Regiment, at Silverbell Army Heliport (AZ) (UH-72A Lakota) — (Arizona Army National Guard)
          - Detachment 1, Company B, 3rd Battalion (Security & Support), 140th Aviation Regiment, at North Las Vegas Airport (NV) — (Nevada Army National Guard)
          - Detachment 2, Company B, 3rd Battalion (Security & Support), 140th Aviation Regiment, at Muldrow Army Heliport (OK) — (Oklahoma Army National Guard)
        - Company C, 3rd Battalion (Security & Support), 140th Aviation Regiment, at Las Cruces Airport (NM) (UH-72A Lakota) — (New Mexico Army National Guard)
          - Detachment 1, Company C, 3rd Battalion (Security & Support), 140th Aviation Regiment, at Gowen Field (ID) — (Idaho Army National Guard)
          - Detachment 2, Company C, 3rd Battalion (Security & Support), 140th Aviation Regiment, at Bryant Army Heliport (AK) — (Alaska Army National Guard)
        - Company D (MEDEVAC), 3rd Battalion (Security & Support), 140th Aviation Regiment, at Buckley Space Force Base (CO) (UH-72A Lakota) — (Colorado Army National Guard)
          - Detachment 1, Company D (MEDEVAC), 3rd Battalion (Security & Support), 140th Aviation Regiment, at North Las Vegas Airport (NV) — (Nevada Army National Guard)
          - Detachment 2, Company D (MEDEVAC), 3rd Battalion (Security & Support), 140th Aviation Regiment, at Stockton Army Airfield
      - 1st Battalion (General Support Aviation), 168th Aviation Regiment, at Gray Army Airfield (WA) — (Washington Army National Guard)
      - 1st Battalion (Attack Reconnaissance), 211th Aviation Regiment, at South Valley Regional Airport (UT) — (Utah Army National Guard)
      - 640th Aviation Support Battalion, at Los Alamitos Army Airfield
        - Headquarters Support Company, 640th Aviation Support Battalion, at Los Alamitos Army Airfield
        - Company A (Distribution), 640th Aviation Support Battalion, in Torrance
        - Company B (AVIM), 640th Aviation Support Battalion, at Los Alamitos Army Airfield
          - Detachment 1, Company B (AVIM), 640th Aviation Support Battalion, at Silverbell Army Heliport (AZ) — (Arizona Army National Guard)
          - Detachment 3, Company B (AVIM), 640th Aviation Support Battalion, at Stockton Army Airfield
          - Detachment 4, Company B (AVIM), 640th Aviation Support Battalion, at Central Nebraska Airport (NE) — (Nebraska Army National Guard)
        - Company C (Signal), 640th Aviation Support Battalion, at Hammer Army Airfield
    - 40th Division Sustainment Brigade, in Long Beach
      - 40th Division Sustainment Troops Battalion, in Long Beach
        - Headquarters and Headquarters Company, 40th Division Sustainment Brigade, in Long Beach
        - 240th Signal Company, in Long Beach
      - 746th Division Sustainment Support Battalion, in Burbank
        - Headquarters and Headquarters Company, 746th Division Sustainment Support Battalion, in Burbank
        - Company A (Composite Supply Company), 746th Division Sustainment Support Battalion, in Vallejo
          - Detachment 1, Company A, 746th Division Sustainment Support Battalion, at Camp San Luis Obispo
          - Detachment 2, Company A, 746th Division Sustainment Support Battalion, in Bakersfield
        - Company B (Support Maintenance Company), 746th Division Sustainment Support Battalion, at Stockton Army Airfield
          - Detachment 1, Company B, 746th Division Sustainment Support Battalion, in Pomona
        - Company C (Composite Truck Company), 746th Division Sustainment Support Battalion, in Bakersfield
          - Detachment 1, Company C, 746th Division Sustainment Support Battalion, in Burbank
      - 749th Division Sustainment Support Battalion, in Benicia
        - Headquarters and Headquarters Company, 749th Division Sustainment Support Battalion, in Benicia
        - 756th Transportation Company (Medium Truck) (POL, 5K GAL), in Lancaster
          - Detachment 1, 756th Transportation Company (Medium Truck) (POL, 5K GAL), at March Air Reserve Base
        - 1072nd Transportation Company (Medium Truck) (PLS), at Hammer Army Airfield
        - 1113th Transportation Company (Medium Truck) (Cargo), in San Jose
        - Detachment 1, 1836th Transportation Company (Combat HET), at March Air Reserve Base
        - 2632nd Transportation Company (Light-Medium Truck), in Sacramento
        - 2668th Transportation Company (Medium Truck) (Cargo), in Oroville
        - 5002nd Quartermaster Company (Field Feeding), in Long Beach
          - Detachment 1, 5002nd Quartermaster Company (Field Feeding), at Camp Roberts
          - Detachment 2, 5002nd Quartermaster Company (Field Feeding), in Fairfield
          - Detachment 3, 5002nd Quartermaster Company (Field Feeding), at Hammer Army Airfield
  - 49th Military Police Brigade, in Fairfield
    - Headquarters and Headquarters Company, 49th Military Police Brigade, in Fairfield
    - 143rd Military Police Battalion, in Los Angeles
      - Headquarters and Headquarters Detachment, 143rd Military Police Battalion, in Los Angeles
      - 40th Military Police Company (Combat Support), at Joint Forces Training Base – Los Alamitos
      - 140th Chemical Company, in Gardena
      - 330th Military Police Company (Combat Support), in Ontario
      - 670th Military Police Company (Combat Support), in National City
    - 185th Military Police Battalion, in Pittsburg
      - Headquarters and Headquarters Detachment, 185th Military Police Battalion, in Pittsburg
      - 149th Chemical Company, in Lathrop
      - 270th Military Police Company (Combat Support), in Sacramento
      - 870th Military Police Company (Combat Support), in Concord
    - 579th Engineer Battalion, in Santa Rosa
      - Headquarters and Headquarters Company, 579th Engineer Battalion, in Santa Rosa
      - Forward Support Company, 579th Engineer Battalion, in Santa Rosa
      - 129th Engineer Detachment (Concrete Section), at Camp Roberts
      - 132nd Engineer Company (Multirole Bridge), in Redding
      - 216th Engineer Company (Mobility Augmentation Company), at March Air Reserve Base
      - 217th Ordnance Company (EOD), at Camp Roberts (part of 741st Ordnance Battalion (EOD))
      - 235th Engineer Company (Sapper), in Petaluma
      - 315th Engineer Company (Vertical Construction Company), at March Air Reserve Base
      - 649th Engineer Company (Engineer Construction Company), in Chico
        - Detachment 1, 649th Engineer Company (Engineer Construction Company), in Red Bluff
        - Detachment 2, 649th Engineer Company (Engineer Construction Company), in Sacramento
      - 1401st Engineer Platoon (Quarry), at Camp Roberts
  - 100th Troop Command, in Rancho Cordova
    - Headquarters and Headquarters Company, 100th Troop Command, in Rancho Cordova
    - Company C, 1st Battalion, 19th Special Forces Group (Airborne), at Joint Forces Training Base – Los Alamitos
    - Special Operations Detachment-North (Airborne), at Joint Forces Training Base – Los Alamitos
    - 128th Quartermaster Detachment (Aerial Delivery), at Joint Forces Training Base – Los Alamitos
    - Detachment 1, Headquarters and Headquarters Battery, 100th Missile Defense Brigade (Ground-Based Midcourse Defense), at Vandenberg Space Force Base
    - 369th Judge Advocate General Detachment, in Bell
    - 370th Judge Advocate General Detachment, in Bell
    - 472nd Judge Advocate General Detachment, in Rancho Cordova
    - 629th Judge Advocate General Detachment, in Rancho Cordova
    - 1st Battalion, 144th Field Artillery Regiment, in Van Nuys (M109A6 Paladin) (part of 115th Field Artillery Brigade)
      - Headquarters and Headquarters Battery, 1st Battalion, 144th Field Artillery Regiment, in Van Nuys
      - Battery A, 1st Battalion, 144th Field Artillery Regiment, in Azusa
      - Battery B, 1st Battalion, 144th Field Artillery Regiment, in Van Nuys
      - Battery C, 1st Battalion, 144th Field Artillery Regiment, in El Cajon
      - 11th Forward Support Company, in Van Nuys
    - 1st Battalion, 185th Infantry Regiment, in San Bernardino (part of 81st Stryker Brigade Combat Team)
      - Headquarters and Headquarters Company, 1st Battalion, 185th Infantry Regiment, in San Bernardino
        - Detachment 2, Headquarters and Headquarters Battery, 2nd Battalion, 146th Field Artillery Regiment, in San Bernardino
      - Company A, 1st Battalion, 185th Infantry Regiment, in Apple Valley
      - Company B, 1st Battalion, 185th Infantry Regiment, in Colton
      - Company C, 1st Battalion, 185th Infantry Regiment, in Palmdale
      - Company H (Forward Support), 181st Brigade Support Battalion, in Barstow
    - 223rd Military Intelligence Battalion (Linguist), in San Francisco (part of 300th Military Intelligence Brigade (Linguist))
      - Headquarters and Headquarters Company, 223rd Military Intelligence Battalion (Linguist), in San Francisco
      - Company A, 223rd Military Intelligence Battalion (Linguist), in San Rafael
      - Company B, 223rd Military Intelligence Battalion (Linguist), in San Francisco
      - Company C, 223rd Military Intelligence Battalion (Linguist), in San Rafael
      - Company D, 223rd Military Intelligence Battalion (Linguist), in Washington, D.C. (District of Columbia Army National Guard)
    - 250th Military Intelligence Battalion, in Long Beach (part of 71st Military Intelligence Brigade (Expeditionary))
      - Headquarters and Headquarters Company, 250th Military Intelligence Battalion, in Long Beach
      - Company A, 250th Military Intelligence Battalion, at Joint Forces Training Base – Los Alamitos
      - Company B, 250th Military Intelligence Battalion, in Long Beach
  - 115th Regional Support Group, in Roseville
    - Headquarters and Headquarters Company, 115th Regional Support Group, in Roseville
    - 69th Public Affairs Detachment, in Roseville
    - 142nd Chaplain Detachment, in Roseville
    - Cyber Protection Team 171, at Camp San Luis Obispo
    - 184th Engineer Detachment (Construction Management Team), in Roseville
    - 217th Financial Management Support Detachment, in Sacramento
    - 223rd Financial Management Support Detachment, in Pomona
    - 224th Financial Management Support Detachment, in Pomona
    - 233rd Engineer Detachment (Fire Fighting Team — Fire Truck), at Camp Roberts
    - 251st Financial Management Support Detachment, in Ontario
    - 1933rd Support Detachment (Contracting Team), at Joint Forces Training Base – Los Alamitos
    - 1970th Support Detachment (Contracting Team), in Long Beach
    - 1977th Support Detachment (Contracting Team), in San Diego
    - 340th Brigade Support Battalion, in Seaside (part of 65th Field Artillery Brigade)
      - Headquarters Support Company, 340th Brigade Support Battalion, in Seaside
        - Detachment 1, Headquarters Support Company, 340th Brigade Support Battalion, at Camp Roberts
      - 49th Human Resources Company, in Sacramento
      - 159th Quartermaster Detachment (Tactical Water Distribution Team) (Hoseline), in Merced
      - 297th Medical Company, in San Mateo
      - 1040th Quartermaster Company (Water Purification and Distribution), in Hollister
        - Detachment 1, 1040th Quartermaster Company (Water Purification and Distribution), in Merced
  - 1106th Theater Aviation Sustainment Maintenance Group, at Hammer Army Airfield
    - Headquarters and Headquarters Detachment, 1106th Theater Aviation Sustainment Maintenance Group, at Hammer Army Airfield
    - Company A (Aviation Support), 1106th Theater Aviation Sustainment Maintenance Group, at Hammer Army Airfield
    - Company B (Ground Support), 1106th Theater Aviation Sustainment Maintenance Group, at Hammer Army Airfield
  - 223rd Regiment, Regional Training Institute, at Camp San Luis Obispo
    - Regional Training Site-Maintenance, at Camp Roberts

Aviation unit abbreviations: CAC — Command Aviation Company; MEDEVAC — Medical evacuation; AVUM — Aviation Unit Maintenance; AVIM — Aviation Intermediate Maintenance; ATS — Air Traffic Service

== See also ==
- Army National Guard Transformation – links to source material on transformation of the CA ARNG.
- California State Guard
- California Military Academy
- List of armored and cavalry regiments of the United States Army
- Militia
- 25th Infantry Division (United States)
- United States Army Reserve
