= 224th =

224th may refer to:

- 224th (Parachute) Field Ambulance, a Royal Army Medical Corps unit of the British airborne forces during the Second World War
- 224th Battalion, CEF, a unit in the Canadian Expeditionary Force during the First World War
- 224th Joint Communications Support Squadron (JCSS), provides deployable tactical communications for JTF and JSOTF Headquarters
- 224th Sustainment Brigade (United States), a sustainment brigade of the United States Army and the California Army National Guard

== See also ==
- 224 (number)
- 224, the year 224 (CCXXIV) of the Julian calendar
- 224 BC
