= Southland Credit Union =

- Type: Credit union
- Founded: 1936
- Headquarters: Los Alamitos, California, United States
- Number of locations: 11 Branches
- Area served: Orange County and Los Angeles, California
- Total assets: $1.3b USD (2025)
- Website: southlandcu.org

Southland Credit Union is a not-for-profit community-chartered credit union in California, United States serving the residents of Orange County and Los Angeles County. They have over 70,000 members and $1.3 billion in assets. Southland Credit Union's member-owners get a full spectrum of financial products. Southland Credit Union was founded in 1936 to serve the financial needs of Los Angeles County employees.

== History ==
- 1936 - Southland Credit Union established to serve the employees of the Los Angeles County Flood Control District with seven volunteers.
- 1944 - State charter granted; name is changed to "Los Angeles County Civic Center Credit Union."
- 1981 - Corporate office moved from Los Angeles to Downey.
- 1989 - Merged with Auto Pro Federal Credit Union, South Coast Medical Center Federal Credit Union and Mobilehome Owners Federal Credit Union
- 1991 - Merged with Graphic Arts Credit Union.
- 1994 - Name changed to "Southland Civic Federal Credit Union" and the Credit Union received a federal charter. Merged with Los Angeles County Bar Association Credit Union.
- 1991 - Merged with Saints Federal Credit Union.
- 1996 - Merged with Sunrise First Federal Credit Union, which served the employees of Simpson Paper Company.
- 1999 - Converted back to a state charter with a name changed to "Southland Civic Credit Union" and completed a merger with Los Angeles Internal Revenue Service Employees Federal Credit Union.
- 2001 - Merged with FAMCO Federal Credit Union, which served the employees of AMERON, now National Oilwell Varco.
- 2002 - Name changed to "Southland Credit Union" and corporate office is moved to Los Alamitos.
- 2009 - Merged with Cityside Federal Credit Union, formally the Los Angeles Times Federal Credit Union.
- 2011 - Acquired the Garden Grove branch of Fullerton Community Bank.
- 2012 - Merged with Santa Monica City Employees Federal Credit Union.
- 2014 - Merged with Westside Employees Federal Credit Union, which served the employees of Saint John's Health Center in Santa Monica and merged with Patriots Federal Credit Union in Tustin, which served legacy military personnel stationed at Marine Corps Air Station El Toro.
- 2017 - Merged with Harbor Federal Credit Union, which served the employees of Harbor–UCLA Medical Center in Carson.
- 2024 - Merged with Allied Healthcare Federal Credit Union, which served healthcare workers at Long Beach Memorial Medical Center, St. Mary Medical Center (Long Beach), and St. Francis Medical Center (Lynwood)
