= 40th Division Sustainment Brigade =

- 40th Infantry Division Shoulder Sleeve Insignia (SSI), worn by the 40th Division Sustainment Brigade
- Active: Present
- Country: United States
- Allegiance: California
- Branch: United States Army National Guard
- Role: Sustainment
- Size: Brigade
- Part of: California Army National Guard, 40th Infantry Division
- Garrison/HQ: Long Beach Armory
- Nickname: "Dragon Slayers"
- Motto: Serviens Semper (Always Serving)

Commanders
- Current commander: COL Barbara J. Beegles
- Command Sergeant Major: CSM Samuel P. Yudin

Insignia
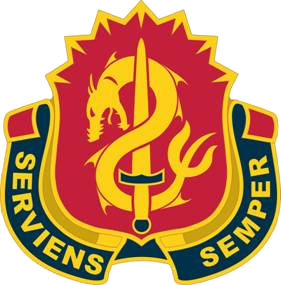
- The brigade's distinctive unit insignia

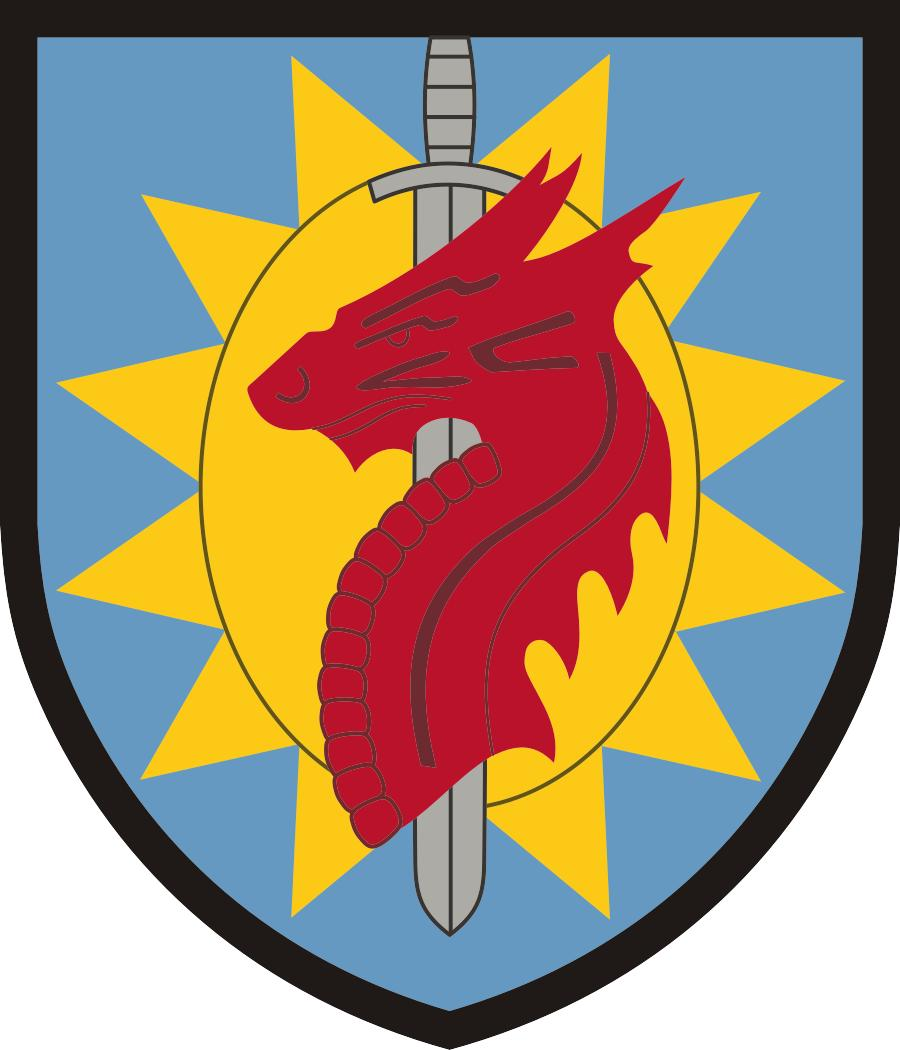
- Former 224th Sustainment Brigade SSI

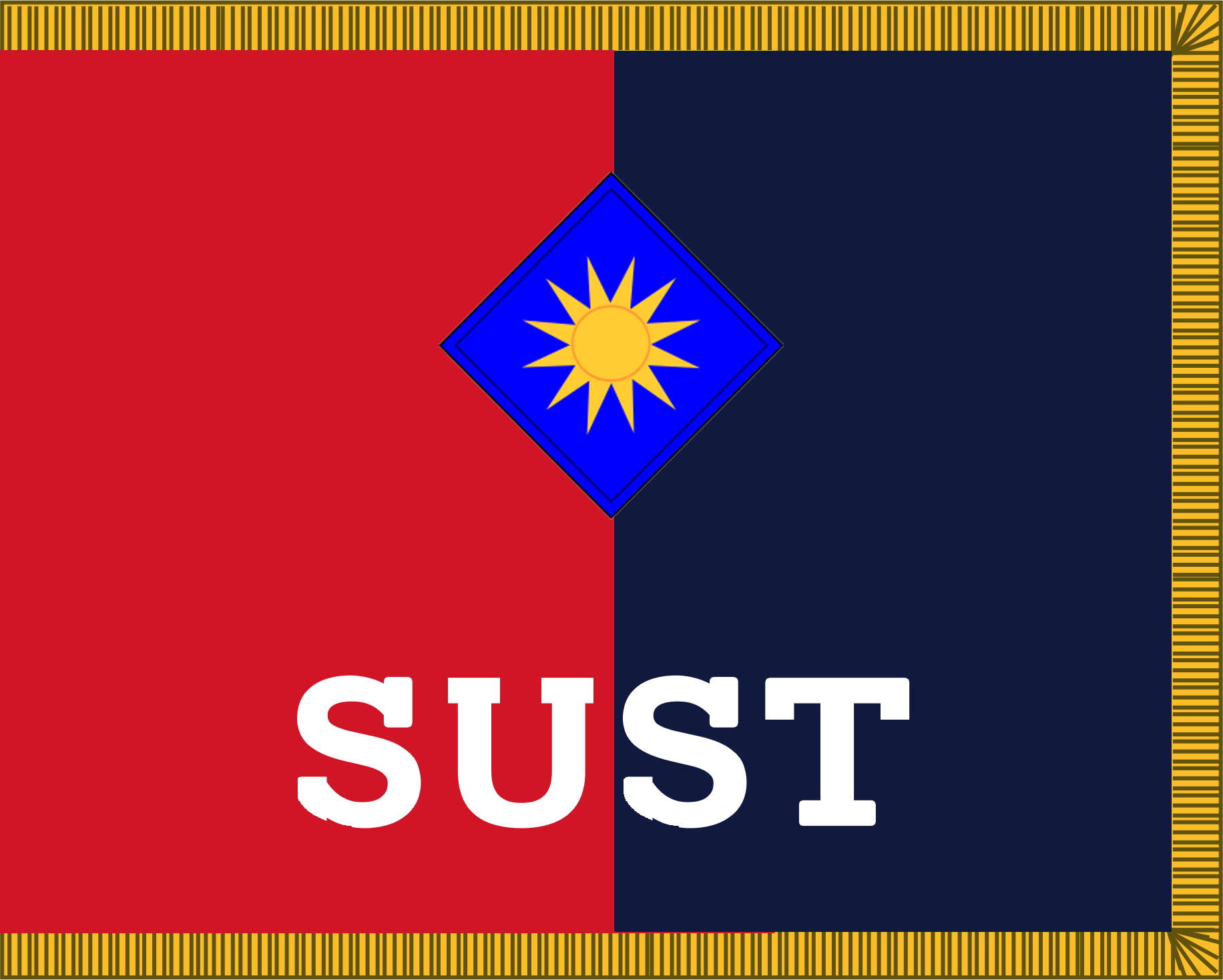
- 40th Division Sustainment Brigade Flag

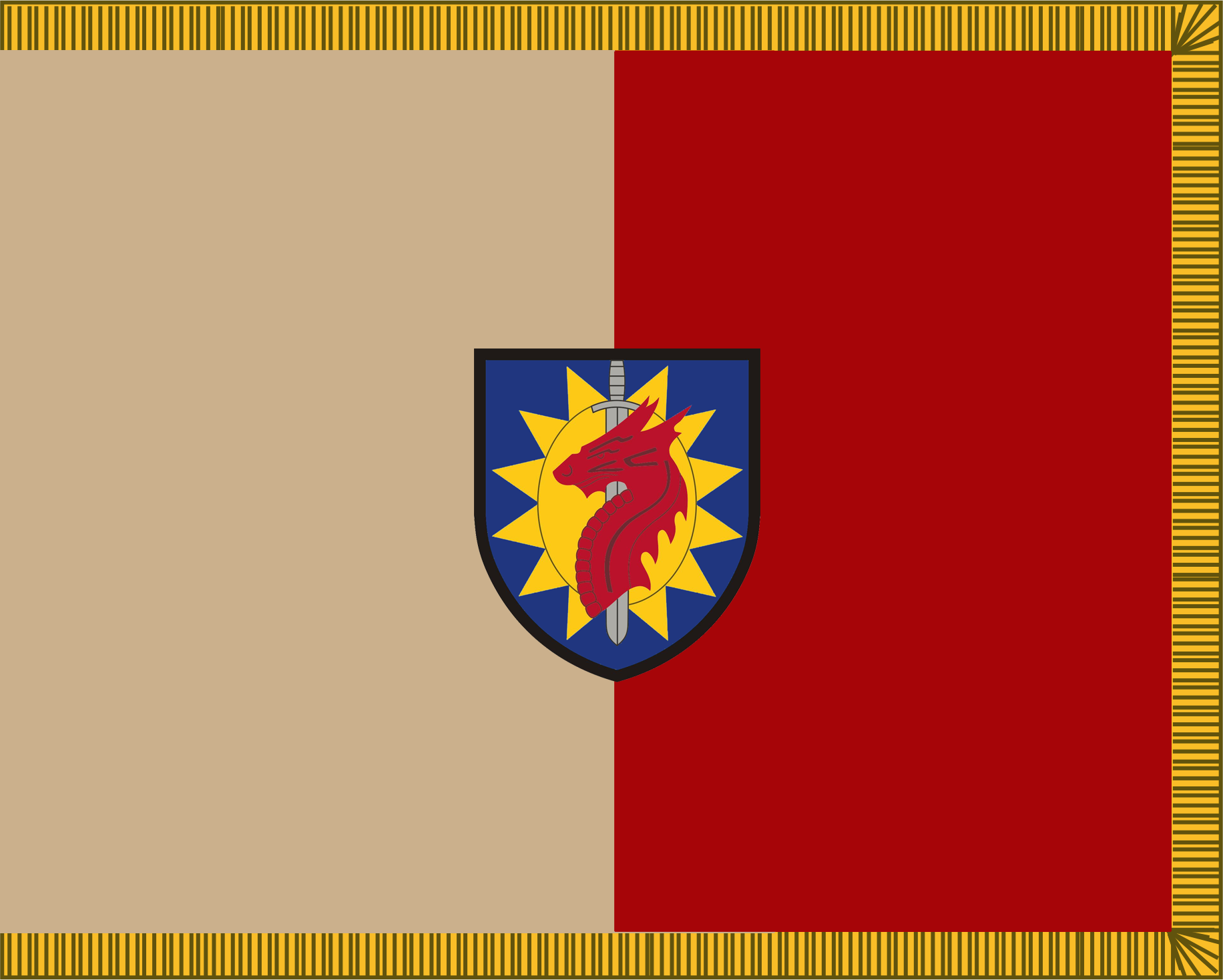
- Former 224th Sustainment Brigade flag

The 40th Division Sustainment Brigade (former 224th Sustainment Brigade) is a sustainment brigade of the United States Army and the California Army National Guard, which is assigned to the 40th Infantry Division.

== Organization ==
- 40th Division Sustainment Brigade, in Long Beach (CA) (California Army National Guard)
  - 40th Division Sustainment Troops Battalion, in Long Beach (CA)
    - Headquarters and Headquarters Company, 40th Division Sustainment Brigade, in Long Beach (CA)
    - 240th Signal Company, in Long Beach (CA)
  - 746th Division Sustainment Support Battalion, in Burbank (CA)
    - Headquarters and Headquarters Company, 746th Division Sustainment Support Battalion, in Burbank (CA)
    - Company A (Composite Supply Company), 746th Division Sustainment Support Battalion, in Vallejo (CA)
      - Detachment 1, Company A, 746th Division Sustainment Support Battalion, at Camp San Luis Obispo (CA)
      - Detachment 2, Company A, 746th Division Sustainment Support Battalion, in Bakersfield (CA)
    - Company B (Support Maintenance Company), 746th Division Sustainment Support Battalion, at Stockton Army Airfield (CA)
      - Detachment 1, Company B, 746th Division Sustainment Support Battalion, in Pomona (CA)
    - Company C (Composite Truck Company), 746th Division Sustainment Support Battalion, in Bakersfield (CA)
      - Detachment 1, Company C, 746th Division Sustainment Support Battalion, in Burbank (CA)
  - 749th Division Sustainment Support Battalion, in Benicia (CA)
    - Headquarters and Headquarters Company, 749th Division Sustainment Support Battalion, in Benicia (CA)
    - 756th Transportation Company (Medium Truck) (POL, 5K GAL), in Lancaster (CA)
      - Detachment 1, 756th Transportation Company (Medium Truck) (POL, 5K GAL), at March Air Reserve Base (CA)
    - 1072nd Transportation Company (Medium Truck) (PLS), at Hammer Airfield (CA)
    - 1113th Transportation Company (Medium Truck) (Cargo), in San Jose (CA)
    - Detachment 1, 1836th Transportation Company (Combat HET), at March Air Reserve Base (CA)
    - 2632nd Transportation Company (Light-Medium Truck), in Sacramento (CA)
    - 2668th Transportation Company (Medium Truck) (Cargo), in Oroville (CA)
    - 5002nd Quartermaster Company (Field Feeding), in Long Beach (CA)
      - Detachment 1, 5002nd Quartermaster Company (Field Feeding), at Camp Roberts (CA)
      - Detachment 2, 5002nd Quartermaster Company (Field Feeding), in Fairfield (CA)
      - Detachment 3, 5002nd Quartermaster Company (Field Feeding), at Hammer Airfield (CA)
