= 140th Aviation Regiment =

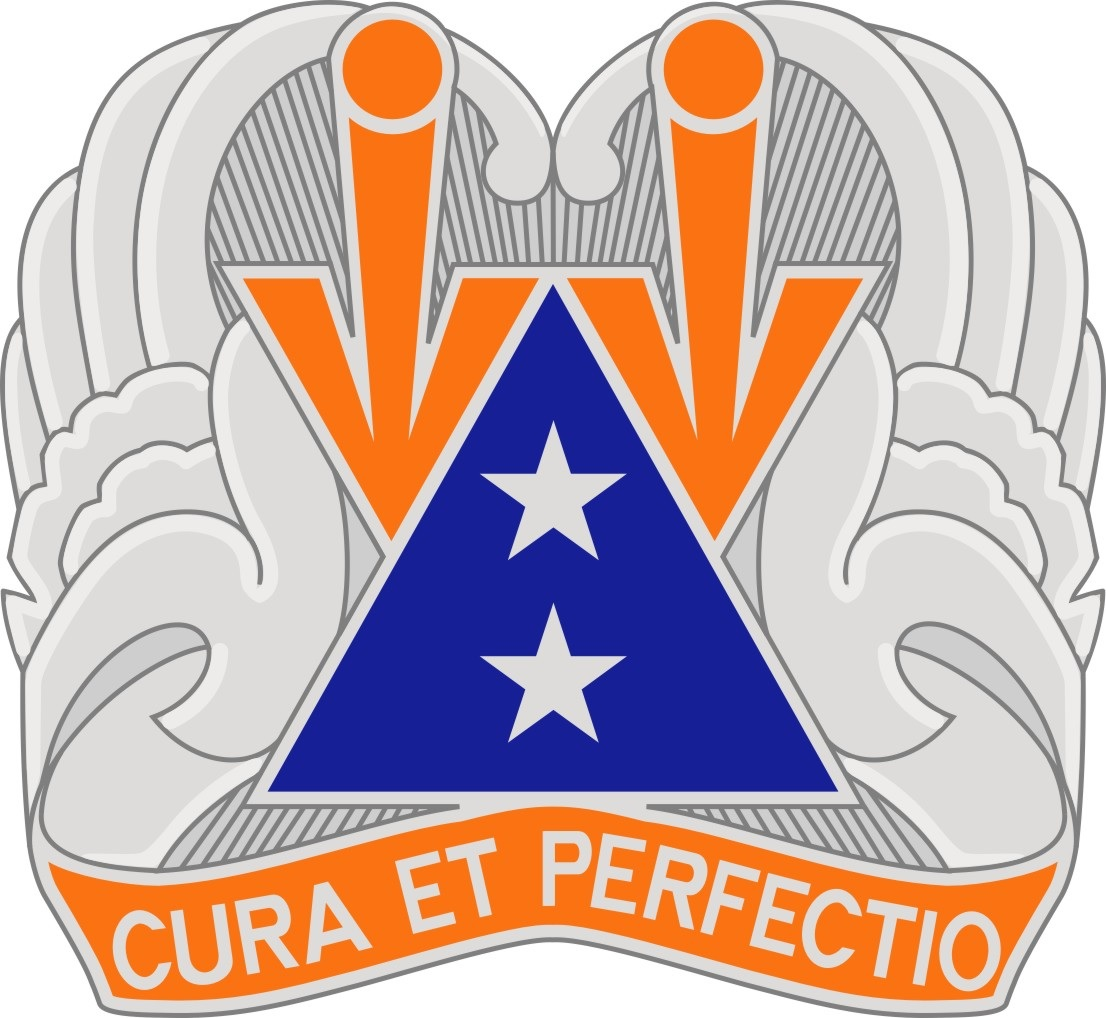
- coat of arms
- Active: 1987–present
- Country: United States
- Branch: United States Army Aviation Branch
- Type: Aviation
- Garrison/HQ: Joint Forces Training Base Los Alamitos
- Engagements: Iraq War

Aircraft flown
- Utility helicopter: UH-60L Black Hawk; UH-72A Lakota

The 140th Aviation Regiment is an aviation regiment of the U.S. Army. It has historically been associated with the California Army National Guard's 40th Infantry Division.

Previous aviation units in the California Army National Guard included the 140th Aviation Battalion, the 29th Aviation Company, and the 40th Aviation Company, which was mobilized for Vietnam service in 1968-69.

Its official Lineage and Honors states:

- Constituted 31 July 1987 in the California Army National Guard as the 140th Aviation, a parent regiment under the United States Army Regimental System
- Organized 1 October 1987 from existing units to consist of the 1st Battalion and Companies D, E, and F, elements of the 40th Infantry Division, and Company G
- Reorganized 1 March 1988 to consist of the 1st Battalion and Companies D, E, and F, elements of the 40th Infantry Division, the 3d Battalion, and Company G
- Reorganized 1 September 1996 to consist of the 1st Battalion and Company F, elements of the 40th Infantry Division, the 3d Battalion, and Company G

== History ==
In 1994, the regiment's 1st Battalion and Companies D (Command), E (Assault), and F (Aviation Intermediate Maintenance) were part of the 40th Division's Aviation Brigade, along with the 1st Squadron of the 18th Cavalry Regiment.

== Current structure ==
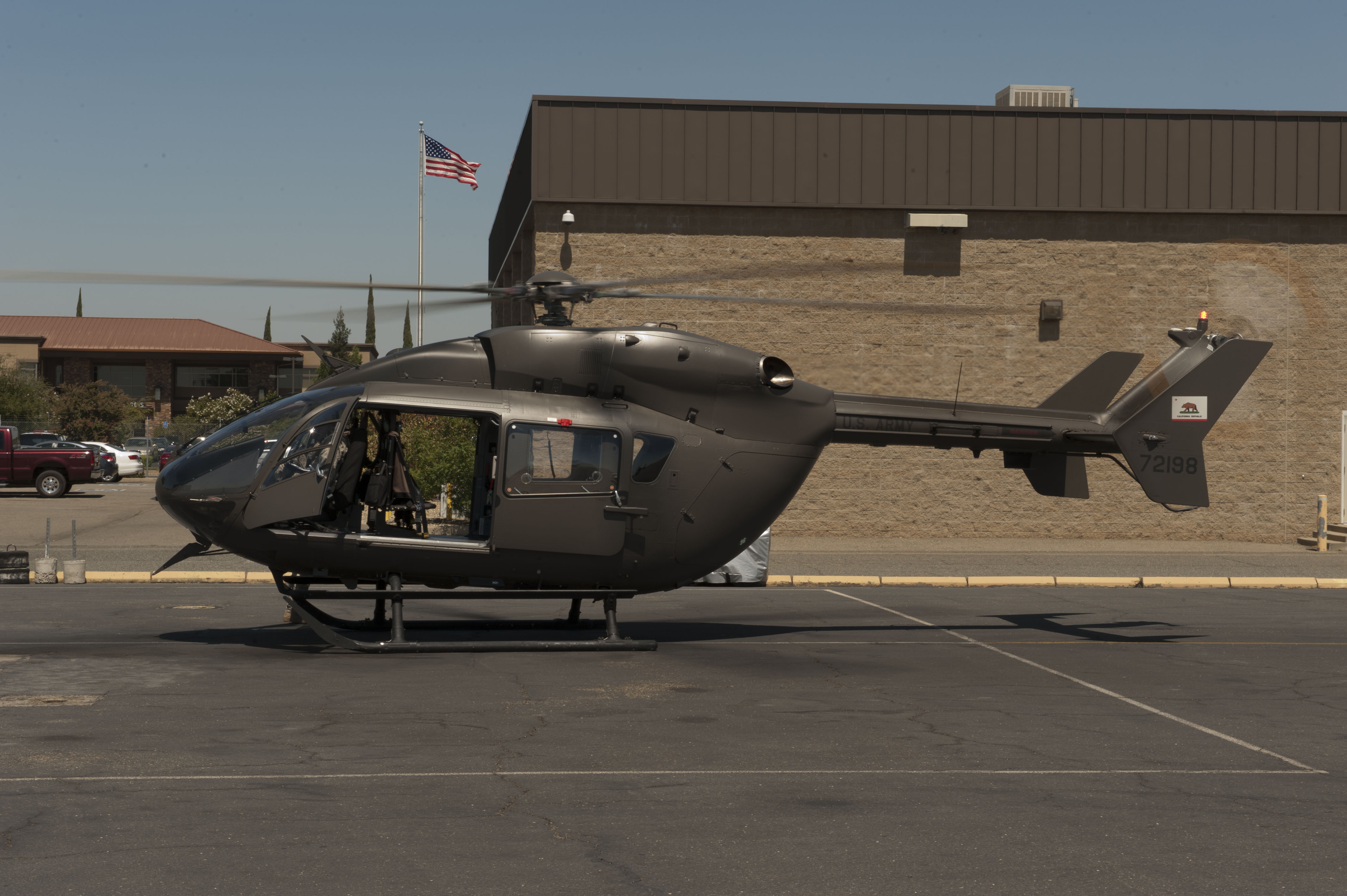
A U.S. Soldier with the 3rd Battalion, 140th Aviation Regiment, California Army National Guard

- 1st Battalion (Assault) (UH-60) (CA ARNG, (Joint Forces Training Base - Los Alamitos)
  - Company A (Joint Forces Training Base - Los Alamitos)
  - Company B
  - Company C (Fort Lewis, Washington)
    - Iraq SEP 2007-JUL 2008
- 3rd Battalion (Security & Support) (UH-72A) (CA ARNG) at Army Aviation Support Facility, Stockton Metropolitan Airport
  - Company B (UH-72A/B) at Army Aviation Support Facility, Buckley Space Force Base (CO ARNG)
    - Detachment 1 (UH-72A) at Limited Army Aviation Support Facility at North Las Vegas Airport (NV ARNG)
  - Company C (UH-72A) (NM ARNG) at the Army Aviation Operations Facility, Las Cruces International Airport.
    - Detachment 1 at Oklahoma City (OK ARNG)
  - Company D (UH-72A) (Air Ambulance) at Army Aviation Support Facility, Buckley Space Force Base (CO ARNG)
    - Detachment 1 (UH-72A) at Limited Army Aviation Support Facility, North Las Vegas Airport (NV ARNG)
