= Camp Roberts, California =

California National Guard post

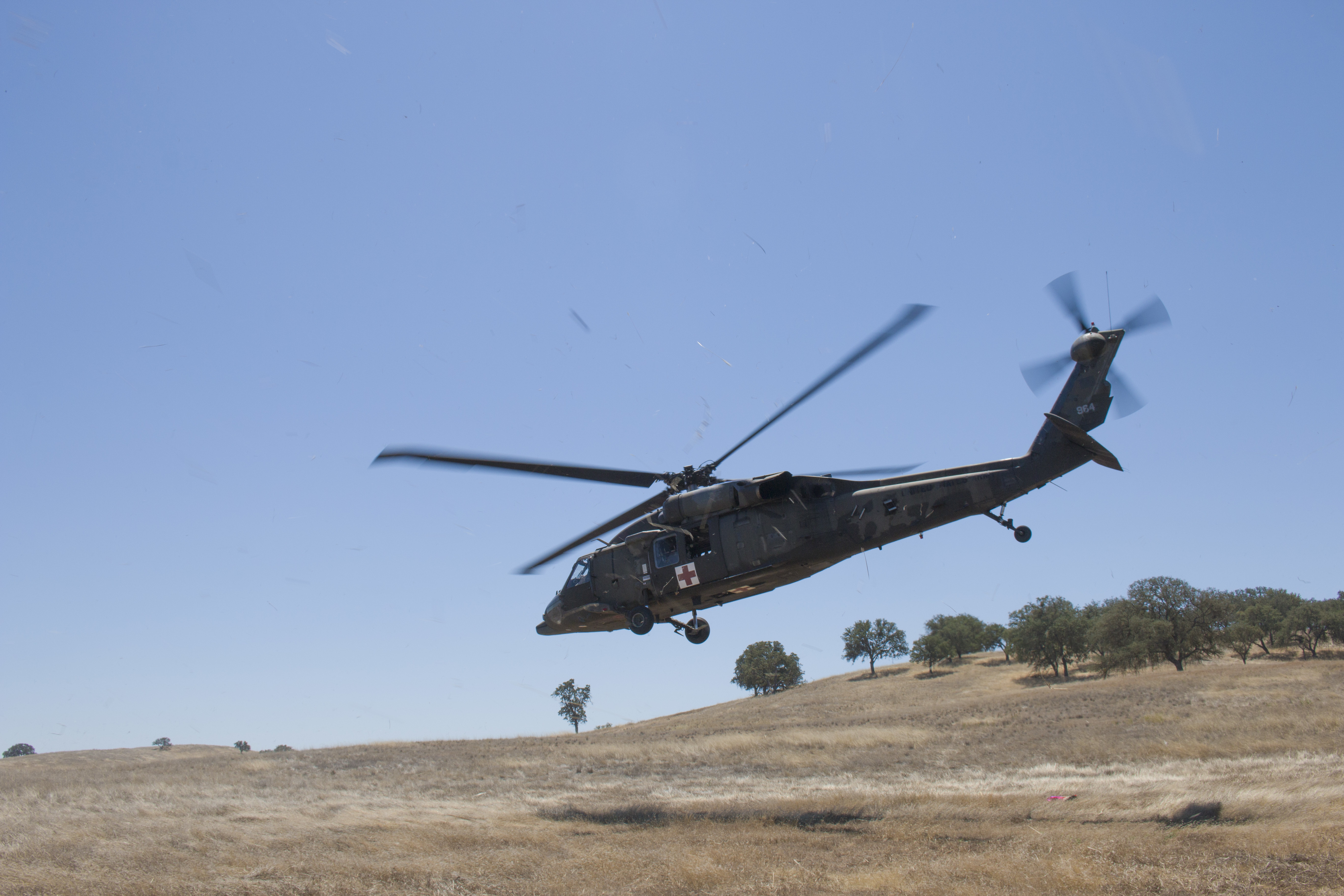
MEDEVAC at Camp Roberts by a UH-60 of the 140th Aviation Regiment in 2015

Camp Roberts is a California National Guard post in central California, located on both sides of the Salinas River in Monterey and San Luis Obispo counties, now run by the California Army National Guard. It was opened in 1941 and is named after Corporal Harold W. Roberts, a World War I Medal of Honor recipient. Nearby communities include San Miguel, Heritage Ranch (Lake Nacimiento), Oak Shores (Lake Nacimiento), and Bradley, all unincorporated. The nearest incorporated city is Paso Robles. Camp Roberts is roughly 25 miles (40 kilometers) southeast of Fort Hunter Liggett.

Camp Roberts is host to annual training for California Army National Guard units and the British Army.

Trees on ridge above the Camp Roberts Known Distance Range

As of 2014, Camp Roberts is undergoing major renovations, including demolition of World War II-era barracks. Demolition of the World War II-era structures facing US Route 101 began in 2012. To contain the hazardous materials from the demolished barracks, a large hazardous waste landfill was created.

Camp Roberts water tower

== History ==
Under the leadership Lieutenant Colonel Oliver Martson the camp was built in 1940, as a World War II training center. At its peak it housed 45,000 troops in 1945. The camp opened as the Camp Nacimiento Replacement Training Center, but the name was changed, to honor Corporal Harold W. Roberts, a tank driver in World War I who was posthumously awarded the Medal of Honor. For World War II 436,000 Infantry and Field Artillery troops were trained at the camp. Camp Roberts was one of the largest training camps during World War II. At the camp a 750-bed Army hospital was built to serve the troops. The camp also held prisoners of war. German and Italian prisoners of war were held at the camp during WWII. Italian prisoners of war were given the option to volunteer to work in special Italian Service Unit and work at Camp Roberts' 10th Italian Quartermaster Service Company. After the war the camp was inactive, but for the few National Guard and Army Reserve troops that used it for summer training. In 1950 for the Korean War the camp became active again. After the Korean War the camp was inactive again. The US Army's Combat Development Experimental Command began to operate the camp for weapons testing. The US Navy used the vast camp training gunners with live fire. In April 1970 the US Army closed the army camp. The camp was turned over to the California National Guard in 1971 for a training center.

SPC Mechikoff participating the 2nd annual California Army National guard Marksmanship Competition.

- Camp Roberts Historical Museum is on the base.
- From 1955 to 1990 at 35.790°N 120.74°W the US Army operated Camp Roberts Main Army Airfield. This was a single northwest–southeast 3,000-foot (910-meter) paved runway and a control tower. The runway was on the southeast side of the Camp Roberts parade ground. The runway today is vacant, has one building left on it and is partly used for a parking lot.
- From 1951 to 1955 at 35.785°N 120.721°W the US Army operated Camp Roberts Army Airfield. This was a single northwest–southeast 1,700 feet (520 m) dirt runway. The runway was on the southeast side of the base, running parallel to the Salinas river. There is no trace of this original base runway today, just brush alongside the river.

Sign on the back of the range

Soldiers who used the range before deploying, would sign their name here.

Soldiers who used the range before deploying, would sign their name here.

== See also ==
- Camp Laguna Arizona proving ground in WW2
- Yuma Test Branch Arizona proving ground in WW2
- Yuma Proving Ground current Arizona proving ground
- California during World War II
