= 224th Infantry Regiment =

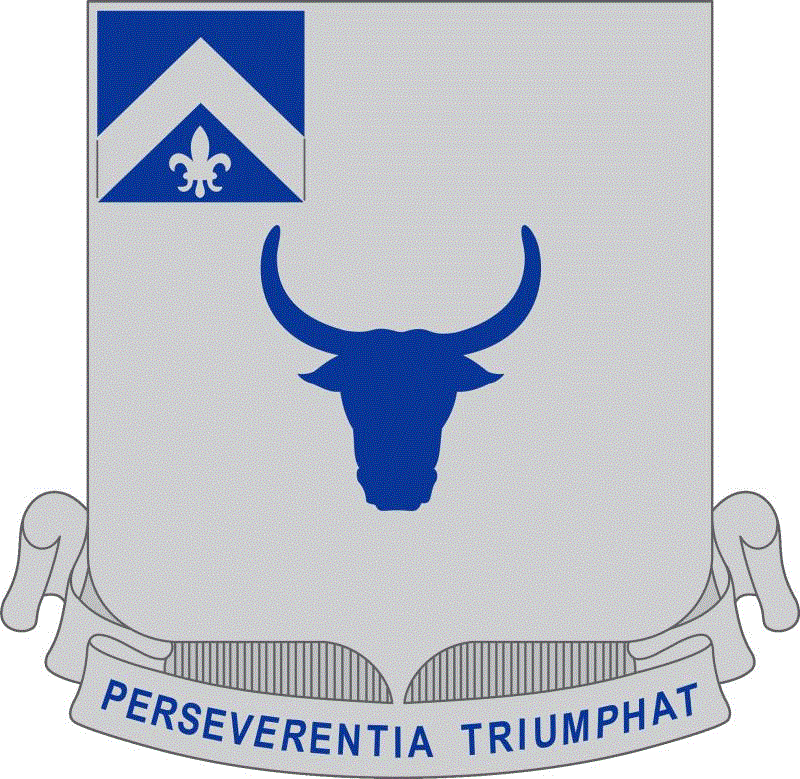
- Active: 15 October 1946-30 June 1954
- Allegiance: United States
- Branch: United States Army
- Type: Infantry
- Size: Regiment
- Part of: California Army National Guard
- Engagements: Korean War
- Decorations: Korean Presidential Unit Citation

Commanders
- Notable commanders: James L. Richardson; Hugh P. Harris; George T. Duncan; Louis A. Walsh Jr.

The 224th Infantry Regiment was a regiment of the United States Army. It was formed in 1946 from the 3rd Battalion of the 185th Infantry of the California National Guard. The regiment was part of the 40th Infantry Division during wartime and a unit of the California National Guard during peacetime.

The regiment was called into federal service and fought in the Korean War. It was returned to state control on 30 June 1954 and was broken up the following day.

== Origins ==
The regiment can trace its history back to the 7th Infantry Regiment (California). In 1917, the 7th Infantry Regiment (California) consolidated with elements of the 2nd Infantry Regiment (California) to form the 160th Infantry Regiment. On 1 April 1929, the 2nd Battalion of the 160th was reorganized to form the 2nd Battalion of the 185th Infantry Regiment. In March and April 1930, the 2nd Battalion of the 185th expanded to become the 2nd and 3rd Battalions of the 185th. During World War II, the 185th fought in the New Britain campaign and in the Philippines Campaign. Postwar, it was decided the California could support a second National Guard division, the 49th Infantry Division, composed of the 159th, 184th and 185th Infantry Regiments. The 40th Infantry Division was composed of the 160th, 223rd and 224th Infantry Regiments. The 223rd Infantry was formed from the 2nd Battalion of the 185th Infantry Regiment. The 224th Infantry Regiment was formed on 15 October 1946 in Ontario, California from the 185th Infantry Regiment's 3rd Battalion.

== Korean War ==
On 1 September 1950, the 40th Infantry Division became part of the active army from the National Guard. After training, the division was transported to Japan in March 1951. It was part of XVI Corps at Camp Schemmelfenning. On 7 January 1952, the division relieved the 24th Infantry Division and was transferred to Korea. The regiment was commanded by Colonel James L. Richardson, nicknamed Walking Jim. Landing at Incheon on 3 February, the 224th relieved the 5th Regimental Combat Team on 10 February in the IX Corps sector.

Company L of the 3rd Battalion regiment conducted a limited predawn raid against Chinese-held bunkers and entrenchments along a ridge known as The Boot on 18 February. Supported by 22 tanks from the regimental tank company, the heavy weapons company of the 3rd Battalion (Company M), and three Quad 50s from the 140th Anti-Aircraft Artillery Battalion, the company attacked with two platoons in the lead and a third in reserve. Richardson, with his radio operator, personally accompanied one of the lead platoons. While the tanks suppressed the Chinese bunkers, the infantry moved forward under mortar and artillery bombardment, which was countered by the 40th Division artillery. A platoon commander was killed by mortar fragments, while Richardson's radio operator was mortally wounded on the ridge. Richardson, who was slightly wounded, carried his radio operator down to a tank at the bottom of the ridge for evacuation, after deciding to disengage. The company withdrew under mortar fire, having lost four killed, two missing, and thirty wounded, while claiming enemy casualties of 27 confirmed killed, 46 estimated killed, and 65 estimated wounded. The 224th's tank company destroyed ten enemy bunkers in an action at the end of February.

After the division relieved the 2nd ROK Infantry Division during between 21 March and 30 March, the regiment was placed in reserve. On 3 April, the regiment was deployed onto the frontline due to a boundary change with the 2nd Infantry Division. The division was responsible for defending the Kumwha-Kaesong sector. On 30 June, the division was relieved by the 2nd ROK Infantry Division and was transferred to the rear. The 224th Infantry was moved to Pusan under the 2nd Logistical Command on 5 July to guard prisoners of war in the area. On 23 September, the regiment rejoined the division in the Kapyong area. On 22 October, the 224th relieved the 25th Infantry Division's 27th Infantry Regiment in the Paemihyonni sector, where it defended the frontline from enemy attacks.

On 2 September 1952, a replacement 224th Infantry Regiment was formed as a National Guard unit in Ontario. That regiment was disbanded when the original 224th returned to California on 30 June 1954.

The 224th was replaced in the line by the 45th Infantry Division's 180th Infantry Regiment on 28 January 1953 and moved to Imje in the X Corps rear. On 17 March, the 224th was attached to the 45th Infantry Division's reserve and moved up to Wondang-ni. The regiment relieved elements of the 20th ROK Division on 27 April and was transferred back to the 40th Infantry Division, defending the division's left flank on the Punchbowl. On 11 July, the division replaced the 45th Infantry Division and the 224th was deployed at the Sandbag Castle area. After the armistice, the division withdrew to the DMZ line. With casualties of 376 killed and 1,457 wounded, the 40th Infantry Division's casualties were the lowest of any American division during the Korean War. The 224th Regiment itself had casualties of 98 killed.

== Postwar ==
The 224th returned with the division to California and reverted to state control on 30 June 1954. The following day, the regiment was broken up and its 1st Battalion became the 224th Armored Infantry Battalion while the 3rd Battalion was converted to the 161st Armored Infantry Battalion. On 1 July 1959, the 224th Armored Infantry Battalion consolidated with the 160th and 223rd Armored Infantry Battalions to form the 160th Infantry Regiment. The 160th Infantry Regiment was a parent unit under the Combat Arms Regimental System, part of the 40th Armored Division. The newly formed regiment consisted of the 1st, 2nd, 3rd and 4th Rifle Battalions.
