= 184th Infantry Regiment (United States) =

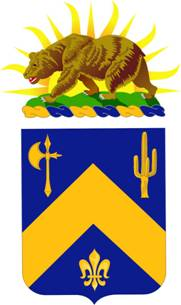
- Coat of arms
- Active: 1924–present
- Country: United States
- Branch: United States Army
- Type: Infantry
- Garrison/HQ: Modesto, California (HQ)
- Nicknames: "Night Stalkers" or "Second California"
- Motto: "Let's Go!"
- Engagements: World War I World War II; *Aleutian Islands; *Eastern Mandates; *Leyte; *Battle of Okinawa; Global War on Terrorism; Iraq Campaign; *Iraqi Governance; *National Resolution; *Iraqi Surge; *Iraqi Sovereignty; Kosovo Defense
- Battle honours: Philippine Pres. Unit Cit. Korean Pres. Unit Cit. Val. Unit Award

Commanders
- Commander: MAJ Serguei Louchnikov
- Command Sergeant Major: CSM Richard W. Aller

Insignia
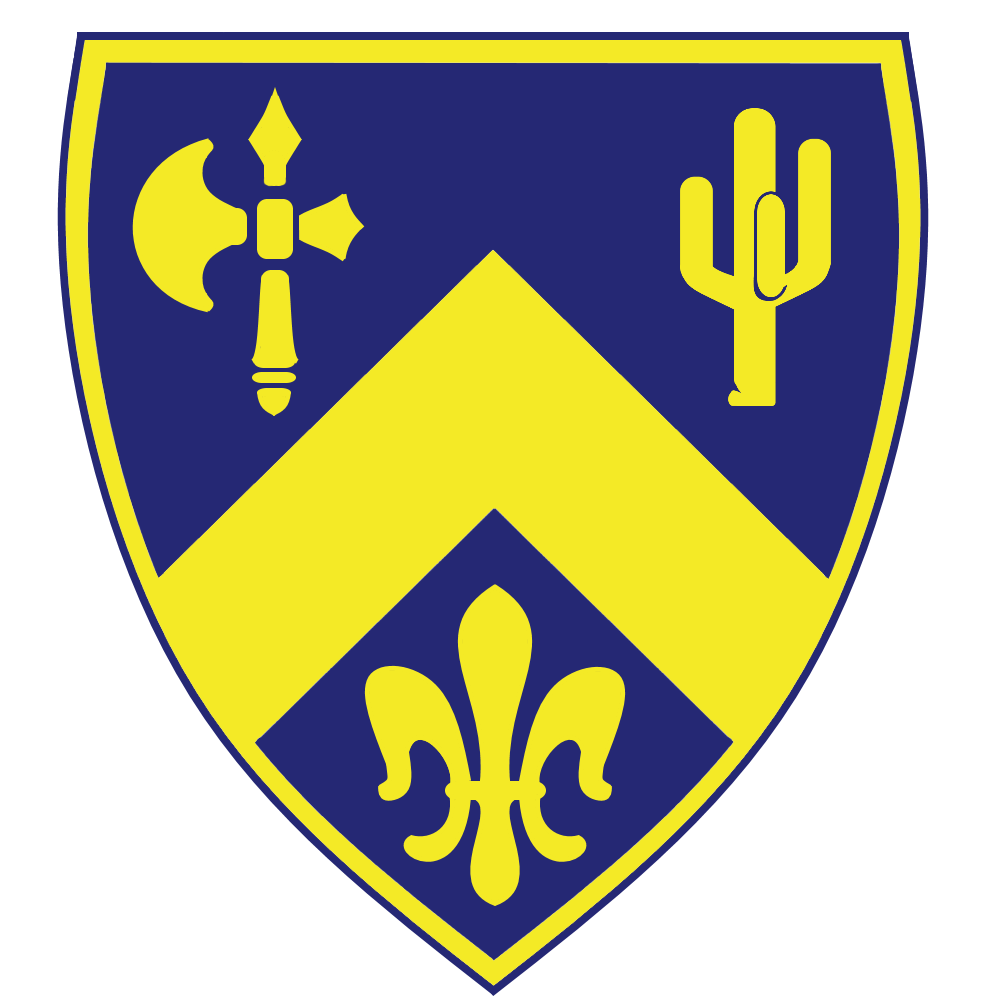
- Distinctive unit insignia

The 184th Infantry Regiment (Second California) is an infantry regiment of the United States Army consisting of soldiers from the California Army National Guard. Only the regiment's 1st Battalion remains an active military unit. The battalion supports state and federal missions in the State of California, United States of America and at overseas locations. The 184th Infantry Regiment can trace its lineage to the mid-19th century.

== Current status ==
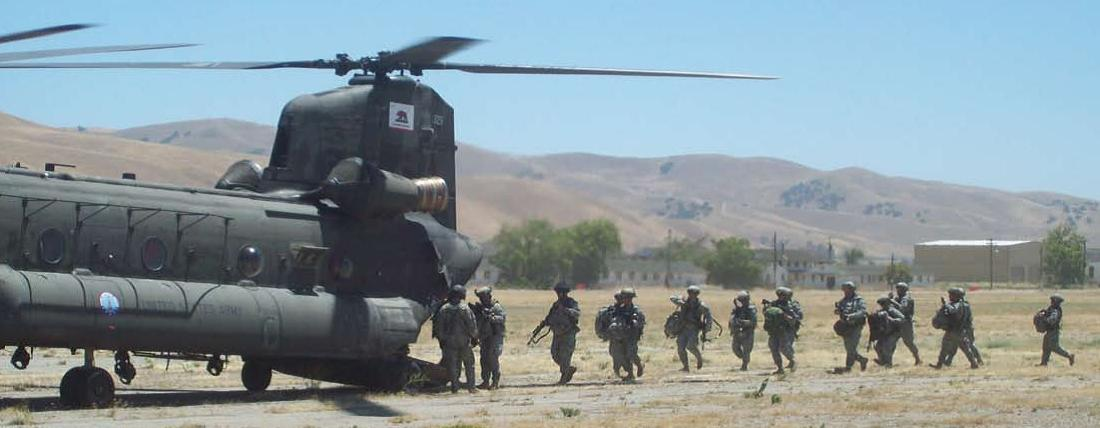
Soldiers from the 184th Infantry conduct Air Assault Training at Camp Roberts in June 2010.

The regiment's 1st Battalion is currently one of two infantry battalions in the 79th Infantry Brigade Combat Team. The battalion is currently conducting training and maintenance in order to prepare for future state and federal missions. In May 2012, the battalion conducted training in the National Training Center at Fort Irwin as part of the first Army National Guard brigade to rotate through the center's new training environment, designed to refocus the Army's training efforts as a result of the end of the Iraq War and the planned drawdown for the Afghanistan War.

== History ==
The 184th Infantry Regiment is a descendant of a number of unofficial militias that were formed in California in the mid-to-late-19th century. Bravo Company is the direct descendant of the Sarsfield Grenadier Guards. Charlie Company is the direct descendant of the Auburn Greys. In its dual role in service to both the United States of America and the State of California, the regiment can be mobilized to serve under state control.

The 184th Infantry Regiment was formed on 20 October 1924 from what had been known as the 2d Infantry Regiment (California).

=== 1864–95 Precursors to 2d Infantry (California) ===
On 9 December 1895, the 2d Infantry Regiment (California) was formed by consolidating the 1st Artillery Regiment (California) with the 8th Infantry Regiment (California). The headquarters of the 2d Infantry Regiment (California) was in Sacramento and the unit was part of the California National Guard. The lineage of these two units is described below.

1st Artillery Regiment (California). On 19 March 1880, the 1st Artillery Regiment (California) was formed from the consolidation of the Sacramento Light Artillery (California) and the 1st Infantry Battalion (California). The headquarters of the 1st Artillery Regiment (California) was in Sacramento and the unit was part of the California National Guard.

Sacramento Light Artillery (California). In 1864, the Sacramento Light Artillery (California) was formed from precursor militia elements in Sacramento as part of the California Militia. (Note: On 2 April 1866, the California Militia was redesignated as the California National Guard.)
1st Infantry Battalion (California). On 15 March 1872, the 4th Infantry Regiment (California) was formed from precursor militia elements, including the Sarsfield Grenadier Guards as G company, as part of the California National Guard. From 1875 through 1877, the 1st Infantry Battalion (California) was formed through the reduction, reorganization, and redesignation of the 4th Infantry Regiment (California). The headquarters of the 4th Infantry Regiment (California) was in Sacramento and the unit was part of the California National Guard.

8th Infantry Regiment (California). On 15 February 1890, the 8th Infantry Battalion (California) was formed from precursor militia elements with headquarters in Chico, as part of the California National Guard. On 31 October 1891, the 8th Infantry Regiment (California) was formed through the expansion, reorganization, and redesignation of the 8th Infantry Battalion (California). The headquarters of the 8th Infantry Regiment (California) was in Chico and the unit was part of the California National Guard.

=== 1895–1924 2d Infantry (California) ===
==== Spanish–American War ====
From 6–9 July 1898, three of the companies from the 2d Infantry Regiment (California) were mustered into federal service in Fruitvale as part of the 8th California Volunteer Infantry for service during the Spanish–American War. Although the units were mobilized for federal service, they never left the United States. From 28 January 1899 through 6 February 1899, the three companies were demobilized in Washington and California and returned to the 2d Infantry Regiment (California).

On 11 May 1907, the 2d Infantry Regiment (California) was reduced and consolidated with the 6th Infantry Regiment (California) (which had originally been organized on 22 July 1885 as the 6th Infantry Battalion (California)) to form the 2d Infantry Regiment (California), with headquarters in Sacramento, as part of the California National Guard.

==== 1916 Mexican Border Crisis ====
On 18 June 1916, the 2d Infantry Regiment (California) was mobilized for border security duty during the Mexican Border Crisis. On 15 November 1916, the unit was demobilized.

==== World War I ====
===== Mobilization, restructuring and training =====
On 26 March 1917, the 2d Infantry Regiment (California) was mobilized into federal service for World War I. Many of the units were well prepared for the mobilization because of the recent experience of mobilizing in support of the Mexican Border Crisis. In response to the consolidation of so many state militias, the United States Army created a new division system, and needed to fit the various state militias into the system. Originally, the 2d Infantry Regiment (California) was organized as part of the 19th Division, which consisted of various elements of state militias from Arizona, California, Colorado, Nevada, New Mexico, and Utah. On 16 September 1917, the 19th Division was redesignated as the 40th Division at Camp Kearny near San Diego, California. At that time, the division was referred to simply as the 40th Division because there were no armored or cavalry divisions.

On 24 September 1917, the 2d Infantry Regiment (less the 2d Battalion, Companies L and M, and the Sanitary Detachment) was consolidated with the 5th Infantry Regiment (California) and redesignated the 159th Infantry Regiment, 40th Division. On 25 September 1917, the 2d Infantry Regiment's 2d Battalion, companies L and M, and the Sanitary Detachment were consolidated with the 7th Infantry Regiment (California) and redesignated the 160th Infantry Regiment, 40th Division.

In November 1917, the 40th Division moved to continue training at either Camp Lewis near Seattle, Washington, which had finished construction and opened for training purposes only two months earlier, or Fort Funston near San Francisco, California. Although the units had received an infusion of new soldiers and equipment and had begun training for war in earnest, almost immediately the soldiers and equipment were being siphoned off to form new units. This was the start of what the unit would experience for the rest of the war.

===== Operations in theater =====
In August 1918, the 40th Division arrived in France. At that moment, the Germans had just completed a series of offensives that started on 21 March and ended on 15 July. These offensives were designed to destroy the American Expeditionary Force before it could be fully constituted, and they almost succeeded. Upon the arrival of the 40th Division in France, it was decided that the division would be used as a depot and it was redesignated as the 6th Depot Division, supplying fresh troops to the more experienced combat divisions. By the end of the war, the 40th Division provided more than 27,000 replacements to the 26th, 28th, 32d, 77th, 80th, 81st, 82d, and 89th Divisions. Of those soldiers provided from the 40th Infantry Division, 2,587 members were killed in action and 11,596 were wounded. An additional 103 were to die of their wounds at the Post Hospital in Camp Kearny near San Diego, California.

===== Demobilization and restructuring =====
On 20 April 1919, the 40th Division was demobilized at Camp Kearny near San Diego, California, where they had been formed just two years before. On 1 May 1919, those elements of the 2d Infantry Regiment (California) that were used to create the 159th Infantry Regiment were released from federal service at the Presidio of San Francisco near San Francisco, California. On 7 May 1919, those elements of the 2d Infantry Regiment (California) that were used to create the 160th Infantry Regiment were returned to the 2d Infantry Regiment (California) at Camp Kearny near San Diego, California.

==== Decorations ====
The 2d Infantry Regiment (California) received a campaign streamer (without inscription) for service. The 184th Infantry Regiment proudly displays this streamer as a descendant of the 2d Infantry Regiment (California).

=== 1924–present 184th Infantry ===
On 20 October 1924, the 184th Infantry Regiment was formed as a result of the reconstitution and reorganization of the northern and central California elements of the 2nd Infantry Regiment (California). The San Francisco area elements of the 2nd Infantry Regiment (California) were not included. The headquarters of the 184th Infantry Regiment (California) was in Sacramento and the unit was once again a part of the 40th Division of the California National Guard.

==== 1927 Folsom State Prison riots ====
In November 1927, elements of the 184th Infantry Regiment were mobilized to assist with quelling a riot at Folsom State Prison.

From 18 February 1929 through 1 April 1929, the 185th Infantry Regiment was formed as a result of the withdrawal, expansion, reorganization, and redesignation of the central California elements of the 184th Infantry Regiment.

==== 1934 West coast waterfront strike ====
On 9 May 1934, longshoremen and sailors throughout the West Coast of the United States began a strike that would last for 83 days. On 5 July, elements of the 184th Infantry Regiment, along with other members of the California National Guard, were mobilized to restore order in San Francisco's waterfront when hostilities during the strike escalated.

==== World War II ====
===== Mobilization, restructuring, and training =====
On 3 March 1941, the entire 184th Infantry Regiment was mobilized as part of a general mobilization of the United States Army National Guard, and mustered at Camp San Luis Obispo. Most of the soldiers believed that they would be mobilized for a year and then sent home, which changed on 7 December 1941 when the Japanese attacked Pearl Harbor. Within 48 hours of the attack on Pearl Harbor, the regiment moved to the San Diego area and took up defensive positions for the expected attack or invasion of the West Coast of the United States. The regiment was scattered throughout a number of areas including Del Mar, La Mesa, and Lindbergh Field, while Company A was sent to San Clemente Island. If the Japanese attack had occurred, this lone company of Sacramentans would have been decimated since there was no avenue of retreat or reinforcement. The regiment remained in the greater San Diego area until April, when (similar to the mobilization for World War I) they were stationed at Fort Lewis near Seattle, Washington and later to the Presidio of San Francisco near San Francisco, California.

In June 1942, while at the Presidio, the regiment was relieved from the 40th Infantry Division and attached directly to the Western Defense Command. In November 1942, while still officially under the control of the Western Defense Command, the regiment was attached to the 7th Infantry Division at Fort Ord and later Amphibious Training Force Nine. It was during this period that the regiment was reinforced and its title modified to "184th Regimental Combat Team".

===== Operations in theater =====
====== Aleutian Islands Campaign ======
In July 1943, the regiment left San Francisco bound for the Japanese-held Kiska in the Aleutian Islands, Alaska during the Aleutian Islands Campaign. The 184th arrived on Adak Island for training, and was assigned to the 7th Infantry Division as its third regiment. On 15 August 1943, the regiment participated in Operation Cottage, the retaking of the last Japanese-held island in the Aleutians. The regiment, augmented by the 1st Battalion, 87th Mountain Infantry Regiment, and with the 13th Canadian Infantry Brigade Group on its right, made its first of many assault landings at Long Beach on Kiska Island. When the regiment landed, its commander, Colonel Curtis D. O'Sullivan, ordered the regiment's band to play. They responded with "California, Here I Come," and "The Maple Leaf Forever." After an unopposed landing, the regiment found that the Japanese garrison had been evacuated by a large cruiser and destroyer force on 28 July. The enemy had left in such a hurry that they left mess tables still set with meals, and blankets soaked in fuel oil, but not lit. Nevertheless, the regiment did have the honor of being the only National Guard regiment to regain lost American soil from a foreign enemy in World War II, the first since the War of 1812. On 23 August 1943, the regiment was officially assigned to the 7th Infantry Division. In September 1943, when the island was declared secure, the regiment moved to Schofield Barracks, Hawaii. This was a welcome change for the men who just spent over three months on the Alaskan islands, but it did not last long.

====== Battle of Kwajalein ======
On 20 January 1944, the regiment left Hawaii bound for the Marshall Islands. Kwajalien Atoll had been Japanese territory for decades. As such, they had many opportunities to build a complex system of fortifications. On 1 February 1944, the regiment, along with the 32d Infantry Regiment assaulted the heavily defended atoll. Two days later, Companies A, B and C were given the assignment to clear the highly fortified blockhouse sector. Approximately five days later, when the Battle of Kwajalein was over, more than 8,000 Japanese soldiers of the 61st Naval Guard Force were killed in action. General George C. Marshall, Chairman of the Joint Chiefs of Staff, later said that the operations on Kwajalien were the most efficient of the war. Once again, the regiment achieved another first, as they were the first National Guard unit to seize and hold territory that Japan held prior to the start of the war.

With the island secure, the regiment re-embarked on to their transports and returned to Hawaii for rehabilitation and more training. On 15 September 1944, they departed Hawaii, bound for Eniwetok Island. Initially, this was to be a staging area for the invasion of Yap Island. When they arrived, however, they found that the operation had been canceled in favor of a larger landing, the liberation of the Philippines.

====== Battle of Leyte ======
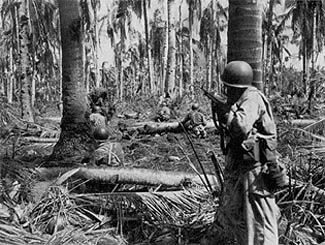
Soldiers from the 184th Infantry advance on an enemy position at Dagami, Leyte

On the morning of 20 October 1944, the regiment landed on the beaches near Dulag on the east coast of the island of Leyte. With the beachhead secured, they moved inland. The island provided the Japanese with an ideal defensive terrain, as Leyte is a large island, covered with mountains, rain forests, and swamps. The Japanese were long accustomed to fighting in the jungle, and had over three years of occupation to learn the terrain and plan defenses. Additionally, it was easy for the Japanese to reinforce their garrison on Leyte from Luzon in the north and Mindanao in the south. The Japanese 34th Army, consisting of four divisions, including the infamous 16th Division that was credited for the "Rape of Nanking" and the "Bataan Death March," was the primary opponent on Leyte. The 184th Infantry Regiment pushed through the Dulag Valley and experienced high casualties. When the Japanese counterattacked the 32d Infantry Regiment, which had spread out along the Palanas River, the 184th was sent to reinforce them. Several attacks were repulsed and the enemy was driven into the bamboo thickets. This action later became known as The Battle of Shoestring Ridge.

On 28 November 1944, the 11th Airborne Division relieved the division, less the 17th Infantry Regiment. The division then moved to Baybay, and the 184th started a drive from Damulaan towards the port of Ormac. They then seized the town Albuere and had joined up with soldiers of the 77th Infantry Division, which had landed near Ormac. The remainder of the 7th then moved to Ormac to regroup. From there, they spent several weeks landing on and securing several of the small islands that surround Leyte. On 10 February 1945, they were relieved by the Americal Division and started to prepare for the Ryukyus Campaign. When the division left, they were credited with inflicting more than 54,000 enemy deaths.

====== Battle of Okinawa ======
On 1 April 1945, the division landed on Okinawa. Initially, the 7th and 96th Infantry Divisions were to clear the southern end of the island. Fortunately for these thinly spread forces, an expected counterattack did not occur. If it had, there was a possibility that the Japanese could have driven the invasion force into the sea. On 5 April, the 184th Infantry Regiment encountered typically fierce Japanese opposition at a rocky pinnacle located about 1,000 yards southwest of Arakachi (later dubbed "The Pinnacle"). A few days after the landing, the 184th came into contact with elements of the Japanese 32d Army on the heavily fortified Kakazu Ridge. On 9 April, with the assistance of massed artillery fire, Tomb Hill was captured. By now, companies were losing 30 to 50 men per day. Rifle companies of 40 or 50 men became the rule. On 1 May, despite the presence of infiltrators, the 184th attacked and briefly held Gala Ridge before losing it to a counterattack. Both sides traded blow for blow until the Japanese fell back to their final defensive positions along the Naha-Shuri-Yanabarau Road. In keeping with their motto, "Let's Go," the 184th, using a rainstorm to cover their movements, outflanked the Japanese positions and effectively cut off their forces on the Chenin Peninsula. All that was left to do was mop up the scattered pockets of resistance on the peninsula. When the campaign ended, the Japanese 32d Army had lost tens of thousand of its soldiers. The 184th had lost hundreds.

====== Surrender of Japan – Occupation of Korea ======
The 7th Infantry Division began planning for an invasion that was to make Okinawa look easy – the invasion of the Japanese Home Islands. The dropping of the atomic bombs on Hiroshima and Nagasaki ended the need for the landings. If they had taken place, some predicted that over a million deaths would have occurred on both sides. Instead, the 7th was rushed to Korea to disarm the Japanese garrison there and to provide an occupation force. When the regiment arrived in Seoul, they had the honor of accepting the surrender of all Japanese forces in that region. While there, the regiment would lose many of its members to rotation, although there were few of the original members of regiment left by now. Those who didn't have enough points to be rotated home were used to help reform the 31st Infantry Regiment that had been destroyed on Bataan. It is ironic that the 184th, who helped destroy the Japanese 16th Division, would be rebuilding the regiment destroyed by the 16th. When the 31st Infantry Regiment was fully reconstituted, it replaced the 184th in the 7th Infantry Division's Order of Battle. On 20 January 1946, the 184th Infantry Regiment was inactivated in Korea.

===== Demobilization =====
On 5 August 1946, the 184th Infantry Regiment was relieved from assignment to the 7th Infantry Division and was assigned to the 49th Infantry Division of the California National Guard.

===== Decorations =====
The 184th Infantry Regiment received four Asiatic Pacific Theater streamers with the following inscriptions: ALEUTIAN ISLANDS 1942–1943, EASTERN MANDATES 1944 (with arrowhead), LEYTE 1944–1945 (with arrowhead) and RYUKYUS 1945. The regiment also received a Philippine Presidential Unit Citation with an accompanying streamer embroidered 17 OCTOBER 1944 TO 4 JULY 1945 and a Republic of Korea Presidential Unit Citation with an accompanying streamer embroidered KOREA 1945–1946.

==== Post–World War II era ====
On 10 October 1946, the 184th Infantry Regiment was reorganized and federally recognized, with headquarters in Sacramento, as part of the 49th Infantry Division of the California National Guard.

On 1 May 1959, the 184th Infantry Regiment was reorganized as the 184th Infantry, a parent regiment under the Combat Arms Regimental System, to consist of the 1st and 2d Battle Groups, elements of the 49th Infantry Division of the California National Guard. The lineage of Company A, 184th Infantry Regiment was used to form HHC, 1st Battle Group, 184th Infantry, while the lineage of Company B, 184th Infantry Regiment was used to form HHC, 2d Battle Group, 184th Infantry. The term "regiment" was no longer used because regiments were no longer in the force structure, having been replaced by battle groups, and regimental numbers were only used for purposes of lineage and honors.

On 1 March 1963, the 184th Infantry was reorganized to consist of the 1st and 2d Battalions, elements of the 49th Infantry Division of the California National Guard.

===== Watts riots =====
In August 1965, the 1st and 2d Battalions of the 184th Infantry were mobilized in response to the Watts riots. The battalions were mobilized as part of the 49th Infantry Division, which arrived after much of the rioting had ended.

On 4 December 1965, the 184th Infantry was reorganized to consist of the 1st Battalion, an element of the 49th Infantry Division of the California National Guard.

On 29 January 1968, the 184th Infantry was reorganized to consist of the 1st Battalion, an element of the 49th Infantry Brigade of the California National Guard.

On 1 November 1976, the 184th Infantry was reorganized to consist of the 1st battalion, an element of the 40th Armored Division of the California National Guard.

===== Los Angeles riots =====
In April 1992, elements of the first battalion were mobilized under state and federal control in response to the Los Angeles riots.

==== 21st century ====
===== Operation Desert Spring =====
In 2001, Companies A and B of the 1st Battalion (augmented with soldiers from other battalion elements) were mobilized under federal control for deployment to Kuwait. The soldiers conducted readiness processing and training at Camp Roberts.

In July 2001, Company A arrived in Kuwait. In January 2002, Company A was replaced by Company B and returned to California in July 2002. Soldiers from the 1st Battalion provided security at Camp Doha and at several Patriot missile battery sites along the border with Iraq. Although the deployment was scheduled as a routine mission, the 11 September 2001 attacks occurred while Company A was in Kuwait, thus the mission changed to become part of the Global War on Terrorism.

Company A returned to California as scheduled in January 2002. Company B returned to California as scheduled in July 2002. Both units returned from theater to Camp Roberts near Paso Robles, California for demobilization activities.

While the 1st Battalion did not receive campaign participation credit, those soldiers who served with Companies A and B during this mobilization received either the Armed Forces Expeditionary Medal or the Global War on Terrorism Expeditionary Medal.

===== 2004–06 Iraq =====
In August 2004, the entire 1st Battalion was mobilized for a deployment in support of Operation Iraqi Freedom 05–06. The battalion was initially mobilized to Camp Roberts near Paso Robles, California for initial readiness processing. On 16 August 2004, the battalion was transferred to Fort Bliss near El Paso, Texas for four months of pre-deployment training. In early January 2005, the battalion moved to Fort Polk in Louisiana for a readiness evaluation prior to movement into theater.

In late January 2005, the battalion arrived in Kuwait to acclimate and conduct final training and organization prior to moving into Iraq. In late February 2005, the battalion arrived in Baghdad, Iraq and was attached to the 4th Brigade Combat Team, 3d Infantry Division. On 23 March, the battalion assumed control of an area of operations in central and southern Baghdad from the 1st Battalion, 153d Infantry Regiment, and conducted full spectrum combat operations out of FOB Falcon and the Green Zone. The battalion's area of operations included the Karrada and Dora neighborhoods of southern Baghdad. Several active duty units were attached to the 1st Battalion to form "Task Force Nightstalker" under the command of the battalion HQ, including one company of M1A1 Abrams tanks from the 4th Battalion, 64th Armor Regiment. The battalion's Charlie company was temporarily assigned to provide security at the Convention Center in the Green Zone during the 16 March first meeting of the transitional National Assembly that was elected on 30 January, assuming control of the Convention Center from a company of the 2d Battalion, 325th Infantry Regiment and relinquishing control less than two months later to the 13th "Shavnabada" Infantry Battalion from the Republic of Georgia. The battalion provided security during the constitutional referendum held on 15 October and the election of the Council of Representatives on 15 December. In January, the battalion was relieved by a company of the 2d Battalion, 506th Infantry Regiment as part of planned operations to increase the role of Iraqi Army and Police forces in the area as a substitute for United States forces. A list of twelve of the soldiers assigned to the battalion who were killed in action during this mobilization, not including five soldiers from units who were attached to Task Force Nightstalker, is available here. Not since the Korean War had a unit from California had as many combat casualties.

The battalion returned to Fort Bliss near El Paso, Texas in January for demobilization processing, and returned to California in January.

The battalion received two Iraq Campaign streamers with the following inscriptions: IRAQI GOVERNANCE 2004–2005 and NATIONAL RESOLUTION 2005–2007. The battalion also received a Valorous Unit Award and streamer with the inscription BAGHDAD 2005.

===== 2005 Hurricane Katrina Task Force California =====
On 1 September 2005, Soldiers assigned to the first battalion's rear detachment (not forward deployed to Iraq) were mobilized under federal control as part Task Force California in response to Hurricane Katrina.

The Soldiers were sent to New Orleans, Louisiana as part of Task Force California to help restore order to the city and surrounding area and provide humanitarian assistance. The Soldiers assisted the local residents in the aftermath of one of the most severe natural disasters to occur in the United States. The Soldiers who mobilized in support of relief operations in the aftermath of Hurricane Katrina were released from active duty on 11 November 2005.

===== 2006 Operation Aero Shield =====
In August 2006, elements of the 1st Battalion were mobilized under state control in response to a planned terrorist attack that was disrupted in the planning stages in the United Kingdom.

===== 2007 California wildfires =====
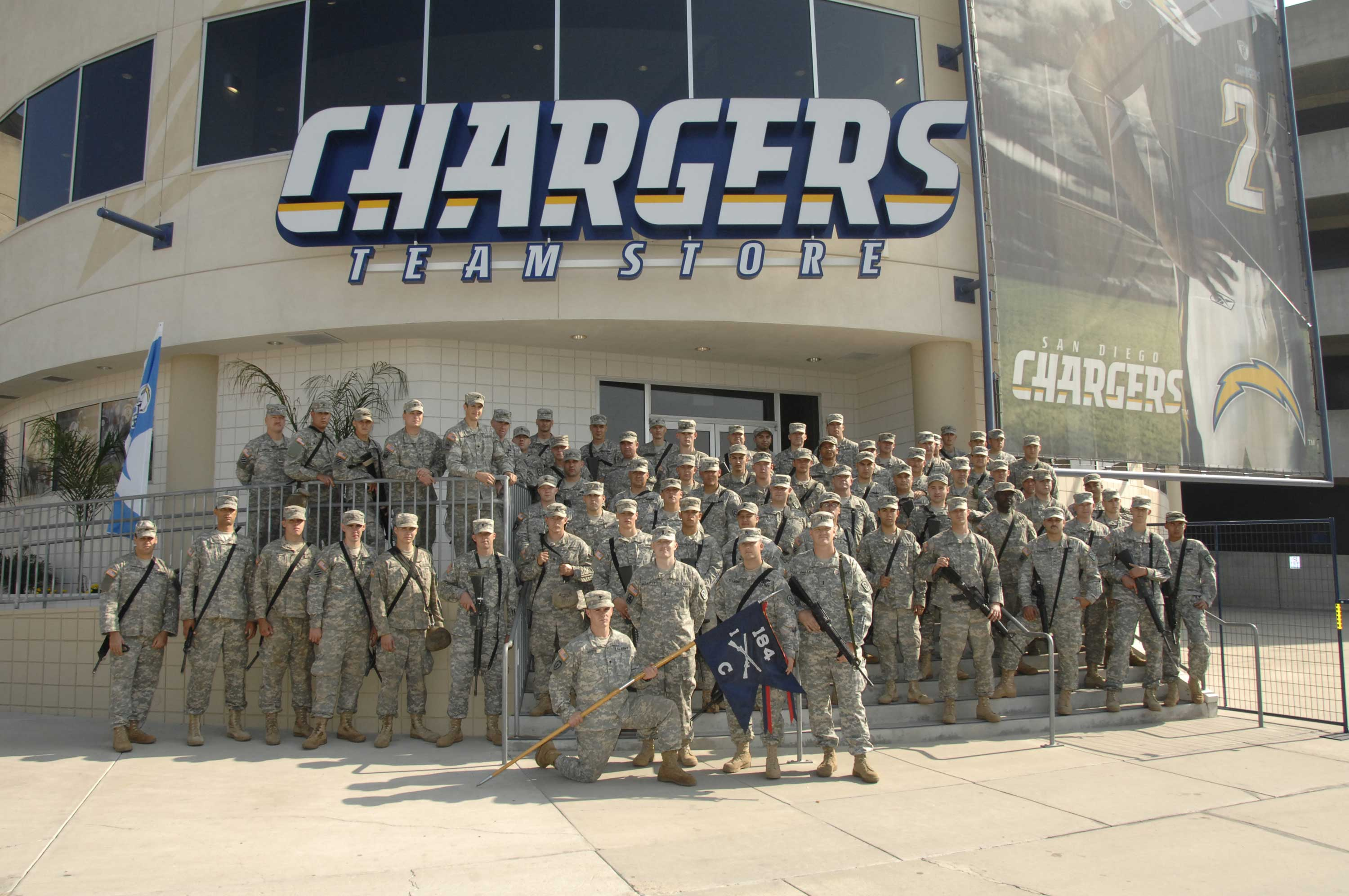
Soldiers from Company C, 1–184th Infantry pose for a photo at Qualcomm Stadium on 29 October 2007.

On 22 October 2007, elements of the 1st Battalion were mobilized under state control in response to widespread wildfires near San Diego. Elements of the battalion, although they mustered in northern California, were nonetheless some of the first California National Guard elements to occupy Montgomery Airfield in San Diego. In addition to other elements of the California National Guard, the battalion used Montgomery Airfield as their primary base of operations to conduct local civil support missions throughout San Diego County. The battalion augmented local security at several sites, including Qualcomm Stadium, that were established to support local residents who were forced to evacuate their homes. In addition, elements of the battalion augmented local authorities throughout the area, conducting patrols of evacuated neighborhoods and manning checkpoints.

As a link to their progenitors of the 2d Infantry Regiment (California) in World War I, Montgomery Airfield is located two miles south of MCAS Miramar, which was previously named Camp Kearny. Camp Kearny was the site where many of the soldiers in the 2d Infantry Regiment (California) were mobilized and demobilized for service during World War I.

===== 2008 California wildfires =====
In July 2008, elements of the 1st Battalion were mobilized under state control in response to widespread wildfires throughout California. The battalion completed hand crew training for wildland fire fighting in conjunction with the United States Forest Service at McClellan Airfield, but the battalion was never selected to perform actual wildland fire fighting.

===== 2008–09 Iraq =====
In August 2008, the 1st Battalion's Companies A and B (augmented with soldiers from other battalion elements) were mobilized for a deployment in support of Operation Iraqi Freedom 08–09. The companies were released from the 184th Infantry Regiment and reassigned to the 1st Battalion, 185th Armor Regiment.

The two companies performed combat logistical patrols throughout northern Iraq. In August 2009, the two companies returned to California.

While the 1st Battalion did not receive campaign participation credit, those soldiers who served with Companies A and B during this deployment earned Iraq Campaign credit for IRAQI SURGE and IRAQI SOVEREIGNTY. The two companies also were awarded the Meritorious Unit Commendation as part of the 230th Combat Support Sustainment Battalion, Tennessee Army National Guard.

===== 2008–09 Kosovo =====
In December 2008, the 1st Battalion's HQ and Company D were mobilized for a deployment in support of Operation Joint Guardian. In addition to these companies, "Task Force Nightstalker" consisted of Company A from the 1st Battalion, 185th Armor Regiment and Company E from the Special Troops Battalion, 79th Infantry Brigade Combat Team. Task Force Nightstalker was once again assigned to the 40th Infantry Division. The task force conducted initial readiness processing and training at Camp Roberts in November 2008. In December 2008, the task force moved to Camp Atterbury in Indiana for additional training. In January 2009, the task force moved to JMRC Hohenfels for final validation training prior to moving into the Kosovo theater.

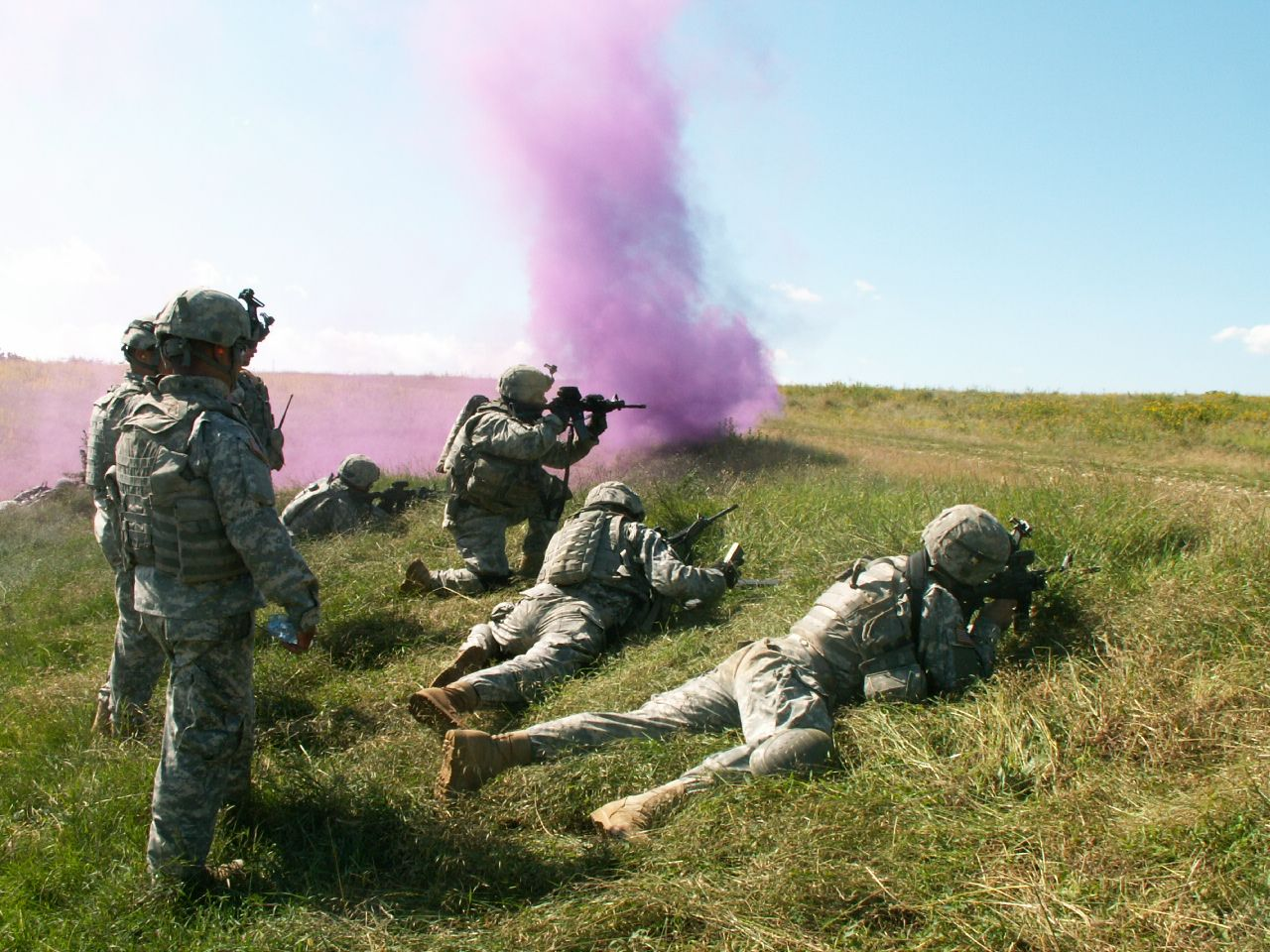
Soldiers from the 184th Infantry conduct live fire training in Kosovo on 20 July 2009.

The task force operated in Kosovo as part of Multinational Task Force East (KFOR 11). The task force operated as one of two maneuver task forces tasked with providing a safe and secure environment and ensuring freedom of movement in accordance with United Nations Resolution 1244. On 7 March, the task force assumed control of an area of operations in the Gnjilane, Kamenica, and Novo Brdo areas of eastern Kosovo from the 1st Battalion, 129th Field Artillery Regiment. The majority of the stability and support operations were conducted by the task force out of Camp Bondsteel. In addition to normal operations, task force Soldiers also maintained their proficiency with live fire exercises.

In October 2009, Task Force Nightstalker began familiarization training with their relief force, the 231st Maneuver Task Force, a unit consisting of soldiers from both the 231st Brigade Support Battalion (ND ARNG) and the 137th Infantry Regiment (KS ARNG). In late October, Task Force Nightstalker officially handed over responsibility for their area of operations to the 231st Maneuver Task Force.

In November 2009, the task force departed Kosovo to conduct demobilization operations at Fort Lewis near Seattle, Washington and returned to California a few weeks later.

The battalion received one Kosovo Campaign streamer with the following inscription: KOSOVO DEFENSE CAMPAIGN. Individual Soldiers may also have received the Kosovo Campaign Medal and the NATO Non-Article 5 Medal.

===== 2017–18 Jordan =====
For a year, elements of the Regiment, deployed to Jordan for Operation Spartan Shield. In 2018, they were relieved by elements of the 18th Cavalry.

===== 2017-18 Qatar, Bahrain, Kosovo, and Hawaii =====
For a year, elements of the Regiment, deployed to Qatar to provide security for the Al Udeid Air Base. Other elements of the Regiment went to Bahrain, Kosovo as well as the aforementioned deployment to Jordan. After the deployments some elements went to Hawaii to assist in training.

===== 2020-2021 Civil Unrest and Inauguration Support =====
In June of 2020, the entire BN was activated in support of local law enforcement response to civil unrest in downtown Sacramento. In Jan 2021, the BN was activated again in Sacramento in support of civil agencies during the presidential inauguration.

===== 2025 Federal Protection Mission =====
In June 2025, By direction of the Secretary of Defense and in coordination with U.S. Northern Command, 2,000 additional California Army National Guard soldiers, including 1-184th soldiers were activated in a Title 10 status to support the protection of federal functions, personnel, and property in the greater Los Angeles area.

== Subordinate units ==
Only the 1st Battalion remains an active unit. The 2d Battalion was inactivated on 29 January 1968 during a reorganization of California Army National Guard forces. The 3d Battalion (pre-Pentomic battle group era) was inactivated when the regiment was reorganized on 1 May 1949.

=== First Battalion ===
The 1st Battalion currently serves as one of two infantry battalions of the 79th Infantry Brigade Combat Team. Companies A, B, and C are line infantry units, while Company D provides anti-armor support for the battalion. These are the locations for companies of the 1st Battalion:

- Headquarters and Headquarters Company – Modesto, California.
- Company A – Visalia, California.
- Company B – Camp Parks RFTA, Dublin, California.
- Company C – Sacramento, California.
- Company D – Oakdale, California.
- Company H, Brigade Support Battalion, 79th Infantry Brigade Combat Team is located in Fresno, California. It provides transportation and other support as the 1st Battalion's Forward Support Company (FSC).
