= The Pinnacle (Battle of Okinawa) =

- Part of Battle of Okinawa, World War II, the Pacific War
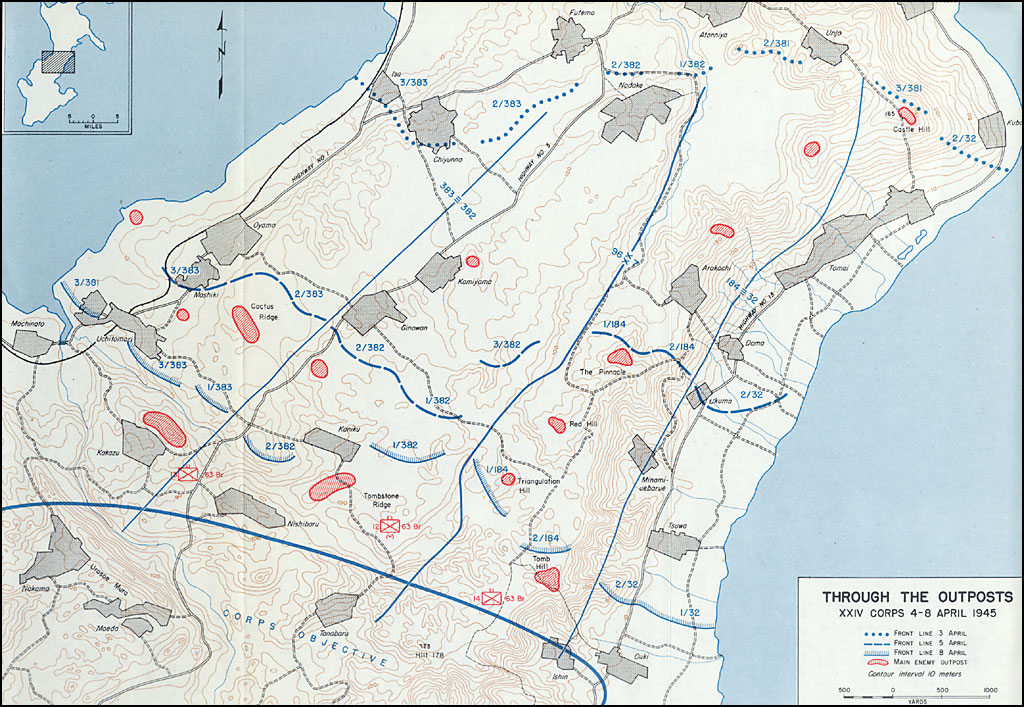
- Advance of American XXIV Corps showing approximate Japanese positions north of Shuri, April 1945
Date	April 5–6, 1945
Location	Okinawa, Japan
Result	Allied victory

Belligerents
United States	Empire of Japan

Commanders and leaders
Lt. Col. Daniel G. Maybury	1st Lt. Seiji Tanigawa

Strength
1st Battalion, 184th Infantry Regiment, 7th Infantry Division	1st Company, 24th Independent Infantry Battalion, 62nd Division

The Pinnacle was the name given to a 30-foot-tall (9.1 m) spire, atop a 450-foot-tall (140 m) ridge of coral approximately 1,000 yards (910 m) southwest of Arakachi, Okinawa. Heavily fortified by the 62nd Division, this outpost to Japan's main defenses at Shuri held up the U.S. 7th Infantry Division on 5–6 April 1945 with accurate and well-concealed machine gun, mortar and artillery fire.

== The Pinnacle as a defensive position ==
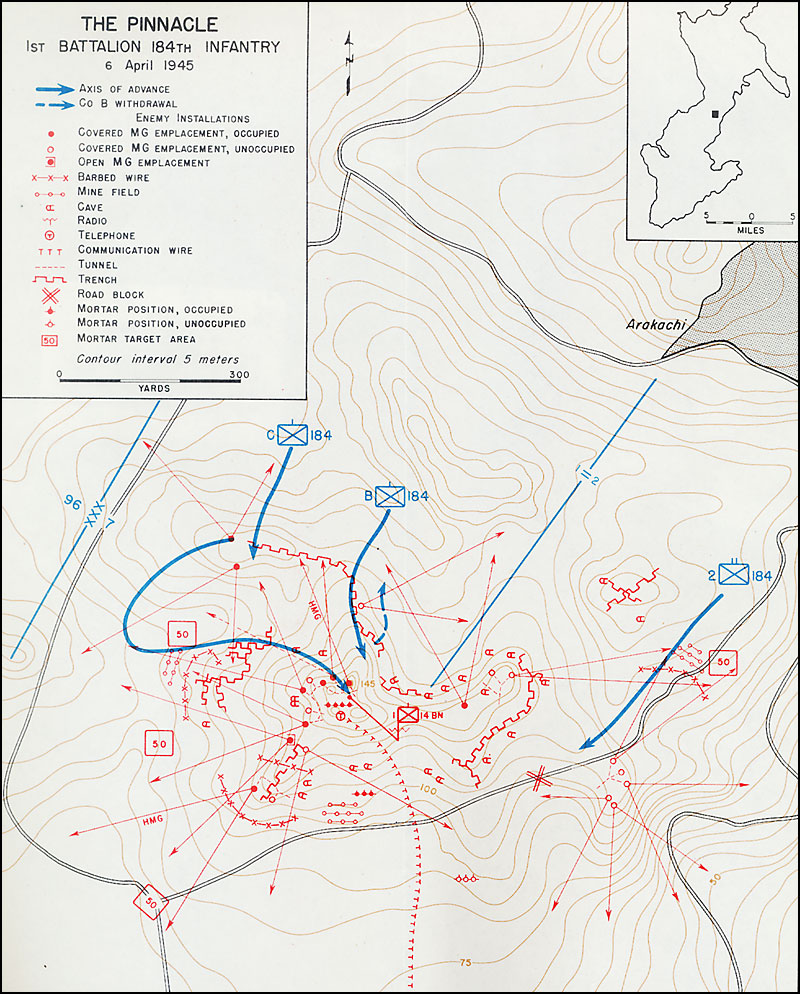
The Pinnacle: Japanese positions & American assault, 5 April 1945

Lieutenant Tanigawa had built his defenses around eight light and two heavy machine guns sited at the base of the hill. In trenches and pits riflemen well-supplied with grenades covered the dead spaces in front of the machine guns. The defenses were connected by the usual tunnels and trenches, affording underground mobility. On the top of the ridge were four 50 mm mortars, and on the reverse slope to the south were three more. Artillery check points had been established for 62nd Division field pieces to the south. Barbed wire and mine fields protected the major approaches. Lieutenant Tanigawa could hardly have hoped to stop the Americans, but undoubtedly he expected to make the price of victory high.

== 6 April 1945 ==
The U.S. Army conducted a 10-minute artillery bombardment of The Pinnacle on the morning of 6 April. B Company, 184th Infantry, 7th Division was ordered to make a frontal assault. They were to be supported to their right (west) by C Company.

Two platoons were able to make it close to the top of the target ridge, but alerted the Japanese defenders to their presence once the Americans began dropping grenades into the caves and underground positions they had encountered. The Japanese were able to dislodge both platoons with grenades, satchel charges and pre-sighted mortar fire. American forces suffered heavy casualties.

One hour later, the Americans once again attempted a direct infantry assault against The Pinnacle; however, this time they provided supporting 105 mm artillery fire, light tank support, anti-tank guns, heavy machine guns, bazookas, 4.2 inch chemical mortars, 60 and 80 mm mortars. Despite this combined arms assault, Japanese defenders were once again able to drive the Americans off. Japanese soldiers had simply hidden in their caves during the pre-assault bombardment, then rushed back to their prepared positions to meet subsequent assaulting troops.

At this point, Lt. Col. Daniel Maybury, Commander, 1st Battalion, 184th Infantry, made a change in tactics. He directed C Company up a draw just beyond the ridge that had been used by B Company. While B Company quickly worked their way up the ridge in an attempt to catch Japanese defenders out of their positions, C Company worked its way up the western approaches to The Pinnacle, in what turned out to be a difficult but partially covered route.

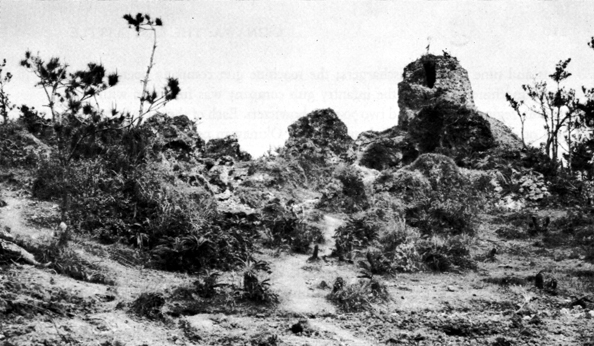
The Pinnacle. Its western approaches, over which Company C moved to capture it, are shown above.

While Lieutenant Tanigawa was able to direct the repulse of B Company from the observation points afforded to him by the structure of The Pinnacle, he was completely unaware of C Company advancing on his western flank. Following in the path of supporting fire, C Company quickly made their way to the top of the ridge without loss. The Americans, having achieved the element of surprise in their flanking maneuver, then proceeded to leisurely and methodically destroy the remaining Japanese with white phosphorus grenades and flamethrowers. Only 20 of the 110 defenders escaped to the south. With the Pinnacle reduced, the entire 7th Division line could move forward.

== Conclusion ==
The Pinnacle had been a tough position to crack, yet it was only an outpost. The Pinnacle was undermanned, and no reinforcements were provided. During the action Lieutenant Tanigawa pleaded with his superiors for artillery support, but he was provided with neither the artillery nor an explanation of the refusal. By 6–7 April the XXIV Corps had unmasked the Shuri fortified zone, composed of many positions as fanatically defended as Pinnacle outpost and also heavily supported by artillery and fed by an almost endless stream of reinforcements from local reserve units.
