= James L. Richardson =

United States Army officer

James Lowell Richardson Jr.
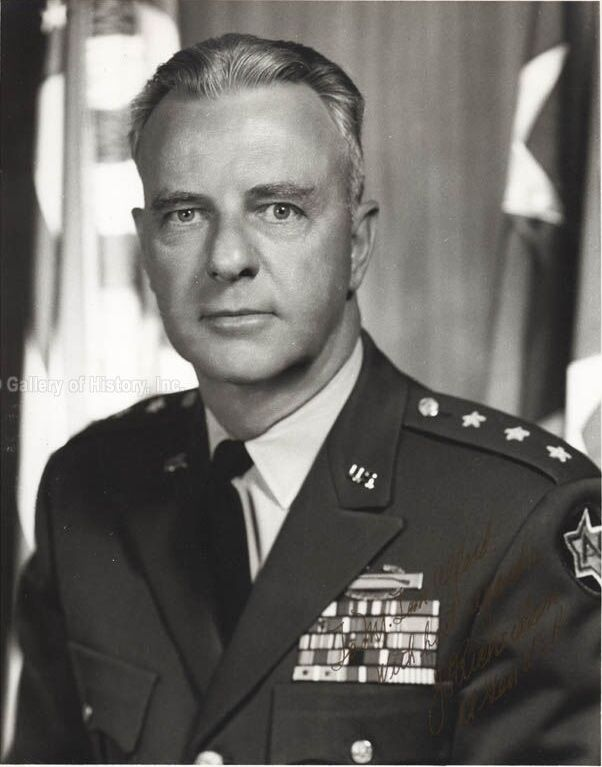
- Official portrait of Richardson, c. 1965
- Born: 12 June 1909; Nebraska City, Nebraska
- Died: 20 January 1987 (aged 77); Presidio of San Francisco, California
- Burial place: San Francisco National Cemetery
- Military career
- Allegiance: United States
- Branch: United States Army
- Service years: 1926–1967
- Rank: Lieutenant General
- Nickname: Walking Jim
- Commands: Sixth United States Army; Joint Task Force 116; 25th Infantry Division; 224th Infantry Regiment
- Conflicts: World War II; Korean War
- Awards: Army Distinguished Service Medal (2); Silver Star; Legion of Merit (2); Bronze Star Medal; Purple Heart

James Lowell "Walking Jim" Richardson Jr. (12 June 1909 – 20 January 1987) was a United States Army lieutenant general during the Cold War.

A graduate of West Point who began his military service in the 1930s, Richardson served in Europe during the final months of World War II. He commanded the 224th Infantry Regiment during the Korean War, then served at The Pentagon, and as an assistant division commander and corps chief of staff with United States Army Europe. Returning to The Pentagon as assistant deputy chief of staff for personnel, Richardson commanded the 25th Infantry Division and served as deputy commander-in-chief and chief of staff of United States Army Pacific. In 1962 to 1963 he commanded a joint task force deployed to Thailand in response to the Laos Crisis, then served as deputy chief of staff for personnel. Richardson ended his career in the late 1960s as commanding general of Sixth United States Army.

== Early life and prewar service ==
Richardson was born on 12 June 1909 in the small town of Nebraska City, Nebraska, the only son out of the three children of James Addison and Bertha (Fass) Richardson. His father was the owner of the local laundry company and later became mayor. Like many of his era, he worked as a paperboy during high school. Richardson graduated from Nebraska City High School and received an appointment to West Point, becoming one of the youngest members of the Class of 1930 there on 1 July 1926. At the academy, he was a member of the lacrosse and wrestling teams. Academics were not his strength: he was turned out twice for failing English and mathematics exams but managed to pass them the second time to avoid being dropped from the academy.

Graduating 216th out of 241 in his class, Richardson was commissioned as a second lieutenant and posted to the 2nd Infantry Regiment at Fort Brady. Transferred to Hawaii in September 1934, he served a year there with the 19th Infantry Regiment at Schofield Barracks and extended his tour there for another two with the military police company at Fort Shafter in December 1935. After completing the Company Officer's Course at the Infantry School between 1938 and June 1939, Richardson remained at Fort Benning as commander of Company A of the 29th Infantry Regiment. During this period, he met his wife, Louise Cochran, whom he married on 17 June 1939. In August 1941, he was sent back to West Point as a tactical officer with the Corps of Cadets, serving as commander of the infantry detachment and provost marshal.

== World War II ==
Richardson remained at West Point during the early months after the United States entered World War II and in April 1942 transferred to Washington to serve as chief of Administrative Services with the Services of Supply. After completing a shortened course at the Command and General Staff College in February 1943, he was sent to the infantry replacement training center at Camp Wolters as an instructor, and thence to the newly activated 70th Infantry Division at Camp Adair in May. At Camp Adair, Richardson became executive officer of the 275th Infantry Regiment of the division, then division G-3 (operations) in June 1944. With the 70th, Richardson moved to Fort Leonard Wood in late July, commanding the 275th between August and November before returning to his G-3 position. Richardson deployed to Europe in December 1944 with the infantry of the division. He was awarded the Bronze Star Medal, and received the Legion of Merit for the coordinating operations of Task Force Herren, drawn from three regiments of the division, in the Rhineland Campaign with "only a skeleton staff" at his disposal.

== Cold War ==
After the end of the war in Europe, Richardson was sent to the Philippines to serve with the 86th Infantry Division, arriving in October after a brief leave with his wife and children. After the surrender of Japan, the division established a training center to revive Philippine Scout units and Richardson served as division guerrilla affairs officer. Before leaving the Philippines, he served as G-3 of the 12th Infantry Division at Camp O'Donnell.

Returning to the United States to study at the Naval War College in mid-1947, Richardson was assigned to the G-3 Section of the Army General Staff as operations and plans officer in The Pentagon in June 1948 following his graduation. He became Regular Army instructor of the 223rd Infantry Regiment of the 40th Infantry Division of the California Army National Guard in mid-1949. When the 40th was Federalized in September 1950 for service in the Korean War, Richardson became commander of its 224th Infantry Regiment. With the division, the regiment trained at Camp Cooke, where he gained the moniker "Walking Jim" from his men for his penchant for night marches.

The division moved to Japan in April 1951 and arrived in Korea in early 1952, taking up a sector on the frontline near Kumsong. Richardson led Company L of the 224th in a raid on Chinese positions on a ridge on 18 February, accompanying one of the two lead platoons of the company. After achieving its objective, the company began withdrawing, with Richardson taking charge after the movement was slowed by the Chinese fire. Slightly wounded, he carried his mortally wounded radioman down the ridge while under Chinese fire, then, covered in blood, he went back up to help other casualties. For his actions, Richardson was awarded the Silver Star. He finished his combat tour in Korea by mid-1952, having also received another Legion of Merit.

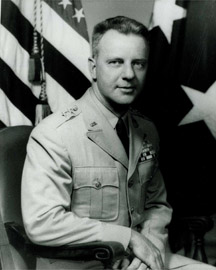
Official portrait of Richardson as a major general

After returning from Korea, Richardson graduated from the National War College and briefly served at The Pentagon. He served as assistant division commander of the 28th Infantry Division in Germany, being promoted to brigadier general, and later became chief of staff of VII Corps at Stuttgart. He went back to The Pentagon in 1958 to serve as deputy chief of staff for personnel, responsible for officer assignments. Richardson returned to Hawaii, where he had served before World War II, to command the 25th Infantry Division as a major general. He later became deputy commander in chief and chief of staff of United States Army Pacific (USARPAC), and in April 1962 was promoted to lieutenant general.

When Joint Task Force 116 was organized by USARPAC to assist the Royal Thai Army following the Laos Crisis, Richardson became its commander due to his experience dealing with guerrillas in the Philippines. The task force patrolled the Laos–Thailand border for six months and was then inactivated. Richardson received a Thai decoration for his service, and returned to The Pentagon as deputy chief of staff for personnel. In this role, he requested the Association of the United States Army to establish command sergeant major's conferences to be held during its annual meetings, and was responsible for the creation of the Army Community Services Program. Richardson ended his career as commanding general of the Sixth United States Army at the Presidio of San Francisco between 1 August 1965 and July 1967. Soon after Richardson assumed command of the army, the Watts riots broke out in Los Angeles and on 15 August 1965 he was selected by officials to command Federal troops if they were sent in to restore order. This was ultimately not needed as the riots were contained by the California National Guard. While commanding Sixth Army, he requested the United Service Organizations to establish a USO Lounge at the San Francisco International Airport, which was used by American servicemen during the Vietnam War, and organized the Fort Point and Army Museum Association. For his service there, Richardson received his third Distinguished Service Medal.

== Later life ==
Following his retirement, Richardson spent a decade working for H&R Block, teaching tax preparation and representing clients before the Internal Revenue Service. He established Careers for Retired Military, an organization that assisted retirees in finding civilian employment. Richardson died at Letterman Army Medical Center on 20 January 1987, survived by his wife, two daughters, and three grandchildren. His remains were interred at the Presidio of San Francisco National Cemetery.

== Awards and decorations ==
Richardson was a recipient of the following decorations:

- Army Distinguished Service Medal with oak leaf cluster
- Silver Star
- Legion of Merit with oak leaf cluster
- Bronze Star Medal with "V" device
- Purple Heart
- Combat Infantryman Badge

== Dates of rank ==
Insignia	Rank	Component	Date
	Cadet	United States Military Academy	1 July 1926
	Second lieutenant	Regular Army	12 June 1930
	First lieutenant	Regular Army	1 August 1935
	Captain	Regular Army	12 June 1940
	Major	Army of the United States	1 February 1942
	Lieutenant colonel	Army of the United States	16 October 1942
	Colonel	Army of the United States	16 April 1945
	Major	Regular Army	12 June 1947
	Lieutenant colonel	Regular Army	15 July 1948
	Colonel	Army of the United States	10 July 1950
	Colonel	Regular Army	1 April 1953
	Brigadier general	Army of the United States	23 January 1954
	Brigadier general	Regular Army	14 May 1957
	Major general	Army of the United States	9 July 1957
	Major general	Regular Army	5 September 1960 (appointed 5 April 1962)
	Lieutenant general	Army of the United States	30 March 1962
