= 251st Air Defense Artillery Regiment =

251st Coast Artillery Regiment
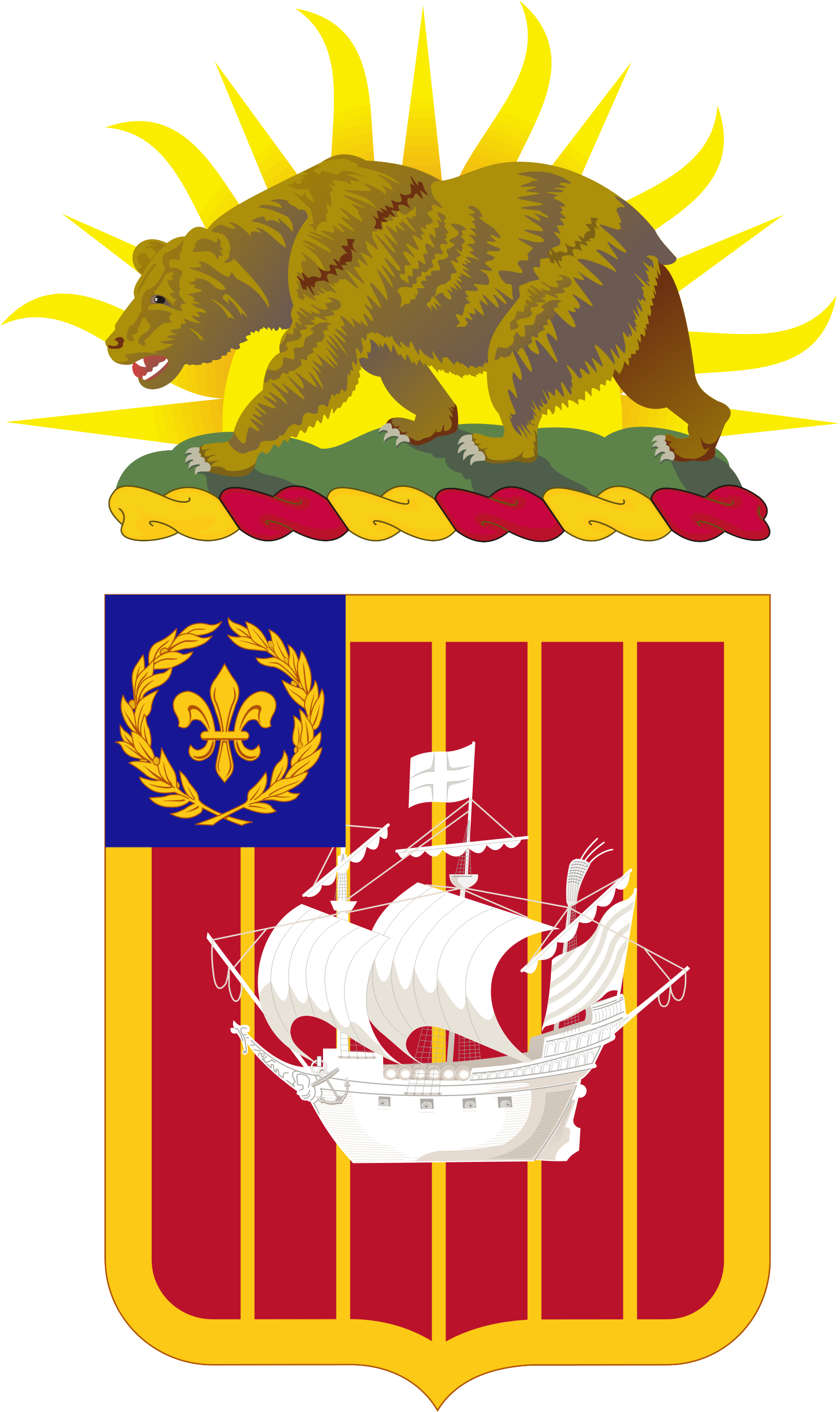
- Coat of arms
- Active: 1924–44; 1959– ?
- Country: United States
- Branch: California Army National Guard
- Type: Air defense
- Garrison/HQ: San Diego
- Motto: "We Aim to Hit"
- Engagements: World War II; Attack on Pearl Harbor

Insignia
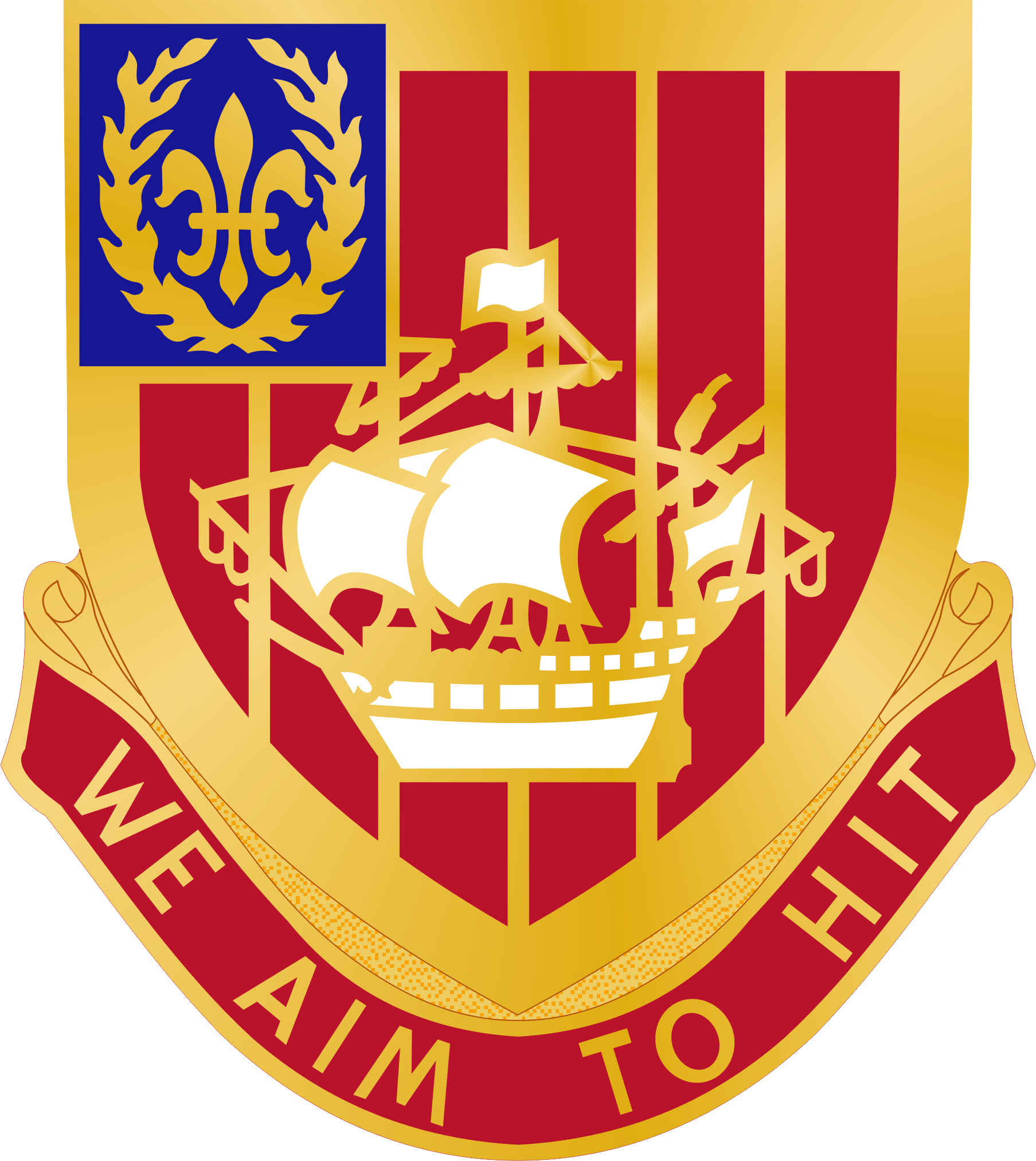
- Distinctive Unit Insignia

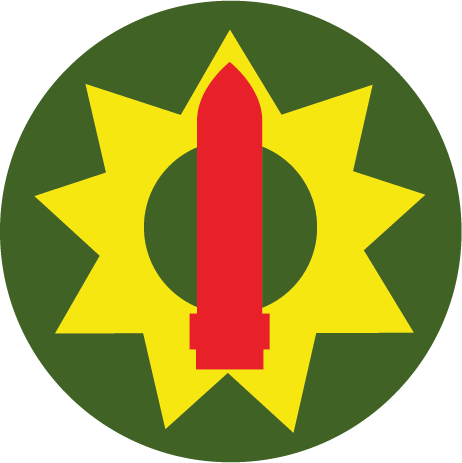
- 9th Artillery District shoulder sleeve insignia

The 251st Coast Artillery was a coast artillery regiment in the California National Guard, constituted in 1924 as a harbor defense regiment for the 9th Artillery District and re-designated in 1930 as an antiaircraft regiment. It served in World War II in that capacity.

== Lineage ==
The regiment was constituted in the National Guard in 1924, allotted to the state of California, and assigned to the Harbor Defenses of San Diego. Batteries were formed by redesignating several batteries of the extant 250th Coast Artillery Regiment on 1 November 1924, and the regimental headquarters was organized and federally recognized on 7 November 1924 at San Diego

- Headquarters (new)
- Headquarters Battery from Battery G, 250th Coast Artillery
- Medical Detachment from Medical Detachment, 250th Coast Artillery
- Battery A from Battery E, 250th Coast Artillery
- Battery B from Battery F, 250th Coast Artillery
- Battery C from Battery H, 250th Coast Artillery
- Battery D from Battery I, 250th Coast Artillery
- Battery E from Battery K, 250th Coast Artillery

As a harbor defense unit, the 251st was the California National Guard's component of the harbor defenses (HD) of Los Angeles and San Diego (Fort MacArthur and Fort Rosecrans were the main forts); parts of the 3rd Coast Artillery Regiment were the Regular Army components of these defenses.

It was redesignated and reorganized as the 251st Coast Artillery (Antiaircraft) on 1 January 1930.The regiment was inducted into federal service 16 September 1940 at home stations, boarded ships for Hawaii on 17 November, and arrived at Fort Shafter, Hawaii on 23 November. The regiment was the first National Guard unit based in the continental United States deployed overseas during World War II. It moved to Camp Malakole on 27 January 1941 and was assigned to the air defense of Pearl Harbor It was engaged during the attack on Pearl Harbor on 7 December 1941; three members of the regiment (Sergeants Henry Blackwell, Jr., and Warren D. Rasmussen, and Corporal Clyde C. Brown) were killed when the two rented Piper Cub aircraft they were taking on a sightseeing trip were shot down by incoming Japanese planes.

The regiment departed Hawaii for Fiji on 22 May 1942 The 3rd Battalion was constituted 27 May 1942 at Nadi, Fiji. The arrival of the regiment in Fiji was reported on 1 June 1942, "more than doubling the anti-aircraft defenses of Fiji." It moved to Guadalcanal 23 November 1943, and to Bougainville 4 December 1943, where it was assigned to XIV Corps Regiment broken up at Bougainville 1 March 1944 as follows-

- HHB as HHB 251st Antiaircraft Artillery Group
- 1st Battalion as 746th Antiaircraft Artillery Gun Battalion
- 2nd battalion as 951st Antiaircraft Artillery Automatic Weapons Battalion
- 3rd Battalion as 140th Antiaircraft Artillery Battalion (Gaines and Stanton list 3rd Battalion as disbanded 1 March 1944, Stanton lists 140th AAA Gun Battalion as existing stateside 10 July 1943 to 25 January 1945)

The 746th Antiaircraft Artillery Gun Battalion moved to the Philippines on 9 January 1945, returned to San Francisco Port of Embarkation 13 January 1946, inactivated 15 January 1946 at Camp Stoneman, California.

The 951st Antiaircraft Artillery Automatic Weapons Battalion moved to the Philippines on 9 January 1945, returned to San Francisco for inactivation 26 December 1945.

The 251st Antiaircraft Artillery Group departed Bougainville on 11 December 1944, stopped at Lae, New Guinea and Manus, Admiralty Islands, arriving at Lingayen Gulf, Philippines on 9 January 1945. Moved to Manila 8 March 1945; returned to San Francisco 26 December 1945 and inactivated at Camp Stoneman 29 December 1945.

Later the regiment became an air defense artillery regiment, and was equipped with the Nike-Hercules missile. Elements which were to become part of the 251st Air Defense Artillery were under control of the Regular Army's 47th Artillery Brigade (Air Defense), part of Army Air Defense Command. The brigade's command post was at the Fort MacArthur Direction Center in San Pedro, Los Angeles. In May 1959, the 720th ADA Battalion was redesigned as the 4th Missile Battalion (Nike-Hercules) 251st Artillery, California Army National Guard.

The headquarters of the 114th Artillery Brigade carried on the air defence lineage

- Converted and redesignated 1 March 1963 as Headquarters and Headquarters Company, 3d Brigade, 40th Armored Division
- Reorganized and redesignated 29 January 1968 as Headquarters and Headquarters Company, 111th Armor Group; concurrently relieved from assignment to the 40th Armored Division
- Reorganized and redesignated 1 November 1971 as the 111th Area Headquarters
- Reorganized and redesignated 1 April 1972 as Headquarters and Headquarters Detachment, 111th Area Headquarters
- Reorganized and redesignated 13 January 1974 as Headquarters and Headquarters Company, 2d Brigade, 40th Infantry Division; location concurrently changed to Los Alamitos. Location changed 1 January 1981 to San Diego

The lineage of the regiments headquarters company continues on in the form of the headquarters company of the 79th Infantry Brigade Combat Team.

== Distinctive unit insignia ==
- Description

A Gold color metal and enamel device 1 1/8 inches (2.9 cm) in height overall consisting of a shield blazoned: Or, six pallets couped Gules, a ship of Cabrillo’s time Argent; on a canton Azure a fleur-de-lis encircled by a garland of laurel of the first. Attached below and to the sides of the shield a Red scroll inscribed “WE AIM TO HIT” in Gold letters.

- Symbolism

The shield is red for Artillery. The six pallets couped produce a diminished bordure effect on the shield and represent the six batteries comprising the Regiment at the time of its organization. The ship is a representation of the ship of Don Juan Rodrigues Cabrillo, a Portuguese, who discovered San Diego Harbor. The charges on the canton, the fleur-de-lis encircled by a garland of laurel, are taken from the coat of arms of the 250th Coast Artillery, as Batter B of the 251st Coast Artillery, California National Guard, is a descendant of Batter F of the 250th Coast Artillery, California National Guard which served during World War I as B Battery of the 65th Coast Artillery (US).

- Background

The distinctive unit insignia was originally approved for the 251st Coast Artillery (Harbor Defense) on 9 January 1928. It was amended to add the motto on 16 June 1928. It was redesignated for the 746th Antiaircraft Artillery Gun Battalion on 7 January 1952. The insignia was redesignated for the 251st Artillery Regiment on 16 February 1961. It was redesignated for the 251st Air Defense Artillery Regiment on 10 July 1972.

== Awards ==
In 1936, the regiment was awarded the Coast Artillery Association Trophy.

=== Campaign streamers ===
World War II

251st CA (AA): Central Pacific and Northern Solomons

251st AAA Group: Luzon, Philippines

== See also ==
- List of Nike missile locations
