= Sarsfield Grenadier Guards =

The Sarsfield Grenadier Guards were a military company from California in the nineteenth century, mustered on July 29, 1870, in Sacramento. They were named after the Irish Jacobite Patrick Sarsfield, 1st Earl of Lucan. Its tradition is continued in Company B of the 184th Infantry Regiment.

== Formation ==
The Guards were mustered on July 29, 1870, as part of the California National Guard, with 33 men sworn in led by three officers - Captain W. H. Ashton, Jr., 1st Lieutenant Charles Brady and 2nd Lieutenant Thomas Nolan. Ashton left in 1870 and was replaced by Captain Henry Johnson, who was succeeded by Henry Lewis on March 16, 1871. By tradition officers of the Grenadier Guards were elected by the men, a practice that continued into the 20th century. The Guards were named after Patrick Sarsfield, and despite a lack of equipment and uniforms entered active service immediately. Members were mainly Irish or of Irish descent.

== Assignment ==
The Guards were assigned as Company G of the 4th California Infantry on February 19, 1872, and when the 4th was disbanded on March 31, 1877, the Guards were transferred to the 1st Infantry Battalion, 4th Brigade. On March 19, 1880, they became part of the 1st Artillery Regiment, 4th Brigade. On December 7, 1895, the 4th Brigade was broken up, reducing the number of brigades in California to three, and the Guards became Company G of the 11th Battalion, 3rd Brigade.

== Activities ==
The Guards acted as an escort for President Benjamin Harrison on his visit to Sacramento in 1891, and also acted as an escort on Grand Army of the Republic memorial day in 1892. During the railway strikes of 1894 the Guards were deployed to keep the peace, and after the 1906 San Francisco earthquake they were deployed on fire suppression and rescue duties.

The Guards served on the Mexican border from June 27, 1916, to April 9, 1917, where after the entry of the United States into World War I they were deployed in Europe.
