= 79th Infantry Brigade Combat Team =

- Shoulder sleeve insignia
- Active: 1917–19, 1921-42, 2008–present
- Country: United States
- Allegiance: California Army National Guard
- Branch: United States Army National Guard
- Type: Infantry
- Size: Brigade
- Part of: 40th Infantry Division
- Garrison/HQ: San Diego, California (HQ)
- Motto: Dominate the Fight
- Engagements: World War I: Battle of Saint-Mihiel; Meuse-Argonne Offensive; World War II: Central Pacific; Northern Solomons; Bismark Archipelago; Leyte; Southern Philippines; War on terrorism: Afghanistan; June 2025 Los Angeles protests
- Decorations: Philippine Presidential Unit Citation

Commanders
- Current commander: Colonel Brandon Hill
- Command Sergeant Major: CSM Peter Gutierrez

Insignia
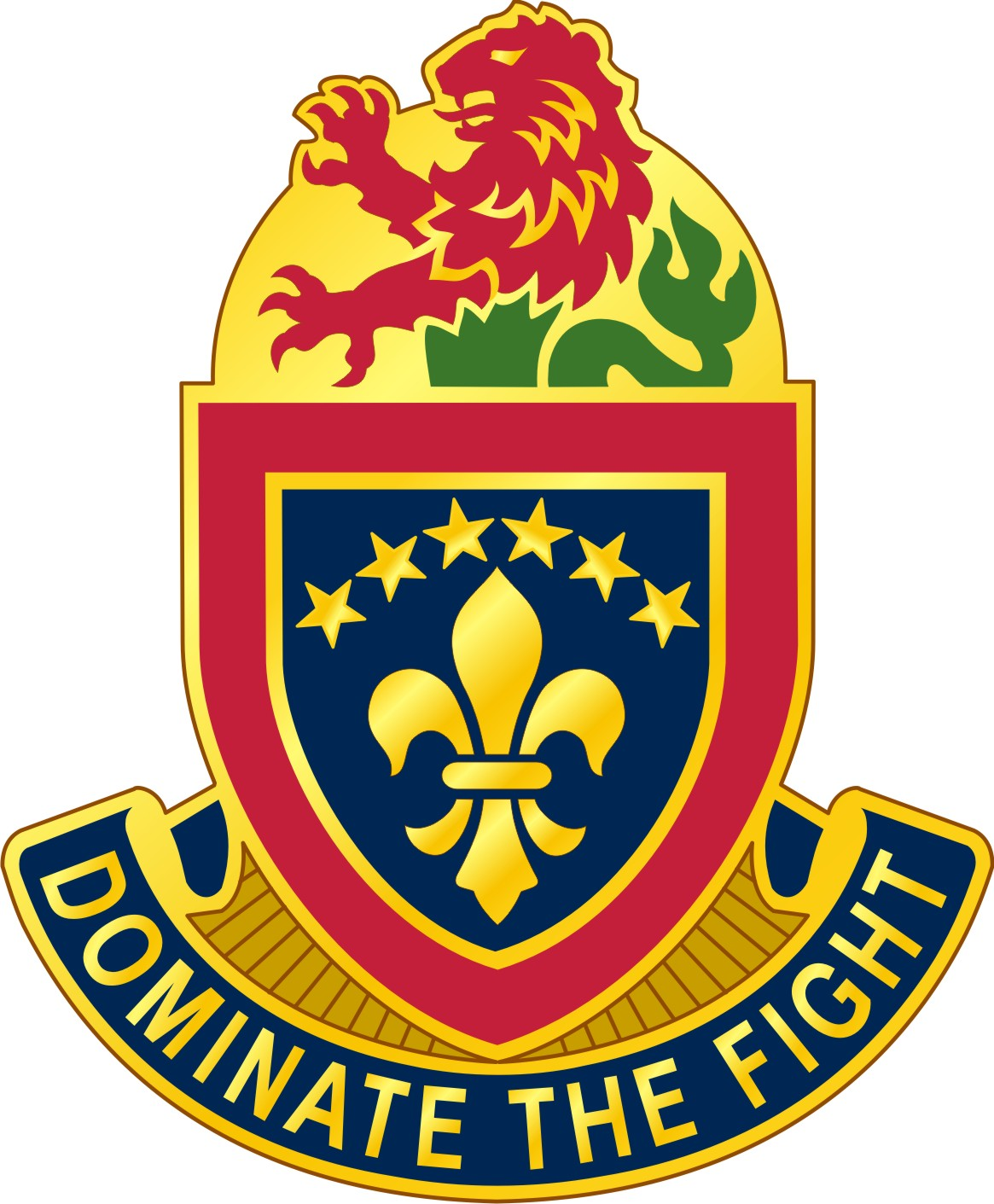
- Distinctive unit insignia

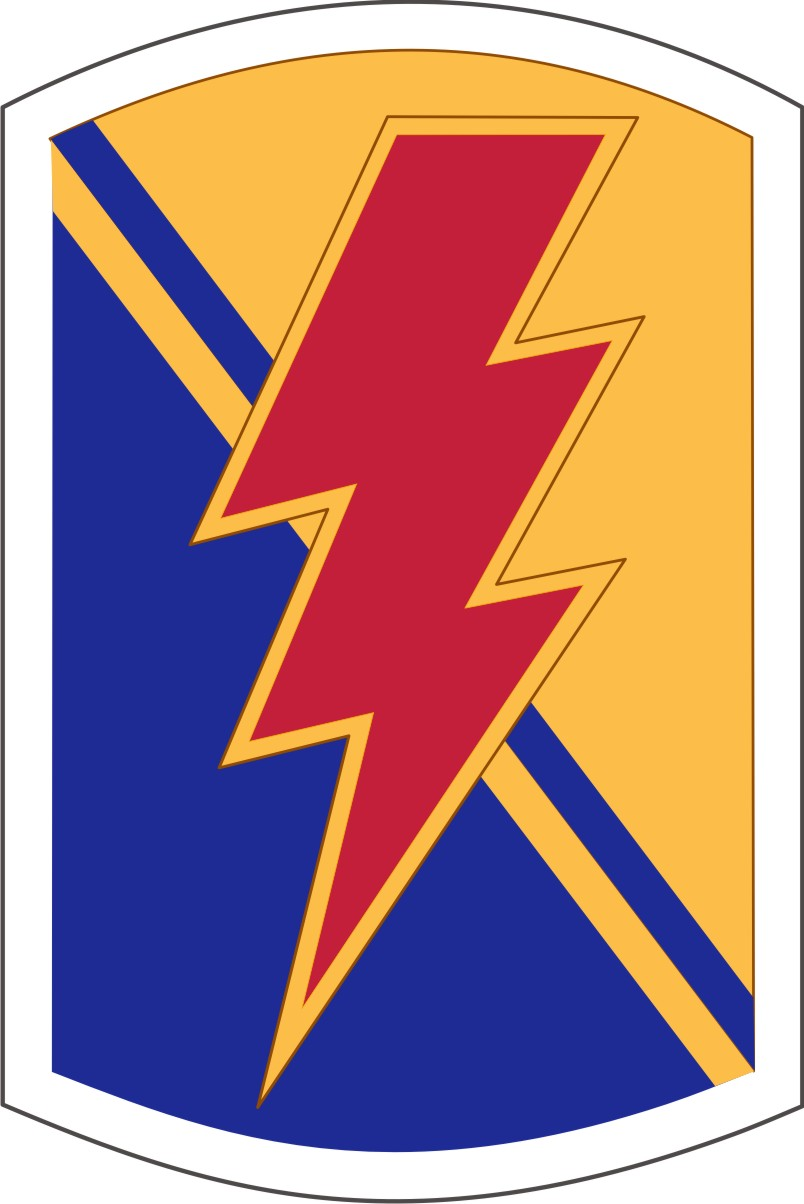
- Former SSI of 79th IBCT until 2025

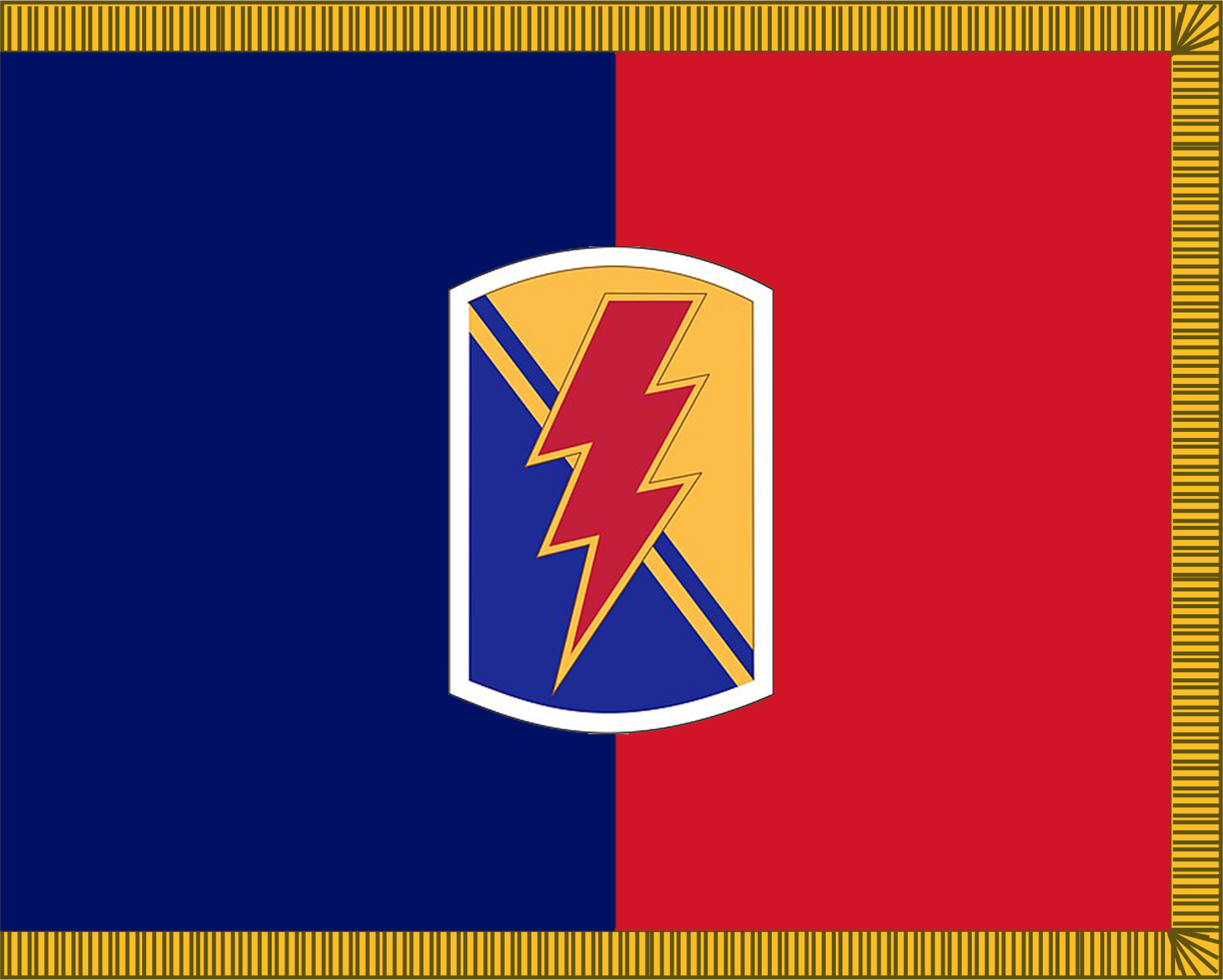
- 79th Infantry Brigade Flag

The 79th Infantry Brigade Combat Team is a modular infantry brigade of the United States Army and the California Army National Guard. Formed in 1917 from units of the San Diego City Guard, it served on the Western Front in the First World War and was disbanded in 1919, a year after the conflict ended. It was active again from 1921 to 1942 during the early days of the Second World War, and from that point onward remained dormant. In late 2008, the 40th Infantry Brigade Combat Team was redesignated the 79th Infantry Brigade Combat Team without changing its composition, inheriting the original unit's lineage.

== Unit history ==
Elements of the brigade can trace back their lineage to October 1881 when the San Diego City Guard was established, which later became the 251st Coast Artillery Regiment. The 79th Infantry Brigade was originally made up of the 157th and 158th Infantry Regiments (CO, AZ Army National Guard) and served as part of the 40th Division from Aug 1917-Apr 1919. From 1921 to 1942, it was exclusively made up of California Army National Guard personnel, the 159th and 184th Infantry Regiments. Its insignia reflected the three states that originally made up the 40th Division.

In February 1942, the 40th Infantry Division was reorganized from a 'square', two-brigade, four-regiment division to a three-regiment division without any intermediate brigade headquarters. Thus the 79th and 80th Infantry Brigades were deactivated. On 2 February 2010 the United States Army Institute of Heraldry approved a new shoulder patch and distinctive unit insignia for the 79th IBCT.

=== 2013 Afghanistan ===
In January 2013, the brigade headquarters was activated for deployment to the Uruzgan and Kandahar provinces in Afghanistan where they trained Afghan police and other forces. Twenty percent of the brigade have been previously deployed to Afghanistan before. In April 2013, approximately 75 Soldiers traveled to Camp Shelby, Mississippi to receive training for their Afghanistan mission. The group was reduced from the originally planned size of approximately 600 soldiers. Of the 75 Soldiers, 18 deployed as a security force assistance team serving as advisers to the Afghan police, and the rest staffed an Australian-led task force, all within Uruzgan province.

=== 2025 Los Angeles ===
In 2025, the unit's soldiers were deployed to Los Angeles after the federal government used Title 10 authority to activate the Guard in response to protests against heightened Immigration and Customs Enforcement activity in the area.

On July 15, 2025, of the National Guard's 79th Infantry Brigade Combat Team were withdrawn from Los Angeles by the Pentagon. This comes almost a week after the U.S. Northern Command General Gregory Guillot, requested to Secretary of Defense Pete Hegseth if 200 national guards could be withdrawn and redeployed as California was entering into peak wildfire season.

== Structure ==
The 40th IBCT was originally activated in 2007 as part of the reorganization of the California Army National Guard, which in turn was part of the restructuring of the total US Army. The 79th Infantry Brigade Combat Team was reformed from the previous 40th IBCT in September 2008.

The Army restructured and moved from the division to the brigade as the primary building block of combat power. The 79th Infantry Brigade Combat Team is organized under the Army's new modular brigade structure. The role of the brigade combat team is to act as the Army's basic tactical maneuver unit and the smallest combined-arms unit that can be committed independently. The brigade combat team is designed to conduct offensive, defensive, and stability operations. The core mission is to close with the enemy by means of fire and maneuver; to destroy or capture enemy forces; or to repel their attacks by fire, close combat, and counterattack. The brigade combat team can fight without augmentation, but it also can be tailored to meet the precise needs of its missions.

The 79th IBCT also has a state mission. In times of emergency, the Governor may call in the National Guard to assist civil authorities. The self-contained and modular structure of the 79th IBCT make it well suited to provide this support.

== Organization 2025 ==
- 79th Infantry Brigade Combat Team, in San Diego
  - Headquarters and Headquarters Company, 79th Infantry Brigade Combat Team, in San Diego
  - 1st Squadron, 18th Cavalry Regiment, in Azusa
    - Headquarters and Headquarters Troop, 1st Squadron, 18th Cavalry Regiment, in Azusa
    - Troop A, 1st Squadron, 18th Cavalry Regiment, in Azusa
    - Troop B, 1st Squadron, 18th Cavalry Regiment, in Azusa
    - Troop C (Dismounted), 1st Squadron, 18th Cavalry Regiment, in El Cajon
  - 1st Battalion, 65th Infantry Regiment, in Cayey (PR) (Puerto Rico Army National Guard)
    - Headquarters and Headquarters Company, 1st Battalion, 65th Infantry Regiment, in Cayey (PR)
    - Company A, 1st Battalion, 65th Infantry Regiment, in Aibonito (PR)
    - Company B, 1st Battalion, 65th Infantry Regiment, in Guayama (PR)
    - Company C, 1st Battalion, 65th Infantry Regiment, in Coamo (PR)
    - Company D (Weapons), 1st Battalion, 65th Infantry Regiment, in Cayey (PR)
  - 1st Battalion, 160th Infantry Regiment, in Inglewood
    - Headquarters and Headquarters Company, 1st Battalion, 160th Infantry Regiment, in Inglewood
    - Company A, 1st Battalion, 160th Infantry Regiment, in Fullerton
    - Company B, 1st Battalion, 160th Infantry Regiment, in San Bernardino
    - Company C, 1st Battalion, 160th Infantry Regiment, in Orange
    - Company D (Weapons), 1st Battalion, 160th Infantry Regiment, in Palmdale
    - Company G (Support), 1st Battalion, 160th Infantry Regiment, in Santa Ana
  - 1st Battalion, 184th Infantry Regiment, in Modesto
    - Headquarters and Headquarters Company, 1st Battalion, 184th Infantry Regiment, in Modesto
    - Company A, 1st Battalion, 184th Infantry Regiment, in Visalia
    - Company B, 1st Battalion, 184th Infantry Regiment, at Camp Parks
    - Company C, 1st Battalion, 184th Infantry Regiment, in Sacramento
    - Company D (Weapons), 1st Battalion, 184th Infantry Regiment, in Oakdale
  - 1st Battalion, 143rd Field Artillery Regiment, in Richmond
    - Headquarters and Headquarters Battery, 1st Battalion, 143rd Field Artillery Regiment, in Richmond
      - Detachment 1, Headquarters and Headquarters Battery, 1st Battalion, 143rd Field Artillery Regiment, in Los Angeles
    - Battery A, 1st Battalion, 143rd Field Artillery Regiment, in Sacramento
    - Battery B, 1st Battalion, 143rd Field Artillery Regiment, in Fresno
      - Detachment 1, Battery B, 1st Battalion, 143rd Field Artillery Regiment, in Ventura
    - Battery C, 1st Battalion, 143rd Field Artillery Regiment, in Bakersfield
  - 578th Brigade Engineer Battalion, in Manhattan Beach
    - Headquarters and Headquarters Company, 578th Brigade Engineer Battalion, in Manhattan Beach
    - Company A (Combat Engineer), 578th Brigade Engineer Battalion, in El Centro
    - Company B (Combat Engineer), 578th Brigade Engineer Battalion, in Escondido
    - Company C (Signal), 578th Brigade Engineer Battalion, in San Diego
    - Company D (Military Intelligence), 578th Brigade Engineer Battalion, in San Diego
      - Detachment 1, Company D (Military Intelligence), 578th Brigade Engineer Battalion, at Camp Roberts (RQ-28A UAV)
  - 40th Brigade Support Battalion, in Bell
    - Headquarters and Headquarters Company, 40th Brigade Support Battalion, in Bell
    - Company A (Distribution), 40th Brigade Support Battalion, in Bell
    - Company B (Maintenance), 40th Brigade Support Battalion, in Bell
    - Company C (Medical), 40th Brigade Support Battalion, in Bell
    - Company D (Forward Support), 40th Brigade Support Battalion, in Azusa — attached to 1st Squadron, 18th Cavalry Regiment
    - Company E (Forward Support), 40th Brigade Support Battalion, in San Diego — attached to 578th Brigade Engineer Battalion
    - Company F (Forward Support), 40th Brigade Support Battalion, in Walnut Creek — attached to 1st Battalion, 143rd Field Artillery Regiment
    - Company G (Forward Support), 40th Brigade Support Battalion, in Santa Ana — attached to 1st Battalion, 160th Infantry Regiment
    - Company H (Forward Support), 40th Brigade Support Battalion, in Fresno — attached to 1st Battalion, 184th Infantry Regiment
    - Company I (Forward Support), 40th Brigade Support Battalion, in Cayey (PR) — attached to 1st Battalion, 65th Infantry Regiment (Puerto Rico Army National Guard)
