= 160th Infantry Regiment (United States) =

Infantry regiment of the United States Army

160th Infantry Regiment (Seventh California)
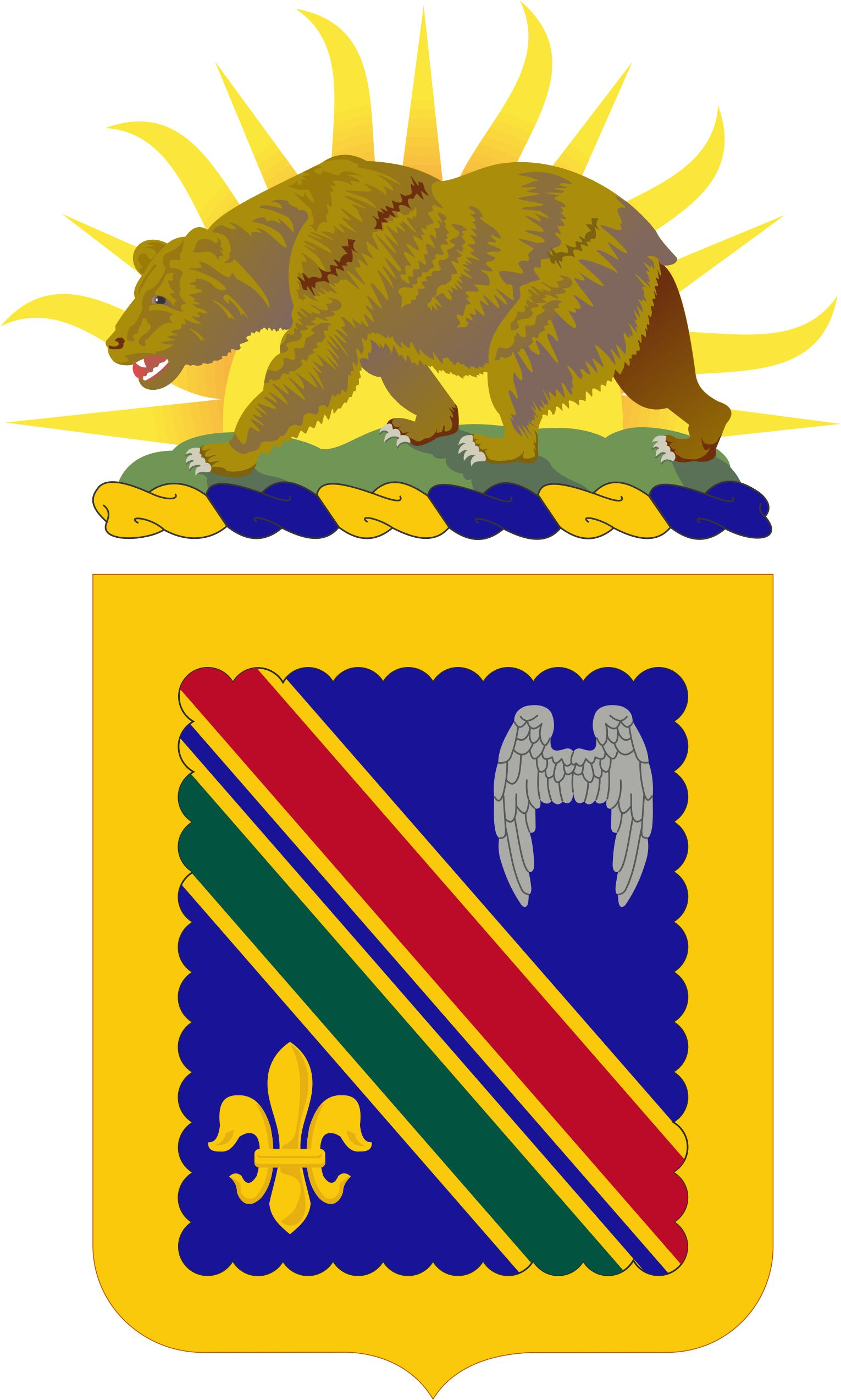
- 160th Infantry Regiment Coat of Arms
- Active: 1898–present
- Country: United States
- Allegiance: California
- Branch: Army
- Type: Infantry
- Size: Regiment
- Part of: California Army National Guard
- Garrison/HQ: Inglewood, California
- Nickname: "Seventh California"
- Motto: All In
- Facings: Light blue
- Engagements: World War I World War II; Iraq War; Operation Spartan Shield; Operation Inherent Resolve
- Decorations: Army Superior Unit Award (2); Philippine Presidential Unit Citation; Republic of Korea Presidential Unit Citation; California National Guard Commanding General's Meritorious Unit Citation

Commanders
- Current Commander: Lt. Col. Leroy Cisneros
- Notable commanders: Benjamin O. Turnage Jr. Archelaus L. Hamblen Jr.

Insignia
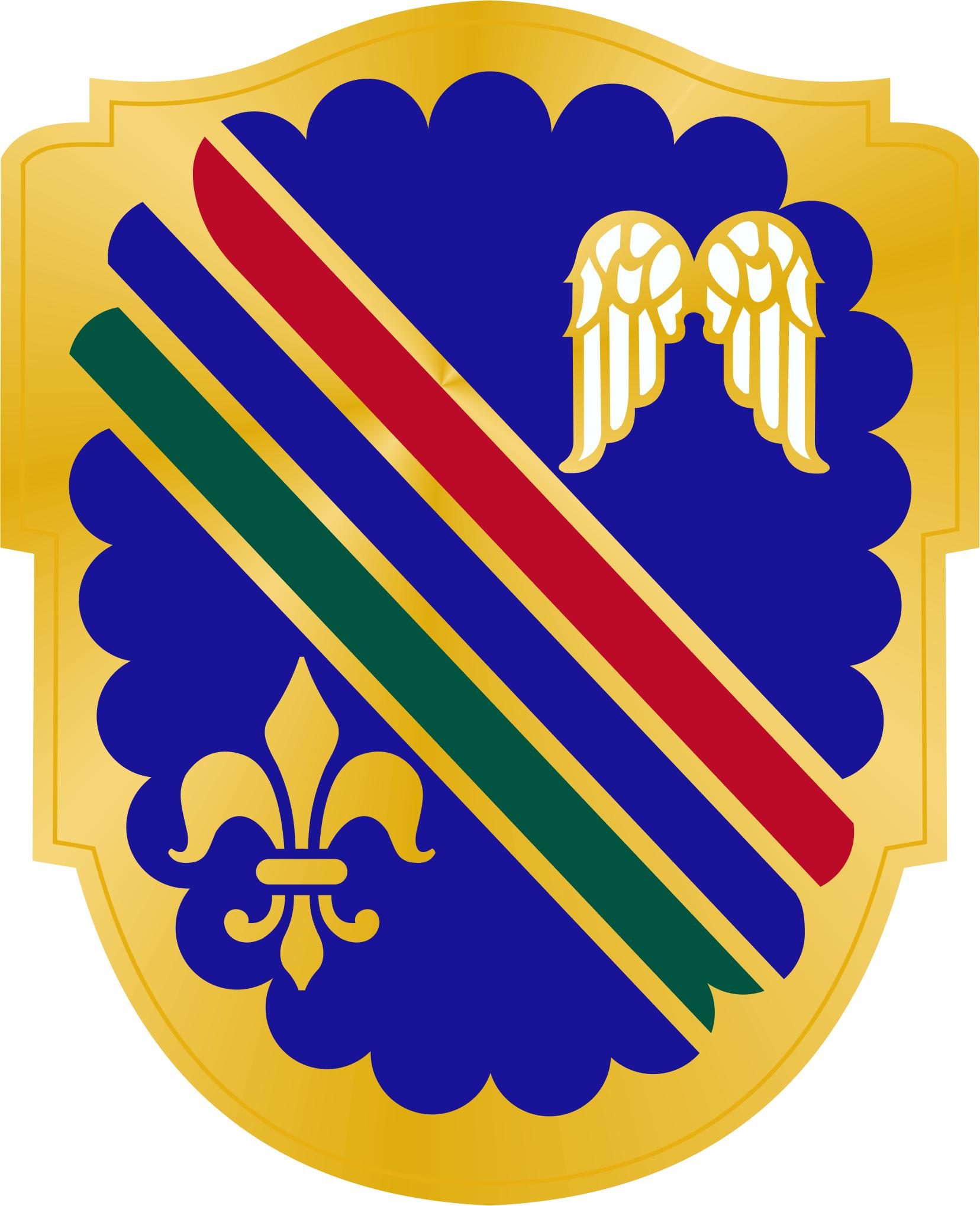
- Regimental Insignia

The 160th Infantry Regiment (Seventh California) is an infantry regiment of the United States Army. The 1st Battalion, 160th Infantry is a light infantry component of the 79th Infantry Brigade Combat Team (IBCT).

Originally designated the 7th California, the 160th Infantry Regiment traces their lineage back to the early days of California statehood when the call went out and 17,000 men volunteered for service in the Civil War under the 7th Regiment California Volunteer Infantry. The 1st Battalion, 160th Infantry, is headquartered in the Inglewood Armory, which houses a Regimental room dedicated to preserving the rich history of the 160th Infantry Regiment.

== History ==
The regiment traces its history to the 7th Infantry Battalion, formed 1885, and became the 7th Infantry Regiment three years later. The regiment was formed during the Spanish–American War in 1898. Its initial training took place at the Presidio of San Francisco. It later served under General John J. Pershing during the Mexican Border Campaign of 1914. During World War I, the regiment participated in the French Meuse-Argonne Offensive in 1918 and the Battle of St. Mihiel. During the Meuse-Argonne Offensive, units of the 160th Regiment along with units of the 307th Infantry Regiment became known as the "Lost Battalion." Captain Nelson Holderman, a member of the 160th Regiment, was awarded the Medal of Honor during the Lost Battalion action.

=== Interwar period ===
The 160th Infantry arrived at the port of New York on 24 March 1919 on the troopship USS Matsonia and was demobilized on 7 May 1919 at Camp Kearny, California. Per the National Defense Act of 1920, the 160th Infantry was reconstituted in the National Guard in 1921, assigned to the 40th Division, and allotted to the state of California. It was reorganized 23 August–6 October 1921 in southern California. The regimental headquarters was organized 31 January 1922 and federally recognized at Los Angeles, California. The 1st Battalion was involved in a train collision on 19 July 1925 near Santa Barbara, California, on its way back from summer training. The regiment, or elements thereof, called up to perform the following state duties: entire regiment to perform earthquake relief operations 14–22 March 1933 in the Los Angeles area; entire regiment to perform riot control during the San Francisco street car workers’ strike, 5–21 July 1934. The regiment conducted annual summer training at Del Monte, California, and Camp San Luis Obispo, California. The regiment's armory in Los Angeles hosted the fencing competition at the 1932 Summer Olympics as well as the fencing part of the modern pentathlon.

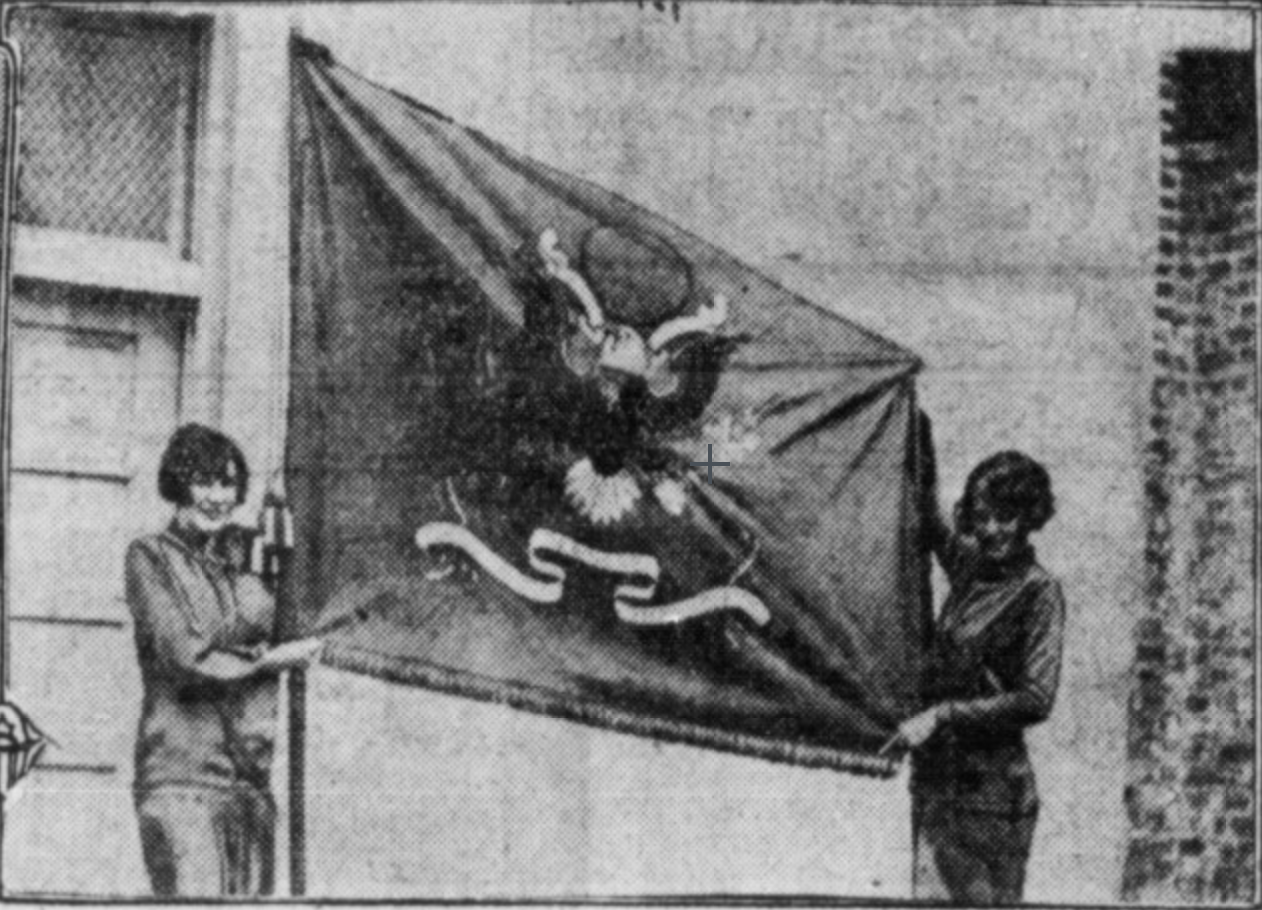
Regimental flag, 1925

=== World War II ===
As part of the United States mobilization during World War II, the 160th was federalized at Los Angeles, California, on 3 March 1941 and moved to Camp San Luis Obispo, California, within two weeks. The regiment trained there for over a year as part of the 40th Division before relocating to Fort Lewis, Washington, on 29 April 1942. From there, the regiment went to San Francisco, on 1 September 1942, and was shipped to Hawaii the following month.

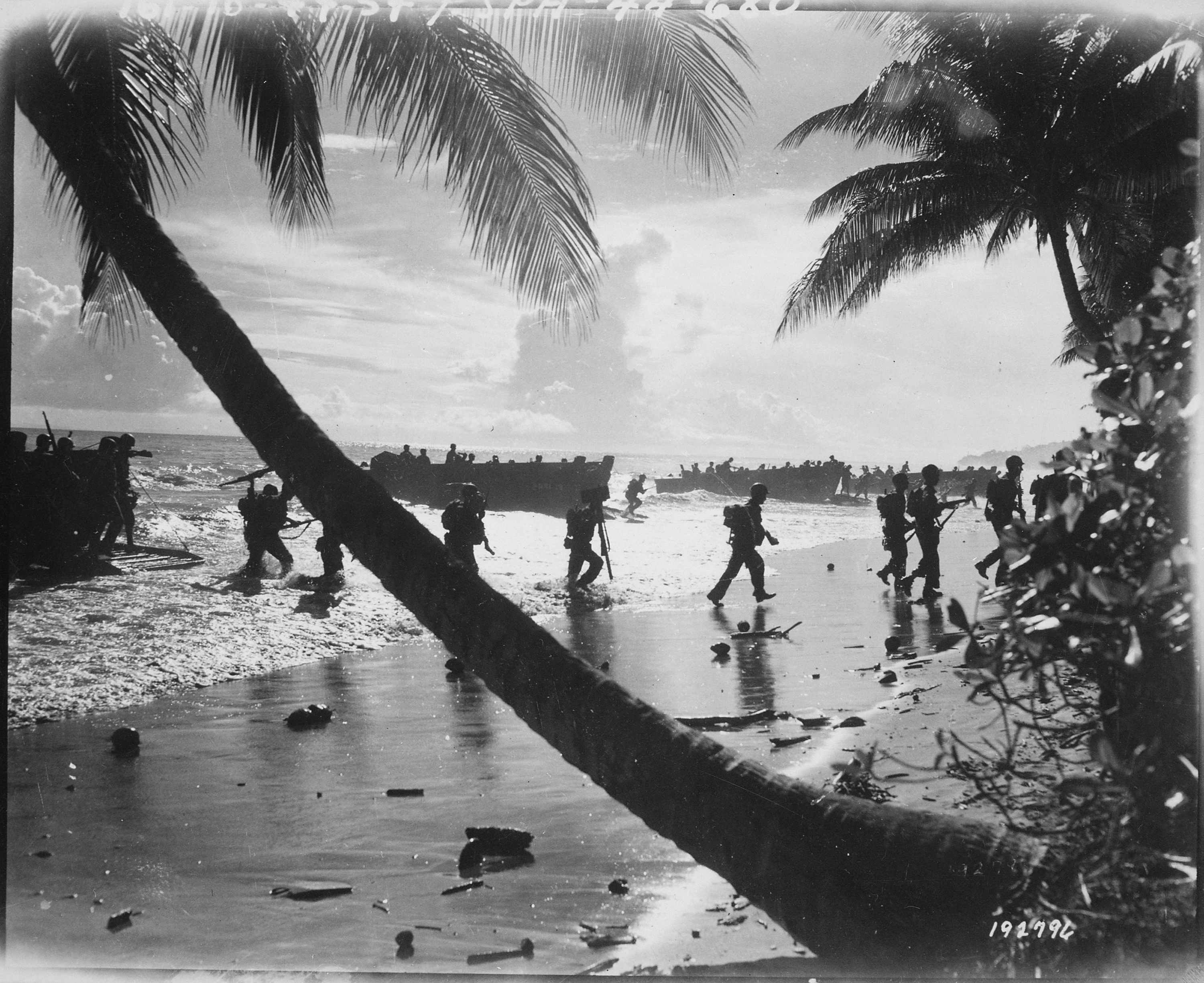
March 1944: Troops of the 160th Infantry Regiment rush ashore from a landing boat during amphibious training at Guadalcanal.

The regiment trained in jungle warfare there for over a year before being moved forward during January 1944 to the Solomon Islands. From April through December the regiment fought on New Britain Island during the New Britain campaign. The regiment redeployed through New Guinea and they invaded the Japanese-held Philippines on 9 January 1945. The regiment participated in various actions in the Philippines' Campaign (1944 to 1945) during the rest of the war.

Lt. Col. Ryoichi Tozuka, the commander of the Imperial Japanese Army in Panay Island, signed the document of surrender at Cabatuan Airfield, located in Cabatuan, Iloilo, Panay Island, Philippines, on 2 September 1945, the same day as the surrender signing in Japan aboard the U.S.S. Missouri. This was accepted by Col. Raymond G. Stanton, comdg the 160th U.S. Infantry regiment, and was attended by Rear Admiral Ralph O. Davis, comdg the U.S. Navy's 13th Amphibious Group, and by Brig. Gen. Donald J. Myers, comdg the 40th Infantry Division. The 13th Amphibious Group was tasked to transport the 40th U.S. Infantry Division to Korea.

The regiment returned to San Francisco on 5 April 1946 and was inactivated the next day. For actions in the Zambales Mountains, Company I was awarded a Presidential Unit Citation.

=== Korea ===
The 160th Regiment was called up for active duty in September 1950 a couple months after the Korean War began. The regiment deployed to Japan with the 40th Infantry Division in March 1951 where it engaged in several months of training before shipping out to South Korea in February 1952 as part of the 40th Infantry Division. The 160th served for the last fifteen months of combat in Korea and then returned to California with the 40th in June 1954 and was released from Federal service.

=== Post–Korea to present ===
As part of the United States National Guard, the unit was not mobilized for Vietnam, but engaged in suppressing civil disturbances. During the 1965 Watts Riots in Los Angeles, the 160th Regiment was among the first units deployed. They were also activated during the 1992 Los Angeles riots in the wake of the Rodney King trial. Following the 1994 Northridge earthquake, the regiment provided humanitarian aid and security to the area affected by the earthquake.

Company B of 1st Battalion was awarded a Meritorious Unit Commendation for their service in Iraq in 2004 and 2005, and the remainder of 1st Battalion was awarded an Army Superior Unit Award for service in Kosovo during a similar period. The regiment served in Kuwait and Iraq during Operation Iraqi Freedom from 15 February 2007 through 8 August 2008; during this period Company C of 3d battalion was awarded a Meritorious Unit Commendation, and two soldiers from the regiment were killed.

During the George Floyd Protests, the unit was one of the first to be mobilized among the California National Guard on 29 May 2020.

== Timeline ==
- Constituted 22 July 1885 in the California National Guard as the 7th Infantry Battalion and organized from existing companies in southern California
- Expanded, reorganized, and redesignated on 5 May 1888, as the 7th Infantry Regiment
- Consolidated 7 December 1895 with the 9th Infantry Regiment (organized on 8 February 1890 in the California National Guard) and consolidated unit designated as the 7th Infantry Regiment
- Mustered into Federal service on 9 May 1898 at the Presidio of San Francisco as the 7th California Volunteer Infantry; mustered out of Federal service on 2 December 1898 at Los Angeles
- Mustered into Federal service on 29 June 1916 at Sacramento; mustered out of Federal service 11 November 1916 at Los Angeles
- Drafted into Federal service 5 August 1917
- Consolidated 25 September to 1 November 1917 with the 2nd Battalion, Companies L and M, and the Sanitary Detachment, 2nd Infantry Regiment, California National Guard; consolidated unit concurrently reorganized and re-designated as the 160th Infantry and assigned to the 40th Division
- Demobilized on 7 May 1919 at Camp Kearny, California
- Former southern California elements reorganized on 23 August to 6 October 1921 in the California National Guard as the 160th Infantry and assigned to the 40th Division; Headquarters Federally recognized on 31 January 1922 at Los Angeles
- 2nd Battalion, 160th Infantry, withdrawn, reorganized, and re-designated on 1 April 1929 as the 2nd Battalion, 185th Infantry, an element of the 40th Division (160th Infantry – hereafter separate lineage)
- Expanded and reorganized March to April 1930, as the 2nd and 3rd Battalions, 185th Infantry, elements of the 40th Division (later redesignated as the 40th Infantry Division)
- Inducted into Federal service on 3 March 1941 at home stations
- Inactivated on 7 April 1946 at Camp Stoneman, California
- 2nd and 3rd Battalions, 185th Infantry, re-designated on 5 August 1946 as the 223rd and 224th Infantry and remained assigned to the 40th Infantry Division
- After 5 August 1946, the above units underwent changes as follows:
- 223rd Infantry reorganized as well as Federally recognizing on 15 October 1946 with headquarters at Pasadena ordered into active Federal service on 1 September 1950, at home stations
- (223d Infantry (NGUS) organized and Federally recognized on 2 September 1952, with headquarters at Pasadena) Released 30 June 1954, from active Federal service and reverted to state control. Federal recognition concurrently withdrawn from the 223rd Infantry (NGUS)1st Battalion, 223rd Infantry, reorganized and redesignated on 1 July 1954, as the 223rd Armored Infantry Battalion. This is an element of the 40th Armored Division, with headquarters at Glendale (remainder of 223rd Infantry – hereafter separate lineages)
- 224th Infantry reorganized and Federally recognized on 15 October 1946, with headquarters at Ontario ordered into active Federal service on 1 September 1950 at home stations
- (224th Infantry [NGUS] organized and Federally recognized on 2 September 1952, with headquarters at Ontario) Released 30 June 1954 from active Federal service and reverted to state control; Federal recognition concurrently withdrawn from the 224th Infantry (NGUS)1st and 3rd Battalions
- 224th Infantry, reorganized and re-designated on 1 July 1954, respectively as the 224th Armored Infantry Battalion, with headquarters at San Bernardino, and the 161st Armored Infantry Battalion, with headquarters at Orange (changed 1 November 1957 to Santa Ana), elements of the 40th Armored Division (remainder of 224th Infantry – hereafter separate lineages)
- 161st, 223rd, and 224th Armored Infantry Battalions consolidated, reorganized, and re-designated on 1 July 1959 as the 160th Infantry, a parent regiment under the Combat Arms Regimental System, to consist of the 1st, 2nd, 3rd, and 4th Rifle Battalions, elements of the 40th Armored Division
- Reorganized on 1 March 1963, to consist of the 1st, 2nd, 3rd, and 4th Battalions, elements of the 40th Armored Division
- Reorganized on 1 November 1965, to consist of the 1st, 2nd, and 3rd Battalions, elements of the 40th Armored Division, and the 4th Battalion, an element of the 29th Infantry Brigade
- Reorganized on 29 January 1968, to consist of the 1st, 2nd, and 3rd Battalions, elements of the 40th Infantry Brigade, and the 4th Battalion, an element of the 40th Armored Brigade
- Reorganized on 13 January 1974, to consist of the 1st, 2nd, 3rd, and 4th Battalions, elements of the 40th Infantry Division
- Reorganized 1 August 1985 to consist of the 2nd, 3rd, and 4th Battalions, elements of the 40th Infantry Division
- Withdrawn on 19 January 1988, from the Combat Arms Regimental System and reorganized under the United States Army Regimental System
- (2nd, 3rd, and 4th Battalions ordered into active Federal service on 2 May 1992, at home stations; released on 9 May 1992, from active Federal service and reverted to state control)

== Distinctive unit insignia ==
- Description: A Gold color metal and enamel device 1 1/8 inches (2.86 cm) in height blazoned: Azure, two bendlets Gules and Vert fimbriated Or between an angel's wings conjoined and inverted Argent and a fleur-de-lis, within a diminished bordure engrailed of the fourth.
- Symbolism: The shield is blue for Infantry. The red bendlet denotes service during the Spanish War and the green bendlet, Mexican border duty. The angel's wings represent Los Angeles, the headquarters of the 160th Infantry, and the fleur-de-lis symbolizes World War I service. The gold engrailed border symbolizes the State of California on the shores of the Pacific Ocean.
- Background: The distinctive unit insignia was originally approved for the 160th Infantry Regiment on 22 May 1928. It was redesignated for the 160th Armored Infantry Battalion on 7 January 1955. The insignia was redesignated for the 160th Infantry Regiment on 24 April 1961.

== See also ==
- 18th Cavalry Regiment (United States)
- James Stuart McKnight, trained officers during World War I
- Captain Nelson Holderman, Medal of Honor recipient
- John C. Sjogren, Medal of Honor recipient
- Tom Selleck, Actor
- 160th Infantry Blackjack Association
