= 49th Infantry Division (United States) =

49th Infantry Division (1947–1968) 52nd Infantry Division (1946–1947)
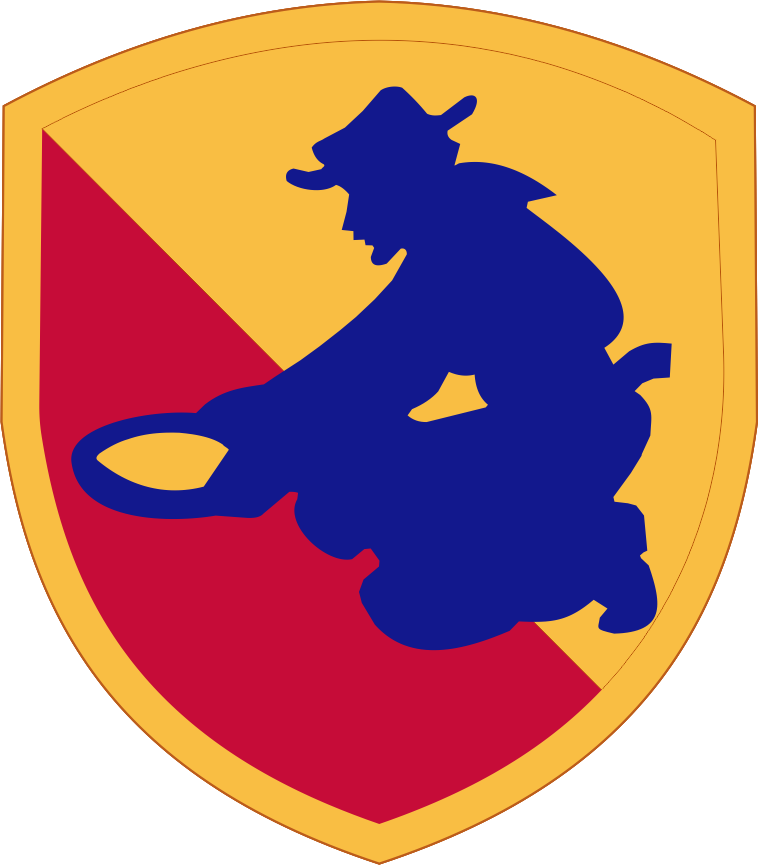
- 49th Infantry Division shoulder sleeve insignia
- Active: 1946–1947 (52nd Infantry Division); 1947–1968 (49th Infantry Division)
- Country: United States
- Branch: United States Army
- Type: Infantry
- Size: Division
- Garrison/HQ: Based in California
- Nickname(s): 49'ers, Argonauts

The 49th Infantry Division was a unit of the United States Army National Guard during the Cold War.

It was formed from the 52nd Infantry Division, which had itself been activated in 1946 during the expansion of National Guard after the end of World War II. The 52nd was renumbered as the 49th in 1947 due to the centennial of the California Gold Rush. It was inactivated in 1968 during a reorganization of the Army National Guard.

== History ==
The 52nd Infantry Division was activated on 15 August 1946, and was allocated to the State of California as a National Guard division during the post World War II demobilization. The division was to be headquartered in the area of the "49'ers" of the California Gold Rush. To mark the upcoming centenary of the 1849 gold rush, the state of California requested that the designation of the 52nd Infantry Division be changed to the 49th Infantry Division.

The change was approved by a National Guard Bureau Letter, CSNGB, dated 24 October 1947, Subject: "Change in Designation of 52d Infantry Division" and an Adjutant General Letter, AGAO-I 325 dated 20 October 1947, Subject: "Allotment of National Guard Units (California)". The change was made retroactive to 5 August 1946, the formation of the original 52nd Infantry Division. The new division was known as the "Argonaut Division", and its shoulder sleeve insignia depicted a 49'er panning for gold. The nickname refers to the 49'ers, who were also known as Argonauts. The 49th Infantry Division was inactivated on 29 January 1968.
