= Infantry Branch (United States) =

Infantry branch of the U.S. Army

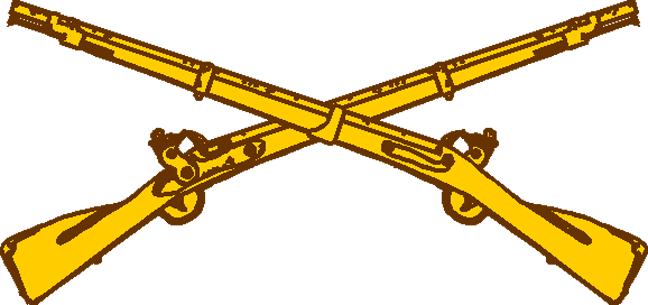
- Branch insignia, worn on the left collar of some U.S. Army uniforms.
- Founded: 14 June 1775
- Country: United States
- Branch: United States Army
- Home station: Fort Benning, Georgia
- Nickname: "Queen of Battle"
- Motto: "Follow me!"
- Branch color: Saxony blue
- Engagements: Revolutionary War; Indian Wars; War of 1812; Mexican–American War; Utah War; American Civil War; Spanish–American War; Philippine–American War; Banana Wars; Boxer Rebellion; Border War; World War I Russian Civil War; World War II; Korean War; Operation Power Pack; Vietnam War; Operation Eagle Claw; Invasion of Grenada; Operation Golden Pheasant; Invasion of Panama; Persian Gulf War; Somali Civil War; Kosovo War; War in Afghanistan; Iraq War; Operation Inherent Resolve

Commanders
- Chief of Infantry: BG Phillip J. Kiniery III

Insignia
- Shoulder cord

The Infantry Branch is a branch of the United States Army first established in 1775.

== History ==
Six companies of expert riflemen were authorized by a resolution of the Continental Congress on 14 June 1775. However, the oldest Regular Army infantry regiment, the 3rd Infantry Regiment, was constituted on 3 June 1784, as the First American Regiment.

=== 18th century ===
On 3 March 1791, Congress added to the Army "The Second Regiment of Infantry"

- An Act of Congress on 16 July 1798 authorized twelve additional regiments of infantry
- An Act of Congress on 11 January 1812 increased the Regular Army to 46 infantry and 4 rifle regiments
- An Act of Congress on 3 March 1815 reduced the Regular Army from the 46 infantry and 4 rifle regiments it fielded in the War of 1812 to a peacetime establishment of 8 infantry regiments, further reduced to 7 in 1821. The origins of the Army's current regimental numbering system dates from this act.

=== 19th century ===
The Army organized into seven infantry regiments, 1821;

- 1st Infantry Regiment
- 2nd Infantry Regiment
- 3rd Infantry Regiment
- 4th Infantry Regiment
- 5th Infantry Regiment
- 6th Infantry Regiment
- 7th Infantry Regiment
- 8th Infantry Regiment (added in 1838)

Ten one-year regiments were authorized by an Act of Congress on 11 February 1847 because of the Mexican–American War, but only the 9th through 16th Infantry Regiments were activated; they did not re-form permanently until the 1850s and 1860s.

- 9th Infantry Regiment (United States) (added in 1855)
- 10th Infantry Regiment (United States) (added in 1855)

Civil War expansion to 19 regiments;

- 11th Infantry Regiment
- 12th Infantry Regiment
- 13th Infantry Regiment
- 14th Infantry Regiment
- 15th Infantry Regiment
- 16th Infantry Regiment
- 17th Infantry Regiment
- 18th Infantry Regiment
- 19th Infantry Regiment

In a major expansion under General Order 92, War Department, 23 November 1866, pursuant to an act of Congress of 28 July 1866 (14 Stat. 332), the 2nd and 3rd battalions of the existing 11th through 19th Infantry Regiments were expanded and designated as the 20th through 37th Infantry Regiments. Four new regiments (the 38th through 41st) were to be composed of black enlisted men, and the new 42nd through 45th Infantry Regiments for wounded veterans of the Civil War.

- 20th Infantry Regiment
- 21st Infantry Regiment
- 22nd Infantry Regiment
- 23rd Infantry Regiment
- 24th Infantry Regiment
- 25th Infantry Regiment

This was reduced by consolidation to 25 regiments under General Order 17, War Department, 15 March 1869, with the 24th and 25th Infantry Regiments constituting the black enlisted force. On 2 February 1901, Congress passed the Army Reorganization Act, which authorized five additional regiments, the 26th through 30th;

- 26th Infantry Regiment
- 27th Infantry Regiment
- 28th Infantry Regiment
- 29th Infantry Regiment
- 30th Infantry Regiment

=== 20th century ===
The Militia Act of 1903 standardized the regulations, organization, equipage, and training of state militia force, forming the genesis of the modern National Guard (see Militia (United States)).

In 1916, Congress enacted the National Defense Act and under War Department General Orders Number 22 dated 30 June 1916 that ordered seven new regiments to be organized; four in the Continental United States, one in the Philippine Islands (32nd Infantry Regiment), one in Hawaii (32nd Infantry Regiment), and one, the 33rd Infantry Regiment, in the Canal Zone.

- 31st Infantry Regiment
- 32nd Infantry Regiment
- 33rd Infantry Regiment
- 34th Infantry Regiment
- 35th Infantry Regiment
- 36th Infantry Regiment
- 37th Infantry Regiment

In 1917, a new numbering system was set up. Infantry regimental numbers 1 through 100 were allotted to the Regular Army, 101 through 300 to the National Guard, and 301 and up to the National Army. 167 National Guard units were re-organized and re-numbered from the previously used state system to the new federal system; the 71st New York Infantry Regiment was able to lobby to keep their old 19th century number which violated this numbering rule while serving on the Mexican border in 1916; however, the unit was broken up and most of its troops assigned to the 27th Division after re-federalization in 1917. The 71st was re-formed in 1919 and served in World War II as the 71st Infantry Regiment. In the 1990s the 165th Infantry Regiment (formerly the 69th New York Infantry Regiment) reverted to its old number as the 69th Infantry Regiment.

- 38th Infantry Regiment
- 39th Infantry Regiment
- 40th Infantry Regiment
- 41st Infantry Regiment
- 42nd Infantry Regiment
- 43rd Infantry Regiment (reorganized in April 1921 as a Philippine Scouts unit)
- 44th Infantry Regiment (reorganized in April 1921 as a Philippine Scouts unit)
- 45th Infantry Regiment (reorganized in April 1921 as a Philippine Scouts unit)
- 46th Infantry Regiment
- 47th Infantry Regiment
- 48th Infantry Regiment
- 49th Infantry Regiment
- 50th Infantry Regiment
- 51st Infantry Regiment
- 52nd Infantry Regiment
- 53rd Infantry Regiment
- 54th Infantry Regiment
- 55th Infantry Regiment
- 56th Infantry Regiment
- 57th Infantry Regiment (reorganized in April 1921 as a Philippine Scouts unit)
- 58th Infantry Regiment
- 59th Infantry Regiment
- 60th Infantry Regiment
- 61st Infantry Regiment
- 62nd Infantry Regiment
- 63rd Infantry Regiment
- 64th Infantry Regiment
- 65th Infantry Regiment (reorganized by the Reorganization Act of 4 June 1920 from the Puerto Rico Regiment)
- 66th Infantry Regiment
- 67th Infantry Regiment
- 68th Infantry Regiment
- 69th Infantry Regiment (United States) (the "Federal" 69th Infantry, not associated with the New York state unit)
- 70th Infantry Regiment
- 71st Infantry Regiment (the "Federal" 71st Infantry, not associated with the New York State unit; briefly existed in the 11th Division in World War I)
- 72nd Infantry Regiment
- 73rd Infantry Regiment
- 74th Infantry Regiment (redesignated from the 474th Infantry Regiment in 1954)
- 75th Infantry Regiment
- 75th Infantry Regiment (Ranger) (uses the number of the 75th Infantry Regiment, but does not carry on its lineage)
- 76th Infantry Regiment
- 77th Infantry Regiment (Philippine Scouts)
- 78th Infantry Regiment (Philippine Scouts)
- 79th Infantry Regiment (Philippine Scouts)
- 80th Infantry Regiment
- 81st Infantry Regiment
- 82nd Infantry Regiment
- 83rd Infantry Regiment
- 84th Infantry Regiment
- 85th Infantry Regiment
- 86th Infantry Regiment
- 87th Infantry Regiment
- 88th Infantry Regiment
- 89th Infantry Regiment
- 90th Infantry Regiment
- 91st Infantry Regiment
- The 92nd through 100th Infantry Regiments were never constituted

A new system, the U.S. Army Combat Arms Regimental System, or CARS, was adopted in 1957 to replace the old regimental system. CARS uses the Army's traditional regiments as parent organizations for historical purposes, but the primary building blocks are divisions, and brigades composed of battalions. Each battalion of a brigade carries an association with a parent regiment, even though the regimental organization (i.e., an organized headquarters) generally no longer exists. In some brigades, several numbered battalions carrying the same regimental association may still serve together, and tend to consider themselves part of their traditional regiment when in fact they are independent battalions serving a brigade, rather than a regimental, headquarters. The CARS was replaced by the U.S. Army Regimental System (USARS) in 1981, which requires soldiers to "affiliate" with a regiment of their choice, increasing esprit de corps and the possibility of soldiers serving multiple assignments with the same regiment.

=== 21st century ===
There are exceptions to USARS regimental titles, including the Armored Cavalry Regiments and the 75th Ranger Regiment created in 1986. On 1 October 2005, the word "regiment" was formally appended to the name of all active and inactive CARS and USARS regiments. So, for example, the 1st Cavalry officially became titled the 1st Cavalry Regiment. There are approximately 19,000 U.S. military personnel in and around Afghanistan. Troops currently in Afghanistan represent the sixth major troop rotation in Operation Enduring Freedom (OEF) since the United States became involved in the fall of 2001. At present, the majority of U.S. ground forces come from the Army’s Italy-based 173rd Airborne Brigade and the 1st Brigade of the Fort Bragg, North Carolina–based 82nd Airborne Division and Marine elements from the Second (II) MEF from Camp Lejeune, North Carolina. U.S. Special Forces are also operating in Afghanistan and are primarily concerned with capturing or killing Taliban and Al Qaeda leaders. In addition, Army units from the Florida National Guard’s 53rd Infantry Brigade have been deployed to train the Afghan National Army.

== Chief of Infantry ==
From 1920 to 1942, the Infantry branch was led by the Chief of Infantry, who held the temporary rank of major general. This individual had responsibility for doctrine, training, equipment fielding, and other matters. During World War II, the duties of the branch chiefs, including Infantry, Cavalry, Field Artillery, Coast Artillery, were taken over by the commander of Army Ground Forces. Individuals who served as Chief of Infantry included:

- Major General Charles S. Farnsworth, July 1, 1920 – March 27, 1925
- Major General Robert H. Allen, March 28, 1925 – March 27, 1929
- Major General Stephen O. Fuqua, March 28, 1929 – May 5, 1933
- Major General Edward Croft, May 6, 1933 – April 30, 1937
- Major General George A. Lynch, May 24, 1937 – April 30, 1941
- Major General Courtney H. Hodges, May 31, 1941 – March 9, 1942

== Branch insignia ==
Two gold color crossed muskets, vintage 1795 Springfield musket (Model 1795 Musket), 3/4 inch in height.

Crossed muskets were first introduced into the U.S. Army as the insignia of officers and enlisted men of the Infantry on 19 November 1875 (War Department General Order No. 96 dtd 19 Nov 1875) to take effect on or before 1 June 1876. Numerous attempts in the earlier years were made to keep the insignia current with the ever-changing styles of rifles being introduced into the Army. However, in 1924 the branch insignia was standardized by the adoption of crossed muskets and the 1795 model Springfield Arsenal musket was adopted as the standard musket to be used. This was the first official United States shoulder arm, made in a government arsenal, caliber .69, flint lock, smooth bore, muzzle loader. The standardized musket now in use was first suggested by Major General Charles S. Farnsworth, U.S. Army, while he was the first Chief of Infantry, in July 1921, and approved by General Pershing, Chief of Staff, in 1922. The device adopted in 1922 has been in continual use since 1924. There have been slight modifications in the size of the insignia over the years; however, the basic design has remained unchanged.

=== Branch plaque ===
The plaque design has the branch insignia, letters and border in gold. The background is Saxony blue.

=== Regimental insignia ===
Personnel assigned to the Infantry branch affiliate with a specific regiment and wear the insignia of the affiliated regiment.

=== Regimental coat of arms ===
There is no standard infantry regimental flag to represent all of the infantry regiments. Each regiment of infantry has its own coat of arms which appears on the breast of a displayed eagle. The background of all the infantry regimental flags is flag blue with yellow fringe.

=== Branch colors ===
Saxony Blue – 65014 cloth; 67120 yarn; PMS 5415.

The Infantry has made two complete cycles between white and light blue. During the Revolutionary War, white facings were prescribed for the Infantry. White was the color used for Infantry until 1851 at which time light or Saxony blue was prescribed for the pompon and for the trimming on Infantry horse furniture. In 1857, the color was prescribed as sky blue. In 1886, the linings of capes and trouser stripes were prescribed to be white. However, in 1902, the light blue was prescribed again. In 1917, the cape was still lined with light blue but the Infantry trouser stripes were of white as were the chevrons for enlisted men. The infantry color is light blue; however, infantry regimental flags and guidons have been National Flag blue since 1835. White is used as a secondary color on the guidons for letters, numbers, and insignia.

=== Birthday ===
14 June 1775. The Infantry is the oldest branch in the Army. Ten companies of riflemen were authorized by the Continental Congress Resolve of 14 June 1775. However, the oldest Regular Army Infantry Regiment, the 3rd Infantry, was constituted on 3 June 1784 as the First American Regiment.

== Current active units ==
The United States Army Infantry School is currently at Fort Benning, Georgia.

- 1st Armored Division (9 combined arms battalions)
- 1st Cavalry Division (9 combined arms battalions)
- 1st Infantry Division (6 combined arms battalions)
- 2nd Infantry Division (6 Stryker infantry battalions)
- 3rd Infantry Division (7 combined arms battalions and 3 Army National Guard light infantry battalions)
- 4th Infantry Division (3 combined arms battalions and 6 Stryker infantry battalions)
- 7th Infantry Division (9 Stryker infantry battalions)
- 10th Mountain Division (9 light infantry battalions)
- 11th Airborne Division (3 light infantry battalions and 2 airborne infantry battalions)
- 25th Infantry Division (6 light infantry battalions {4 Regular, 1 Army National Guard, 1 Army Reserve})
- 82nd Airborne Division (9 airborne infantry battalions)
- 101st Airborne Division (9 air assault infantry battalions)
- 173rd Airborne Brigade Combat Team (3 airborne infantry battalions {2 Regular, 1 Army National Guard})
- 11th Armored Cavalry Regiment (2 combined arms battalions)
- 2nd Cavalry Regiment (3 Stryker infantry squadrons)
- 3rd Cavalry Regiment (3 Stryker infantry squadrons)
- 3rd Infantry Regiment (The Old Guard) (2 light infantry battalions)
- 75th Ranger Regiment (3 Ranger airborne infantry battalions)
- Special Forces (26 airborne special operations battalions {20 regular, 6 Army National Guard})

(*)Note: Combined arms battalions contain two mechanized infantry companies, along with two armor (tank) companies and a headquarters and headquarters company.

== Current types of U.S. Army Infantry ==
(Comparison with U.S. Marine Corps Infantry)

The US Army currently employs three types of infantry: light infantry (consisting of four sub-types), Stryker infantry, and mechanized infantry. The infantrymen themselves are essentially trained, organized, armed, and equipped the same, save for some having airborne, air assault, and/or Ranger qualification(s), the primary difference being in the organic vehicles (or lack thereof) assigned to the infantry unit, or the notional delivery method (e.g., parachute drop or heliborne) employed to place the infantryman on the battlefield. All modern US Army rifle platoons contain three nine-man rifle squads. Each type of infantry has a discrete TO&E.

Light and Ranger infantry have similar battalion organizations (i.e., an Headquarters and Headquarters Company (HHC) and three infantry companies), however there are significant differences in the composition of each of the two types of companies between the battalions. Airborne and Air Assault infantry battalions (sharing essentially the same battalion, company, and platoon organization), are significantly larger than the light and Ranger infantry battalions, because they contain an anti-armor company and have a larger HHC. Stryker and mechanized infantry units' TO&Es are markedly different from each other as well as from the several sub-types of light infantry. An obvious difference is the requirement to allow for additional manpower and equipment to man, maintain, and service their respective vehicles.

=== Light Infantry ===
Primarily foot-mobile, usually transported by motorized assets, capable of air assault operations.

- Light Infantry: Standard light infantry not otherwise designated or qualified as one of the other three subtypes. Organized into battalions consisting of a HHC and three rifle companies. Three light infantry battalions form the primary maneuver component of an Infantry Brigade Combat Team (Light).
- Airborne Infantry: Parachute qualified and capable of night, low-level parachute insertion when deployed by U.S. Air Force fixed-wing strategic or tactical transport aircraft or Army Aviation assets. Organized into battalions consisting of an HHC, three rifle companies, and an antiarmor company. Three airborne infantry battalions form the primary maneuver component of an Infantry Brigade Combat Team (Airborne).
- Air Assault Infantry: Assigned to units with associated Army Aviation elements, with both the infantry and aviation elements specifically trained and organized to perform the air assault mission, however all light infantry are capable of performing the air assault mission when transported by appropriate aviation assets. Organized into battalions consisting of an HHC, three rifle companies, and an antiarmor company. Three air assault infantry battalions form the primary maneuver component of an Infantry Brigade Combat Team (Air Assault).
- Ranger Infantry: Parachute qualified and specifically trained and designated for special operations missions as well as conventional light infantry tasks. Organized into battalions consisting of an HHC and three Ranger companies. The three Ranger infantry battalions form the primary maneuver component of the 75th Ranger Regiment.

=== Stryker Infantry ===
Equipped with M1126 Stryker Infantry Carrier Vehicles, "Stryker" infantry is essentially a new form of "medium infantry." While technically a form of mechanized infantry, because of their namesake wheeled mounts Stryker infantry is more heavily armored and weapon-equipped than light infantry, but not as robust in either category as mechanized infantry. Organized into battalions consisting of a headquarters and headquarters company and three Stryker infantry companies. Three infantry battalions form the primary maneuver component of a Stryker Brigade Combat Team. The SBCT combines the tactical mobility aspect of mechanized units while emphasizing and exploiting the infantry fight where decisive action occurs.” Similarly, it asserts that “the organic vehicles in the platoons are for moving infantry to the fight swiftly. The rifle platoon consisted of four ICVs with three dismounted squads. The dismounted squads were two rifle squads and one weapons squad (at the time manning was insufficient to fill the third authorized rifle squad). The rifle platoon retained the ability to simultaneously employ three command launch units.

=== Mechanized Infantry ===
Equipped with M2 Bradley Infantry Fighting Vehicle, they are trained, organized, and equipped to operate in conjunction with tanks, therefore, essentially forming the modern equivalent of "heavy" or "armored" infantry. (Both terms, historically eschewed by the U.S. Army Infantry Branch due to supposed pejorative or "Armor Branch," viz., "tank unit" biases.) Mechanized infantry is organized into "Combined Arms" battalions consisting of an HHC, and either two tank companies, and one mechanized infantry company, or two mechanized infantry companies and one tank company. Three Combined Arms Battalions form the primary maneuver component of an Armored Brigade Combat Team.

== The U.S. Army Infantryman's Creed ==
Infantryman's Creed

I am the Infantry.

I am my country's strength in war.
Her deterrent in peace.
I am the heart of the fight...
wherever, whenever.
I carry America's faith and honor
against her enemies.
I am the Queen of Battle.
I am what my country expects me to be...
the best trained soldier in the world.
In the race for victory
I am swift, determined, and courageous,
armed with a fierce will to win.
Never will I fail my country's trust.
Always I fight on...
through the foe,
to the objective,
to triumph over all,
If necessary, I will fight to my death.
By my steadfast courage,
I have won more than 200 years of freedom.
I yield not to weakness,
to hunger,
to cowardice,
to fatigue,
to superior odds,
for I am mentally tough, physically strong,
and morally straight.
I forsake not...
my country,
my mission,
my comrades,
my sacred duty.
I am relentless.
I am always there,
now and forever.
I AM THE INFANTRY!
FOLLOW ME!

== See also ==
- Infantry Shoulder Cord
- Combat Infantryman Badge
- U.S. Army branch insignia
- U.S. Army Infantry School
- List of United States War Department Forms - Lists US Army ordnance publications circa 1895–1920, links online versions, including many infantry weapons
- U.S. Marine Infantry
- U.S. Marine Corps Infantry
- U.S. Marine Corps School of Infantry

== Sources ==
- Historical register and dictionary of the United States Army, from ..., Volume 1 By Francis Bernard Heitman
- Official U. S. bulletin, Volume 1 By United States (1917). Committee on Public Information
- Encyclopedia of United States Army insignia and uniforms By William K. Emerson (page 51).
- Infantry Division Components of the US Army By Timothy Aumiller
- Rinaldi, Richard A. (2004). The U. S. Army in World War I: Orders of Battle. General Data LLC. ISBN 0-9720296-4-8.
