= 40th Infantry Brigade Combat Team =

- Shoulder sleeve insignia
- Active: 1917–1919; 1926–1974; 2005–2008
- Country: United States
- Branch: United States Army
- Type: Infantry
- Size: Brigade
- Garrison/HQ: San Diego, California (HQ)
- Nickname: Thunderbolt
- Motto: ARMIPOTENT (Mighty in Arms)
- Engagements: World War I; World War II; Korean War; Operation Iraqi Freedom
- Decorations: Philippine Presidential Unit Citation Republic of Korea Presidential Unit Citation

The 40th Infantry Brigade Combat Team was an infantry brigade of the United States Army National Guard in the state of California.

== Order of battle ==
- 1st Battalion 184th Infantry Regiment
- 1st Battalion 160th Infantry Regiment
- 1st Squadron 18th Cavalry Regiment
- 1st Battalion 143rd Field Artillery Regiment
- 40th Special Troops Battalion
- 40th Brigade Support Battalion

== Unit history ==
The 40th Infantry Brigade was originally made up of the 50th and 90th Infantry Regiments and served as part of the 20th Infantry Division from October 1918 to February 1919.

Based on the shoulder patch used by this unit, this unit must trace its lineage to that of the 40th Armored Brigade, who was authorized use of the same SSI on 2 February 1970. Constituted in July 1917 the brigade was organized and drafted into federal service in August 1917 at Camp Kearny and was demobilized in April 1919 at the same location. June 1926 found the unit being reconstituted in the California National Guard. The unit headquarters relocated a number of times until it was called into federal service in February 1942. After World War II the unit was inactivated in April 1946, but was called up again in September 1950 due to the Korean War. Having wintered over in Korea in 1951 and 1952 the unit was deactivated in July 1954.

On 29 January 1968, the 40th Infantry Division was deactivated and the 40th Infantry Brigade and 40th Armored Brigade were organized. On 13 January 1974, the California Army National Guard was reorganized. The 40th and 49th Infantry and the 40th Armored Brigades were deactivated and the 40th Infantry Division was reformed.

The 40th Infantry Brigade Combat Team (IBCT) was activated in 2005 as part of the reorganization of the California National Guard, which in turn was part of the restructuring of the total US Army. The Army is restructuring and moving from the division to the brigade as the primary building block of combat power. To this effect the 2nd and 3rd Brigades of the 40th Infantry Division of the California Army National Guard were merged into the 40th IBCT. As of February 2007, most of the brigade is stateside. However, individual soldiers are in Iraq working in other active duty units or are tasked for border security missions in southern California. The 40th Infantry Brigade Combat Team is organized under the Army's new modular brigade structure. The role of the brigade combat team is to act as the Army's basic tactical maneuver unit and the smallest combined-arms unit that can be committed independently. The brigade combat team is designed to conduct offensive, defensive, and stability operations. The core mission is to close with the enemy by means of fire and maneuver; to destroy or capture enemy forces; or to repel their attacks by fire, close combat, and counterattack. The brigade combat team can fight without augmentation, but it also can be tailored to meet the precise needs of its missions.

40th Infantry Brigade Combat Team also had a state mission. In times of emergency, the governor may call the National Guard to assist civil authorities. The self-contained and modular structure of the 40th Infantry Brigade Combat Team makes it well suited to provide this support.

On 1 September 2007, the brigade was again reformed after another reorganization of the 40th Infantry Division. However, on 1 September 2008 the brigade was redesignated the 79th Infantry Brigade Combat Team (United States).
