= Harry Foote Hodges =

United States Army general

Harry Hodges
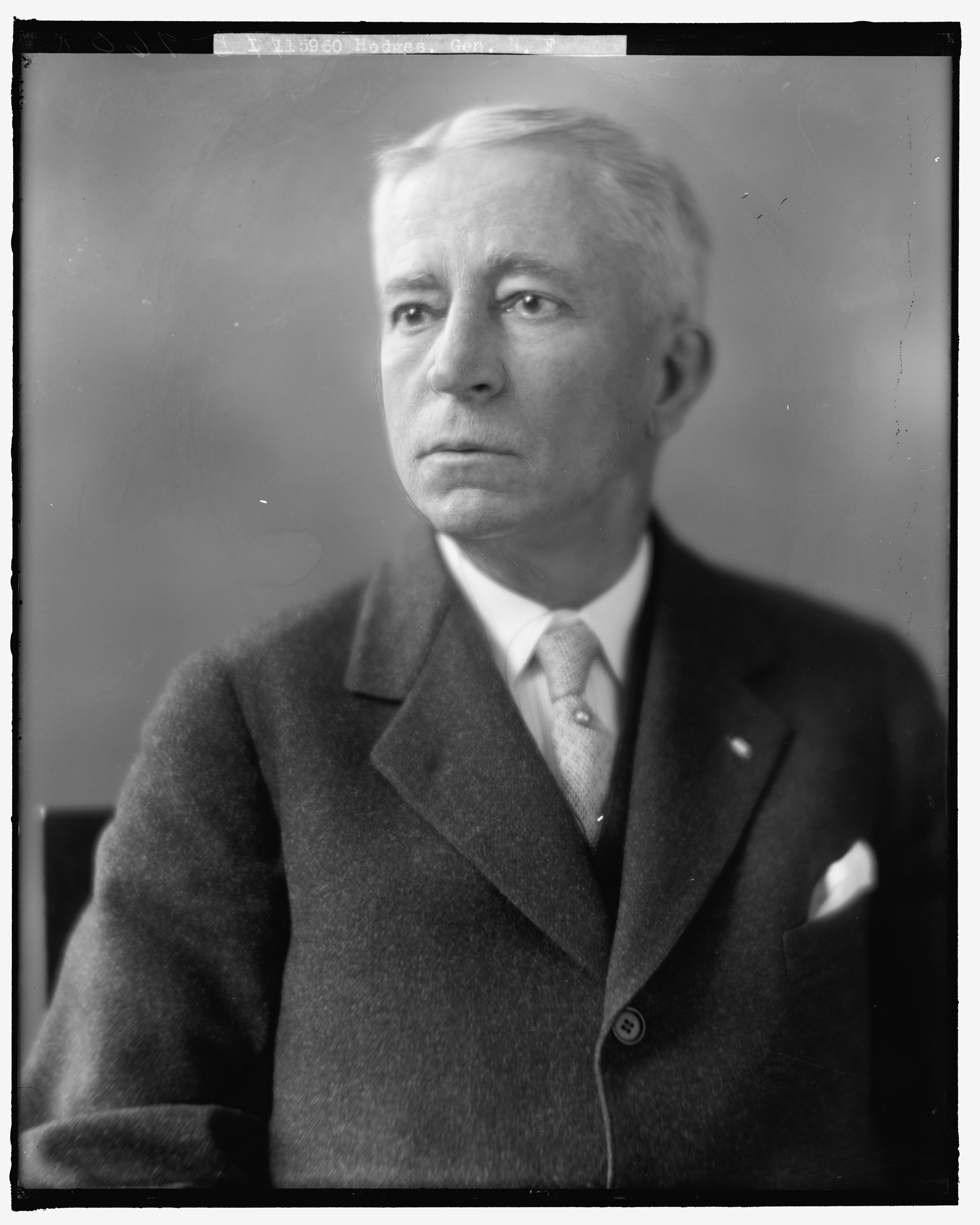
- Born: February 25, 1860; Boston, Massachusetts, US
- Died: September 24, 1929 (aged 69); Chicago, Illinois, US
- Burial place: Graceland Cemetery
- Spouse: Alma L'Hommedieu Raynolds (m. 1887)
- Children: 4
- Military career
- Allegiance: United States
- Branch: Corps of Engineers; United States Army
- Service years: 1881–1921
- Rank: Major General
- Service number: 0-39
- Conflicts: Spanish–American War; World War I
- Awards: Distinguished Service Medal

Harry Foote Hodges (February 25, 1860 – September 24, 1929) was a United States Army officer in the late 19th and early 20th centuries. He served in the Spanish–American War and World War I, and he received the Distinguished Service Medal.

== Biography ==
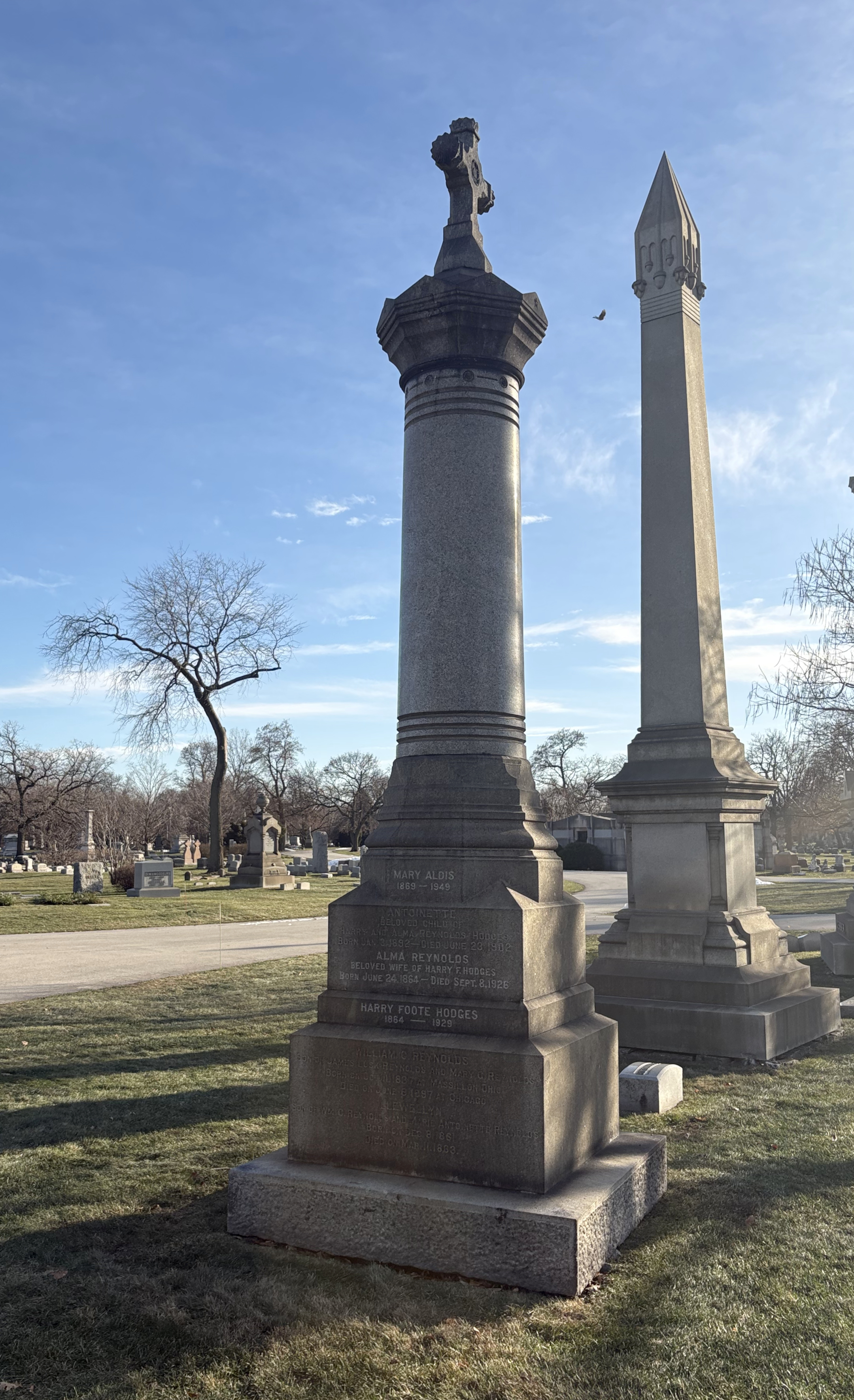
Hodges' grave at Graceland Cemetery

Hodges was born in Boston on February 25, 1860. He attended school at Boston Latin School and Adams Academy in Quincy, Massachusetts, and he graduated from the United States Military Academy in 1881.

Hodges was commissioned into the United States Army Corps of Engineers and served in various positions, including river and harbor duty and teaching at USMA. He was a lieutenant colonel of the First U.S. Volunteer Engineers starting on June 10, 1898, and he served in Puerto Rico during the Spanish–American War. Hodges served as Chief Engineer of the Department of Cuba from 1901 to 1902. He worked at the Office of the Chief of Engineers in Washington, D.C., from 1902 to 1907and he served as General Purchasing Officer, assistant chief engineer, and as a member of the Isthmian Canal Commission from 1907 to 1914. Hodges was in charge of the designing the dams, locks, and regulation works of the Panama Canal from 1914 to 1915, and he served as an engineer of maintenance. For his efforts, he received thanks from Congress, and he was promoted to the rank of brigadier general on March 4, 1915.

Hodges commanded the North and Middle Atlantic Coast Artillery Districts from 1915 to 1917, and he commanded the 76th Infantry Division at Camp Devens and in France from August 25, 1917, to January 1, 1919. He received the Army Distinguished Service Medal for this latter command. The citation for the medal reads:

The President of the United States of America, authorized by Act of Congress, July 9, 1918, takes pleasure in presenting the Army Distinguished Service Medal to Major General Harry Foote Hodges, United States Army, for exceptionally meritorious and distinguished services to the Government of the United States, in a duty of great responsibility during World War I. AS Commanding General, Camp Devens, Massachusetts, General Hodges displayed unusual administrative and executive ability, sound judgment, and high professional skill. He established a model system of schools and training, organized and trained the 76th Division, and in addition thereto trained for overseas service more than 40,000 men of other units. His untiring energy, devotion to duty, coupled with other outstanding soldierly qualities, contributed markedly to the successful operations of the American forces during the World War.

Hodges then commanded the 20th Division at Camp Sevier, South Carolina, and Camp Travis, Texas, from January 1 to July 1, 1919. From July 1, 1919, to December 21, 1921, he commanded the North Pacific and Third Coast Artillery Districts. Hodges was promoted to the rank of major general on December 21, 1921, and he retired the following day.

Hodges lived in retirement in Lake Forest, Illinois. He died in Chicago on September 24, 1929, and was buried at Graceland Cemetery.

== Personal life ==
Hodges married Alma L'Hommedieu Raynolds on December 8, 1887, and they had four children together. He was an Episcopalian.

== Legacy ==
The USS General H. F. Hodges (AP-144), a World War II Naval ship, was named after Hodges.

== Bibliography ==
- Davis, Henry Blaine Jr. (1998). Generals in Khaki. Raleigh, North Carolina: Pentland Press. ISBN 1571970886. OCLC 40298151.
- Marquis Who's Who (1975). Who Was Who In American History – The Military. Chicago, Illinois: Marquis Who's Who. ISBN 0837932017.
