= E. Leroy Sweetser =

U.S. Army brigadier general

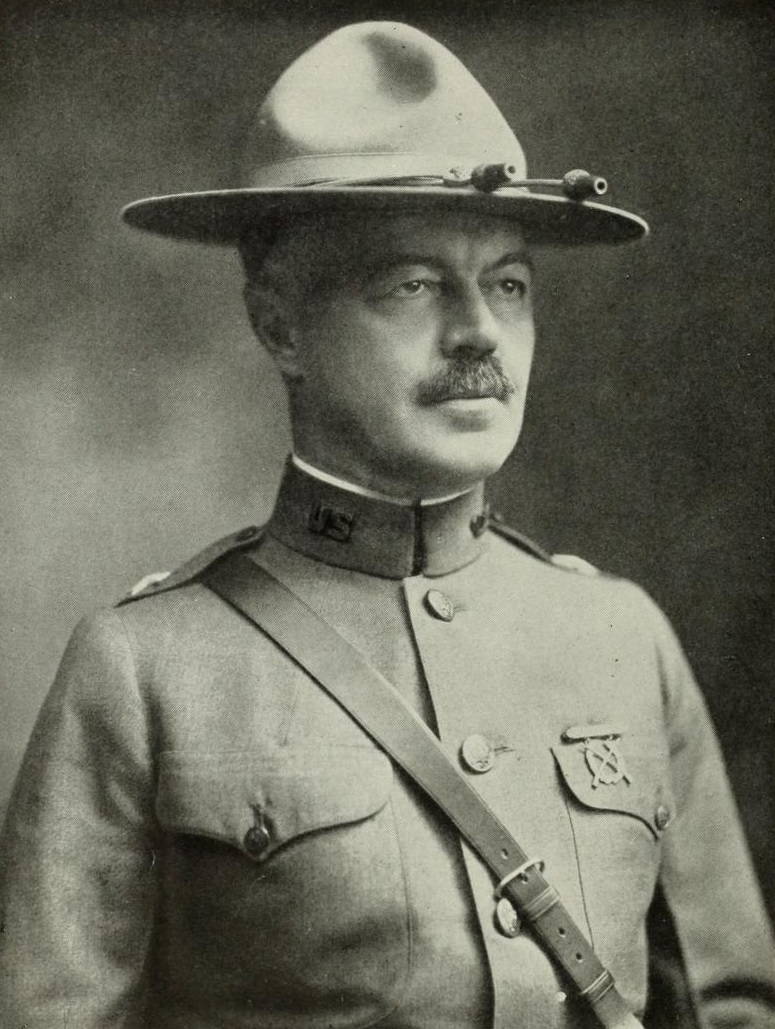
- From 1919's Welcome Home Souvenir Book In Honor of Everett's Soldiers and Sailors (Note: This photo and other contemporary photos verify that the photograph identified as Sweetser's in Generals In Khaki is of another individual.)
- Born: September 25, 1869; Medford, Massachusetts, U.S.
- Died: January 26, 1951 (aged 81) Everett, Massachusetts, U.S.
- Buried: Woodlawn Cemetery, Everett, Massachusetts, U.S.
- Service: United States Army; Massachusetts National Guard
- Service years: 1893–1919
- Rank: Brigadier General
- Commands: Company B, 8th Massachusetts Infantry Regiment; 2nd Battalion, 8th Massachusetts Infantry Regiment; 8th Massachusetts Infantry Regiment; 2nd Brigade, Massachusetts National Guard; Adjutant General of Massachusetts; 51st Depot Brigade; 2nd Brigade, Corps and Army Troops; 39th Infantry Brigade, 20th Division; 20th Division
- Wars: Spanish–American War; Pancho Villa Expedition; World War I
- Education: Boston University School of Law (LL.B., 1897)
- Spouse: Maud E. Pettengill (m. 1899–1951)
- Children: 1
- Other work: Attorney; Judge; Commissioner, Massachusetts Department of Labor and Industries

Elbridge Leroy Sweetser (September 25, 1869 – January 26, 1951) was a Massachusetts attorney, politician, judge, and military officer. An 1897 graduate of Boston University School of Law, he became a successful attorney in Everett. A Republican, Sweetser served as judge of the district court in Everett and Commissioner of the Massachusetts Department of Labor and Industries. He was a longtime member of the Massachusetts National Guard, and served as Adjutant General of Massachusetts during World War I.

A native of Medford, Massachusetts, Sweetser graduated from the Chauncy Hall School and Boston University School of Law, and practiced law in Everett, Massachusetts. A Republican, Sweetser served as an alderman and special justice of the Everett district court, and was the state's Commissioner of Labor and Industries from 1919 to 1931.

Sweetser served in the Massachusetts National Guard from 1893 to 1919, and advanced from private to brigadier general. After Spanish–American War service as an enlisted soldier, Sweetser received his commission and advanced through the ranks as commander of units including 8th Massachusetts Infantry Regiment and the Massachusetts National Guard's 2nd Brigade. He led his brigade on the Texas-Mexico border during the Pancho Villa Expedition, and served as Adjutant General of Massachusetts at the start of World War I. Sweetser commanded brigades during their wartime organization and training, and retired from the military at the end of the war.

In retirement, Sweetser continued to reside in Everett. He died in Everett on January 26, 1951. He was buried at Woodlawn Cemetery in Everett.

== Early life ==
E. Leroy Sweetser was born in Medford, Massachusetts on September 25, 1869, the son of Elbridge L. Sweetser and Hannah (Simson) Sweetser. (Note: Davis incorrectly gives Sweetser's name as "Eldridge". Contemporary records indicate that "Elbridge" was correct.) He attended the public schools of Everett, then graduated from the Chauncy Hall School. In 1897, Sweetser graduated from the Boston University School of Law with an LL.B. He was admitted to the bar in July, then started to practice in Everett.

== Civilian career ==
In addition to practicing law, Sweetser was involved in local politics and government. In December 1897, he was elected to Everett's board of aldermen. He was a founder of the Everett National Bank, and served as its president and a member of the board of directors.

In November 1919, he was appointed to a three-year term as Commissioner of the Massachusetts Department of Labor and Industries, and he served in this post until 1931. In 1926, he was elected a trustee of the Boston Five Cents Savings Bank. In addition, he was a director of the Charlestown Five Cents Savings Bank. Sweetser was a delegate to the 1928 Republican National Convention. In 1936, he was an unsuccessful candidate for the Republican nomination for a seat in the Massachusetts Senate.

Sweetser was a special justice of the district court in Everett for nearly 25 years. During World War II, he was chairman of one of Everett's local draft boards. He was active in civic and fraternal organizations including the Woodlawn Cemetery Corporation, Masons, Order of the Eastern Star, Elks, General Society of Colonial Wars, and Sons of Union Veterans.

== Military career ==
In March 1893, Sweetser enlisted in the Massachusetts Militia when he joined Company L, 5th Massachusetts Infantry Regiment. Between 1893 and 1898, he earned promotions to corporal and sergeant. In June 1898, he was advanced to first sergeant. In July 1898, his company was mustered into the United States Volunteers for the Spanish–American War as Company L, 5th Massachusetts Volunteer Infantry Regiment. The regiment organized and trained at Camp Dalton in Framingham until September, when it was assigned to Camp George Meade, Pennsylvania for additional training. In November, the regiment was posted to Camp Wetherill near Greenville, South Carolina.

In October 1898, Sweetser received his commission as a second lieutenant. When he received his appointment as an officer, Sweetser's friends in Everett presented him with a commemorative revolver, sword, and sword belt. After serving with Company E, 5th Infantry, Sweetser was appointed judge advocate of Second Army Corps. When army leaders determined that the need for volunteers had ended, 5th Massachusetts soldiers began to receive discharges, and the regiment was officially mustered out in March 1899.

Sweetser was promoted to captain in March 1900 and assigned to command Company B, 8th Massachusetts Infantry. In February 1905, he received advancement to major and was appointed to command the regiment's 2nd Battalion. In March 1908, Sweetser was promoted to colonel as commander of the 8th Massachusetts Infantry. In April 1908, he commanded National Guard forces that took part in the response to the Great Chelsea fire of 1908.

In March 1913, Sweetser received promotion to brigadier general and assignment as commander of the Massachusetts National Guard's 2nd Brigade. In June 1916, he was activated for federal service as commander of his brigade when it performed duty on the Texas-Mexico border during the Pancho Villa Expedition. From March to August 1917, Sweetser served as Adjutant General of Massachusetts. In August 1917, Sweetser was called to federal active duty for World War I as commander of the 51st Depot Brigade, a unit of the 26th Division, that was organized and trained at Camp Greene, North Carolina. The 51st Depot Brigade subsequently provided troops to fill out the 27th Division, and Sweetser was posted to Camp Wadsworth, South Carolina as commander of 2nd Brigade, Corps and Army Troops.

In September 1918, Sweetser was assigned to Camp Sevier in Taylors, South Carolina as commander of the 20th Division's 39th Infantry Brigade. In October 1918, he assumed command of the division. The Armistice of November 11, 1918 ended the war before the 20th Division's organization and training were complete, and it was inactivated at the end of the war. Following the end of the war. Sweetser received his discharge in February 1919 and returned to Massachusetts. He retired from the National Guard as a brigadier general, but remained active in military and veterans affairs.

After the war, Sweetser was an early member of the American Legion. In addition to commanding the post in Everett, he was a delegate to numerous state and national Legion conventions. Among Sweetser's other post-First World War activities was a term as president of the Massachusetts National Guard Association. In addition, he frequently took part in parades and other celebrations, often as a featured speechmaker. Sweetser was also a longtime member of the Veterans of Foreign Wars.

== Retirement and death ==
In retirement, Sweetser continued to reside in Everett, where he remained active in civic and veterans causes, including service as Everett's Director of Civil Defense. He died in Everett on January 26, 1951. Sweetser was buried at Woodlawn Cemetery in Everett.

== Family ==
In 1899, Sweetser married Maud E. Pettengill (1874–1970). They were the parents of a son, attorney Howard R. Sweetser.
