= 89th Infantry Regiment (United States) =

- Active: 1918-1919; 1941-1943
- Country: United States of America
- Branch: United States Army
- Type: Infantry
- Size: Regiment
- Garrison/HQ: Various
- Colors: Blue
- Engagements: World War II; American Theater

The 89th Infantry Regiment was an infantry regiment of the United States Army that was partially active during World War II.

== History ==
The 89th Infantry Regiment was constituted in the Regular Army on 31 August 1918 and organized in September 1918 at Camp Travis, Texas, as an element of the 20th Division. However, World War I ended before the unit could deploy overseas, and the 89th Infantry was demobilized from 27-29 March 1919 at Fort Oglethorpe, Georgia, and Camp Sevier, South Carolina.

The 89th Infantry was reconstituted on 22 May 1941 and activated piecemeal both stateside and overseas. Company A and Headquarters and Headquarters Company (HHC) 3rd Battalion were activated on 2 January 1941 at Fort Snelling, Minnesota. Companies I and L were activated on 1 June 1941 and 20 June 1941, respectively, in Bermuda. Company M was activated on 1 September 1941 at Fort Jackson, South Carolina. The elements of the regiment guarded various U.S. installations in Bermuda and the Caribbean before being inactivated beginning in 1943. The HHC, 3rd Battalion and Companies I, K, and M were inactivated on 21 October 1943 at Fort Benning, Georgia. On 15 November 1943, the regimental fund was transferred to the 131st Infantry Regiment at Fort Benning. Company A was inactivated on 19 November 1943 in the Antilles. Company L was inactivated on 30 July 1944 at Camp Pickett, Virginia. The regiment as awarded the American Theater campaign streamer without inscription for its service.
