= Chapel Hill – Chauncy Hall School =

Private school in Waltham, Massachusetts, US

Coordinates: 42.3881°N 71.2376°W

- CH-CH Seal
- Waltham, Massachusetts; United States

Information
- School type: Private, boarding
- Established: 1828 (198 years ago)
- Head of school: Joshua Bubar
- Staff: 64
- Grades: 8–12/PG
- Gender: Co-ed
- Enrollment: 200
- Average class size: 10
- Student to teacher ratio: 5:1
- Campus size: 42 acres (170,000 m^{2})
- Colors: Blue and white
- Mascot: The Chargers
- Accreditation: AISNE
- Website: www.chch.org

Chapel Hill – Chauncy Hall School (CH-CH) is an independent, college-preparatory day and boarding school for grades 8 through 12 located on a 42-acre (170,000 m^{2}) campus in Waltham, Massachusetts, United States, and founded in 1828. The school is accredited by the New England Association of Schools and Colleges.

== History ==
Chapel Hill – Chauncy Hall's history involves three schools: Chauncy Hall, Chapel Hill, and the Huntington School. Chapel Hill, a school for girls founded in 1860 in Waltham on the current campus, and Chauncy Hall, a Boston day school for boys founded in 1828, merged in 1971 to create Chapel Hill – Chauncy Hall.

To the merger, Chapel Hill brought its strength in the humanities and the arts, and Chauncy Hall brought its strength in the fields of science and math. In 1974, Chapel Hill – Chauncy Hall incorporated the Huntington School, a Boston school for boys founded in 1909.

Chapel Hill – Chauncy Hall has many long-standing traditions. Wilkins Hall and its free-standing spiral staircase are still in use today. At Head of School installations, the book of the school is passed from one head to the next. Charles Henry Sampson scholarships are annually awarded to qualified students. Sampson served as head of the Huntington School for 30 years before its 1974 incorporation into CH-CH. Additionally, the school continues to keep in contact with alumni of Chauncy Hall, Chapel Hill, and the Huntington School.

In 2011, Chapel Hill - Chauncy Hall was featured in a Bloomberg article about schools that exploit Chinese students by representing themselves as high-performing academic institutions, but are instead institutions with a heavy Special Education focus.

== Student population and diversity ==
CH-CH has approximately 200 students, with a 45% boarding population and 55% day, and a 25% international student population.

== Course requirements ==
Course requirements at CH-CH consist of four years of English, four years of mathematics (through calculus), three years of history (including U.S. history), three years of laboratory science, two sequential years of a world language, and two years of visual or performing arts. CH-CH also offers honors, advanced, or AP courses in all of the major academic disciplines for students looking to advance their studies.

Spring Session: Each spring, CH-CH students and faculty participate in “Spring Sessions” — an experiential learning program offering a wide variety of off- and on-campus experiences, from marine biology field trips in the Florida Keys to community service projects. The program is designed and led by CH-CH faculty.

Senior Capstone: All seniors complete a composition in English, a research project in either history or science, and give a presentation to the school to graduate. Each senior is also required to complete 19 hours of community service.

Distinguished Scholar Program: CH-CH offers a Distinguished Scholar Program for students who wish to pursue an in-depth course of study in one of three tracks: Mathematics and Science, Visual Arts, or the Humanities. Students in the program work with faculty mentors in a personalized exploration of their chosen field, combining coursework with enriching external experiences. The program culminates in a distinguished diploma designation in the student’s area of study. Through the program, students develop core transferable skills including creativity, critical thinking and analysis, collaboration, and effective communication.

Senior Presentation: In order to graduate, seniors are required to make a presentation on any desired topic.

== Multiple Intelligences Approach ==
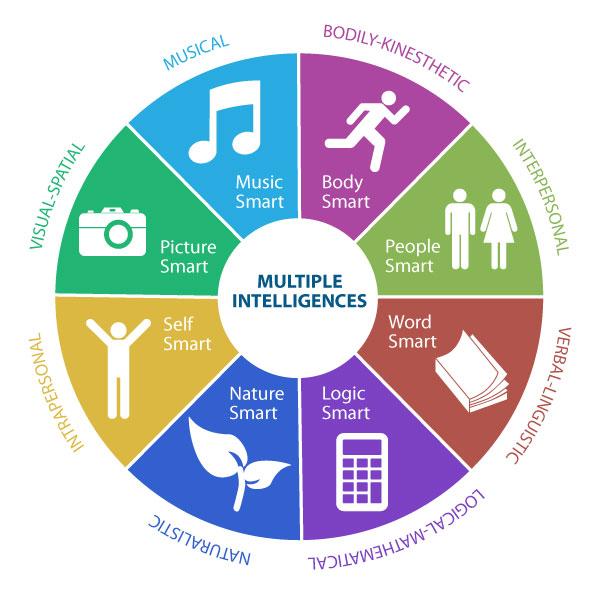
Multiple-intelligences

Classes are influenced by Dr. Howard Gardner of Harvard University, who developed the Theory of Multiple Intelligences. Dr. Gardner proposes that there are nine "intelligences" that schools need to support: interpersonal, intrapersonal, existential, mathematical/logical, kinesthetic, linguistic, naturalist, musical, and spatial. Teachers incorporate these intelligences into their curriculum.

On October 17, 2013, Howard Gardner visited the CH-CH campus. According to Dr. Gardner, "when something is important, try to teach it lots of different ways... Textbooks are fine, but not everybody learns best from textbooks. iPads, hands-on, works of art, debate, humor, graphics, and video, the more different ways you can teach something, the more likely it is to get in there, stay in there, and be useful."

== Main campus facilities ==
Harrington Hall: Named in honor of Louisa C. Harrington, 2011. Today it consists of the dining hall and Clements room downstairs and the freshmen and sophomore girls’ dormitory upstairs.

Cottage: The home of the Skills and Academic Strategies Department (SAS).

The CH-CH Commons: After serving the Waltham community for 150 years, the Covenant Congregational Church closed in 2010. In late 2011, the space was purchased by Chapel Hill-Chauncy Hall and connected with the rest of the campus. Each section was renovated and repurposed before reopening in 2012 as The CH-CH Commons. Performing arts, foreign language classes, and all school assemblies continue to be held here today. The CH-CH Commons is also home to the school's library and ‘MakerSpace.’ The CH-CH MakerSpace is a place for students to experiment, create, and explore hands-on alternatives to traditional classroom learning, using new technology like 3D modeling and printing, as well as established methods like sewing and basic woodworking. Students in the co-curricular MakerSpace activity investigate varied, self-directed topics, like basic coding, robotics, and prototyping, while academic classes are supported and enhanced by MakerSpace activities that introduce ‘design thinking’—iterative, progressive exploration of course material that encourages experimentation, collaboration, and a focus on process instead of results.

Wilkins Hall: Built in 1864, Wilkins remains the main academic building for upperclassmen history, English, history, science, and math classes.

Worcester Hall: Originally built in 1963 as a girls' dormitory, Worcester Hall is now the boys' dormitory and includes a wrestling facility.

South Hall: A gift from Arthur Astor Carey of the Astor family in 1903, South Hall is now the upperclassmen girls' dormitory.

Peebles Hall: The admissions office

Beaver Gymnasium & Machen Center: Built in 1981 in honor of Claude F. Machen '27. Today it houses the gym, workout room, and nurse's office.

Barn & Theater: Houses arts spaces including the theater, digital arts lab, makerspace studio, photography dark room, pottery studio, and dance/yoga studio. On Wednesday, August 29, Chapel Hill – Chauncy Hall School broke ground on their $5.5 million for their historic building, the visual and performing arts, the Barn renovation. The School added 9,000 square feet (840 m^{2}), including a new theater, new music classroom space, expanded state-of-the-art studio spaces, and a glass atrium gallery, creating a 22,000-square-foot (2,000 m^{2}) center for the arts. The Barn was renovated in the fall of 2019.

The Landry Center: In May 2025, Chapel Hill–Chauncy Hall opened The Landry Center, the school’s newest academic building, completing the largest capital campaign in its 197-year history. The building replaced the former Atwood building. The state-of-the-art facility features modern classroom spaces, a science room, faculty workspaces, and indoor and outdoor gathering areas. It is CH-CH’s first solar-powered building. The project was funded through a leadership gift from the Landry Family Foundation and contributions from over 120 donors to the “Growing Minds, Growing Community” campaign.

== Co-curricular activities ==
Students are required to participate in the afternoon co-curricular program each trimester.

CH-CH participates in the Massachusetts Bay Independent League (MBIL) for boys' soccer, cross country, basketball, baseball, and lacrosse. The school is also a member of the Independent Girls' Conference (IGC) for soccer, basketball, softball and lacrosse and the Eastern Independent League (EIL) for boys' wrestling.

== Notable alumni ==
- Alice Stone Blackwell
- Ida Smoot Dusenberry
- Curtis Guild Jr. – Guild was educated at Chauncy Hall and then attended Harvard University. At both schools, he was involved in military organizations, and he became a lieutenant in Harvard's rifle corps in 1879. In 1906, he became the 43rd Governor of Massachusetts, serving until 1909.
- C. M. S. McLellan
- Benjamin F. Nutting
- Josiah Porter, Adjutant General of New York
- James Sturgis Pray
- Edward Everett Rose
- E. Leroy Sweetser – U.S. Army brigadier general
- Marion Talbot
- Abbott Handerson Thayer
- Lucy Wheelock – enrolled in the Chauncy Hall School to prepare for college in 1876, but her discovery of the school's kindergarten altered her plans. After graduating, she became a kindergarten teacher at Chauncy Hall. In 1888, Wheelock instituted a one-year training course for teachers of the school. By 1896, Wheelock left the school to form the independent Wheelock Kindergarten Training School. Several decades later, Wheelock College was founded to honor her efforts. In 2018, Wheelock College merged with Boston University, and its programs are now offered through Boston University’s Wheelock College of Education & Human Development.

== Camps ==
Chapel Hill – Chauncy Hall School is the host of Running Brook Camps for youth and teens between the ages of 3.5 and 18.
