= USS General H. F. Hodges =

Former American navy ship

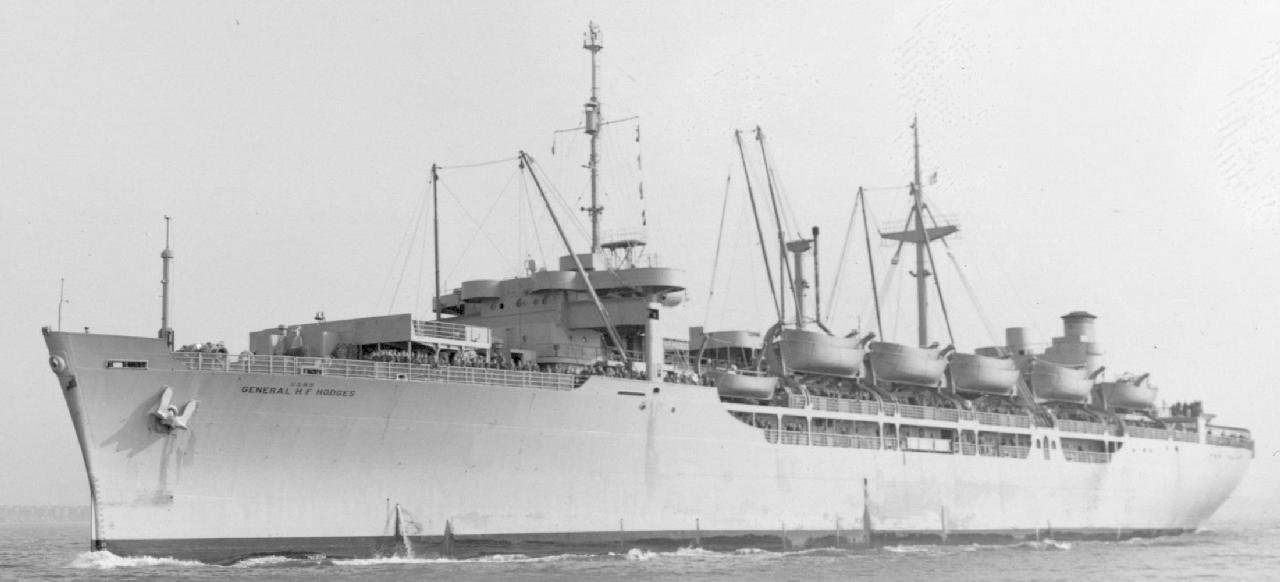
- USNS General H. F. Hodges (T-AP-144)

History

United States
- Name: General H. F. Hodges
- Namesake: Harry Foote Hodges
- Builder: Kaiser Co., Inc.; Richmond, California
- Laid down: date unknown
- Launched: 3 January 1945
- Acquired: 6 April 1945
- Commissioned: 6 April 1945
- Decommissioned: 13 May 1946
- In service: after 13 May 1946 (Army); 1 March 1950 (MSTS)Transported troops from Japan to US in March 1947
- Out of service: 1 March 1950 (Army); 16 June 1958 (MSTS)
- Renamed: SS James
- Reclassified: T-AP-144, 1 March 1950
- Identification: IMO number: 6903175
- Fate: Scrapped 1979

General characteristics
- Class & type: General G. O. Squier-class transport ship
- Displacement: 9,950 tons (light), 17,250 tons (full)
- Length: 522 ft 10 in (159.36 m)
- Beam: 71 ft 6 in (21.79 m)
- Draft: 24 ft (7.32 m)
- Propulsion: single-screw steam turbine with 9,900 shp (7,400 kW)
- Speed: 17 knots (31 km/h)
- Capacity: 3,823 troops
- Complement: 356 (officers and enlisted)
- Armament: 4 × 5"/38 caliber gun mounts; 4 × 40 mm AA gun mounts; 16 × 20 mm AA gun mounts

USS General H. F. Hodges (AP-144) was a General G. O. Squier-class transport ship for the U.S. Navy in World War II. The ship was crewed by the U.S. Coast Guard until decommissioning. She was named in honor of U.S. Army general Harry Foote Hodges. She was transferred to the U.S. Army as USAT General H. F. Hodges in 1946. On 1 March 1950 she was transferred to the Military Sea Transportation Service (MSTS) as USNS General H. F. Hodges (T-AP-144). She was later sold for commercial operation under the name SS James, before being scrapped in 1979.

== Operational history ==
General H. F. Hodges (AP-144) was launched 3 January 1945 under Maritime Commission contract (MC #711) by Kaiser Co., Inc., Yard 3, Richmond, California; sponsored by Mrs. Hodges Dickson; acquired by the Navy and commissioned 6 April 1945.

After shakedown training, General H. F. Hodges sailed from San Francisco 10 May 1945 with over 3,000 troops and a contingent of Army nurses. In the ensuing two months, she steamed to Hollandia, Manila, Leyte, and Biak in support of the accelerating push toward Japan before returning to San Francisco on Independence Day 1945. The transport departed 8 July for New York via the Panama Canal; and, after stopping there briefly, departed 5 August for Naples on a troop rotation voyage. While at sea she received word of the Japanese capitulation.

She returned to Boston 31 August with passengers from Naples. General H. F. Hodges then made two long voyages through the Suez Canal to India bringing home American troops, ending the second cruise when she reached New York Christmas Eve. The transport departed New York 31 January 1946 for Ceylon and India, continuing by way of the Pacific Islands to the United States, arriving 28 March 1946. She remained at Seattle until decommissioned 13 May 1946 and was returned to the Maritime Commission for transfer to the Army Transport Service. She was used to transport troops from Japan to the US by way of Korea in March 1947.

Reacquired by the Navy 1 March 1950, General H. F. Hodges was assigned to the MSTS under a civil service crew. In the years that followed, the ship sailed between New York and Latin American and European ports, as a passenger ship and supporting American ground units helping to deter Communist aggression in Europe, and transporting refugees from Bremerhaven to New York. From 22 to 28 March 1950, the ship left Cristobal, Canal Zone in the Republic of Panama and arrived in New York carrying passengers immigrating to the United States. She carried troops, their dependents, and supplies to most of the ports in northern Europe and the Mediterranean. In 1958, the versatile ship took time out from her busy schedule of voyages to participate in a giant amphibious exercise on the North Carolina coast, demonstrating the ease with which MSTS ships could be integrated into regular navy combat operations when and where the need arises. After two more passages to Europe, General H. F. Hodges was returned to the Maritime Administration 16 June 1958, and was placed in the National Defense Reserve Fleet, Hudson River, New York.

The transport was sold in 1967 to James River Transport, Inc. of New York who had Todd Shipyard, Brooklyn rebuild her to SS James, a 10,530-ton cargo ship. James entered commercial service in February 1968 and was scrapped at Taiwan in 1979.
