= 20th Division (United States) =

U.S. Army division active during World War I

20th Infantry Division
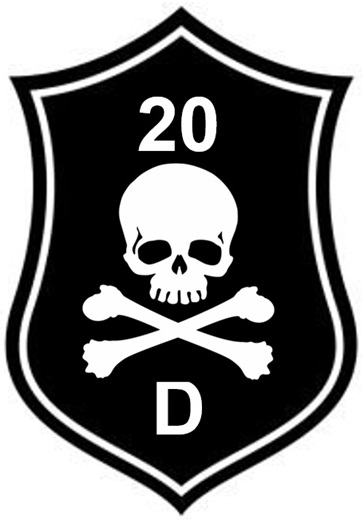
- Reproduction of unofficial shoulder sleeve insignia adopted by the 20th Division in 1918
- Active: 31 July 1918–28 February 1919
- Country: United States
- Branch: United States Army
- Type: Infantry
- Size: Division
- Garrison/HQ: Camp Sevier, South Carolina

Commanders
- Notable commanders: Louis J. Van Schaick; E. Leroy Sweetser; Harry Foote Hodges

There have been two 20th Divisions in the history of the United States Army.

In early 1917, the 20th Division was established as a National Guard formation consisting of units of the Idaho, Montana, Oregon, Washington, and Wyoming Army National Guards. On 1 April 1917, this division was renamed and activated for federal service as the 41st Division.

In August 1918, fourteen months after the American entry into World War I, another 20th Division was organized. This was a Regular Army and National Army division intended for service in World War I. The Armistice of November 11, 1918 ended the war before the 20th Division departed for France, and it was demobilized in February 1919.

The 20th Division's cantonment was Camp Sevier, South Carolina. The division's composition included a headquarters, headquarters troop, the 39th Infantry Brigade (48th and 89th Infantry Regiments) and the 40th Infantry Brigade (50th, 90th Infantry Regiments), the 58th, 59th, and 60th Machine Gun Battalions, the 20th Field Artillery Brigade (58th, 59th, and 60th Field Artillery Regiments and 20th Trench Mortar Battery), the 220th Engineer Regiment, the 220th Field Signal Battalion, and the 220th Train Headquarters and Military Police (Ammunition, Engineer, Sanitary, and Supply Trains).

== Commanders ==
Commanders of the 20th Division included:

1918

- Aug. 12: Col. Louis J. Van Schaick (ad interim)
- Aug. 18: Col. Lawrence B. Simonds (ad interim)
- Aug. 27: Col. William F. Grote (ad interim)
- Sept. 30: Brig. Gen E. Leroy Sweetser

1919

- Jan. 3: Maj. Gen. Harry F. Hodges
- Jan. 26: Brig. Gen E. Leroy Sweetser (ad interim)
- Feb. 6: Col. Louis J. Van Schaick (ad interim)
- Feb. 13: Maj. Gen. Harry F. Hodges
- Feb. 20: Col. Louis J. Van Schaick (ad interim)
- Feb. 22 to Feb. 28: Maj. Gen. Harry F. Hodges

== See also ==
- 20th Armored Division
- Divisions of the United States Army
