= 90th Infantry Regiment (United States) =

- Active: 1918–1919; 1943–1945
- Country: United States
- Branch: United States Army
- Type: Infantry

The 90th Infantry Regiment was a Regular Army infantry regiment of the United States Army, which existed during World War I and World War II.

The regiment was organized in 1918 during World War I with the 20th Division, but the war ended before it could be deployed overseas; it was demobilized in spring 1919.

During World War II, the 90th Infantry was again activated with the 10th Light Division (the future 10th Mountain) in mid-1943, but was transferred to become a nondivisional separate training unit in early 1944, inactivating in mid-1945.

== World War I ==
The 90th Infantry was constituted on 31 August 1918. It was organized during August and September at Camp Sevier, South Carolina, based on a cadre from the 50th Infantry Regiment, assigned to the 40th Infantry Brigade of the 20th Division. The regiment was initially commanded by Medal of Honor recipient Colonel Louis J. Van Schaick, who was replaced by Colonel Henry L. Wagner in early September after the former transferred to command the division trains. After the Armistice ended the war, the three battalions of the regiment were split in December, with one battalion moving to Camp Wadsworth, a second to Camp Hancock, and a third to Camp Greene, where they were demobilized between 13 and 22 March 1919.

== World War II ==
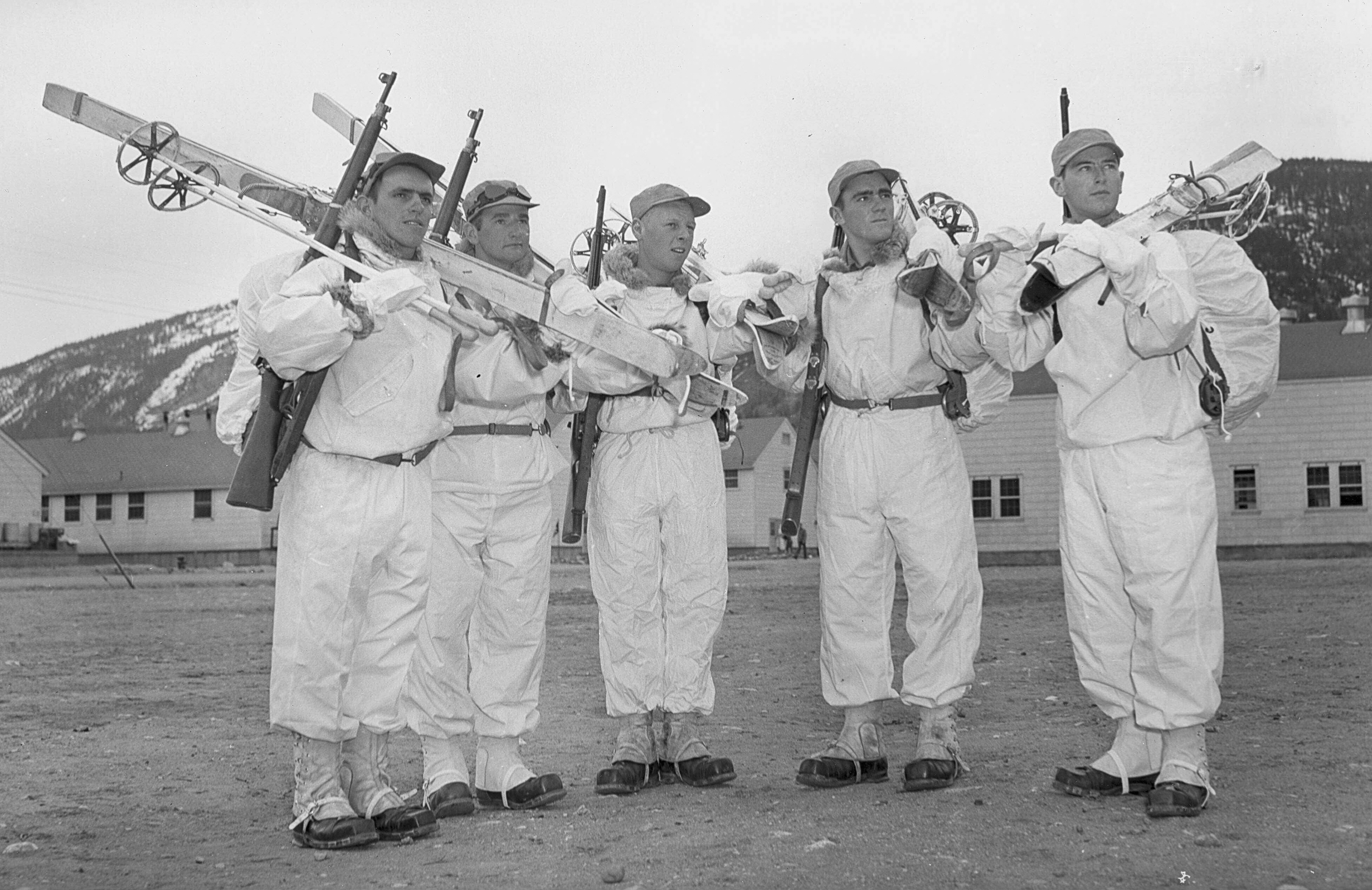
Members of the 10th Light Division preparing for ski training at Camp Hale, c. 1943

Following the Attack on Pearl Harbor, which resulted in the United States entry into World War II, the regiment was reconstituted on 10 July 1943, and activated five days later at Camp Hale, Colorado with the 10th Light Division (Alpine), using a cadre from the 105th, 106th, and 165th Infantry Regiments of the 27th Infantry Division, then in Hawaii. These men were reinforced by skiers and mountain climbers from the 86th Infantry Regiment, and the regiment conducted ski and mountain warfare training for the next several months. It was successively commanded by Colonels James E. Lewis and Paul R. Goode.

It was relieved from its assignment to the 10th on 13 (according to the 1953 Department of the Army publication The Army Lineage Book) or 22 February 1944 (according to historian Shelby Stanton in 1984), and transferred to XVI Corps at Camp Carson as a separate unit. Most of the regiment's skiers from Camp Hale were used to reinforce the other regiments and units of the division before the transfer, and the 90th itself was replaced in the division by the 87th Infantry Regiment. The 87th Infantry, one of the Army's other mountain regiments, had previously conducted operations in the Territory of Alaska during the Aleutian Islands campaign in mid-1943, and was returned to the United States via Canada in December 1943.

At Camp Carson, the 611-man cadre of the 90th Infantry Regiment provided an accelerated six-week course of infantry training (four weeks of familiarization, qualification, and transition firing, and two weeks of tactical training) to 2,900 men, who were formerly members of disbanded anti-aircraft and tank destroyer units or who had volunteered for transfer to the infantry from other branches of the Army, under the command of Colonel James E. Graham. Graham was replaced by Colonel Winfield R. McKay on 26 August. After XVI Corps was sent to Europe, the 90th was assigned to XXXVI Corps on 17 July before it moved to Camp Gruber, Oklahoma on 1 December. There, the regiment joined the Replacement and School Command on 9 February 1945, relocating to Camp Rucker, Alabama, on 17 February, where it inactivated on 10 August after training replacements for the remainder of the war.

The regiment published a newspaper, titled The 90th Infantryman, beginning at Camp Carson. The 90th Infantry was never authorized a distinctive unit insignia or coat of arms.
