= 48th Infantry Regiment (United States) =

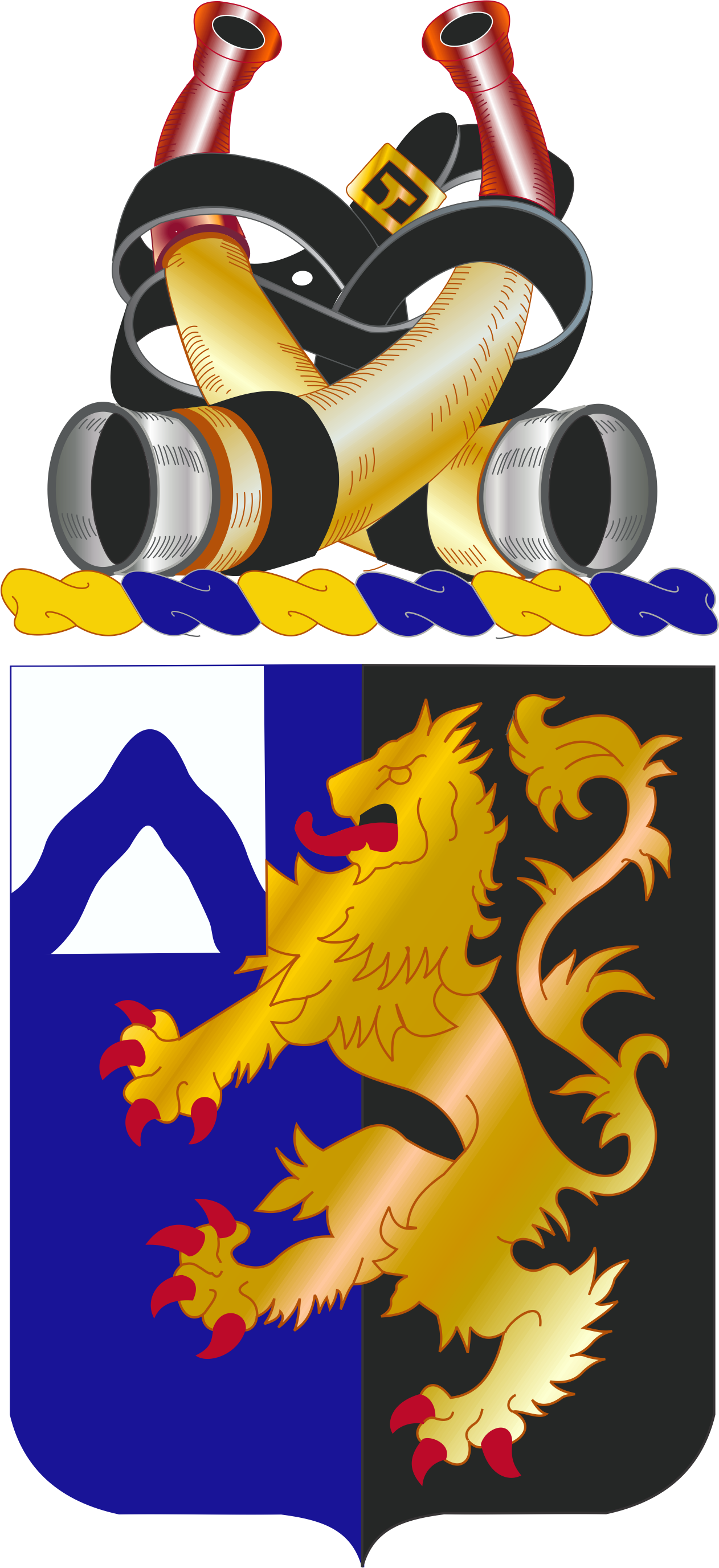
- Coat of Arms
- Active: 1917-present
- Country: United States
- Branch: United States Army
- Type: Infantry
- Size: Regiment
- Garrison/HQ: Fort Leonard Wood, Missouri
- Nickname: Dragoons
- Mottos: By Force and Valor

Commanders
- Current commander: LTC John Romito

Insignia
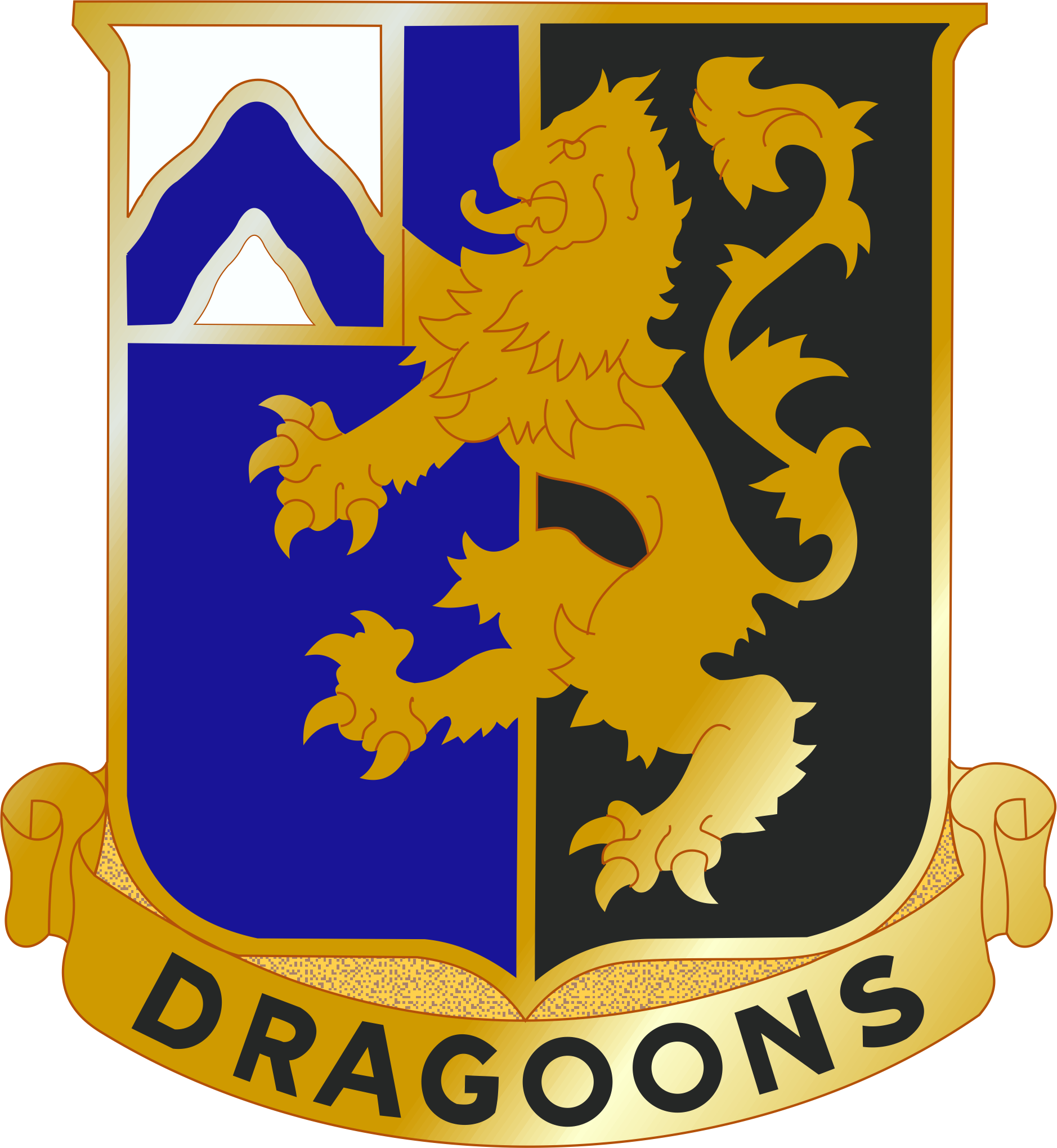
- Distinctive unit insignia

The 48th Infantry Regiment is an infantry regiment in the United States Army first formed in 1917.

== History ==
=== World War I and interwar period ===
The 48th Infantry Regiment was constituted on 15 May 1917 in the Regular Army, and organized on 1 June 1917 at Syracuse, New York. It was assigned on 31 July 1918 to the 20th Division, but the Armistice of 11 November 1918 ended the war before the division could deploy overseas and it was demobilized on 28 February 1919. The 48th Infantry Regiment was concurrently relieved from the 20th Division, and was stationed at Camp Jackson, South Carolina, as of June 1919 as a separate regiment. It was transferred in 1920 to Camp Harry J. Jones, Arizona, and concurrently, the 1st Battalion was transferred to El Paso, Texas. The entire regiment was transferred in September 1921 to Camp Travis, San Antonio, Texas, and was inactivated there on 14 October 1921 with personnel transferred to units of the 2nd Division. The regiment was demobilized and removed from the troop list on 31 July 1922.

=== Cold War ===
The 23rd, 38th, and 48th Armored Infantry Battalions were relieved on 15 February 1957 from assignment to the 7th Armored Division and were consolidated to form the 48th Infantry, a parent regiment under the United States Army Combat Arms Regimental System.

The 1st and 2nd Battalions of the 48th Infantry were mechanized infantry units assigned to the 3rd Armored Division (United States) (3AD) in West Germany during the Cold War. The battalions had overlapping assignments in the 3AD within the time frame 1957 to 1983 (joining the 2d of the 48th, the 1st of the 48th relocated to the 3AD at Gelnhausen in 1963 as part of the ROAD reorganization, from a prior assignment to 7th Army at Worms, Germany. In the 1963 ROAD reorganization 3d Armored Division Combat Command B at Gelnhausen was redesignated as the Second Brigade). 2lt Colin Powell served in 2nd Bn 48th at Gelnhausen c. 1959. James S. Voss served as a platoon leader, intelligence officer, and C company commander from 1975 to 1978. Following the 1963 ROAD reorganization, and along with the 1st Battalion, 33rd Armor Regiment (United States) which had been at Gelnhausen since the Spring of 1956, they comprised (1963 to 1983) the maneuver elements of the Division's 2d Brigade, stationed at Coleman Kaserne, in the city of Gelnhausen, Federal Republic of Germany. The Battalions served as part of NATO forces guarding the Inner-German Border against the Warsaw Pact. The unit crest of the 48th Infantry designated the unit as Dragoons. They are descended from National Guard units which trained for the First World War, and armored infantry battalions which served with the U.S. 7th Armored Division during World War II. The 48th Armored Infantry Battalion, along with 1st Battalion, 40th Armor, in particular, fought a tough battle in Vielsalm, Belgium, holding off the German V Panzer Corps for three days at the crossing of the Salm River, during the German Ardennes Offensive (also known as Battle of the Bulge).

The 2d Battalion, 48th Infantry was inactivated at Gelnhausen on 15 October 1991 (and approximately two years later the 3d Bn, 33d Armor from 3d Armored Division's 1st Brigade at Kirch Goens was transferred to Gelnhausen and took up some of the vacated space). On 16 June 1989 the 1st Battalion, 48th Infantry was inactivated at Gelnhausen and its personnel were re-designated and continued there as 4th Battalion, 18th Infantry Regiment.

On June 16, 2017, the 48th Infantry's 2nd Battalion was reactivated in a ceremony at Fort Leonard Wood, Missouri, joining the 15 April 2017 reactivated 48th Infantry's 1st Battalion, to train Basic Combat Training. The reactivated 48th Infantry's 2nd Battalion initially consisted solely of United States Army Reserves Drill Sergeants.

== Lineage ==
Constituted 15 May 1917 in the Regular Army as the 48th Infantry

Organized 1 June 1917 at Syracuse, New York

Assigned 31 July 1918 to the 20th Infantry Division (United States)

Relieved 28 February 1919 from assignment to the 20th Division

Inactivated 14 October 1921 at Camp Travis, Texas

Demobilized 31 July 1922

Reconstituted 27 February 1942 in the Regular Army as the 48th Armored Infantry and assigned to the 7th Armored Division (United States)

Activated 2 March 1942 at Camp Polk, Louisiana

Regiment broken up 20 September 1943 and its elements reorganized and redesignated as elements of the 7th Armored Division as follows:

- 48th Armored Infantry (less 1st and 2d Battalions) as the 48th Armored Infantry Battalion
  - 1st Battalion as the 38th Armored Infantry Battalion
  - 2d Battalion as the 23d Armored Infantry Battalion

After 20 September 1943 the above units underwent changes as follows:

- 48th Armored Infantry Battalion inactivated 8 October 1945 at Camp Myles Standish, Massachusetts
  - Activated 24 November 1950 at Camp Roberts, California
  - Inactivated 15 November 1953 at Camp Roberts, California
- 38th Armored Infantry Battalion inactivated 11 October 1945 at Camp Shanks, New York
  - Activated 24 November 1950 at Camp Roberts, California
  - Inactivated 15 November 1953 at Camp Roberts, California
- 23d Armored Infantry Battalion inactivated 11 October 1945 at Camp Kilmer, New Jersey
  - Activated 24 November 1950 at Camp Roberts, California
  - Inactivated 15 November 1953 at Camp Roberts, California

48th, 38th, and 23d Armored Infantry Battalions relieved 15 February 1957 from assignment to the 7th Armored Division and consolidated to form the 48th Infantry, a parent regiment under the Combat Arms Regimental System

Withdrawn 16 June 1989 from the Combat Arms Regimental System, reorganized under the United States Army Regimental System, and transferred to the United States Army Training and Doctrine Command

== Distinctive unit insignia ==
- Description

A Gold color metal and enamel device 1 1/8 inches (2.9 cm) in height consisting of a shield blazoned: Per pale Azure and Sable a lion rampant Or, on a canton Argent a chevron wavy of the first. Attached below the shield a Gold scroll inscribed "DRAGOONS" in Black letters.

- Symbolism

The colors blue and white are used for Infantry. Black and gold are the colors of the Belgian coat of arms from which the Belgian lion is adapted. The wavy chevron on the canton is for descent from the 9th Infantry. The Belgian lion represents the organization's action at Ardennes and St. Vith, for which it was awarded two unit decorations by the Belgian government.

- Background

The distinctive unit insignia was approved on 14 October 1958.

== Coat of arms ==
- Blazon
  - Shield- Per pale Azure and Sable a lion rampant Or, on a canton Argent a chevron wavy of the first.
  - Crest- On a wreath Or and Azure two hunting horns in saltire Or, inserts Argent, mouthpieces Gules and straps interlaced Sable buckled of the first. Motto: DRAGOONS.
- Symbolism
  - Shield- The colors blue and white are used for Infantry. Black and gold are the colors of the Belgian coat of arms from which the Belgian lion is adapted. The wavy chevron on the canton is for descent from the 9th Infantry. The Belgian lion represents the organization's action at Ardennes and St. Vith, for which it was awarded two unit decorations by the Belgian government.
  - Crest- The crest, consisting of Teutonic hunting horns, alludes to the German battle honors of World War II.
- Background- The coat of arms was originally approved for the 48th Infantry Regiment on 3 February 1921. It was redesignated for the 48th Armored Infantry Regiment on 19 May 1942. The insignia was redesignated for the 48th Armored Infantry Battalion on 30 November 1943. It was redesignated for the 48th Infantry Regiment and amended by the addition of a charge to and modification of the shield and a crest on 14 October 1958.

== Campaign credit ==
World War II

- Northern France
- Rhineland
- Ardennes-Alsace
- Central Europe

== Decorations ==
- Presidential Unit Citation (Army) for ST. VITH
- Belgian Fourragere 1940
  - Cited in the Order of the Day of the Belgian Army for action in the ARDENNES
  - Cited in the Order of the Day of the Belgian Army for action at ST. VITH

== See also ==
- U.S. Army Regimental System
- 48th New York Infantry Regiment Civil War Regiment also formed in New York.
