= 86th Infantry Regiment (United States) =

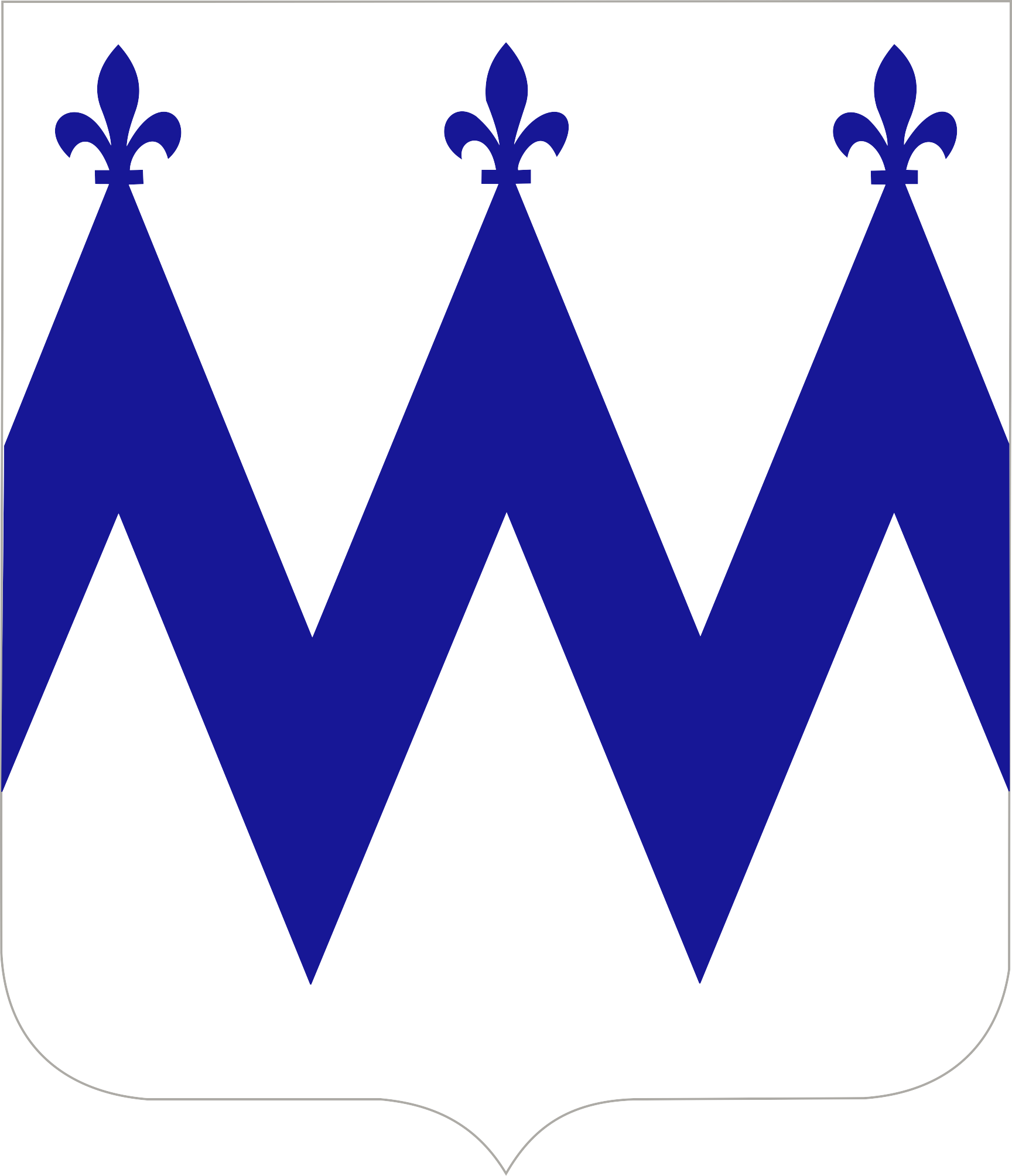
- Coat of arms
- Active: 1918–1919; 1942–1945; 1948–1957
- Country: United States
- Branch: Army
- Type: Infantry
- Role: Light Infantry
- Size: Regiment
- Part of: 10th Mountain Division
- Mottos: "Courage and Dependability"

Commanders
- Notable commanders: Willard K. Liebel

Insignia
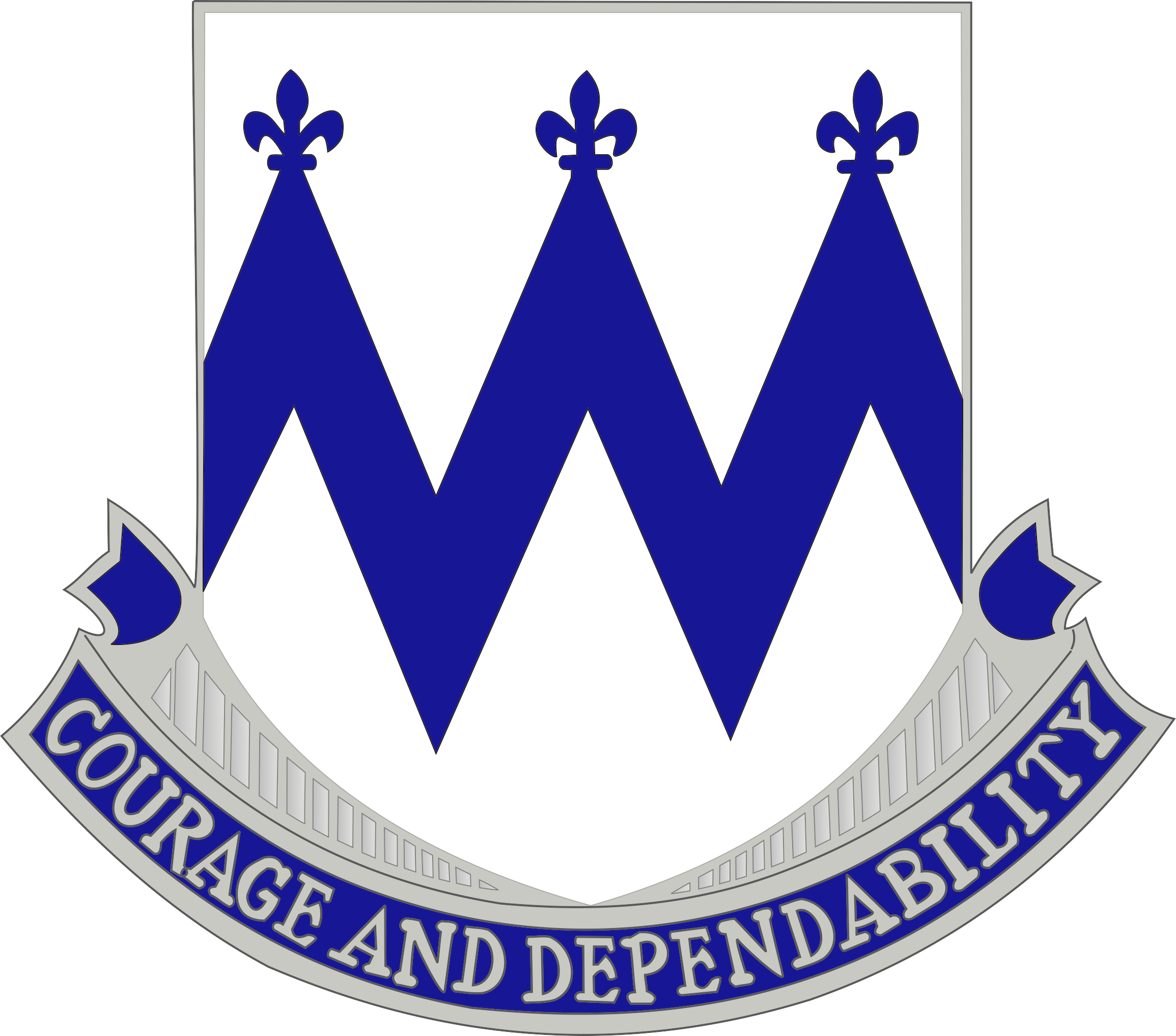
- Distinctive unit insignia

The 86th Infantry Regiment was an infantry regiment in the United States Army.

The 86th Infantry was briefly activated during World War I but never sent overseas, then reactivated during World War II at Camp Hale in 1942, with 3 Battalions, and attached to the 10th Mountain Division. The regiment served with the 10th Mountain in Italy and was inactivated postwar. In 1948 it was reactivated and saw duty in Germany before inactivating in 1957.

== History ==
The regiment was constituted on 31 July 1918 in the Regular Army as the 86th Infantry and assigned to the 18th Infantry Division. It was organized in September 1918 at Camp Travis, Texas from personnel of the 35th Infantry. The 86th was relieved from the 18th Division and demobilized on 13 February 1919 at Camp Travis.

The regiment was constituted on 25 November 1942 in the Army of the United States as the 86th Infantry. It was activated between 12 December 1942 and 1 May 1943 at Camp Hale, Colorado, and assigned to the 10th Mountain Division on 15 July 1943. The regiment was redesignated the 86th Mountain Infantry and assigned to the 10th Mountain Division on 6 November 1944. It was inactivated on 27 November 1945 at Camp Carson, Colorado.

The regiment was redesignated the 86th Infantry and assigned to 10th Infantry Division on 18 June 1948. It was allotted to the regular Army on 25 June 1948, and activated on 1 July 1948 at Fort Riley, Kansas. The 86th was inactivated for the last time on 1 July 1957 in Germany.

== Campaign streamers ==
World War II

- North Apennines
- Po Valley

== Distinctive unit insignia ==
- Description

A Silver color metal and enamel device 1 1/8 inches (2.9 cm) in height overall consisting of a shield blazoned: Argent, a fess dancetté the points to chief fleury Azure. Attached below and to the sides of the shield is a Blue scroll inscribed "COURAGE AND DEPENDABILITY" in Silver letters.

- Symbolism

The shield is in the colors of the Infantry. The ordinary, dancetté partition lines, and the fleury peaks are symbolic of the mountains in which the organization fought in Italy in World War II. The two campaigns in which the Regiment participated are North Apennines and Po Valley.

- Background

The distinctive unit insignia was approved on 6 September 1951. It was amended to correct the symbolism on 4 March 1955.

== Coat of arms ==
Blazon

- Shield- Argent, a fess dancetté the points to chief fleury Azure.
- Crest- None.
- Motto- COURAGE AND DEPENDABILITY.

Symbolism

- Shield- The shield is in the colors of the Infantry. The ordinary, dancetté partition lines, and the fleury peaks are symbolic of the mountains in which the organization fought in Italy in World War II. The two campaigns in which the Regiment participated are Operation Encore and Operation Craftsman.
- Crest- None.

Background- The coat of arms was approved on 6 September 1951. It was amended to correct the symbolism on 4 March 1955.
