= 50th Infantry Regiment (United States) =

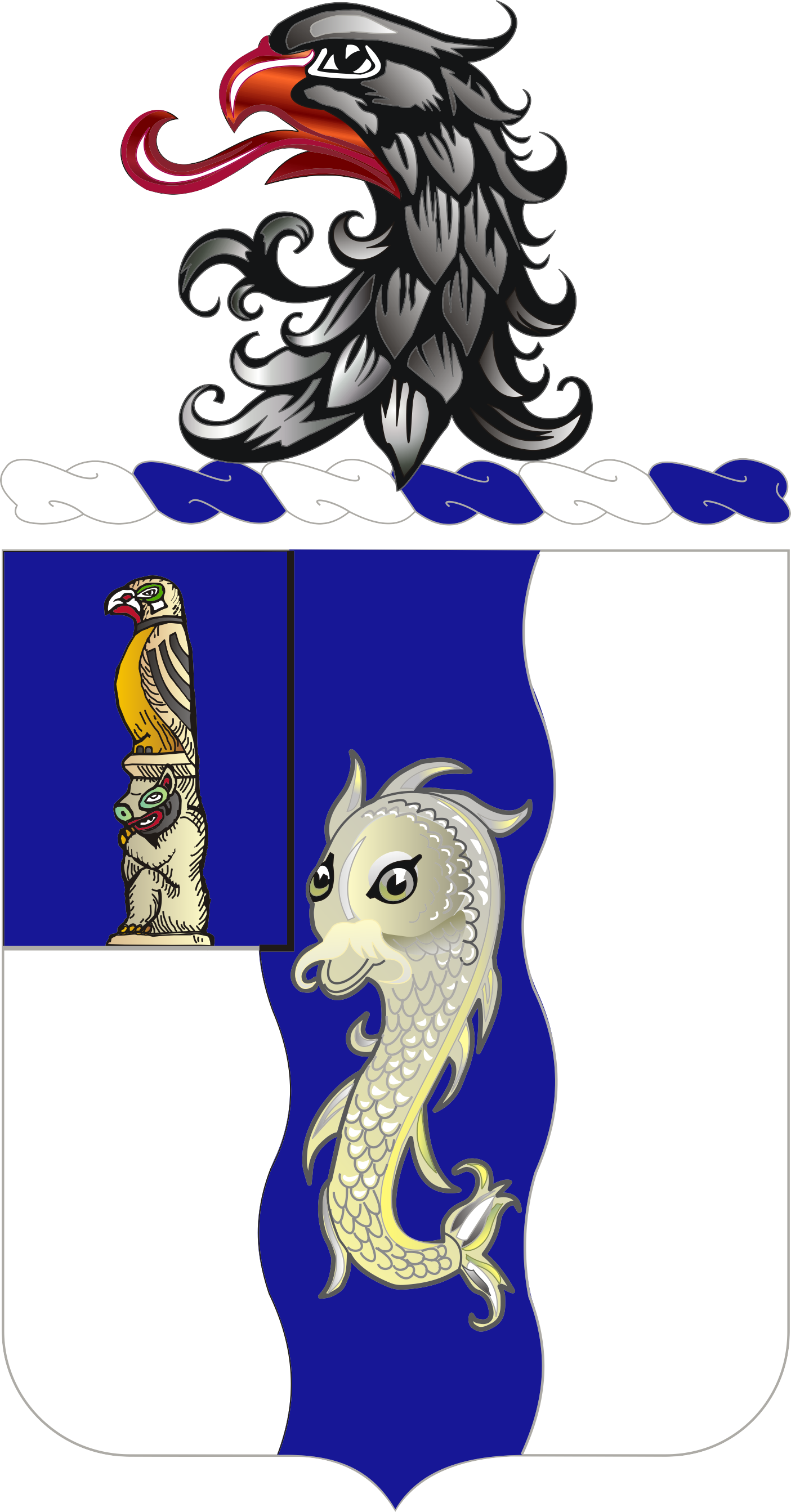
- Coat of arms
- Active: May 1917–present
- Country: United States
- Branch: United States Army
- Type: Infantry One Station Unit Training (OSUT)
- Garrison/HQ: Fort Benning, Georgia
- Motto: Play the Game
- Engagements: World War II; Vietnam War

Commanders
- Current commander: LTC Brandon Bangsboll (May 2024–present)
- CSM: CSM Joshua McDonough (Oct 2025-present)

Insignia
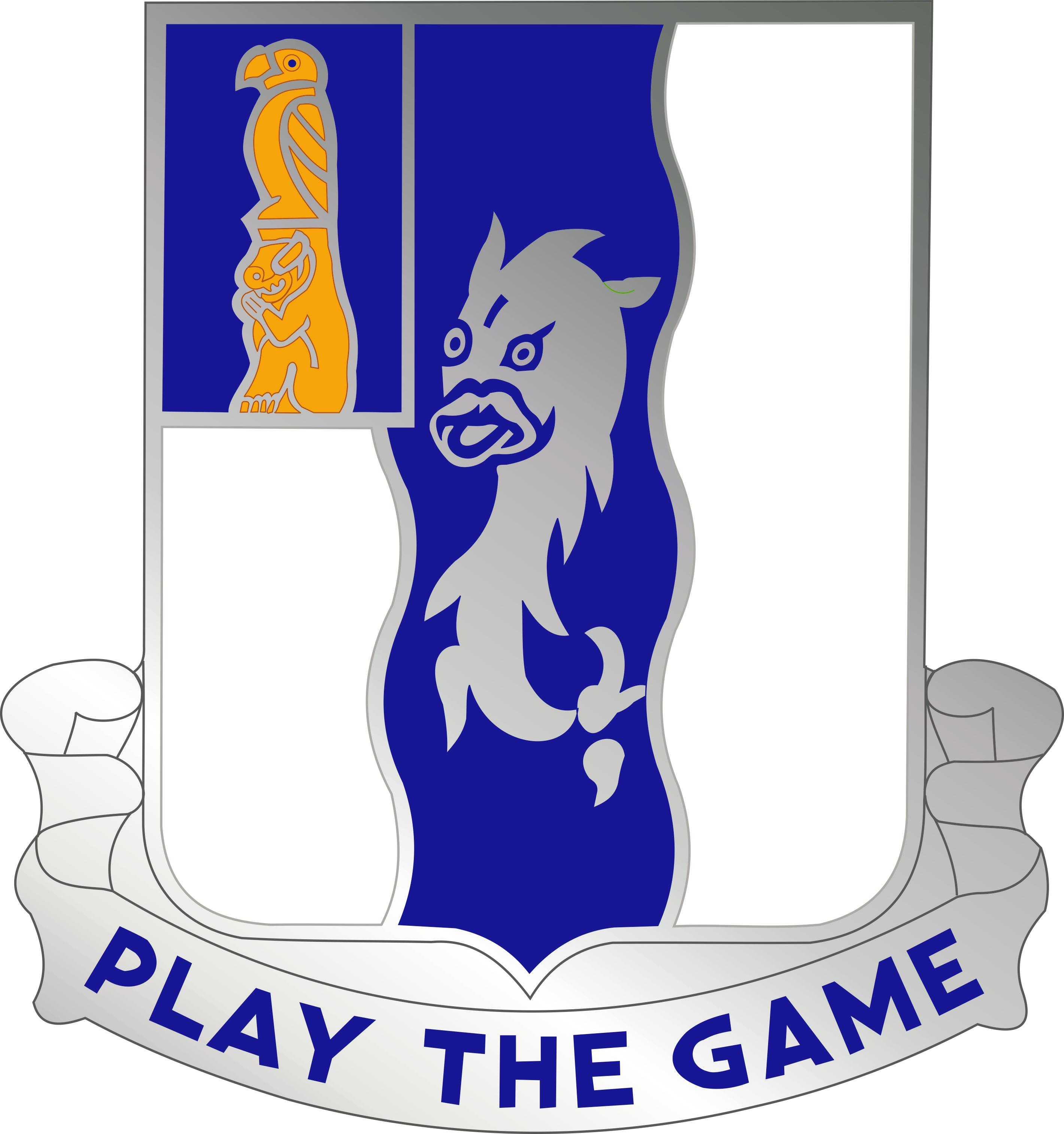
- Distinctive Unit Insignia

The 50th Infantry Regiment is a United States Army infantry regiment.

== Lineage ==
- Constituted 15 May 1917 in the Regular Army as the 50th Infantry.
- Organized 1 June 1917 at Syracuse, New York.
- Assigned 31 July 1918 to the 20th Division.
- Relieved 28 February 1919 from assignment to the 20th Division.
- Inactivated 31 December 1921 in Germany.
- Demobilized 31 July 1922.
- Reconstituted 8 January 1942 in the Regular Army as the 50th Armored Infantry and assigned to the 6th Armored Division.
- Activated 15 February 1942 at Fort Knox, Kentucky.
- Regiment broken up 20 September 1943 and its elements reorganized and redesignated as elements of the 6th Armored Division as follows:
  - 50th Armored Infantry (less 1st and 2d Battalions) as the 50th Armored Infantry Battalion
  - 1st Battalion as the 44th Armored Infantry Battalion
  - 2d Battalion as the 9th Armored Infantry Battalion
- After 20 September 1943 the above units underwent changes as follows:
  - 50th and 9th Armored Infantry Battalions inactivated 18 September 1945 at Camp Shanks, New York
- Activated 5 September 1950 at Fort Leonard Wood, Missouri.
- Inactivated 16 March 1956 at Fort Leonard Wood, Missouri.
- Relieved 1 July 1957 from assignment to the 6th Armored Division.
- 50th, 44th, and 9th Armored Infantry Battalions consolidated 1 July 1959 to form the 50th Infantry, a parent regiment under the Combat Arms Regimental System.
- Reorganized and redesignated 1 July 1963 as the 1st Battalion, 50th Infantry
- Relieved 1 September 1967 from assignment to the 2d Armored Division for duty in the Republic of Vietnam.
  - Served under the 1st Cavalry Division (Airmobile) [Binh Dinh Province] Sep 1967 - Feb 1968.
  - Served under the 3d Brigade, 4th Infantry Division [Binh Dinh and Kontum Provinces] Mar 1968 - Apr 1968.
  - Served under the 173d Airborne Brigade (Separate) [Binh Dinh Province] May 1968 - Sep 1969.
  - Served under Task Force South, I Field Force Vietnam [Binh Thuan Province] Oct 1969 - Dec 1970
  - Additional 50th Infantry Units in Vietnam:
    - Co. E (LRP), 50th Infantry, 9th Infantry Division; Dec 1967 - Jan 1969 [Later became Co. E, 75th Infantry (Ranger)].
    - Co. F (LRP), 50th Infantry, 25th Infantry Division; Dec 1967 - Jan 1969 [Later became Co. F, 75th Infantry (Ranger)].
    - Company E (Rifle Security), 50th Infantry, Company F (Rifle Security), 50th Infantry, both served as security for U.S. Army Support Command, Da Nang - June 1971 - November 1972
    - 50th Infantry Platoon Scout Dogs (50th IPSD), 4th Infantry Division [Pleiku] 07 March 1967 - 10 December 1970.
- Assigned 16 December 1970 to the 2d Armored Division, Fort Hood, Texas.
- Inactivated 27 January 1983 at Fort Hood, Texas and relieved from assignment to the 2d Armored Division.
- Withdrawn 28 August 1987 from the Combat Arms Regimental System, reorganized under the United States Army Regimental System, and transferred to the United States Army Training and Doctrine Command with headquarters at Fort Benning, Georgia.
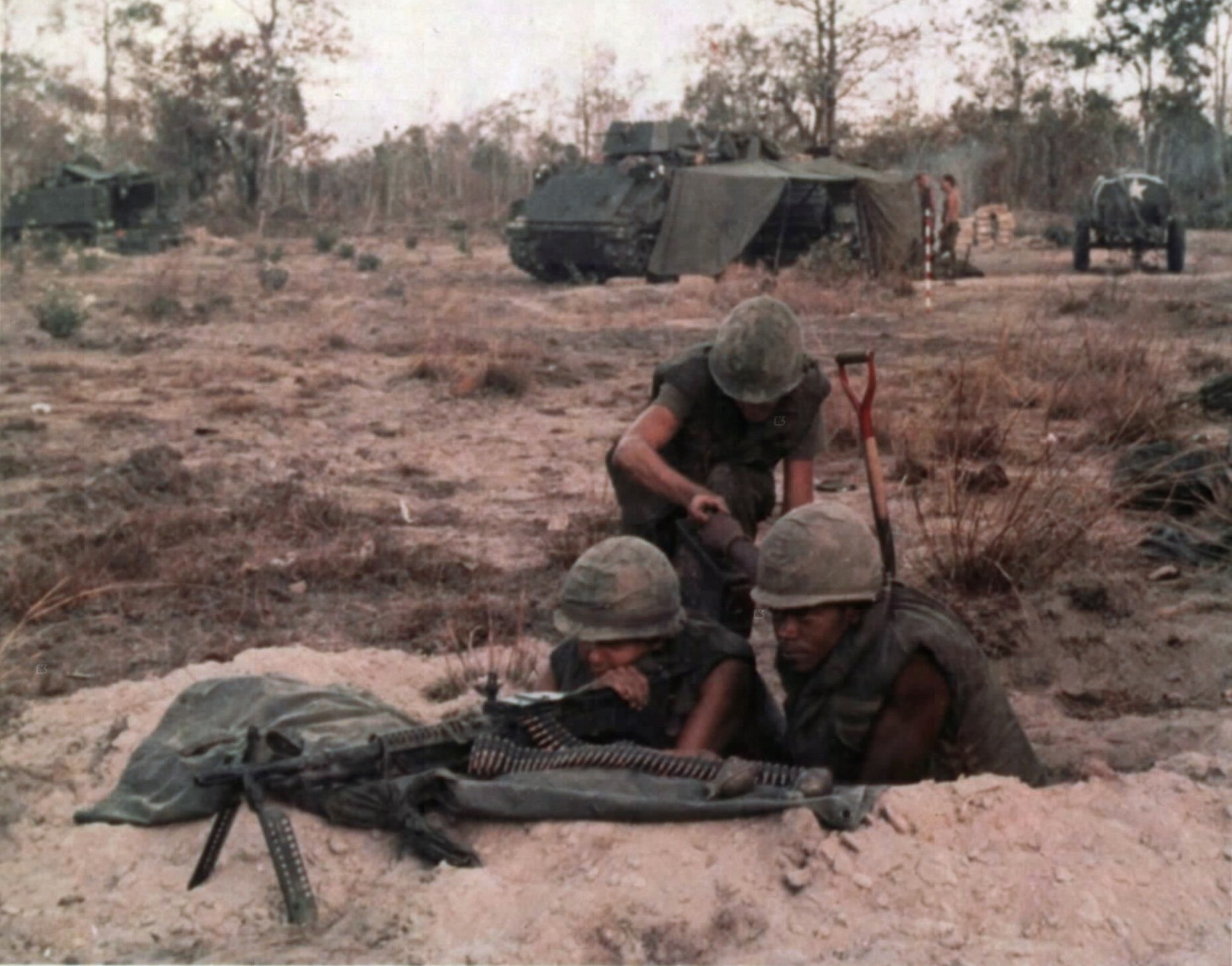
- Members of Company A, 1st Battalion, 50th Infantry setting up a M60 machine gun position during a search and clear mission in the Vietnam War, 1970. M113 armored personnel carriers are visible in the background.
  Assigned as part of the 198th Infantry Brigade, after the Brigade's reactivation on 15 May 2007 at Fort Benning, Georgia, to serve as an Infantry Training Brigade.

== Campaign participation credit ==
- World War II
  - Normandy
  - Northern France
  - Rhineland
  - Ardennes-Alsace
  - Central Europe
- Vietnam
  - Counteroffensive, Phase III
  - Tet Counteroffensive
  - Counteroffensive, Phase IV
  - Counteroffensive, Phase V
  - Counteroffensive, Phase VI
  - Tet 69/CounterOffensive
  - Summer-Fall 1969
  - Winter-Spring 1970
  - Sanctuary Counteroffensive
  - Counteroffensive, Phase VII
  - Consolidation I
  - Consolidation II
  - Cease-Fire

== Decorations ==
- Valorous Unit Award, Streamer embroidered BINH DUONG PROVINCE, French
- Croix de Guerre with Palm, World War II, Streamer embroidered BREST
- Republic of Vietnam Cross of Gallantry with Palm, Streamer embroidered VIETNAM 1968–1969
- Republic of Vietnam Cross of Gallantry with Palm, Streamer embroidered VIETNAM 1969–1970
- Republic of Vietnam Cross of Gallantry with Silver Star, Streamer embroidered VIETNAM 1969–1970
- Republic of Vietnam Civil Action Honor Medal, First Class, Streamer embroidered VIETNAM 1969–1970

== Motto ==
The unit's motto "Play the Game" was taken from "Vitai Lampada" ("They Pass On The Torch of Life"), a poem written in 1892 by Sir Henry Newbolt (1862–1938).

== Distinctive unit insignia ==
- Description

A Silver color metal and enamel device 1 1/8 inches (2.9 cm) in height overall consisting of a shield blazoned: Argent, on a pale wavy Azure a dolphin hauriant embowed of the field, on a canton of the second the totem pole of the 23d Infantry Tenné. Attached below the shield a Silver scroll inscribed "PLAY THE GAME" in Blue letters.

- Symbolism

The Regiment was organized in 1917 at Syracuse, New York, by drafts of personnel from the 23d Infantry. The shield is white and blue for Infantry. The device of Syracuse is a dolphin. The parentage of the Regiment is indicated in the canton. The 23rd took over Alaska in 1867 and this is commemorated by the crest of that Regiment which is an eagle, the new owner America, upon a plate which is upon the head of a bear, the old owner Russia, the story being that the old owner gave a feast to the new owner when the country changed hands. The 50th's overseas service in World War I was in the Army of Occupation in the Rhine country indicated by the pale with wavy edges. It had been under orders for Silesia at the time of the Armistice.

- Background

The distinctive unit insignia was originally approved for the 50th Armored Infantry Regiment on 14 October 1942. It was redesignated for the 50th Armored Infantry Battalion on 10 November 1943. The insignia was redesignated for the 50th Infantry Regiment on 25 November 1958.

== Coat of arms ==
- Blazon
  - Shield: Argent, on a pale wavy Azure a dolphin hauriant embowed of the field, on a canton of the second the totem pole of the 23d Infantry Proper.
  - Crest: In a wreath of the colors an eagle's head erased Sable, beaked and langued Gules (of the Rhine Province).
  - Motto: PLAY THE GAME.
- Symbolism
  - Shield: The Regiment was organized in 1917 at Syracuse, New York, by drafts of personnel from the 23rd Infantry. The shield is white and blue for Infantry. The device of Syracuse is a dolphin. The parentage of the Regiment is indicated in the canton. The 23rd took over Alaska in 1867 and this is commemorated by the crest of that Regiment which is an eagle, the new owner America, upon a plate which is upon the head of a bear, the old owner Russia, the story being that the old owner gave a feast to the new owner when the country changed hands. The 50th's overseas service in World War I was in the Army of Occupation in the Rhine country indicated by the pale with wavy edges. It had been under orders for Silesia at the time of the Armistice.
  - Crest: The crest is the eagle's head of the two provinces of Rhine and Silesia.
- Background: The coat of arms was originally approved for the 50th Infantry Regiment on 11 April 1922. It was redesignated for the 50th Armored Infantry Regiment on 7 August 1942. It was redesignated for the 50th Armored Infantry Battalion on 10 November 1943. The insignia was redesignated for the 50th Infantry Regiment on 25 November 1958.

== See also ==
- U.S. Army Regimental System
