= Gail Halvorsen =

US Air Force officer (1920–2022)

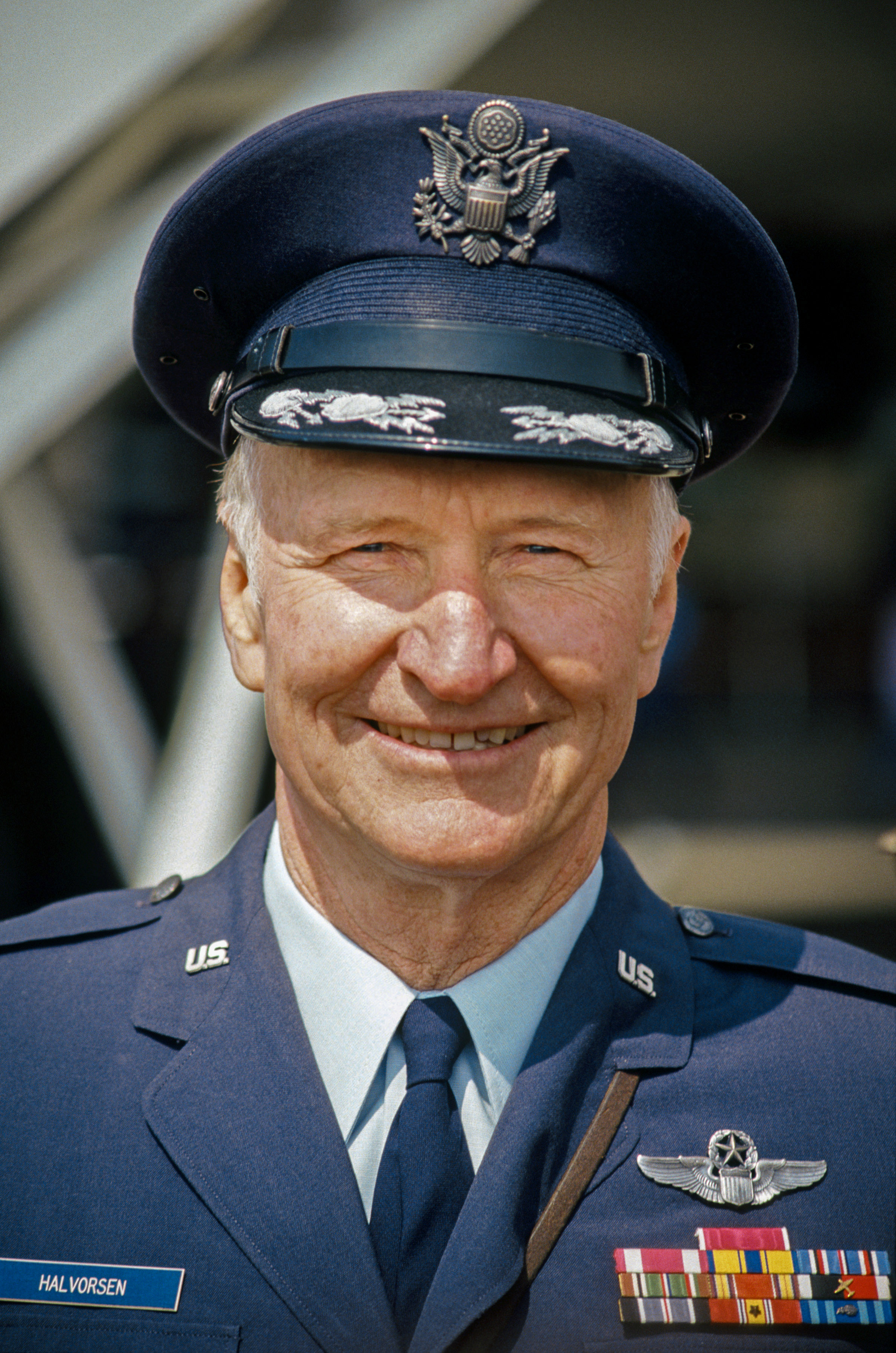
- Halvorsen in c. 1983
- Born: October 10, 1920; Salt Lake City, Utah, U.S.
- Died: February 16, 2022 (aged 101); Provo, Utah, U.S.
- Education: Utah State University; University of Florida; Wayne State University
- Spouses: Alta Jolley (m. 1949; died 1999) Lorraine Pace (m. 2004)
- Military career
- Allegiance: United States
- Branch: U.S. Army Air Forces; United States Air Force
- Service years: 1942–1974
- Rank: Colonel
- Nicknames: Uncle Wiggly Wings; Berlin Candy Bomber
- Unit: Air Force Materiel Command
- Commands: 7350th Air Base Group; Berlin Tempelhof Airport; 6596th Instrumentation Squadron
- Conflicts: World War II; Atlantic Theatre; Cold War; Berlin Airlift
- Awards: Legion of Merit; Meritorious Service Medal; Congressional Gold Medal; Order of Merit (Germany)
- Website: Official Website

Colonel Gail Seymour Halvorsen (October 10, 1920 – February 16, 2022) was a senior officer and command pilot in the United States Air Force. He rose to fame for dropping candy to German children during the Berlin Airlift from 1948 to 1949, for which he was nicknamed "Berlin Candy Bomber" or "Uncle Wiggly Wings".

Halvorsen grew up in rural Utah and always had a desire to fly. He earned his private pilot's license in 1941 and then joined the Civil Air Patrol. He joined the United States Army Air Forces in 1942 and was assigned to Germany on July 10, 1948, to be a pilot for the Berlin Airlift. Halvorsen piloted C-47s and C-54s during the Berlin airlift ("Operation Vittles"). During that time he founded "Operation Little Vittles", an effort to raise morale in Berlin by dropping candy via miniature parachute to the city's residents. Halvorsen began "Little Vittles" with no authorization from his superiors but over the next year became a national hero with support from all over the United States. Halvorsen's operation dropped over 23 tons of candy to the residents of Berlin. He became known as the "Berlin Candy Bomber", "Uncle Wiggly Wings", and "The Chocolate Flier".

Halvorsen received numerous awards for his role in "Operation Little Vittles", including the Congressional Gold Medal. However, "Little Vittles" was not the end of Halvorsen's military and humanitarian career. Over the next 25 years, Halvorsen advocated and performed candy drops in Bosnia-Herzegovina, Albania, Japan, Guam, and Iraq. Halvorsen's professional career included various notable positions. He helped to develop reusable crewed spacecraft at the Directorate of Space and Technology and served as commander of Berlin Tempelhof Airport. He retired in August 1974 after logging over 8,000 flying hours. From 1976 until 1986, Halvorsen served as the Assistant Dean of Student Life at Brigham Young University (BYU).

== Early life ==
Gail Seymour Halvorsen was born in Salt Lake City on October 10, 1920, to Basil K. and Luella Spencer Halvorsen. His paternal grandfather was born in Norway He grew up on small farms first in Rigby, Idaho, and then in Garland, Utah. He graduated from Bear River High School in 1939 and then briefly attended Utah State University. He earned his private pilot license under the non-college Civilian Pilot Training Program in September 1941, and at about the same time joined the Civil Air Patrol as a pilot. Halvorsen joined the United States Army Air Forces in May 1942 and was 22 when he arrived in Miami, Oklahoma, to train with 25 other USAAF Aviation cadets, and 77 Royal Air Force cadets, in Course 19, at the No. 3 British Flying Training School, operated by the Spartan School of Aeronautics. After completing pilot training, he returned to the Army Air Forces and was assigned flight duties in foreign transport operations in the South Atlantic Theater. He was ordered to Germany on July 10, 1948, to be a pilot for "Operation Vittles", now known as the Berlin Airlift.

== Operation "Little Vittles" ==
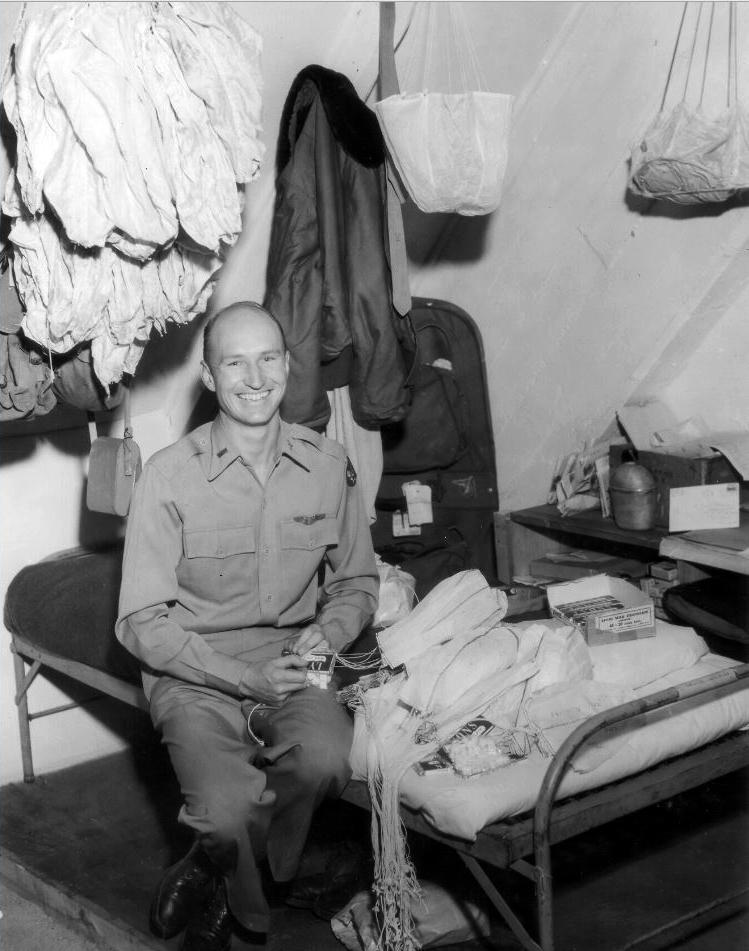
Halvorsen pioneered the idea of dropping candy bars and bubble gum with handmade miniature parachutes, which later became known as "Operation Little Vittles"

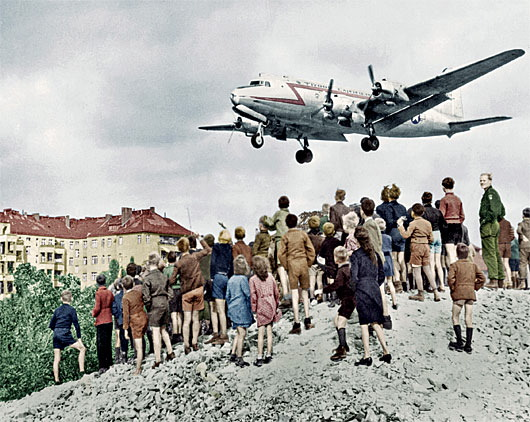
Douglas C-54 Skymaster landing at Berlin Tempelhof Airport, 1948

Lieutenant Halvorsen's role in the Berlin Airlift was to fly one of many C-54 cargo planes used to ferry supplies into the starving city. During his flights he would first fly to Berlin, then deeper into Soviet-controlled areas. Halvorsen had an interest in photography and on his days off often went sightseeing in Berlin and shot film on his personal handheld movie camera. One day in July, he was filming planes taking off and landing at Tempelhof, the main landing site for the airlift. While there, he saw about thirty children lined up behind one of the barbed-wire fences. He went to meet them and noticed that the children had nothing. Halvorsen remembers: "I met about thirty children at the barbed wire fence that protected Tempelhof's huge area. They were excited and told me that 'when the weather gets so bad that you can't land, don't worry about us. We can get by on a little food, but if we lose our freedom, we may never get it back.'" Touched, Halvorsen reached into his pocket and took out two sticks of gum to give to the children. The kids broke them into little pieces and shared them; the ones who did not get any sniffed the wrappers. Watching the children, so many of whom had absolutely nothing, Halvorsen regretted not having more to give them. Halvorsen recorded that he wanted to do more for the children, and so told them that the following day he would have enough gum for all of them, and he would drop it out of his plane. According to Halvorsen, one child asked "How will we know it is your plane?" to which Halvorsen responded that he would wiggle his wings, something he had done for his parents when he first got his pilot's license in 1941.

That night, Halvorsen, his copilot, and his engineer pooled their candy rations for the next day's drop. The accumulated candy was heavy, so in order to ensure that no children were hurt by the falling package, Halvorsen made three parachutes out of handkerchiefs and tied them to the rations. In the morning when Halvorsen and his crew made regular supply drops, they also dropped three boxes of candy attached to handkerchiefs. They made these drops once a week for three weeks. Each week, the group of children waiting at the Tempelhof airport fence grew significantly.

When word reached the airlift commander, Lieutenant General William H. Tunner, he ordered it expanded into Operation "Little Vittles", named as a play on the airlift's name of Operation Vittles. Operation Little Vittles began officially on September 22, 1948. Support for this effort to provide the children of Berlin with chocolate and gum grew quickly, first among Halvorsen's friends, then to the whole squadron. As news of Operation Little Vittles reached the United States, children and candymakers from all over the US began contributing candy. By November 1948, Halvorsen could no longer keep up with the amount of candy and handkerchiefs being sent from across America. College student Mary C. Connors of Chicopee, Massachusetts offered to take charge of the now national project and worked with the National Confectioner's Association to prepare the candy and tie the handkerchiefs. With the groundswell of support, Little Vittles pilots, of which Halvorsen was now one of many, were dropping candy every other day. Children all over Berlin had sweets, and more and more artwork was getting sent back with kind letters attached to them. The American candy bombers became known as the Rosinenbomber (Raisin Bombers), while Halvorsen himself became known by many nicknames to the children of Berlin, including his original moniker of "Uncle Wiggly Wings", as well as "The Chocolate Uncle", "The Gum Drop Kid" and "The Chocolate Flier".

Operation "Little Vittles" was in effect from September 22, 1948, to May 13, 1949. Although Lieutenant Halvorsen returned home in January 1949, he passed on leadership of the operation to one of his friends, Captain Lawrence Caskey. Upon his return home, Halvorsen met with several individuals who were key in making Operation "Little Vittles" a success. Halvorsen personally thanked his biggest supporter Dorothy Groeger, a homebound woman who nonetheless enlisted the help of all of her friends and acquaintances to sew handkerchiefs and donate funds. He also met the schoolchildren and "Little Vittles" committee of Chicopee, Massachusetts who were responsible for preparing over 18 tons of candy and gum from across the country and shipping it to Germany. In total, it is estimated that Operation "Little Vittles" was responsible for dropping over 23 tons of candy from over 250,000 parachutes.

== Professional career ==
After returning home in January 1949, Halvorsen considered the idea of leaving the Air Force. He changed his mind, however, when he was offered a permanent commission with full pay and the promise that the Air Force would send him to school. In 1951 and 1952 he earned bachelor's and master's degrees in Aeronautical Engineering from the University of Florida as an assignment from the Air Force Institute of Technology. He went on to be the project engineer for cargo aircraft research and development with the Wright Air Development Center at Wright-Patterson Air Force Base and Hill Air Force Base from 1952 to 1957. Halvorsen was reassigned in 1957 to the Air Command and Staff College at Maxwell AFB, Alabama. He was there until 1958, when he was assigned at the Air Force Space Systems Division of Air Force Systems Command in Inglewood, California. While on this assignment, Halvorsen researched and developed various space projects. The most notable of these was the Titan III launch vehicle program, for which he chaired source selection. Halvorsen would serve as part of Air Force Systems Command for the next four years.

From 1962 to 1965, Halvorsen served in Wiesbaden, West Germany, with the Foreign Technology division of AF Systems Command. He was next assigned to the Deputy Chief of Staff for Research and Development, HQ USAF, the Pentagon, and in the Directorate of Space and Technology. He developed plans for the advanced manned reusable spacecraft, space policy and procedures, and on the Manned Orbital Laboratory Project. He then was given the command of the 6596th Instrumentation Squadron of the AF Systems Command Satellite Control Facility, Vandenberg AFB, California, which was involved in both satellite launch and orbit operations.

Halvorsen then became the Commander of the 7350th Air Base Group at Tempelhof Central Airport, Berlin, Germany, in February 1970. It was the very same airfield he flew to daily during the Berlin Airlift. During this period, he also served as the US Air Force Europe Representative in Berlin, as well as completing a master's degree in Guidance and Counseling from Wayne State University through an on-base educational program. His final assignment was as the Inspector General, Ogden Air Materiel Center, Hill AFB, Utah. Halvorsen retired on August 31, 1974, having accumulated over 8,000 flying hours and 31 years of military service.

== Personal life and death ==
Halvorsen's work with Operation "Little Vittles" not only won him international acclaim, but "drew him two proposals" according to one U.S. newspaper. He turned both of them down, hoping that the girl he left home in Garland, Utah, would still have feelings for him. Halvorsen had met Alta Jolley in 1942 at Utah State Agricultural College. After Halvorsen left for Germany, the couple carried on their courtship via mail. Gail Halvorsen and Alta Jolley were married in Las Vegas, Nevada, on April 16, 1949. The Halvorsens had five children, all of whom were raised in various parts of the United States and Germany as Halvorsen fulfilled his military assignments. After Halvorsen's retirement in 1974, the couple moved to Provo, Utah. From 1976 until 1986 Halvorsen served as the Assistant Dean of Student Life at BYU. Alta and Halvorsen were both active in the Church of Jesus Christ of Latter-day Saints (LDS Church). They served as LDS Church missionaries from 1986 to 1987 in London, England, and again from 1995 to 1997 in St. Petersburg, Russia. Alta died on January 25, 1999, at which time the couple had 24 grandchildren. Five years later, Halvorsen married again, this time to his high school sweetheart, Lorraine Pace. The couple resided in Spanish Fork, Utah, on their farm, and spent winters in Arizona. In January 2021, it was reported that he had recovered from COVID-19, which he had contracted about one month before.

Halvorsen died from respiratory failure in Provo on February 16, 2022, at the age of 101. After funeral services conducted for him with full military honors, which included a flyover by a KC-135R of the Utah Air National Guard's 151st Air Refueling Wing and a firing party by honor guard members from the Air Force ROTC units from BYU and Utah Valley University, he was buried at the Provo City Cemetery.

== Legacy ==
Halvorsen's work with Operation "Little Vittles" had a profound impact on lives both in the United States and throughout the world. After his official retirement in 1974, Halvorsen continued to serve the local, national, and international community in a variety of ways.

Many children who received sweets during Operation Little Vittles later came to view the participating American pilots as father figures, despite the fact that many of those same pilots had previously taken part in World War II operations against German cities. Mercedes Wild, who wrote to pilot Gail Halvorsen in 1948 requesting chocolate, reflected 75 years later that he “became a father to me at that young age.” She noted that “the children of the post-war period grew up mostly without a father; the pilots and their companions were, especially among the children, role models.”

After Halvorsen's death in 2022, Berlin mayor Franziska Giffey stated, "Halvorsen's deeply human act has never been forgotten."

In 2016, Gail Halvorsen, alongside his daughter Denise Halvorsen Williams and friend James Stewart, established the Gail S. Halvorsen Aviation Education Foundation, later renamed The Candy Bomber Foundation. Registered as a 501(c)(3) nonprofit in Utah, the foundation aims to promote aviation and STEM education among young people.

In June 2022, Senator Mike Lee proposed legislation to rename the Provo Vet Center in Halvorsen's honor. The facility was rededicated in his honor on November 21, 2022.

== Awards ==
Halvorsen had the following awards and badges:

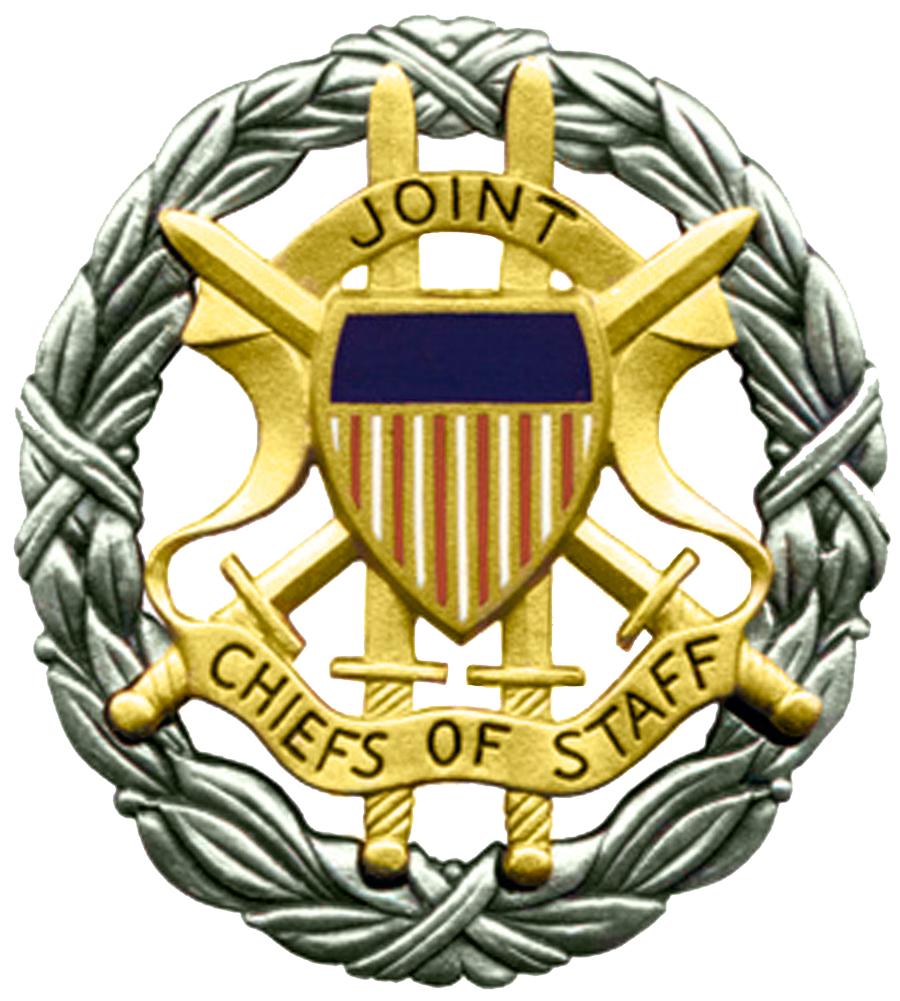
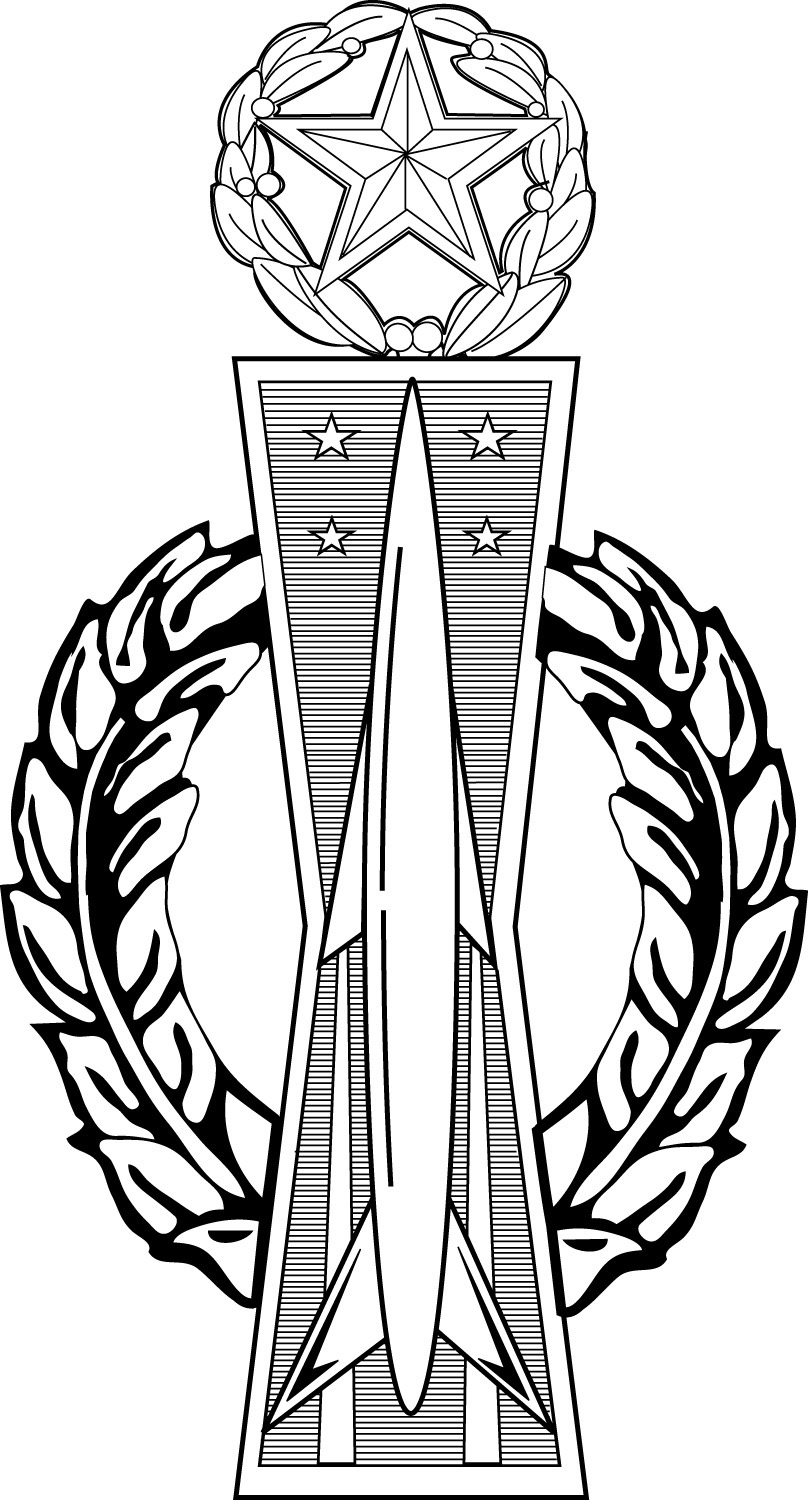

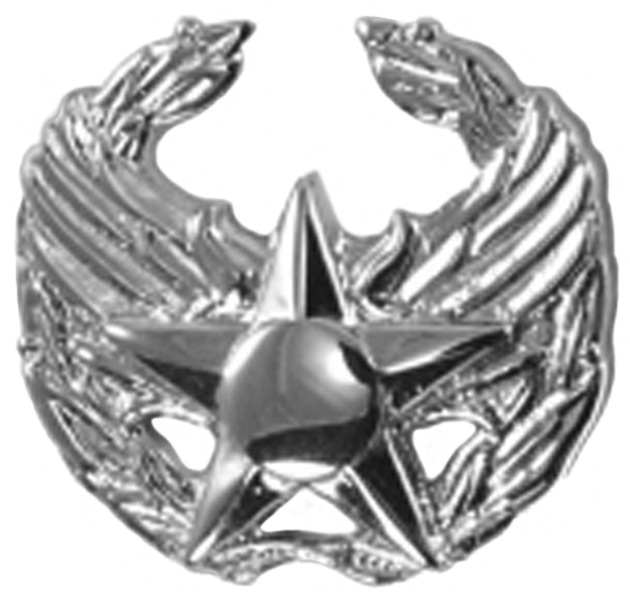
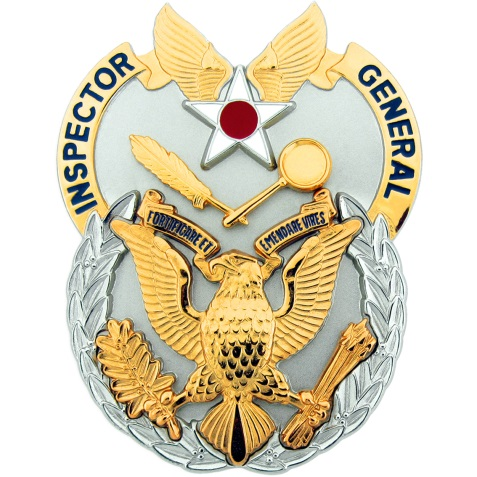

US Air Force Command Pilot Badge
Legion of Merit	Meritorious Service Medal	Air Force Commendation Medal
American Campaign Medal	European–African–Middle Eastern Campaign Medal	World War II Victory Medal
Army of Occupation Medal w/Berlin Airlift Device	Medal for Humane Action	National Defense Service Medal w/1 bronze service star
Air Force Longevity Service Award w/1 silver and 1 bronze oak leaf clusters	Small Arms Expert Marksmanship Ribbon	Order of Merit (Germany) (Commander's Cross)
Badges
United States Joint Chiefs of Staff Badge	United States European Command Badge	Command Missile Operations Badge
Headquarters Air Force Badge	Air Force Commander's Insignia	Air Force Inspector General Badge

In 1949 Halvorsen received the Cheney Award, given by the Air Force to recognize humanitarian action, from General Hoyt S. Vandenberg for the inception of Operation "Little Vittles". Other prominent awards include the Legion of Merit, Ira Baker "Fellow" Award by the USAF Chief of Staff General John Dale Ryan; Air Force Sergeants Association "Americanism" Award (some previous recipients were Bob Hope and President George Bush); Freedom Award from City of Provo, Utah; The Distinguished Humanitarian Award from the Institute of German Relations; the Eric Warburg Preis, 1998; and the Patriot Award from Brigham Young University ROTC. In 2014, Halvorsen became a recipient of the Congressional Gold Medal, the highest award that Congress can give to a civilian. He was inducted into the Airlift/Tanker Association Hall of Fame and the Utah Aviation Hall of Fame in May 2001. The United States Air Force has helped cement Colonel Halvorsen's airlift legacy by naming its next generation, 25,000-pound capacity aircraft loading vehicle in his honor. The Air Force has also created the Col. Gail Halvorsen Award for outstanding air transportation support in the logistics readiness career field. In 2008, Halvorsen was honored as Grand Marshal of the German-American Steuben Parade in New York City, where he was celebrated by tens of thousands of spectators on Fifth Avenue.

Halvorsen's actions during the Berlin Airlift had a substantial impact on German-American relations in the years to come. For his efforts, he has also been extensively honored by the German people. In 1974 he was decorated with the Großes Bundesverdienstkreuz (Grand Cross of the Order of Merit of the Federal Republic of Germany), Germany's highest award. In 2015 he was awarded the General Lucius D. Clay medal by the Federation of German-American Clubs. The medal is the highest honor granted to an individual who has contributed significantly to the development of German-American relations. In addition, he has had numerous German schools named in his honor, including a secondary school in Berlin and the Gail S. Halvorsen Elementary school at Rhein-Main Air Base, Frankfurt, Germany. In January 2026 the access road around the new Frankfurt Flughafen parking facility was named Gail Halverson-Schleife in his honor https://www.fnp.de/frankfurt/gail-halvorsen-schleife-strassen-am-terminal-erhalten-offizielle-namen-94118080.html. He has appeared many times on German television over the years, often paired with some of the children (now adults) who received his candy parachutes. On February 8, 2002, for the 2002 Winter Olympics in Salt Lake City, he carried the German national placard into the Rice-Eccles Stadium. He has also appeared extensively on American television and movies. In 1992, then Brigham Young University Student Michael Van Wagenen produced a 7-minute work entitled "The Candy Bomber", which was later made into a full-length film. In 2012 Halvorsen's story became the theme of the Mormon Tabernacle Choir Christmas concert, entitled Christmas from Heaven and narrated by Tom Brokaw.

On the occasion of the 70th anniversary, he was, meanwhile 98 years old, a part of the celebrations on the former airfield, on May the 12th 2019. To honor him, the former military baseball fields were named Gail S. Halverson Park. The Senate of Berlin is actually planning to tear down the historical fields, along with other sport facilities (e.g. a Basketball court, sponsored by Nike).

=== Humanitarian work ===
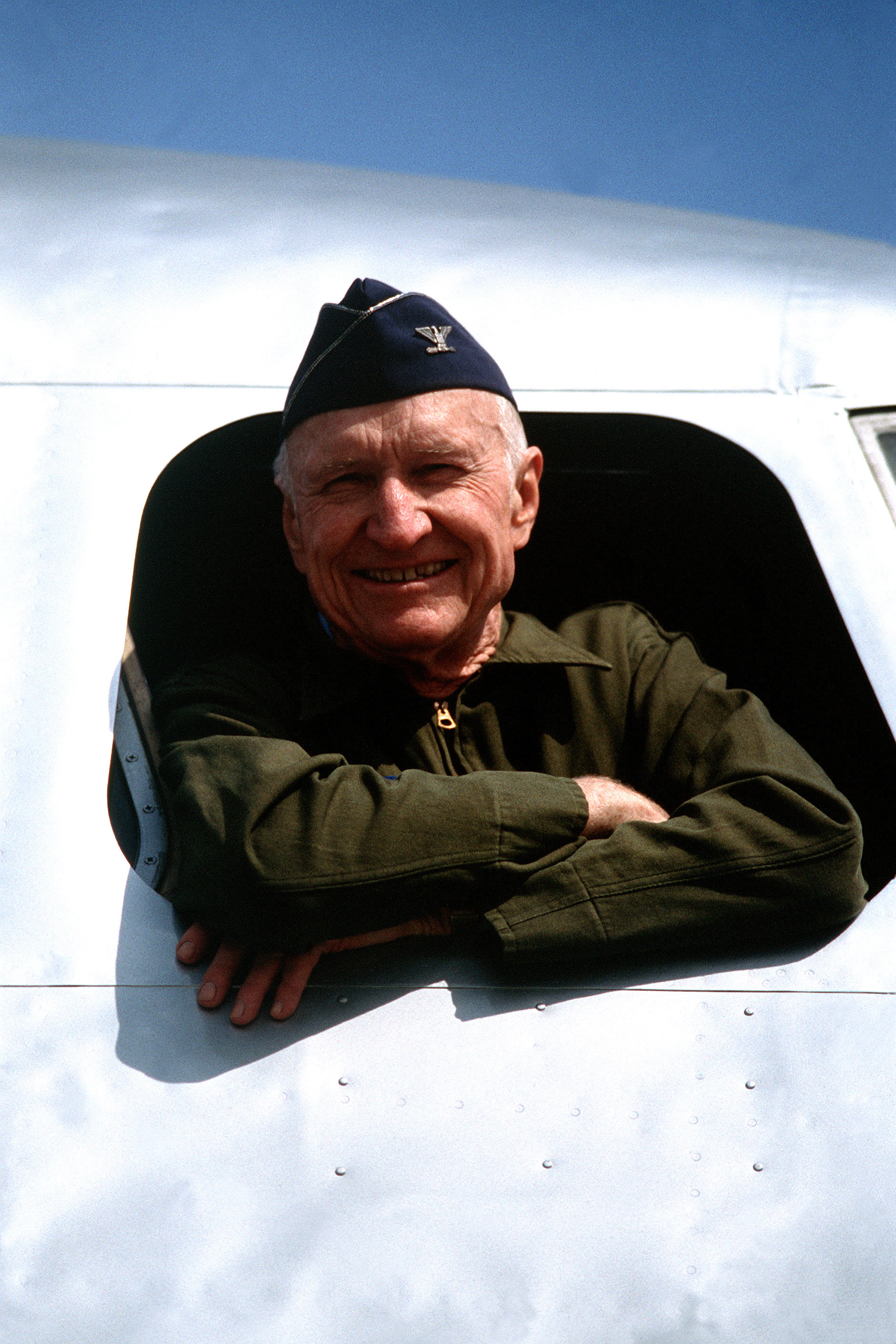
40th anniversary, 1989

During Halvorsen's career and for several years following his retirement, he voluntarily represented the U.S. Air Force and the United States of America. He helped to re-enact one of his famous candy drops in commemoration of the 20th anniversary of the Berlin Airlift. The event was held at the Tempelhof Central Airport with over 40,000 people in attendance. Another re-enactment occurred in September 1989 to commemorate the 40th anniversary of the airlift. Halvorsen again participated, this time with a television team from Good Morning America, and dropped candy to Berlin children, including some of the grandchildren of those he had originally given chocolate to. Additional re-enactments were performed in 1993 and 1994. In 1998, he was part of the regular flight crew of the Berlin Airlift Historical Foundation's C-54 Spirit of Freedom and took part in a 71-day European tour. The tour included two Atlantic Ocean crossings in the then 53-year-old airplane. During the tour, he and several other Airlift veterans (also members of the crew) took part in ceremonies in Germany, France, and the UK commemorating the 50th anniversary of the Airlift. Halvorsen would continue to fly with the group and perform candy drops with the BAHF until just after his 99th birthday. His last flight was on December 17, 2019, where he flew the Spirit of Freedom for the last time. Halvorsen also performed additional candy drops throughout the United States.

Halvorsen did not want to merely re-enact the candy drop to countries no longer plagued by war. In later years he advocated using candy drops to lift spirits and promote goodwill in other nations. In 1994 he persuaded the air force to let him drop hundreds of candy bars over Bosnia-Herzegovina as part of Operation Provide Promise. Another larger drop was planned and executed by Halvorsen over Kosovo in 1999. Additional candy drops have been enacted in Japan, Guam, Albania, and across the United States. In 2003 and 2004, he advocated a similar series of candy drops over Baghdad as a humanitarian mission to be a "ray of hope, a symbol that somebody in America cares". Since that time, the United States military has emulated some of his actions in Iraq by dropping toys, teddy bears, and soccer balls to Iraqi children.
