= 144th Operations Group =

Unit of the California Air National Guard

144th Operations Group

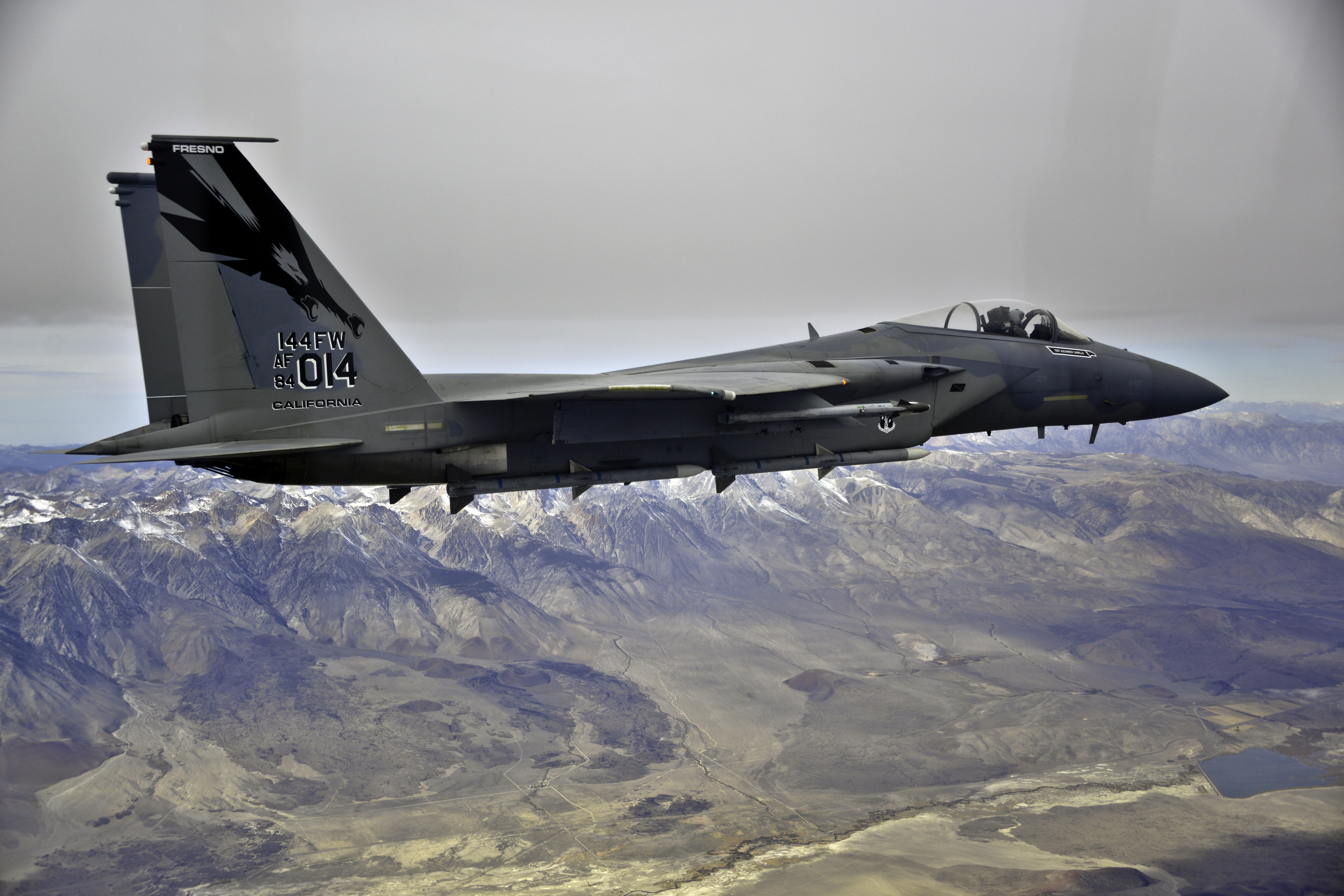
- F-15C Eagle of the 144th Group
- Active: 1943–1945; 1948–1976; 1992–present
- Country: United States
- Allegiance: California
- Branch: Air National Guard
- Type: Group
- Role: Air defense
- Part of: California Air National Guard
- Garrison/HQ: Fresno Air National Guard Base, California

Insignia
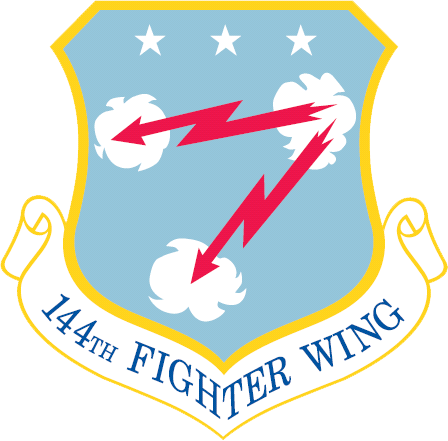
- 144th Operations Group emblem (Note: While assigned to the 144th Wing, the group uses the wing emblem with the group designation on the scroll. AF Instruction 84-105, Organizational Lineage, Honors and History, 27 April 2017, paragraph 3.3.3.)

Aircraft flown
- Fighter: McDonnell Douglas F-15 Eagle

The 144th Operations Group is a unit of the California Air National Guard, stationed at Fresno Air National Guard Base. It is the operational element of the 144th Fighter Wing. The group was activated in 1943 as the 372nd Fighter Group, an Operational Training Unit, but after moving to Louisiana, it also provided air support for military exercises and maneuvers. It was inactivated following the end of World War II on 7 November 1945.

The following May, it was redesignated the 144th Fighter Group and allotted to the National Guard Bureau, although it was not organized until 1948. It served in the California National Guard as a fighter unit until inactivating in 1976, when Air National Guard groups located on the same stations were eliminated. The group was redesignated the 144th Operations Group and activated in 1992, when the Air National Guard reorganized its units under the Objective Wing organization of the regular Air Force.

== History ==
=== World War II ===
The group was activated in late October 1943 at Hamilton Field, California as the 372nd Fighter Group. its assigned squadrons were the 407th, 408th and 409th Fighter Squadrons. The group moved to Portland Army Air Base, Oregon in early December. It was equipped with P-39 Airacobras, and began serving as an Operational Training Unit (OTU). The OTU program was patterned after the unit training system of the Royal Air Force. The program involved the use of an oversized parent unit to provide cadres to “satellite groups " It then assumed responsibility for their training and oversaw their expansion with graduates of Army Air Forces Training Command schools to become effective combat units. Phase I training concentrated on individual training in crewmember specialties. Phase II training emphasized the coordination for the crew to act as a team. The final phase concentrated on operation as a unit.

In March 1944, the group moved to Esler Field, Louisiana, but three weeks later moved to Pollock Army Air Field, Louisiana. The group was equipped with Curtiss P-40 Warhawks. In addition to its OTU duties, the 372nd provided air support for air-ground maneuvers and demonstrations. In the summer or 1944, it participated in the Louisiana Maneuvers. In June 1945, the group upgraded to North American P-51 Mustangs. Its time flying the Mustang was brief, however and as the Army Air Forces reduced in size following V-J Day, the group was inactivated in November 1945.

=== California Air National Guard ===
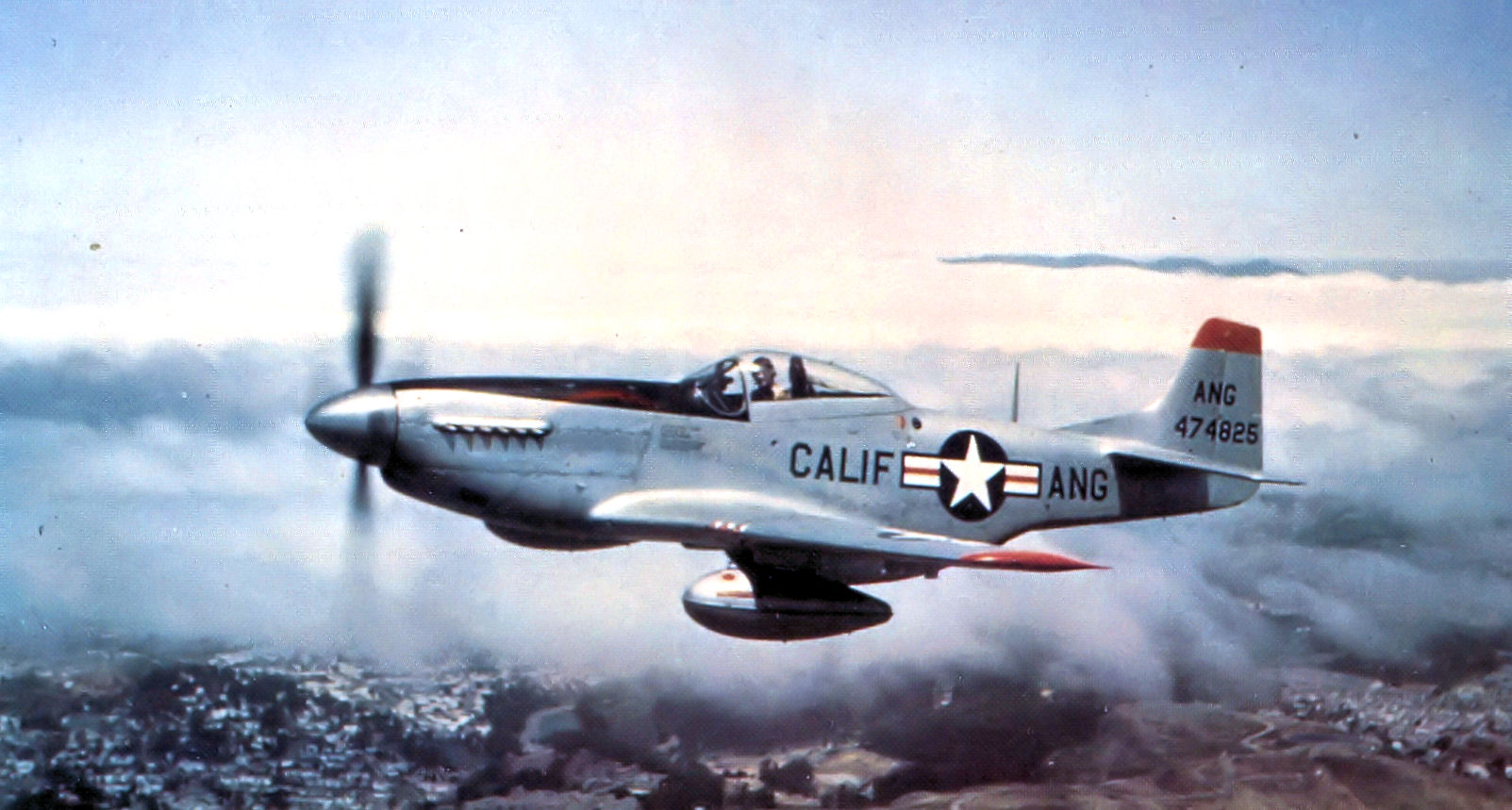
F-51 Mustang (Note: Aircraft is North American F-51D-30-NA Mustang, serial 44-74825.) flying over Northern California, 1948

In May 1946, the group was redesignated the 144th Fighter Group, and allotted to the National Guard Bureau. It was organized at Naval Air Station Alameda, California, and extended federal recognition on 2 June 1948. The group was assigned to the 61st Fighter Wing and assigned the 191st Fighter Squadron at Salt Lake City Municipal Airport, Utah; the 192nd Fighter Squadron at Hubbard Field, Nevada and the 194th Fighter Squadron, stationed with group headquarters. (Note: These three squadrons were the group's World War II squadrons, which had been redesignated and allotted to the National Guard. Maurer, Combat Squadrons, pp. 498, 500-01.) All were initially equipped with F-51D Mustangs, with a mission of air defense of their respective states. In 1949, the 144th and the 194th Fighter Squadron moved from NAS Alameda to the former Hayward Army Air Field, now Hayward Municipal Airport.

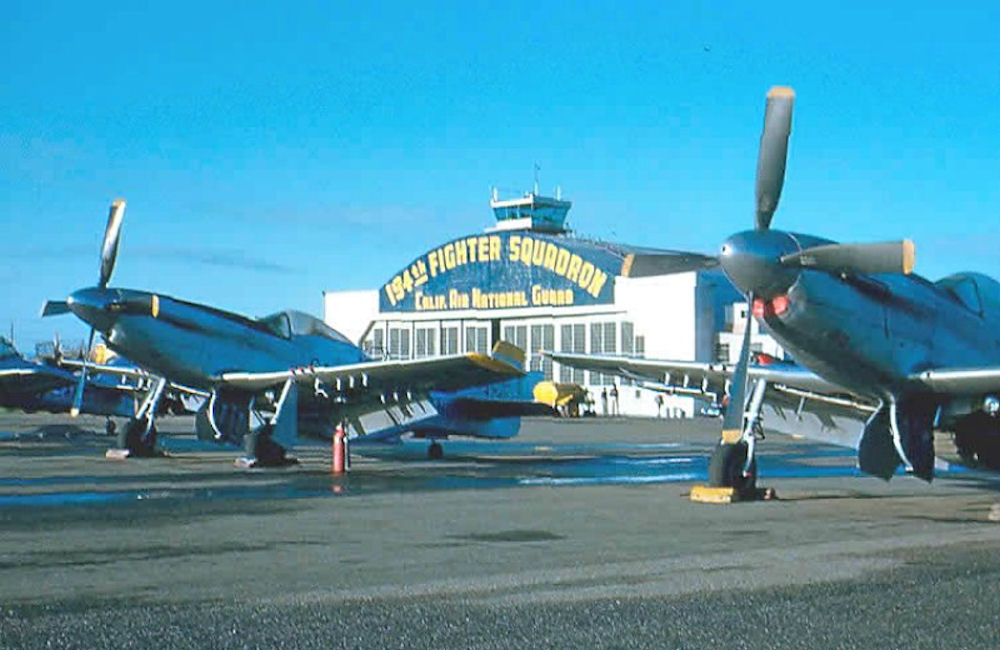
Hayward Air National Guard Base, California, 1953, F-51H Mustangs.

==== 144th Fighter Wing ====
At the end of October 1950, the Air National Guard converted to the Wing Base Organization. As a result, the 61st Fighter Wing was withdrawn from the National Guard and inactivated on 31 October 1950. The 144th Fighter Wing was established, allocated to the state of California, and activated on 1 November 1950, assuming the personnel, equipment, and mission of the inactivated 61st Wing. The 144th Group was assigned to the new wing as its operational group.

==== Air Defense Mission ====
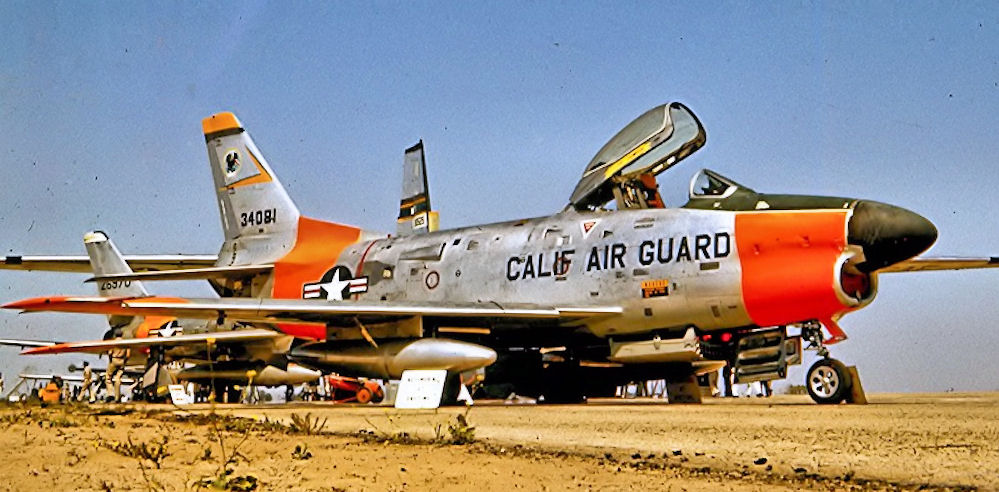
194th FIS F-86L Sabre Interceptors, 1960

Most of the Air National Guard was federalized and placed on active duty during the Korean War. The 144th Fighter Group were not called up, although numerous members of the group volunteered for active duty. The group replaced its F-51Ds with newer F-51H Mustangs in 1951, The F-51H was a very long range version of the Mustang. Its increased range was well-suited for air defense. In October 1952, the group became the 144th Fighter-Interceptor Group. Although it became the 144th Fighter-Bomber Group two months later, it retained an air defense mission. In June 1953, while still flying the Mustang, the unit qualified for the first all-jet, worldwide gunnery meet. Using borrowed North American F-86A Sabres, the 144th, which represented the Air National Guard, placed fifth in the competition.

With the increased availability of jet aircraft after the Korean War, the squadron received its first jet aircraft, the F-86A Sabre in 1954. At the same time, the 194th relocated to Fresno Air Terminal, followed by the group in 1956. (Note: The 144th Wing did not move until 1957.) On 7 July 1955, the 144th again became the 144th Fighter-Interceptor Group. With the F-86A, the 144th began standing dusk-to-dawn alerts, joining its active duty Air Defense Command (ADC) counterparts. ADC had organized its dispersed fighter squadrons into independent groups since 1953. Starting in 1956, Air National Guard units with air defense missions began following this model. On 24 August 1957, the 191st Squadron in Utah was assigned to the new 151st Fighter Group (Air Defense). On 19 April 1958, the 152nd Fighter Group (Air Defense) assumed command of the 192d Squadron in Nevada. The group, now with one squadron, was redesignated the 144th Fighter Group (Air Defense).

In April 1958, the group's remaining squadron, the 194th transitioned to the North American F-86L Sabre, which was designed from the onset as an all-weather interceptor. The F-86L was equipped with data link, which permitted interceptions to be controlled by Semi-Automatic Ground Environment direction centers.

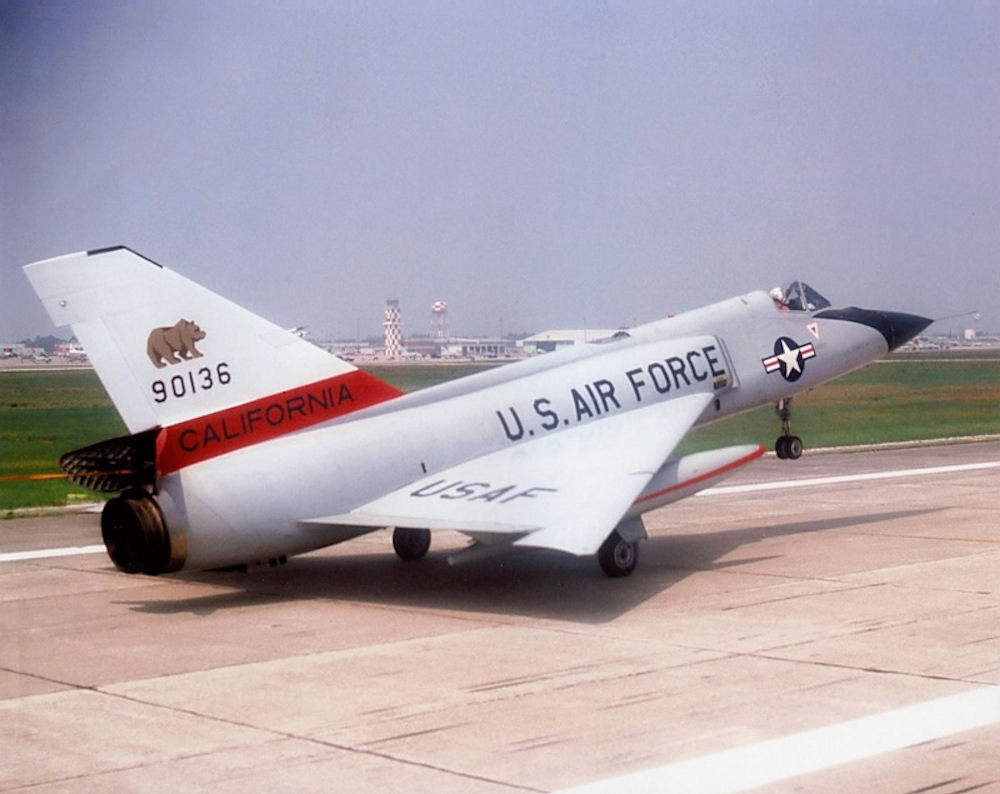
194th FIS F-106 Delta Dart, AF Ser. No. 59-0136

In July 1964, the group began flying the Convair F-102A Delta Dagger supersonic interceptor. On 25 July 1974, the 144th retired its last F-102 and brought the improved Convair F-106 Delta Dart into service. In the 1970s, the Air Force began to regard combat groups located on the same station as their parent wings as an additional layer of management. As a result, the group, which had returned to its earlier 144th Fighter-Interceptor Group designation in 1972, was inactivated on 9 July 1976 and the 194th Squadron was transferred directly to the 144th Wing.

==== Reactivation ====
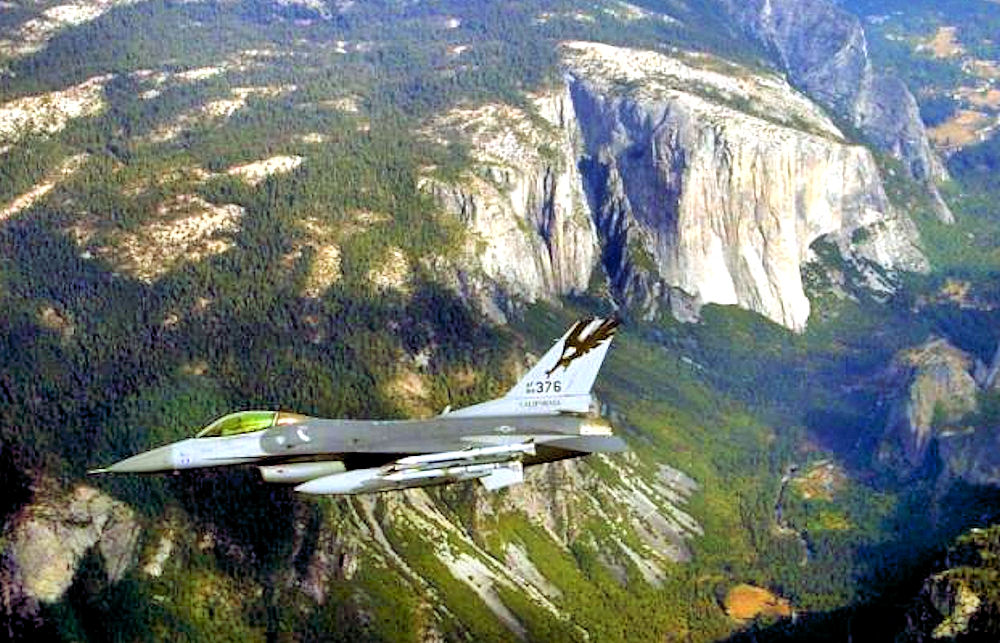
Group F-16 Fighting Falcon flying over the Sierra Nevada on an Operation Noble Eagle mission (Note: Aircraft is General Dynamics F-16C Block 25E Fighting Falcon, serial 84-1376, armed with AIM-120 missiles.)

Starting in 1992, the Air National Guard began reorganiing its units along the Operational Wing system adopted by the regular Air Force. The group was redesignated the 144th Operations Group and once again activated at Fresno. In 1995, the group transitioned to the more capable General Dynamics F-16C Fighting Falcon Block 25 aircraft. In addition to its home base, the group maintains a detachment on alert at March Air Reserve Base, California

The group was the busiest dedicated air defense group in the country during 1999, with deployments to eight countries and more than a half-dozen states. Fifty wing members deployed five F-16s to Naval Air Station Fallon, Nevada, to participate in the Navy's annual joint combat training exercise. Members of the unit also traveled to Tyndall Air Force Base, Florida for Combat Archer, which provided an opportunity for live fire weapons training. To top off the year, six dozen members and six aircraft deployed to Nellis Air Force Base, Nevada for Exercise Red Flag. During the opening minutes of the exercise, a 144th Fighter Wing four-ship flight executed simulated kills against four actual Mikoyan MiG-29s. These were the first-ever MiG-29 kills in a Red Flag exercise.

As the group's F-16C Block 25 aircraft came to the end of their operational lifespan, the 194th Fighter Squadron began to receive F-16C Block 32 aircraft in December 2006. All aircraft were replaced by the end of 2007.

The group started the conversion process to the McDonnell Douglas F-15C Eagle, transferred from the 120th Fighter Wing of the Montana Air National Guard in June 2013. The last F-16 departed the 144th Fighter Wing on 7 November 2013, destined for 162nd Fighter Wing of the Arizona Air National Guard. It was announced in 2023 that the 144th Fighter Wing would replace the F-15C Eagle with the updated Boeing F-15EX Eagle II.

== Lineage ==
- Constituted as the 372nd Fighter Group on 12 October 1943

Activated on 28 October 1943
Redesignated 372nd Fighter-Bomber Group 5 April 1944
Redesignated 372nd Fighter Group 5 June 1944
Inactivated on 7 November 1945
Redesignated 144th Fighter Group, Single Engine and allotted to California ANG on 24 May 1946
Activated and extended federal recognition on 2 June 1948
Redesignated 144th Fighter-Interceptor Group on 1 October 1952
Redesignated 144th Fighter-Bomber Group on 15 December 1952
Redesignated 144th Fighter-Interceptor Group on 1 July 1955
Redesignated 144th Fighter Group (Air Defense) c. 1 January 1958
Redesignated 144th Fighter-Interceptor Group c. 1 October 1972
Inactivated on 9 July 1976
Redesignated 144th Operations Group
Activated c. 1 January 1993

=== Assignments ===
- San Francisco Fighter Wing, 28 October 1943
- Seattle Fighter Wing, 7 December 1943
- III Fighter Command, 29 March 1944 – 7 November 1945
- 61st Fighter Wing, 2 June 1948
- 144th Fighter Wing (later 144th Fighter-Bomber Wing, 144th Fighter-Interceptor Wing, 144th Aur Defense Wing, 144th Fighter-Interceptor Wing), 1 November 1950 – 9 July 1976
- 144th Fighter Wing, c. 1 January 1993 – present

=== Components ===
- 407th Fighter Squadron (later 191st Fighter Squadron, 191st Fighter-Bomber Squadron, 191st Fighter-Interceptor Squadron): 15 October 1943 – 7 November 1945, 2 June 1948 – 1 July 1958
- 408th Fighter Squadron (later 192nd Fighter Squadron, 192nd Fighter-Bomber Squadron, 191nd Fighter-Interceptor Squadron): 15 October 1943 – 7 November 1945, 25 June 1948 – 19 April 1958
- 409th Fighter Squadron (later 194th Fighter Squadron, 194th Fighter-Bomber Squadron, 194th Fighter-Interceptor Squadron, 194th Fighter Squadron): 15 October 1943 – 7 November 1945, 2 June 1948 – 9 July 1976, c. 1 January 1993 – present

=== Stations ===
- Hamilton Field, California, 15 October 1943
- Portland Army Air Base, Oregon, 7 December 1943
- Esler Field, Louisiana, 25 March 1944
- Pollock Army Air Field, Louisiana, 15 April 1944
- Esler Field, Louisiana, 9 February 1945
- Alexandria Army Air Field, Louisiana, 14 September – 7 November 1945
- Naval Air Station Alameda, California, 2 June 1948
- Hayward Municipal Airport, California, 1949
- Fresno Air Terminal (later Fresno Air National Guard Base), California, April 1956

=== Aircraft ===
- Bell P-39 Airacobra, 1943–1944
- Curtiss P-40 Warhawk, 1944–1945
- North American P-51D (later F-51) Mustang, 1945, 1948-1954
- Ryan L-17 Navion, 1948-1954
- North American T-6 Texan, 1948-1954
- Douglas B-26 Invader, 1948-1954
- Douglas C-47 Skytrain, 1948-1954
- North American F-86A Sabre, 1954–1958
- North American F-86L Sabre, 1958–1964
- Convair F-102 Delta Dagger, 1965–1974
- Convair F-106 Delta Dart, 1974–1976
- General Dynamics F-16 Fighting Falcon, 1993–1995
- McDonnell Douglas F-15 Eagle, 2013–present
