= Christine Burckle =

Retired brigadier general and commander of Utah Air National Guard

Christine Burckle is a retired brigadier general and retired Commander and Assistant Adjutant General - Air of the Utah Air National Guard.

In August 2016, Willis was the Utah Air National Guard's first woman to achieve the rank of brigadier general.

== Early life and education ==
Burckle was born in Ohio and raised in Connecticut.

Burckle attended the University of North Carolina at Chapel Hill where she majored in mathematics.

== Military service ==
In 1988, Burckle received a commission as a 2nd Lieutenant through the Reserve Officer Training Corps at the University of North Carolina at Chapel Hill. Burckle intended to become a fighter pilot. However, her vision disqualified her. In lieu, she chose navigation and requested bombers. At the time, the US Army did not allow women to serve on combat bomber aircraft.

In 1996, she joined the Utah Air National Guard as a navigator for the KC-135 military aerial refueling aircraft, eventually logging more than 3000 hours in the aircraft. She deployed for operations Desert Storm, Desert Shield, Uphold Democracy, Joint Forge, Enduring Freedom, Allied Force and Operation Noble Eagle. At the Utah National Guard, she has served as the director of staff, the 151 Air Refueling Wing vice commander, comprising the 109th Air Control Squadron, the 130th Engineering Installation Squadron and the 151st Intelligence Surveillance Reconnaissance Group.

On August 6, 2016, Burckle assumed command of the Utah Air National Guard.
