= Robert C. Oaks =

US Air Force general

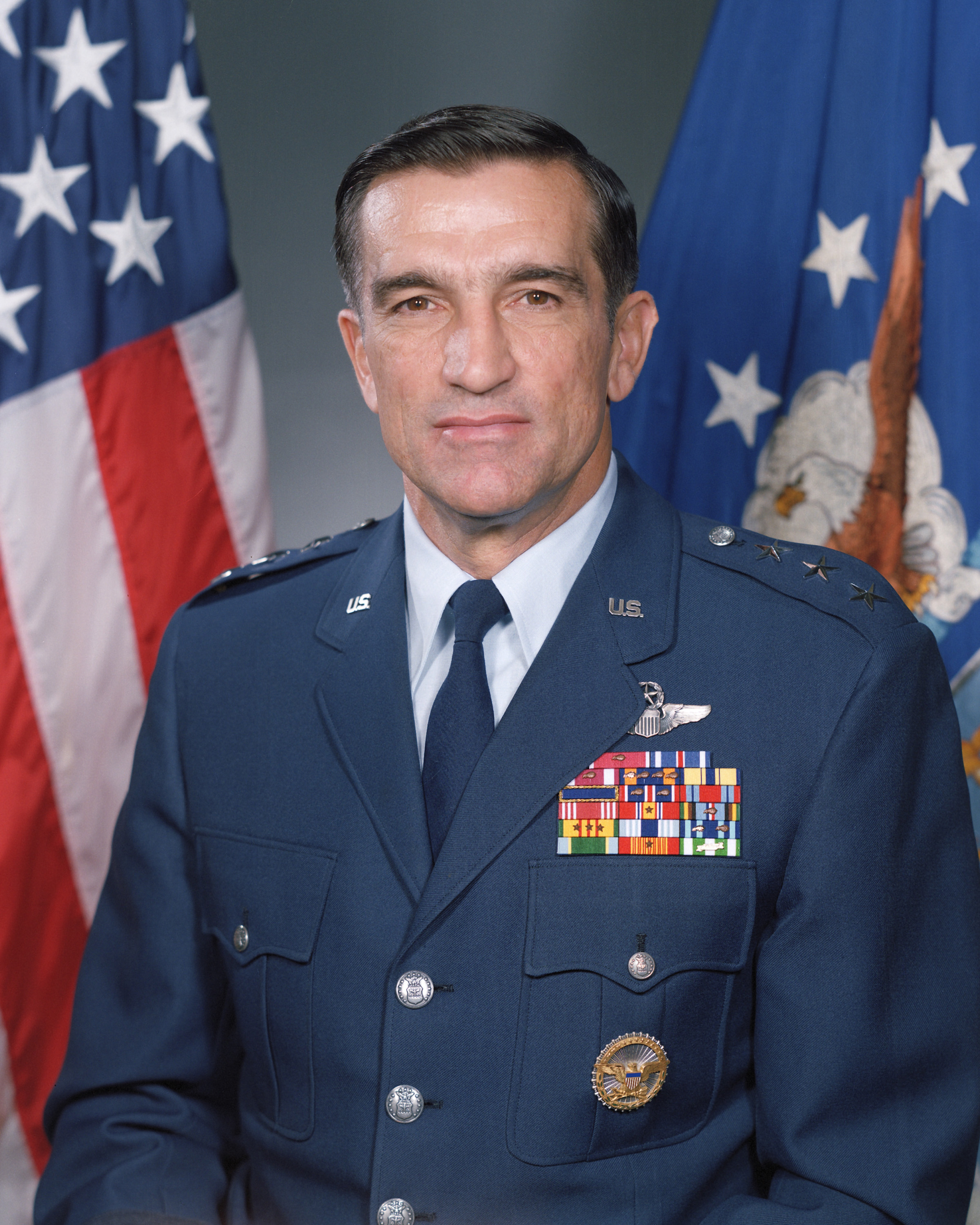
- Oaks as Lieutenant General, 1986

Second Quorum of the Seventy
- April 1, 2000 – October 3, 2009
- End reason: Honorably released

Presidency of the Seventy
- October 2, 2004 – August 1, 2007
- End reason: Honorably released

Military career
- 1959–1994
- Allegiance: United States of America
- Service/branch: United States Air Force
- Rank: General
- Commands held: U.S. Air Forces in Europe; Air Training Command
- Battles/wars: Vietnam War
- Awards: Defense Distinguished Service Medal; Air Force Distinguished Service Medal; Legion of Merit (2); Distinguished Flying Cross; Air Medal (9)

Personal details
- Born: February 14, 1936 (age 90); Los Angeles, California, United States
- Alma mater: U.S. Air Force Academy; Ohio State University; Naval War College
- Spouse(s): Gloria Mae Unger (m. 1959; died 2025)
- Parents: Charles and Ann Oaks

Robert Charles Oaks (born February 14, 1936) is a retired United States Air Force (USAF) general who served as commander of Air Training Command and United States Air Forces in Europe. Oaks was also a general authority of the Church of Jesus Christ of Latter-day Saints (LDS Church) from 2000 to 2009. He is a first cousin to LDS Church president Dallin H. Oaks.

== Background and education ==
Oaks was born on February 14, 1936, in Los Angeles, California to Charles and Ann Oaks. He grew up in Provo, Utah, where he graduated from Brigham Young High School in 1954. In 1959, Oaks was in the first class to graduate from the United States Air Force Academy in Colorado Springs, Colorado, receiving a bachelor's degree in Military Science. He earned a master's degree in business administration from Ohio State University in 1967 and graduated from the Naval War College in 1974.

He and his wife, Gloria, were married in the Salt Lake Temple and are the parents of six children. Gloria Oaks died in 2025.

== Military career ==
Upon completing pilot training, Oaks served as a fighter pilot during the Vietnam War, once being shot down over the Mekong Delta. His command positions included the 391st Tactical Fighter Squadron, Mountain Home Air Force Base, Idaho; 86th Tactical Fighter Wing, at Ramstein Air Base, West Germany; Allied Air Forces Southern Europe, in Naples, Italy; Air Training Command, Randolph AFB, Texas; and eventually, United States Air Forces in Europe (USAFE), Ramstein AB, Germany. He also held several key planning and personnel staff positions at headquarters USAF, The Pentagon, Washington, D.C., USAFE. The general was command pilot with more than 4,000 flying hours, including more than 300 combat hours. He retired as a four-star general and Commander in Chief, USAFE and Allied Air Force Central Europe (AAFCE) in 1994 after serving for 34 years.

The U.S. Secretary of Defense presented him with the Defense Distinguished Service Medal for "exceptionally distinguished performance of duty contributing to national security and the defense of the United States". He also received the Air Force Distinguished Service Medal for "exceptionally meritorious and distinguished service in a position of great responsibility to the Government of the United States culminating as commander of Air Training Command with headquarters at Randolph AFB, from 1990 to 1994".

== LDS Church service ==
In 2000, Oaks resigned from his Senior Vice President position at U.S. Airways when he was called to serve as a general authority and member of the LDS Church's Second Quorum of the Seventy. In this capacity, Oaks served as president of the church's Africa East Area. In 2004, he was called to Presidency of the Seventy, filling a vacancy created when Dieter F. Uchtdorf was called as a church apostle. In that capacity, Oaks oversaw the affairs of the church in the North America Central Area. He was released from the Presidency of the Seventy on August 1, 2007, and again served in the Second Quorum of the Seventy and as president of the Europe Area of the church. In 2008, he dedicated the newly renovated visitors center at the London England Temple on November 8, 2008. He was released as a general authority in 2009.

In 2011, Oaks was the keynote speaker at the 70th anniversary of the Utah Wing of the Civil Air Patrol, the official auxiliary of the USAF, at a memorial service at Hill Aerospace Museum Chapel.

== See also ==
- List of commanders of USAFE
