= Utah Air National Guard =

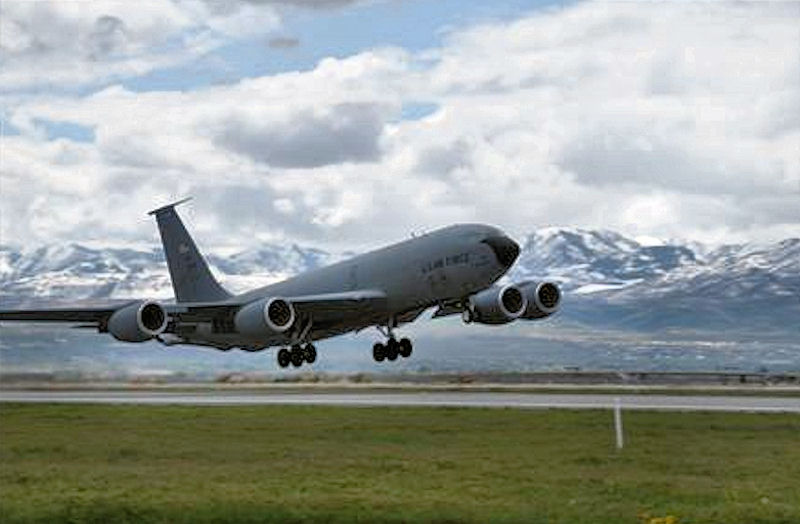
- A KC-135 of the 191st Air Refueling Squadron landing at Wright Air National Guard Base. The 191st ARS is the oldest unit in the Utah Air National Guard, having over 70 years of service to the state and nation.
- Active: 18 November 1946 – Present
- Country: United States
- Allegiance: Utah
- Branch: Air National Guard
- Type: State militia, military reserve force
- Role: "To meet state and federal mission responsibilities."
- Part of: Utah Department of Military Affairs; Utah National Guard; United States National Guard Bureau
- Garrison/HQ: Roland R. Wright Air National Guard Base
- Nickname: Mountain West Militia

Commanders
- Federal: President Donald Trump
- State: Governor Spencer Cox
- The Adjutant General: Maj Gen Daniel D. Boyack

Insignia
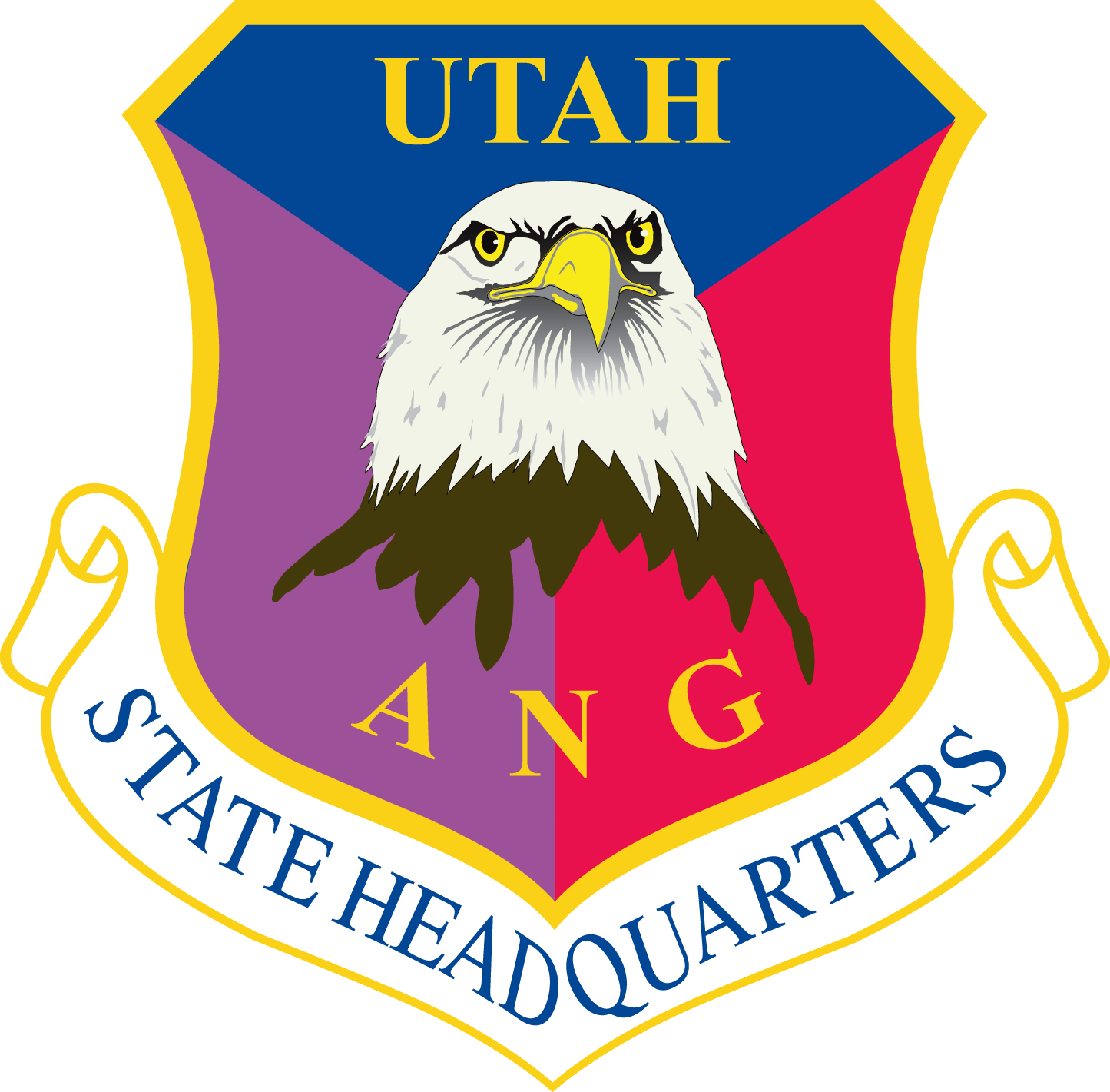
- Utah Air National Guard emblem

Aircraft flown
- Tanker: KC-135 Stratotanker

The Utah Air National Guard (UT ANG) is the aerial militia of the State of Utah, United States. It's a reserve of the United States Air Force and along with the Utah Army National Guard an element of the Utah National Guard of the larger United States National Guard Bureau.

As state militia units, the units in the Utah Air National Guard are not in the normal United States Air Force chain of command. They are under the jurisdiction of the governor of Utah through the office of the Utah Adjutant General unless they are federalized by order of the president of the United States. The Utah Air National Guard is headquartered in Salt Lake City. Maj Gen Daniel D. Boyack is the Commander for both the Utah Army and Air National Guard.

== Overview ==
Under the "Total Force" concept, Utah Air National Guard units are considered to be Air Reserve Components (ARC) of the United States Air Force (USAF). Utah ANG units are trained and equipped by the Air Force and are operationally gained by a major command of the USAF if federalized. In addition, the Utah Air National Guard forces are assigned to Air Expeditionary Forces and are subject to deployment tasking orders along with their active duty and Air Force Reserve counterparts in their assigned cycle deployment window.

Along with their federal reserve obligations, as state militia units the elements of the Utah ANG are subject to being activated by order of the governor to provide protection of life and property, and preserve peace, order and public safety. State missions include disaster relief in times of earthquakes, hurricanes, floods and forest fires, search and rescue, protection of vital public services, and support to civil defense.

The Utah Air National Guard is located on approximately 140 acres in the northeast corner of Salt Lake City International Airport. As of 2007 over 1,450 men and women serve in the Utah Air National Guard.

== Components ==
The Utah Air National Guard consists of the following major unit:

- 151st Wing

Established 18 November 1946 (as: 191st Fighter Squadron); operates: KC-135R Stratotanker
Stationed at: Roland R. Wright Air National Guard Base, Utah
Gained by: Air Mobility Command
The primary mission of the 151st Wing is to provide air refueling support to major commands of the United States Air Force, as well as other U.S. military forces and the military forces of allied nations. Additionally, the unit can support airlift missions. The unit is also tasked with supporting the nuclear strike missions of the Single Integrated Operational Plan.

Support Unit Functions and Capabilities:

- 109th Air Control Squadron

Stationed at: Roland R. Wright Air National Guard Base, Utah
The mission of the 109th is to operate and maintain radar and communication equipment necessary to manage and direct defensive and offensive air and battle management activities as a combat ready, integrated element of the Ground Theater Air Control System. They employ and administer reliable and secure command and control, data link, and voice communication networks necessary to meet worldwide contingency requirements.

- 130th Engineering Installation Squadron

Stationed at: Roland R. Wright Air National Guard Base, Utah
The 130th provides worldwide engineering, installation and relocation of command, control, communications, computers and intelligence systems.

- 151st Intelligence, Surveillance, and Reconnaissance Group

Stationed at: Roland R. Wright Air National Guard Base, Utah
This unit provides intelligence support necessary to plan, conduct, control and coordinate air operations.

== History ==
On 24 May 1946, the United States Army Air Forces, in response to dramatic postwar military budget cuts imposed by President Harry S. Truman, allocated inactive unit designations to the National Guard Bureau for the formation of an Air Force National Guard. These unit designations were allotted and transferred to various State National Guard bureaus to provide them unit designations to re-establish them as Air National Guard units.

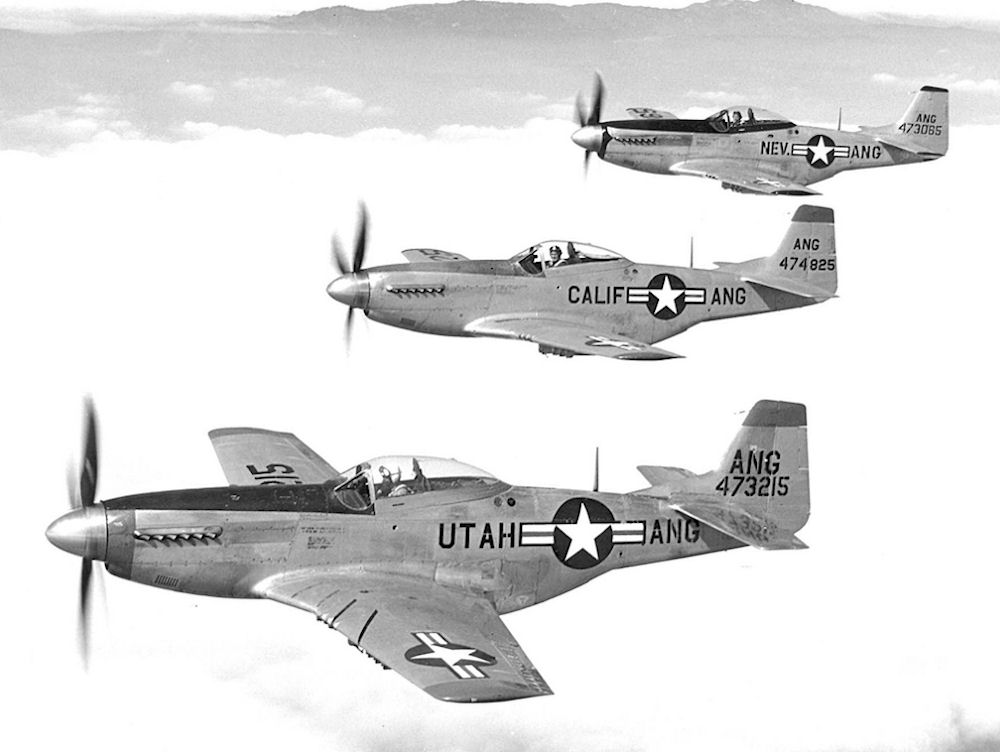
P-51D Mustangs of the Nevada, California and Utah Air National Guards fly in formation, 1948. The 191st Fighter Squadron was assigned to the CA ANG 61st Fighter Wing during the postwar years.

The Utah Air National Guard was founded on 18 November 1946 with the federal recognition of the 191st Fighter Squadron at Salt Lake City Municipal Airport. It was equipped with P-51D Mustangs and its mission was the air defense of the state. 18 September 1947, however, is considered the Utah Air National Guard's official birth concurrent with the establishment of the United States Air Force as a separate branch of the United States military under the National Security Act

Members of the Utah ANG were called to serve 21 months during the Korean War. Flying P-51D Mustang fighter aircraft, 10 pilots flew over 100 missions. Two Utah ANG pilots were killed in this conflict. One Utah Air National Guard pilot, Capt. Cliff Jolley, flying a North American F-86 Sabre, shot down seven soviet-made MiG-15 aircraft and became the first Air Guard "Ace" of the Korean War. During the Vietnam War, Utah Air Guard crews flew 6,600 hours of support missions for US forces. On 1 July 1958, the 191st Fighter-Interceptor Squadron was authorized to expand to a group level, and the 151st Fighter-Interceptor Group was established by the National Guard Bureau.

In 1990–91, Utah Air National Guard crews were some of the first to volunteer to support Operation Desert Shield and Operation Desert Storm during the 1991 Gulf War. Utah Air National Guard's support of this operation continued well into 1991.

In 1999, many members were deployed to Europe in support of Operation Allied Force. Members have also supported US drug interdiction activities and have provided air refueling for tactical and transportation aircraft supporting military activities involving Bosnia and Iraq. The Utah Air National Guard has participated in several Air Expeditionary Force (AEF) missions, most recently at Andersen Air Force Base, Guam in the summer of 2007.

Since 11 September 2001, over 3,300 Utah Air National Guard members have been activated and deployed for worldwide duty to include Operation Noble Eagle, Operation Enduring Freedom, and Operation Iraqi Freedom.

In Utah, local communities can have benefits from the Utah Air National Guard. Activities included "Sub-for-Santa", blood drives, "Adopt a School Program", highway cleanup and the 2002 Winter Olympics. The Utah Air National Guard also maintains a state of readiness to meet the needs to support the State of Utah during an earthquake, flood, civil disturbance or major disaster. Utah Air Guardsmen, at the request of the Governor, assisted during Hurricane Katrina and Hurricane Rita and airlifted evacuees to safety in September 2005.

== See also ==
- Utah State Defense Force
- Utah Wing Civil Air Patrol
