= 191st Air Refueling Squadron =

Utah Air National guard unit

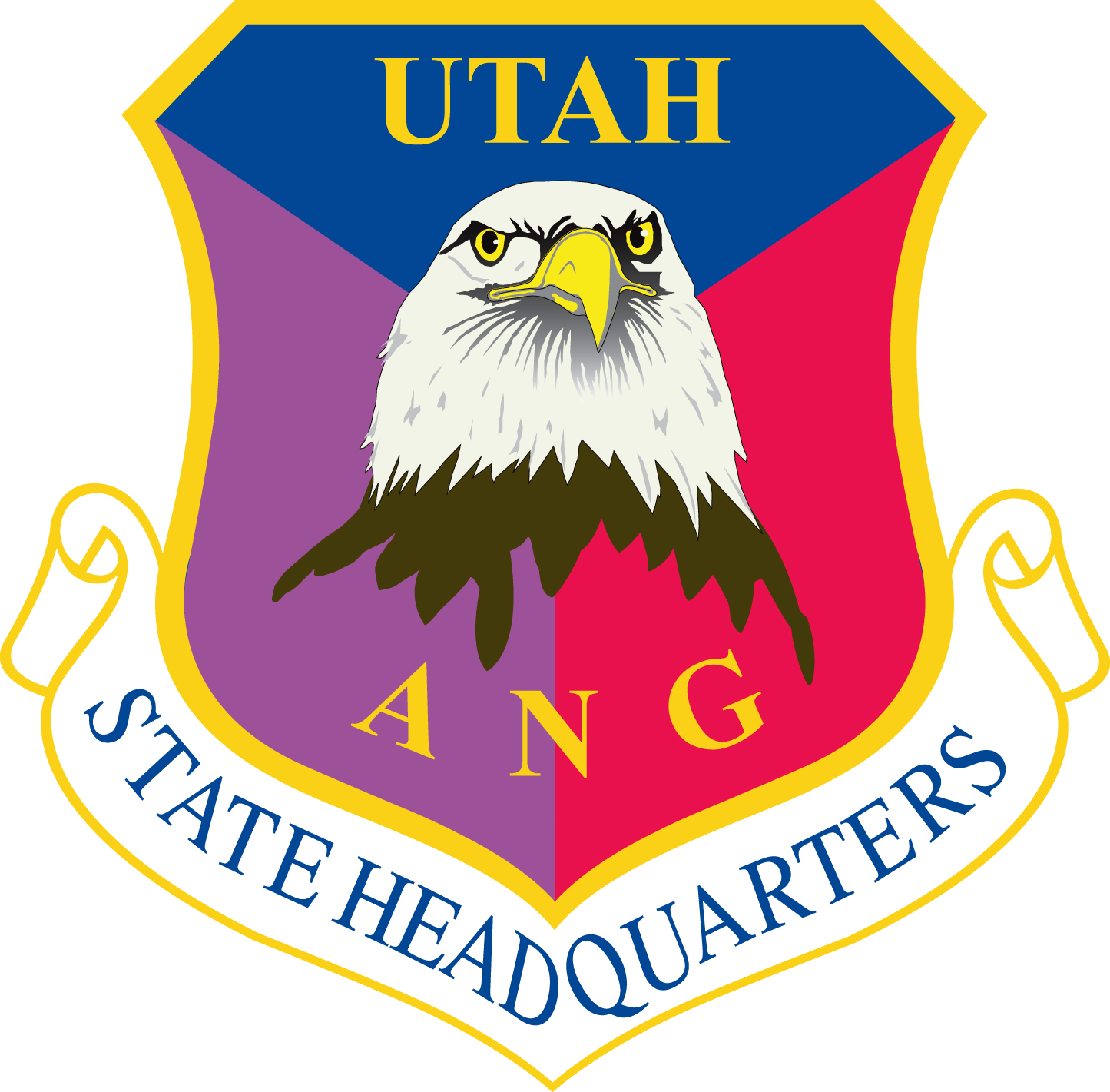
191st Air Refueling Squadron

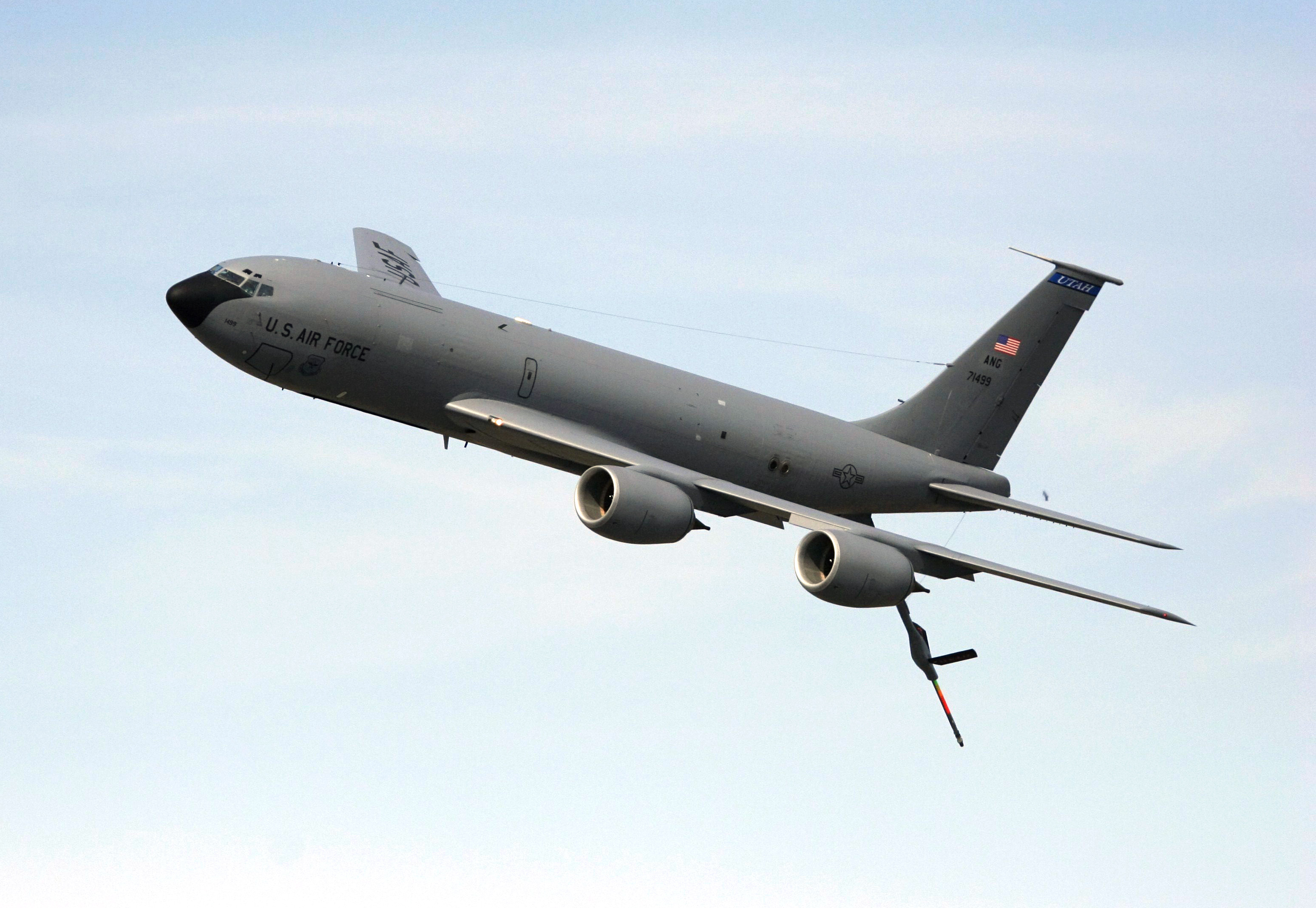
- KC-135R Stratotanker, 191st Air Refueling Squadron
- Active: 1943–1945; 1946–1952; 1952–1972; 1972–present
- Country: United States
- Allegiance: Utah
- Branch: Air National Guard
- Type: Squadron
- Role: Aerial refueling
- Part of: Utah Air National Guard
- Garrison/HQ: Roland R. Wright National Guard Base, Salt Lake City, Utah
- Nicknames: Salty Guard; Ruddy Ducks

Insignia
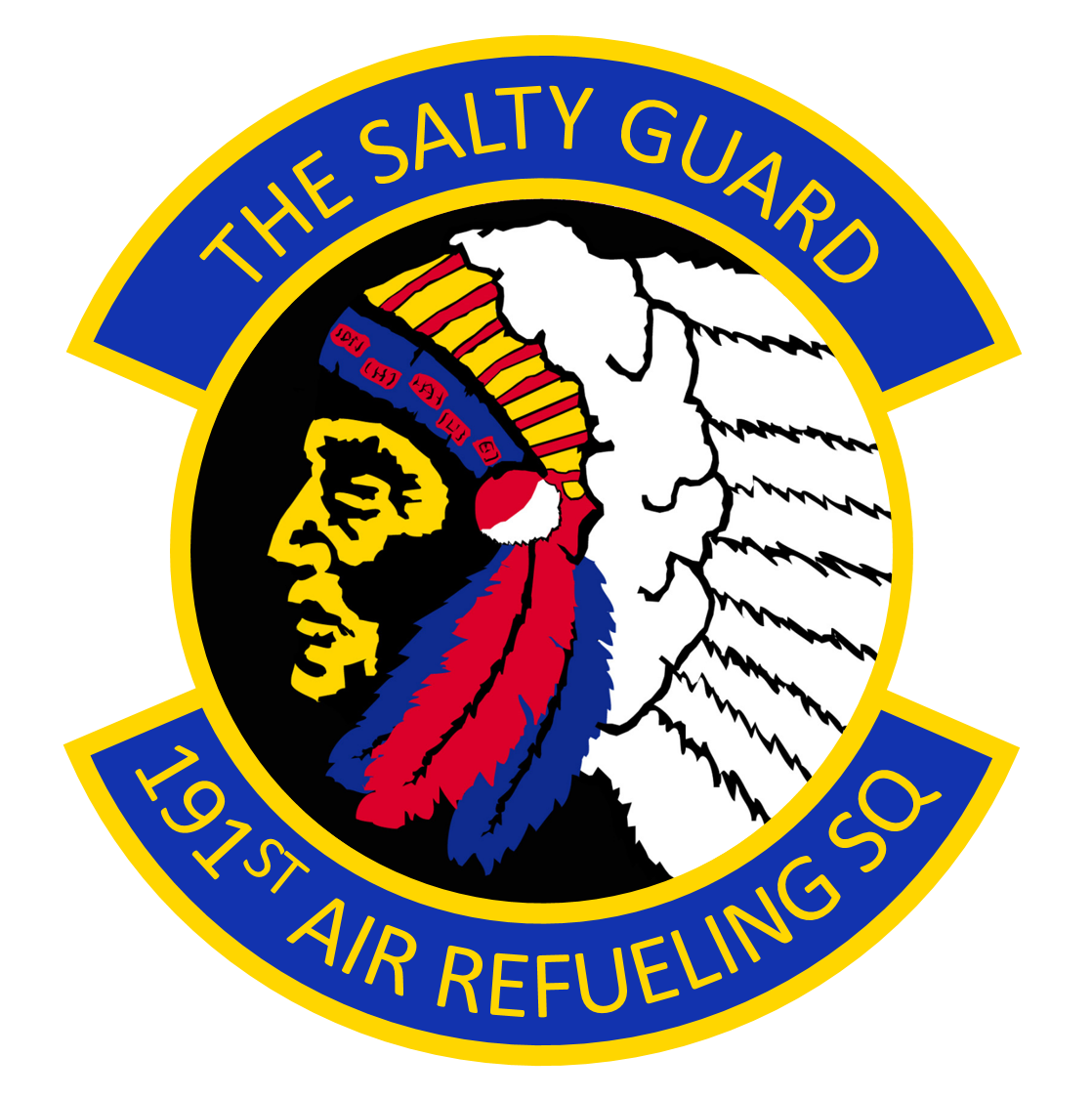
- 191st Air Refueling Squadron emblem
- Tail stripe: White block "UTAH" on blue background

The 191st Air Refueling Squadron is a unit of the Utah Air National Guard 151st Air Refueling Wing located at Roland R. Wright Air National Guard Base, Utah. The 191st is equipped with the KC-135R Stratotanker.

== History ==
=== World War II ===
Activated in October 1943 as the 407th Fighter Squadron at Hamilton Field, California. During World War II, the squadron was an Operational Training Unit (OTU), equipped with second-line P-39 Airacobras and P-40 Warhawks. Its mission was to train newly graduated pilots from Training Command in combat tactics and maneuvers before being assigned to their permanent combat unit. Initially assigned to IV Fighter Command, then transferred to III Fighter Command in 1944, being re-equipped with P-51D Mustangs. It took part in air-ground maneuvers and demonstrations, participating in the Louisiana Maneuvers in the summer of 1944 and in similar activities in the US until after V-J Day.

Inactivated in November 1945.

=== Utah Air National Guard ===
The wartime 407th Fighter Squadron was re-activated and re-designated as the 191st Fighter Squadron, and was allotted to the Utah Air National Guard, on 24 May 1946. It was organized at Salt Lake City Municipal Airport, Utah and was extended federal recognition on 18 November 1946 by the National Guard Bureau. The 191st Fighter Squadron was entitled to the history, honors, and colors of the 407th Fighter Squadron. The squadron was equipped with P-51D Mustangs and was assigned to the Colorado Air National Guard 140th Fighter Group, although it was operationally under the control of the Utah Air National Guard at Salt Lake City. During its early years with the F-51D, the unit earned prominence as one of the Air Force's most respected aerial gunnery competitors.

==== Korean War activation ====
As a result of the Korean War, the 191st Fighter Squadron was federalized and brought to active duty on 1 April 1951 and assigned to the 140th Fighter Wing. The unit was ordered to the new Clovis Air Force Base, New Mexico, which arrived in October 1951. The federalized 140th was a composite organization of activated Air National Guard units, composed of the 191st, the 187th Fighter Squadron (Wyoming ANG) and the 120th Fighter Squadron (Colorado ANG). The 140th and its components were equipped with F-51D Mustangs, and were redesignated as fighter-bomber squadrons on 12 April 1951.

During their period of federal service, many pilots were sent to Japan and South Korea to reinforce active duty units, 10 pilots flew over 100 missions, and two Utah pilots were killed in this war. One Utah ANG pilot, Capt. Clifford Jolley, flying a North American F-86 Sabre, shot down seven soviet made MIG-15 aircraft and became the first Air Guard ace of the Korean War.

At Clovis, elements of the 140th took part in Operation Tumbler-Snapper – 1952, a nuclear bomb test in Nevada. On 15 November 1952, the elements of the 140th returned to Air National Guard control in their respective states.

==== Cold War ====
Upon return to Utah state control, the 191st was again equipped with F-51D Mustangs. On 1 June 1955 it was redesignated the 191st Fighter-Interceptor Squadron, and received its first jet aircraft, the F-86A Sabre which it used as a day-only interceptor for the air defense of Utah.

On 1 July 1958, the 191st was authorized to expand to a group level, and the 151st Fighter Group was established by the National Guard Bureau. The 191st becoming the group's flying squadron. Other elements assigned into the group were the 151st headquarters, 151st Material Squadron (maintenance and supply), 151st Air Base Squadron, and the 151st USAF Dispensary.

Also, in 1958, the 191st implemented the ADC runway alert program, in which interceptors of the 191st Fighter-Interceptor Squadron were committed to a five-minute runway alert. The F-86s were replaced by the F-86L Sabre Interceptor, a day/night/all-weather aircraft designed to be integrated into the ADC SAGE interceptor direction and control system.

==== Transport mission ====
On 1 April 1961, the 191st mobilization gaining command was transferred from Air Defense Command to the Military Air Transport Service, and re-equipped with C-97 Stratofreighter. The 191st Air Transport Squadron expanded its military airlift role to worldwide mission capabilities. Entering the realm of Southeast Asia and the Vietnam War, the Utah Air National Guard flew its first mission into the Southeast Asia theater combat zone in late 1964, and continued to do so throughout the Vietnam War years. In January 1966, the unit became the 151st Military Airlift Group (151 MAG), under the Military Airlift Command. In 1969, the C-97s were retired and replaced by the C-124C Globemaster II. During the Vietnam War, Utah Air Guard crews flew 6,600 hours of support missions for American forces.

==== Air Refueling ====
The 191st mobilization gaining command becane Strategic Air Command (SAC) on 1 July 1972 and it was equipped with second-line KC-97L Stratotankers. In 1978, the squadron received KC-135A Stratotankers; a newer and faster jet tanker. In January 1979 the unit began the 24-hour-per-day SAC alert commitment. This commitment would be maintained for the next 12 years until President George Bush ended the SAC Alert Force in 1991.

The 1980s found the squadron involved in many training exercises as well as "real World" flying missions. In 1982 the unit converted to a newer version model aircraft—the KC-135E. In April 1983 the 191st Air Refueling Squadron was involved in the first Pacific Tanker Task Force, with flights to Guam, South Korea and Australia. Spring of 1984 brought a very large "first" for the 1191st Air Refueling Squadron. The unit participated in Coronet Giant, an exercise which entailed a direct flight from the United States to West Germany by 12, A-10 Thunderbolt II attack fighters, refueled along the way by three KC-135's from the 191st The route spanned 3600 miles, and was the largest mission of this type ever undertaken by a guard force.

During Operation Desert Shield, the squadron received orders for a partial activation on 20 December 1990. All aircraft, aircrews and a number of support personnel were dispatched to the newest forward operating base at Cairo West Airport, Egypt on 27–29 December 1990. They became the basis for the 1706th Air Refueling Wing (Provisional). Other unit personnel were mobilized for use as stateside "backfill" (replacing troops sent forward) or sent to overseas destinations.

On 30 April 1999, the 191st was tasked for a Presidential Reserve Call Up due to the crisis in Kosovo. President William Clinton authorized the call up of 33,000 reserve personnel for up to 270 days. The 191st deployed to Europe to support Operation Allied Force.

==== Global War on Terrorism ====
Following the September 11 attacks on the United States the squadron was tasked to provide aerial refueling support for the countless fighter combat air patrols performed over major U.S. cities. Dubbed Operation Noble Eagle. The 191st flew its first Noble Eagle mission on 12 September 2001. The highest sortie production occurred in November when fighter combat air patrols occurred every four hours over most of the major U.S. cities.

In addition to supporting Noble Eagle, the 191st also provided support for Operation Enduring Freedom, deploying aircraft and personnel to Spain to support combat air operations from late Sep 2001 until the spring of 2002.

At home, local communities see many benefits from the Utah ANG. Many opportunities exist to meet legitimate military training needs while serving the community. Activities include Sub-for-Santa, Blood Drives, highway cleanup, and the 2002 Winter Olympics. The Utah ANG also maintains a state of readiness should Utah need support during an earthquake, flood, civil disturbance, or major disaster, and was involved in assisting evacuees in the aftermath of hurricanes Katrina and Rita.

=== Lineage ===
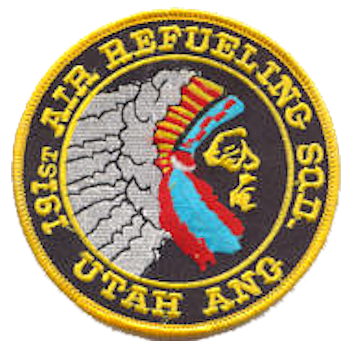
191st Air Refueling Squadron – Legacy Emblem

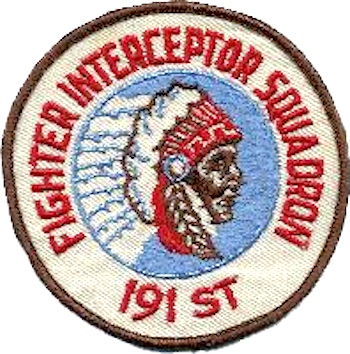
Legacy 191st Fighter-Interceptor Squadron Emblem

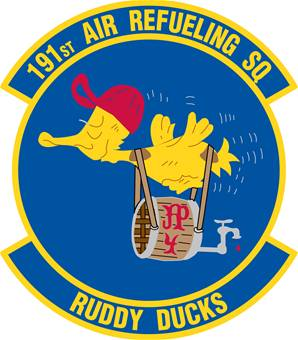
Historic Emblem of 191st ARS

191st Military Airlift Squadron

- Constituted as the 407th Fighter Squadron on 12 October 1943

Activated on 15 October 1943
Redesignated 407th Fighter-Bomber Squadron on 5 April 1944
Redesignated 407th Fighter Squadron on 5 June 1944
Inactivated on 7 November 1945
Redesignated 191st Fighter Squadron, Single Engine and allotted to the National Guard on 24 May 1946
Extended federal recognition on 18 November 1946
Federalized and placed on active duty on 1 April 1951
Redesignated 191st Fighter-Bomber Squadron on 14 May 1951
Inactivated, released from active duty and returned to Utah state control on 1 January 1953
Activated on 1 January 1953
Redesignated 191st Fighter-Interceptor Squadron on 1 June 1955
Redesignated 191st Air Transport Squadron, Heavy on 1 April 1961
Redesignated 191st Military Airlift Squadron on 8 January 1966
Inactivated on 19 October 1972
Consolidated with the 191st Air Refueling Squadron on 17 August 1987

191st Air Refueling Squadron

- Constituted as the 191st Air Refueling Squadron on 30 May 1972

Activated on 20 October 1972
Redesignated 191st Air Refueling Squadron, Heavy on 1 April 1978
Consolidated with the 191st Military Airlift Squadron on 17 August 1987
Redesignated 191st Air Refueling Squadron on 16 March 1992

=== Assignments ===
- 372d Fighter Group, 1 July 1943 – 7 November 1945
- 144th Fighter Group, 18 November 1946
- 140th Fighter-Bomber Group, 12 April 1951
- 144th Fighter Group, 1 July 1955
- 151st Fighter Group (later 151st Air Transport Group, 151st Military Airlift Group), 1 July 1958 – 19 October 1972
- 151st Air Refueling Group, 20 October 1972
- 151st Operations Group, 1 October 1995 – present

=== Stations ===
- Westover Field, Massachusetts, 1 July 1943
- Groton Army Air Field, Connecticut, 19 October 1943
- Bradley Field, Connecticut, 5–20 January 1944
- RAF Aldermaston (AAF-467), England, 12 February 1944
- RAF Andover (AAF-406), England, 29 February – 19 July 1944
- Cardonville Airfield (A-3), France, 24 July 1944
- La Vieille Airfield (A-19), France, 15 August 1944
- Lonray Airfield (A-45), France, 6 September 1944
- Roye-Amy Airfield (A-73), France, 11 September 1944
- Florennes/Juzaine Airfield (A-78), Belgium 26 September 1944
- Ophoven Airfield (Y-32), Belgium 27 January 1945
- Gütersloh Airfield (Y-99), Germany 20 April 1945
- AAF Station Mannheim/Sandhofen, Germany. 27 June 1945
- AAF Station Fritzlar, Germany, 6 August–September 1945
- Camp Myles Standish, Massachusetts, c. 6–7 November 1945
- Salt Lake City Municipal Airport, 18 November 1946
- Clovis Air Force Base, New Mexico, 12 April 1951
- Salt Lake City Municipal Airport (Later Salt Lake City International) Airport, 1 January 1953 – 19 October 1972
- Salt Lake City International Airport (later Salt Lake City Air National Guard Base, Roland R. Wright Air National Guard Base, 20 October 1972 – present

=== Aircraft ===
- P-39 Airacobra, 1943–1944
- P-40 Warhawk, 1944–1945
- P-51D (later F-51D) Mustang, 1945, 1946–1953, 1953–1955
- F-86A Sabre, 1955–1958
- F-86L Sabre, 1958–1961
- C-97 Stratofreighter, 1961–1969
- C-124C Globemaster II, 1969–1972
- KC-97L Stratotanker, 1972–1978
- KC-135A Stratotanker, 1978–1982
- KC-135E Stratotanker, 1982–2006
- KC-135R Stratotanker, 2006–present
