= Utah State Defense Force =

- The shoulder patch worn by Utah State Guard soldiers during World War II.
- Active: 1903 - Current
- Country: United States
- Allegiance: Utah
- Type: State defense force
- Role: Military reserve force

Commanders
- Civilian leadership: Governor of Utah

The Utah State Defense Force (USDF), formerly known as the Utah State Guard, is the currently unorganized state defense force of the state of Utah. The USDF, along with the Utah National Guard, is part of the organized militia of Utah. However, unlike the National Guard, the State Defense Force is by law solely under the command of the Governor of Utah and cannot be federalized or deployed outside the borders of Utah. Although inactive, Utah's State Defense Force Act allows the Governor to reactivate the USDF through executive action.

== History ==
The first militia in Utah was the Nauvoo Legion which was composed of volunteers from the Church of Jesus Christ of Latter-day Saints. This unit served as the primary militia for the state of Utah until it was dissolved by the Edmunds-Tucker Act. After the passage of the Militia Act of 1903 which created the modern National Guard of the United States, states who lost their National Guard units due to federalization in times of war were forced to recruit their own replacement units, leading to the birth of the modern state defense force. During World War II, the Utah State Guard was organized to replace the Utah National Guard, and consisted of approximately 600 members who were responsible for protecting National Guard armories and other state facilities. The Utah State Guard was tasked with recovering debris from fire balloon attacks launched by Japan which had landed in Utah.

The Utah State Guard was reactivated in 1981. However, due to various issues, including a concern that white supremacists had infiltrated the ranks, the Utah State Guard was reorganized in 1997 by General John L. Matthews, the Adjutant General of Utah, as a cadre of around thirty officers who would be tasked with securing National Guard armories during federal deployments. At this time, the Utah State Guard was also renamed the Utah State Defense Force.

=== Current status ===
An attempt was made to disband the Utah State Defense Force in 2001 by Neal Hendrickson, but it failed to pass committee.

As of 2022, Title 39 of the Utah Code still allows the governor of Utah to organize and maintain the force. A 2022 bill (H.B. 360) passed both chambers of the state legislature which recodified Title 39 to Title 39A, made technical changes, and clarified that the force is not subject to federal activation.

== Legal basis ==
State defense forces are authorized by the federal government under Title 32, Section 109 of the United States Code. Nearly half of all U.S. states, as well as the territory of Puerto Rico, actively maintain these forces. Under state law, the Utah State Defense Force Act allows the governor to organize and maintain the Utah State Defense Force, making a reactivation of the USDF possible by either an act of legislature or by an executive order by the Governor of Utah.

== See also ==
- Naval militia
- United States Coast Guard Auxiliary
- Utah Wing Civil Air Patrol
