= Michael Van Wagenen =

American filmmaker, author, and university professor

Michael Van Wagenen is a documentary filmmaker. He was a professor at the University of Texas at Brownsville and currently teaches at Georgia Southern University. He created the Public history certificate and concentration at GSU.

== Biography ==
Michael Scott Van Wagenen attended Brigham Young University and graduated in 1992 with his bachelor's degree. He later attended the University of Texas at Brownsville and received his master's in 1999. Wagenen attended the University of Utah, and earned his Ph.D. in U.S. History in 2009. He was married to filmmaker Monica Delgado.

Wagenen became a documentary filmmaker, and some of his documentaries have won awards. He has done several documentaries on the United States and Mexico borderlands. These documentaries have received awards from the National Educational Media Network. His documentary Mundo Milagroso was awarded the Gold Apple from the National Educational Film and Video Festival in 1996. They have also been shown at the Smithsonian National Museum of Natural History.

Wagenen was the author of The Texas Republic and the Mormon Kingdom of God which was published in 2002. Wagenen spoke at a session of the Mormon History Association's 49th annual conference in 2014. He discussed themes of Mormonism in Texas, relating to this book. He also wrote the book Remembering the Forgotten War: The Enduring Legacies of the U.S.-Mexican War which was published in 2012. He also collaborated on the book Between Pulpit and Pew: The Supernatural World in Mormon History and Folklore.

Wagnenen was also a professor of history at the University of Texas in Brownsville, Texas. Wagenen continued his teaching career at Georgia Southern University. He has been the assistant professor and public history coordinator there since 2012. He founded the Public History certificate program at Georgia Southern.

He has received grants from the Charles Redd Center for Western Studies at Brigham Young University, Daughters of the Republic of Texas, and Clements Center for Southwest Studies at Southern Methodist University. He also received a grant from 2010 to 2012 from the National Park Service.

Van Wagenen is the father of New York Times bestselling author Maya Van Wagenen. He is the unnamed “dad” who appears throughout her award-winning memoir, Popular: Vintage Wisdom for a Modern Geek.

== Selected filmography ==
- Telling Our Story
- Arte y Color
- Vatos Locos
- The History of the 38th Street Gang
- Folk Healing Practices in the Latino Immigrant Community
- Beauty Before Me
- North Africa 1944 (1990)
- Der Vetter (1991)
- The Candy Bomber (1992)
- The Attack on Fort Stevens (1993)
- Utah on the Home Front (1993)
- Navajo Weavers (1994)
- Fedora (1994)
- The Magic Bracelet (1994)
- Big Foot: The Search For Sasquatch (1994)
- Mundo Milagroso (1995)
- Piana (1996)
- Spirit Doctors (1996)
- The History of Yellowstone Park (1997)
- Yellowstone: America's Eden (1997)
- A Day With Sheriff Joe (1997)
- Low and Slow (1997)
- Grandma Vera's Tortillas (1999)
