= 61st Fighter Wing =

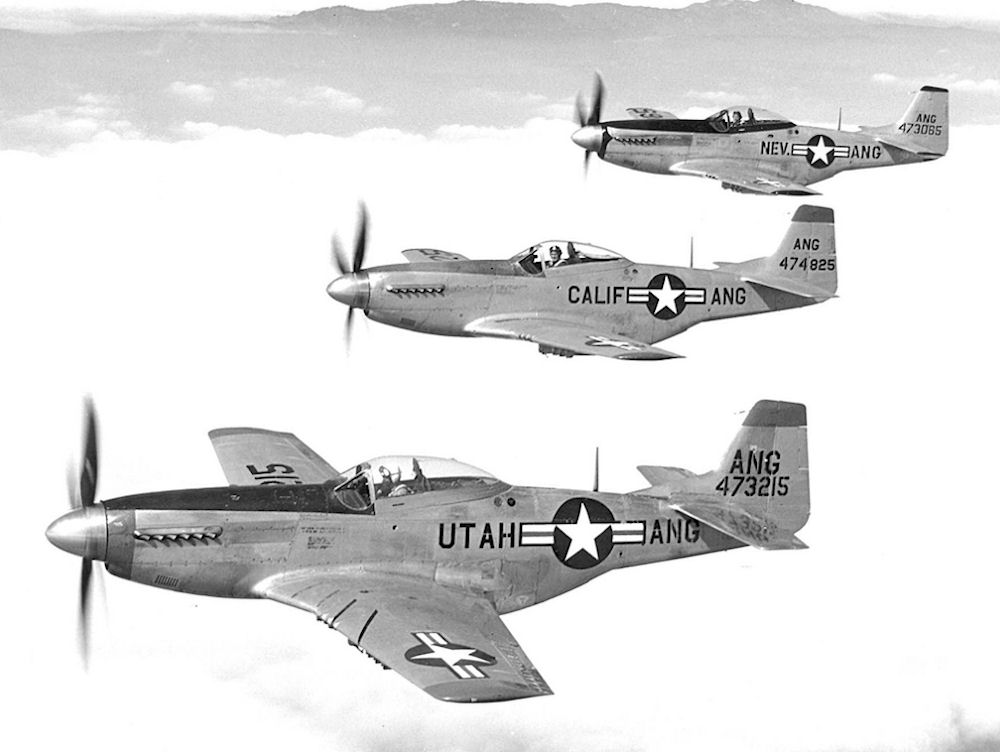
- F-51s of the Nevada, California and Utah Air National Guards, all part of the 61st Fighter Wing
- Active: 1943-1945; 1946-1950
- Country: United States
- Branch: United States Air Force
- Type: Wing
- Role: Command and Control
- Part of: California Air National Guard
- Engagements: World War II

The 61st Fighter Wing (61 FW) is a disbanded unit of the United States Air Force, last stationed at Hayward Municipal Airport, Hayward, California. It was withdrawn from the California Air National Guard (CA ANG) and inactivated on 31 October 1950.

This wing is not related to the 61st Troop Carrier Wing, Medium, or subsequent units that was constituted and activated on 1 July 1948.

== History ==
=== World War II ===
The wing was a World War II command and control organization for Army Air Bases training replacement personnel being assigned to troop carrier groups and glider units in the overseas combat theaters. Inactivated at the end of the war.

=== Air National Guard ===
Allocated to the California Air National Guard for command and control origination for units in the Western Region (Northern California, Nevada, Utah) of the United States. Extended federal recognition and activated on 4 April 1948

At the end of October 1950, the Air National Guard converted to the wing-base (Hobson Plan) organization. As a result, the wing was withdrawn from the California ANG and was inactivated on 31 October 1950. The 144th Fighter Wing was established by the National Guard Bureau, allocated to the state of California, recognized and activated 1 November 1950; assuming the personnel, equipment and mission of the inactivated 61st Fighter Wing.

=== Lineage ===
- Constituted as 61st Fighter Wing on 5 June 1943

Activated on 13 June 1943
Inactivated on 4 October 1945

- Allotted to the California ANG on 24 May 1946

Extended federal recognition and activated on 4 April 1948
Inactivated, and returned to the control of the Department of the Air Force, on 31 October 1950

- Disbanded on 15 June 1983

=== Assignments ===
- I Troop Carrier Command, 13 June 1943 – 4 October 1945
- California Air National Guard, 4 April 1948 – 31 October 1950

=== Components ===
- 144th Fighter Group, 2 June 1948 – 31 October 1950

=== Stations ===
- Pope Field, North Carolina, 13 June 1943
- Sedalia Army Airfield, Missouri, July 1943-4 October 1945
- Hayward Municipal Airport, Hayward, California, 4 April 1948 – 31 October 1950
