= Utah Wing Civil Air Patrol =

- Utah Wing of Civil Air Patrol

Associated branches
- United States Air Force

Command staff
- Commander: Col Andreas Wesemann
- Deputy Commander: Lt Col Nicholas Cook
- Chief of Staff: Lt Col Stephen Holmes

Current statistics
- Cadets: 459
- Seniors: 389
- Total Membership: 848
- Website: utwg.cap.gov
- Statistics as of January 2025

The Utah Wing of the Civil Air Patrol (CAP) is the statewide level of the national organization Civil Air Patrol in the state of Utah. Its headquarters is located in Salt Lake City, Utah. As of 2024, Utah Wing consists of over 830 cadet and adult members in 14 locations across the state of Utah.

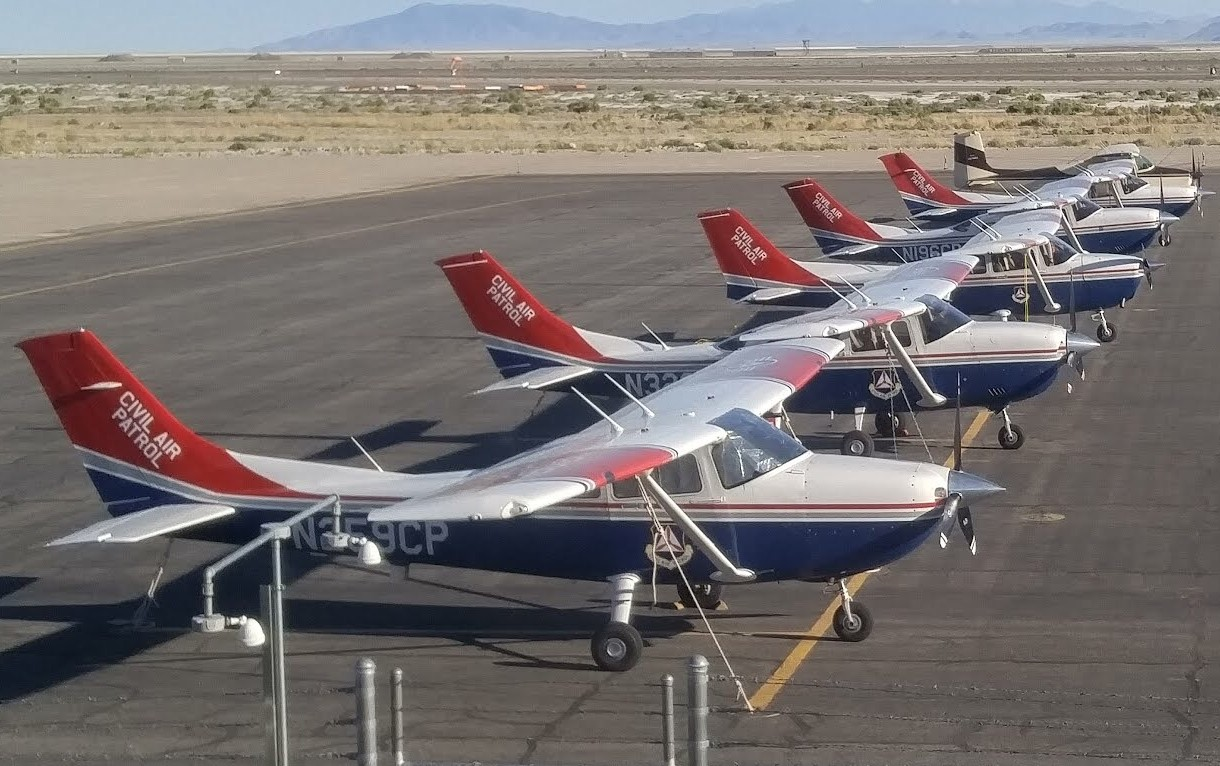
Civil Air Patrol Utah Wing aircraft at Wendover Airport, Utah

== Mission ==
The Utah Wing supports the three primary missions of the Civil Air Patrol for both Civil Air Patrol members and the general public: Emergency Services, Cadet Programs, and Aerospace Education.

=== Counter-drug ===
CAP joined the war on drugs in 1986 when, according to congressional authorization, it signed an agreement with the U.S. Air Force and U.S. Customs Service allowing CAP resources to help stem the flow of drugs into and throughout the United States.

=== Cadet programs ===
Thousands of young people are introduced to aviation through CAP's cadet program. The program allows young people to progress through a 16-step program including aerospace, education, leadership training, physical fitness, and moral leadership. Cadets compete for academic scholarships to further their studies in fields such as engineering, science, aircraft mechanics, aerospace medicine, meteorology, as well as many others. Cadets who earn cadet officer status may enter the Air Force as an E3 (airman first class) rather than an E1 (airman basic).

In support of cadet training, the Utah Wing conducts a cadet basic encampment semiannually. Encampment is the initial special cadet activity that serves as a gateway for further progress in the training program. Instruction topics include the history and customs of the U.S. Air Force, core values, and career exploration in aviation and STEM careers. The 2020 summer encampment series was named Desert Hawk XVIII and the encampment has been held at Wendover Airfield, Utah, for over a decade. The winter encampment series in 2019 was known as Southern Arch III and was held in Mesquite, Nevada, from December 26-31, 2019.

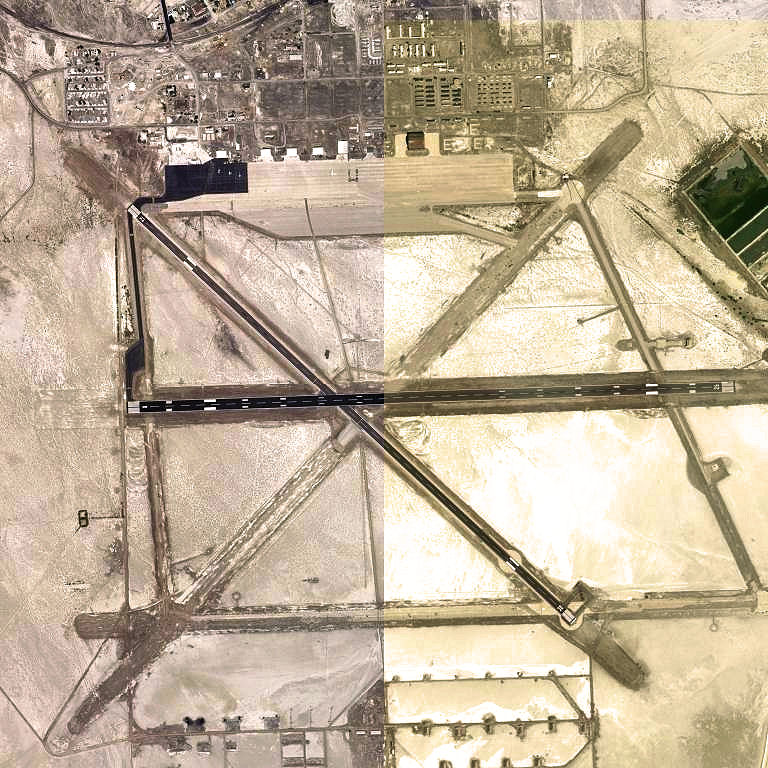
Wendover Airfield, Utah (ICAO: KENV)

Each year, cadets have the opportunity to participate in special activities at the local, state, regional, or national level. Many cadets have the opportunity to solo fly in an airplane for the first time through a flight camping or academy, while others travel abroad through the International Air Cadet Exchange Program. Cadets also assist at major air shows throughout the United States.

=== Aerospace education ===
CAP's aerospace education efforts focus on two different audiences: volunteer CAP members and the general public. The programs ensure that all CAP members (seniors and cadets) have an appreciation for and knowledge of aerospace issues. Members are required to participate in the educational program to advance within the organization. Materials are provided by aerospace educators at CAP's National Headquarters at Maxwell Air Force Base in Montgomery, Alabama, United States

In addition to internal aerospace education, the CAP's external aerospace programs are conducted through the national educational system. The CAP sponsors numerous workshops every year in states all throughout the country, reaching hundreds of teachers and consequently thousands of students. These workshops highlight basic aerospace knowledge and focus on advances in aerospace technology. CAP's aerospace education members receive more than 20 free aerospace education classroom materials.

The internal aerospace education program is divided into cadet and senior programs. Cadets complete aerospace education as one of the requirements to progress through the achievement levels of the cadet program, while Senior members have a responsibility to become knowledgeable of aerospace issues and the aerospace education program that CAP provides. They are further encouraged to share the information obtained with their local communities and school systems.

== Organization ==
Squadrons of the Utah Wing
Designation	Squadron Name	Location	Notes
UT-007	Salt Lake City Senior Squadron	Salt Lake City	
UT-017	Castle Valley Composite Squadron	Price	
UT-024	St George Composite Squadron	Saint George	
UT-027	Weber Minuteman Composite Squadron	Layton	
UT-048	Phoenix Cadet Squadron	Taylorsville	
UT-049	Cache Valley Composite Squadron	Logan	
UT-053	Sevier Valley Cadet Squadron	Richfield	
UT-067	Thunderbird Cadet Squadron	Salt Lake City	
UT-051	Cedar Mustangs Composite Squadron	Cedar City	
UT-080	Blackhawk Cadet Squadron	Draper	
UT-083	Phantom Composite Squadron	Provo	
UT-117	Uintah Wilderness Cadet Squadron	Vernal	
UT-801	UMA Cadet Squadron, Black Widows	Riverdale	
UT-802	UMA Cadet Squadron, Diamondbacks	Lehi	

== See also ==
- Awards and decorations of the Civil Air Patrol
- Utah Air National Guard
- Utah State Defense Force
