= 151st Wing =

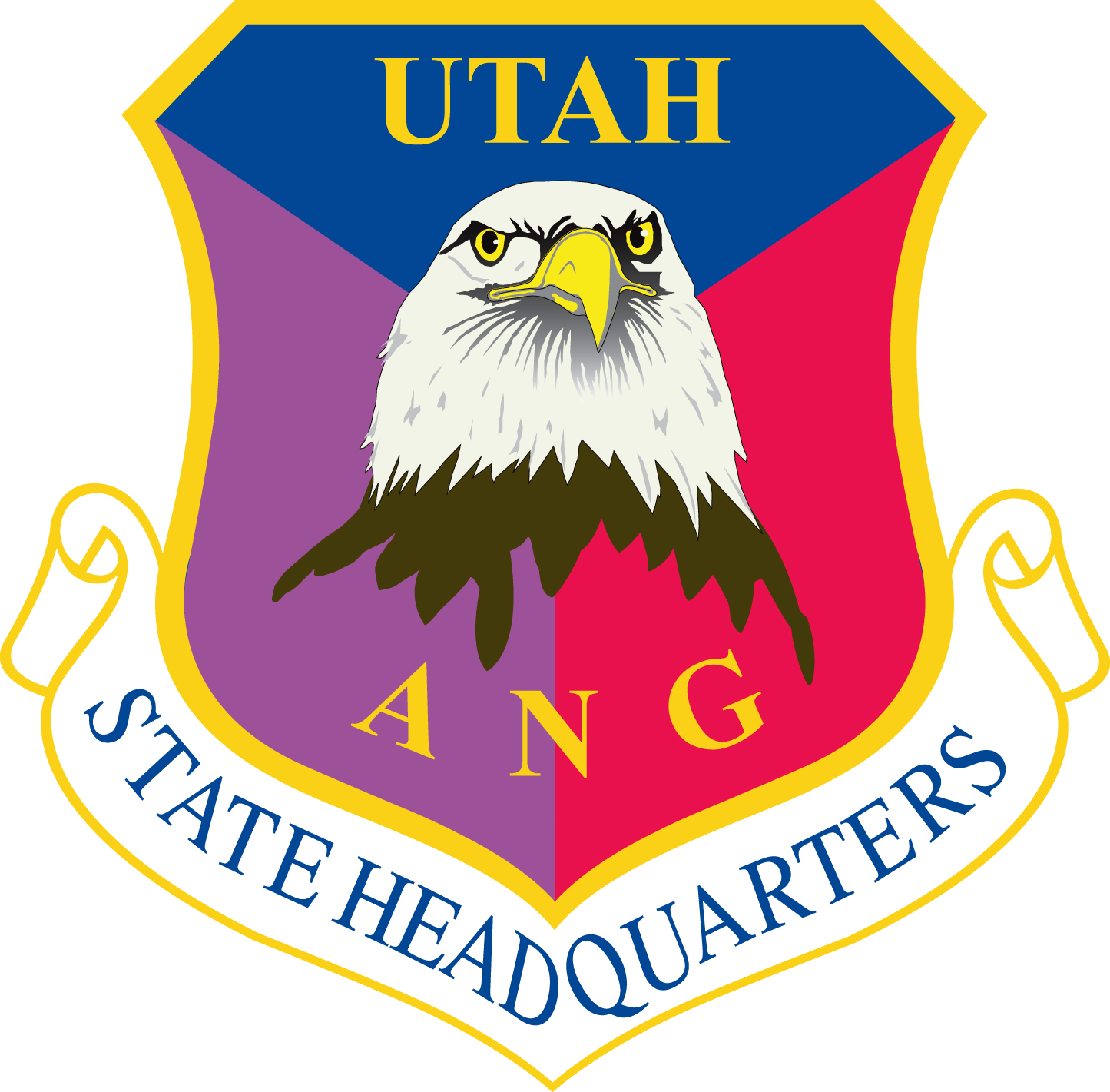
151st Wing

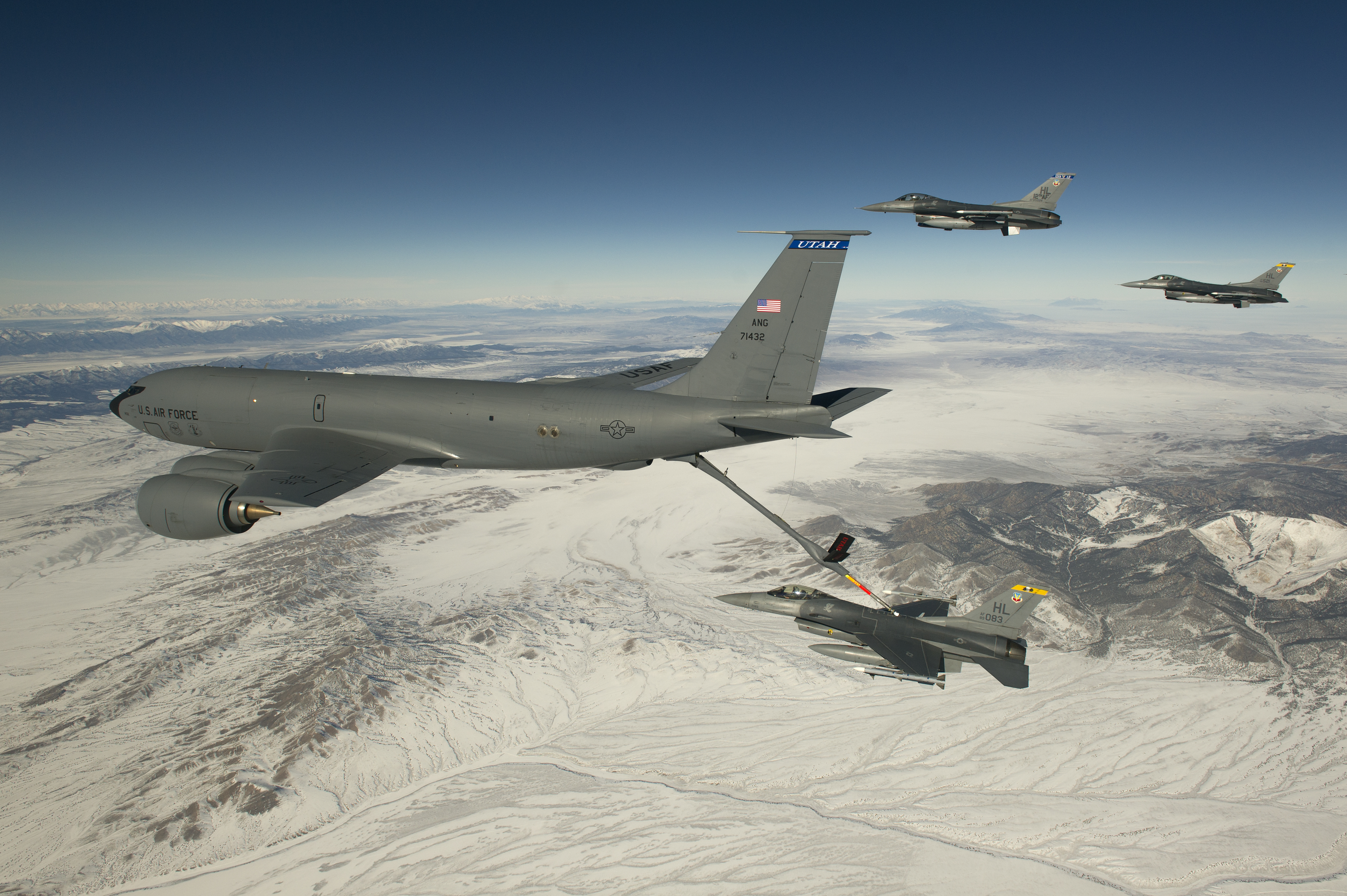
- 151st Air Refueling Wing Boeing KC-135R Stratotanker 57-1432
- Active: 1957-1972; 1972–present
- Country: United States
- Allegiance: Utah
- Branch: Air National Guard
- Type: Wing
- Role: Aerial refueling
- Part of: Utah Air National Guard
- Garrison/HQ: Roland R. Wright Air National Guard Base, Salt Lake City, Utah
- Nicknames: Salty Guard, Ruddy Ducks

Commanders
- Commander: Col Jeffrey A. Gould

Insignia
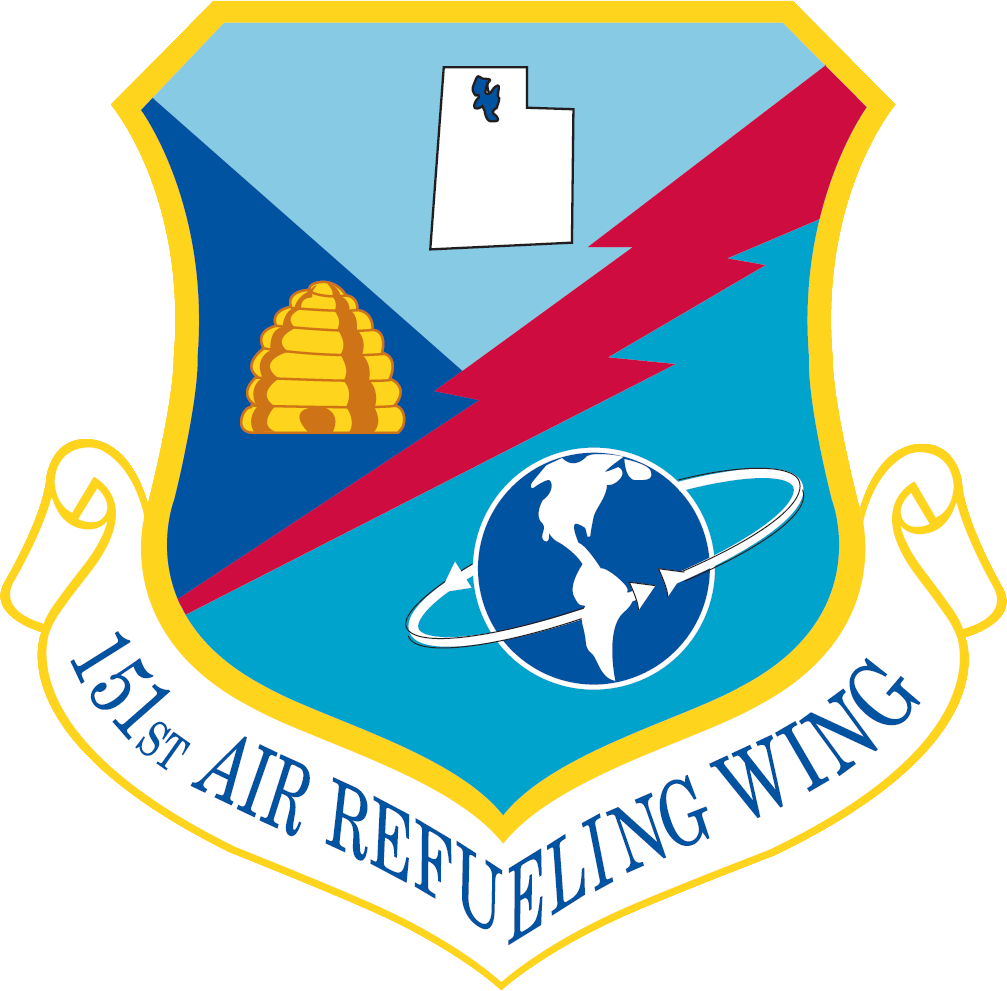
- 151st Air Refueling Wing emblem
- Tail stripe: Red block "UTAH" on black background

Aircraft flown
- Tanker: KC-135R Stratotanker

The 151st Wing is a unit of the Utah Air National Guard, stationed at Roland R. Wright Air National Guard Base, Utah. If activated to federal service, the Wing is gained by the United States Air Force Air Mobility Command.

== Mission ==
The primary mission of the 151st Wing is to provide air refueling support to major commands of the United States Air Force, as well as other U.S. military forces and the military forces of allied nations. Additionally, the unit can support airlift missions. The unit is also tasked with supporting the nuclear strike missions of the Single Integrated Operational Plan.

== Units ==
- 151st Operations Group

191st Air Refueling Squadron

- 151st Maintenance Group
- 151st Mission Support Group
- 151st Medical Group
- 151st Intelligence Surveillance and Reconnaissance Group

== History ==
On 1 July 1958, the Utah Air National Guard 191st Fighter-Interceptor Squadron was authorized to expand to a group level, and the 151st Fighter Group (Air Defense) was established by the National Guard Bureau. The 191st FIS becoming the group's flying squadron. Other squadrons assigned into the group were the 151st Headquarters, 151st Material Squadron (Maintenance and Supply), 151st Combat Support Squadron, and the 1151st USAF Dispensary. The group was gained by the Air Defense Command 29th Air Division.

In 1958, the 151st implemented the ADC Runway Alert Program, in which interceptors of the 191st Fighter-Interceptor Squadron were committed to a five-minute runway alert. Its existing F-86A day interceptors were replaced by the North American F-86L Sabre, a day/night/all-weather aircraft designed to be integrated into the ADC SAGE interceptor direction and control system.

=== Transport mission ===
On 1 April 1961, the 151st was transferred from Air Defense Command to the Military Air Transport Service, and re-equipped with C-97 Stratofreighter. The 151st Air Transport Group expanded its military airlift role to worldwide mission capabilities. Entering the realm of Southeast Asia and the Vietnam War, the Utah Air National Guard flew its first mission into the Southeast Asia theater combat zone in late 1964, and continued to do so throughout the Vietnam War years. In January 1966, the unit became the 151st Military Airlift Group, under the Military Airlift Command. In 1969, the C-97s were retired and replaced by the C-124C Globemaster II. During the Vietnam War, Utah Air Guard crews flew 6,600 hours of support missions for American forces.

=== Air Refueling ===
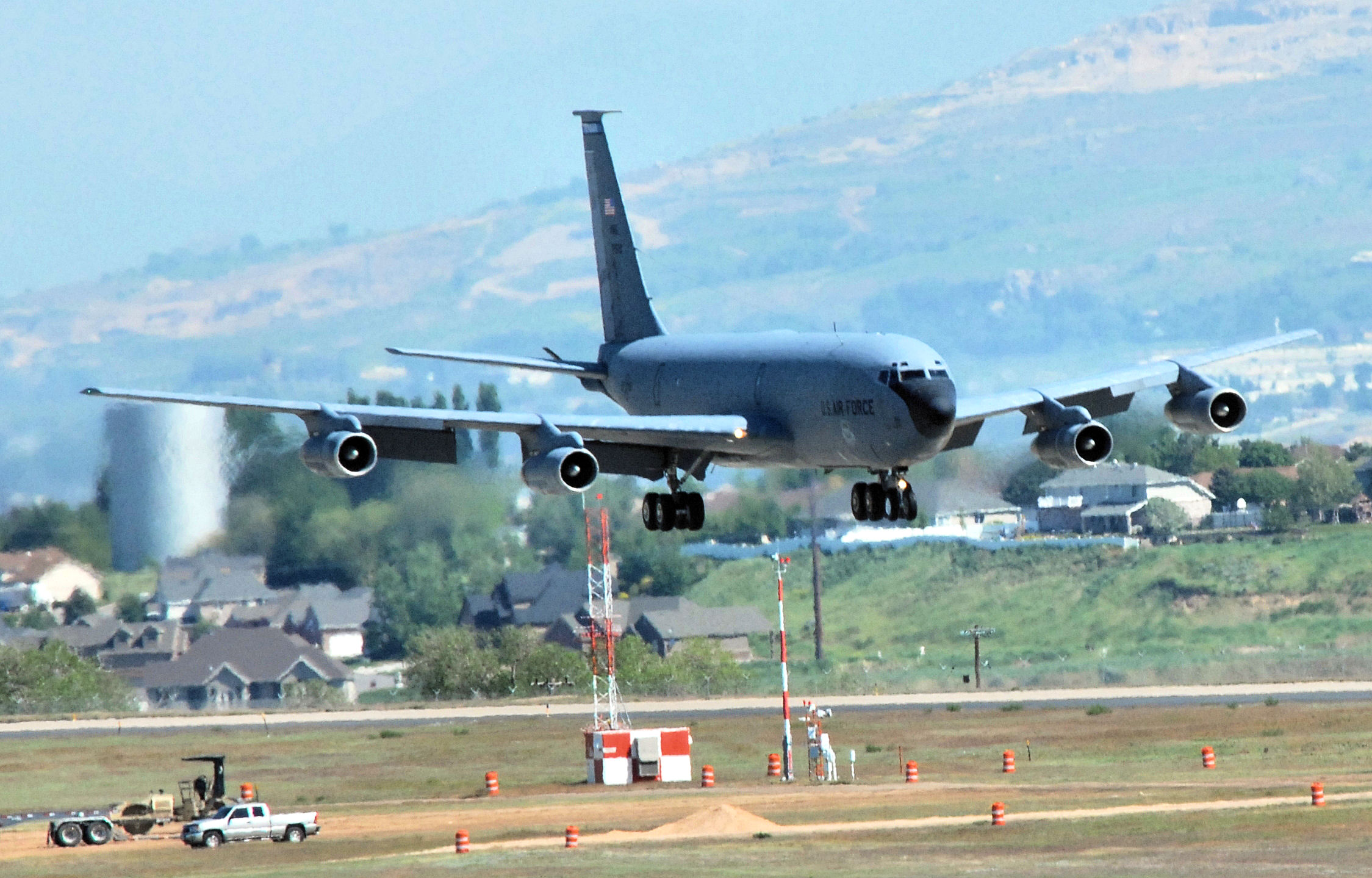
The 151st ARW's final KC-135E 57-1510 arrives at Hill Air Force Base for display, 2009

The 151st Military Airlift Group was transferred to Strategic Air Command (SAC) on 1 July 1972 and was equipped with second-line KC-97L Stratotankers. In 1978, the squadron received KC-135A Stratotankers; a newer and faster jet tanker. In January 1979 the unit began the 24-hour-per-day Strategic Air Command (SAC) alert commitment. This commitment would be maintained for the next 12 years until President George Bush ended the SAC Alert Force in 1991.

The 1980s found the squadron involved in many training exercises as well as "real world" flying missions. In 1982 the unit converted to a newer version model aircraft—the KC-135E. In April 1983 the 191st Air Refueling Squadron was involved in the first Pacific Tanker Task Force, with flights to Guam, South Korea and Australia. Spring of 1984 brought a very large "first" for the 1191st Air Refueling Squadron. The unit participated in Coronet Giant, an exercise which entailed a direct flight from the United States to West Germany by 12, A-10 Thunderbolt II attack fighters, refueled along the way by three KC-135's from the 191st The route spanned 3600 miles, and was the largest mission of this type ever undertaken by a Guard force.

During Operation Desert Shield, the squadron received orders for a partial activation on 20 December 1990. All aircraft, aircrews and a number of support personnel were dispatched to the newest forward operating base at Cairo West Airport, Egypt on 27–29 December 1990. They became the basis for the 1706th Air Refueling Wing (Provisional). Other unit personnel were mobilized for use as stateside "backfill" (replacing troops sent forward) or sent to overseas destinations.

On 30 April 1999, the 151st was tasked for a Presidential Reserve Call Up due to the crisis in Kosovo. President William Clinton authorized the call up of 33,000 reserve personnel for up to 270 days. The 191st deployed to Europe to support Operation Allied Force.

=== Global War on Terrorism ===
Following the terrorist's attacks on the United States the squadron was tasked to provide aerial refueling support for the countless fighter combat air patrols performed over major U.S. cities. Dubbed Operation Noble Eagle, the 191st flew their first mission on 12 September 2001. The highest sortie production occurred in November when fighter combat air patrols occurred every four hours over most of the major U.S. cities.

In addition to supporting ONE, the 191st also provided support for Operation Enduring Freedom, deploying aircraft and personnel to Spain to support combat air operations from late Sep 2001 until the spring of 2002.

At home, local communities see many benefits from the Utah ANG. Many opportunities exist to meet legitimate military training needs while serving the community. Activities include Sub-for-Santa, Blood Drives, highway cleanup, and the 2002 Winter Olympics. The Utah ANG also maintains a state of readiness should Utah need support during an earthquake, flood, civil disturbance, or major disaster, and was involved in assisting evacuees in the aftermath of hurricanes Katrina and Rita.

On 2 December 2023, the wing was redesignated as the 151st Wing, citing an expanded role encompassing additional responsibilities beyond its aerial refueling mission.

== Lineage ==
- Established as the 151st Fighter Group (Air Defense) and allotted to the Air National Guard in 1957

Extended federal recognition and activated on 24 August 1957
Redesignated 151st Air Transport Group, Heavy on 1 April 1961
Redesignated 151st Military Airlift Group on 1 January 1966
Inactivated on 19 October 1972
Consolidated with the 151st Air Refueling Group on 17 August 1987

Established as the 151st Air Refueling Group on 30 May 1972 and alotted to the National Guard Bureau
Activated on 20 October 1972
Redesignated 151st Air Refueling Group, Heavy on 1 April 1978
Consolidated with the 151st Military Airlift Group on 17 August 1987
Redesignated 151st Air Refueling Group c. 16 March 1992
Redesignated 151st Air Refueling Wing on 1 October 1995
Redesignated 151st Wing on 2 December 2023

=== Assignments ===
- 144th Air Defense Wing, 24 August 1957
- 140th Air Defense Wing, 30 June 1958
- 144th Air Defense Wing, 1 January 1960
- 146th Air Transport Wing (later 146th Military Airlift Wing), 1 April 1961
- 137th Military Airlift Wing, 1 September 1969 – 19 October 1972
- 126th Air Refueling Wing, 20 October 1972
- 141st Air Refueling Wing, 1 July 1976
- Utah Air National Guard, 16 October 1995 – present

Gained by: 29th Air Division, Air Defense Command
Gained by: Western Transport Air Force, Air Transport Command, 1 April 1961
Gained by: Twenty-Second Air Force, Military Airlift Command, 8 January 1966
Gained by: Strategic Air Command, 1 July 1972
Gained by: Air Combat Command, 1 June 1992
Gained by: Air Mobility Command, 1 June 1993 – present

=== Components ===
- 151st Operations Group, 1 October 1995 – present
- 191st Fighter-Interceptor Squadron (later 191t Air Transport Squadron, 191st Military Airlift Squadron, 191st Air Refueling Squadron), 24 August 1957 – 19 October 1972, 20 October 1972 – 1 October 1995

=== Stations ===
- Salt Lake City Municipal Airport (Later Salt Lake City International Airport), 24 August 1957 – 19 October 1972, 20 October 1972 – present

Designated: Salt Lake City Air National Guard Base, 1991-Present
Designated: Wright Air National Guard Base, 18 November 2014

=== Aircraft ===
- F-86L Sabre Interceptor, 1958-1961
- C-97 Stratofreighter, 1961-1969
- C-124C Globemaster II, 1969-1972
- KC-97L Stratotanker, 1972-1978
- KC-135A Stratotanker, 1978-1982
- KC-135E Stratotanker, 1982-2006
- KC-135R Stratotanker, 2006–Present

=== Notable members ===
- Jake Garn, pilot until 1979, mayor of Salt Lake City, astronaut, and senator
