= Utah National Guard =

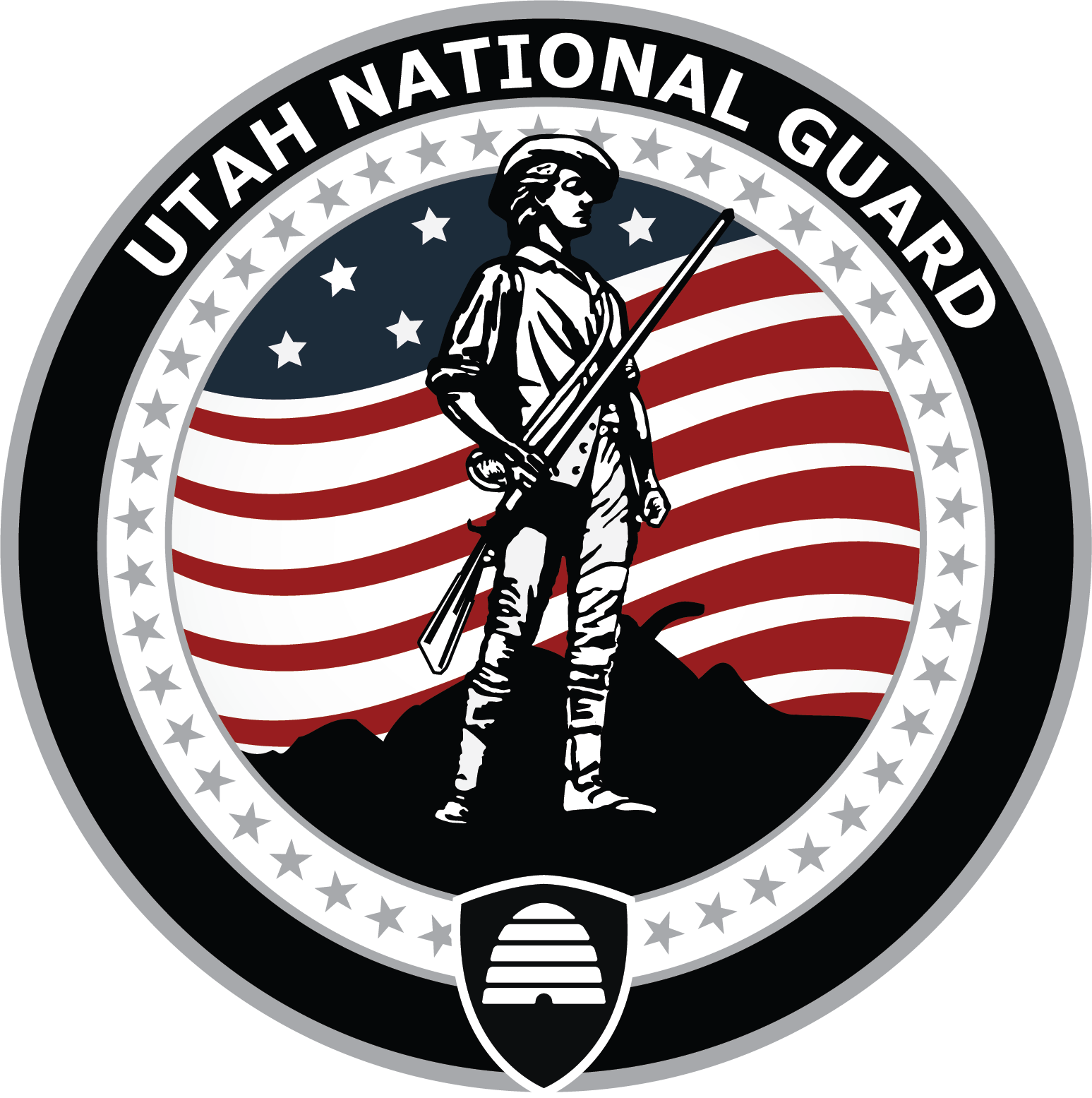
- Active: 1894-present
- Country: United States
- Allegiance: United States; Utah
- Branch: United States Army; United States Air Force; National Guard
- Role: Federal Reserve Force; State Militia (Militia Act of 1903)
- Size: 7600+ Personnel
- Engagements: Utah Territory: American Civil War; United States: World War I; World War II
- Website: https://guard.utah.gov

Commanders
- Donald J. Trump: President of the United States (Federalized)
- Spencer J. Cox: Governor of Utah
- Major General Daniel D. Boyack: Adjutant General

The Utah National Guard (UNTG) is part of the National Guard of the United States, a dual federal-state military reserve force in the state of Utah. It is headquartered at Joint Force Headquarters, Draper, Utah. At the call of the governor, the Utah National Guard will mobilize and deploy during times of state emergency to augment local jurisdictions and responders in their efforts to protect lives and property. The Utah National Guard is also subject to the call of the president of the United States to serve as part of the total U.S. Military force.

The Utah National Guard consists of the:

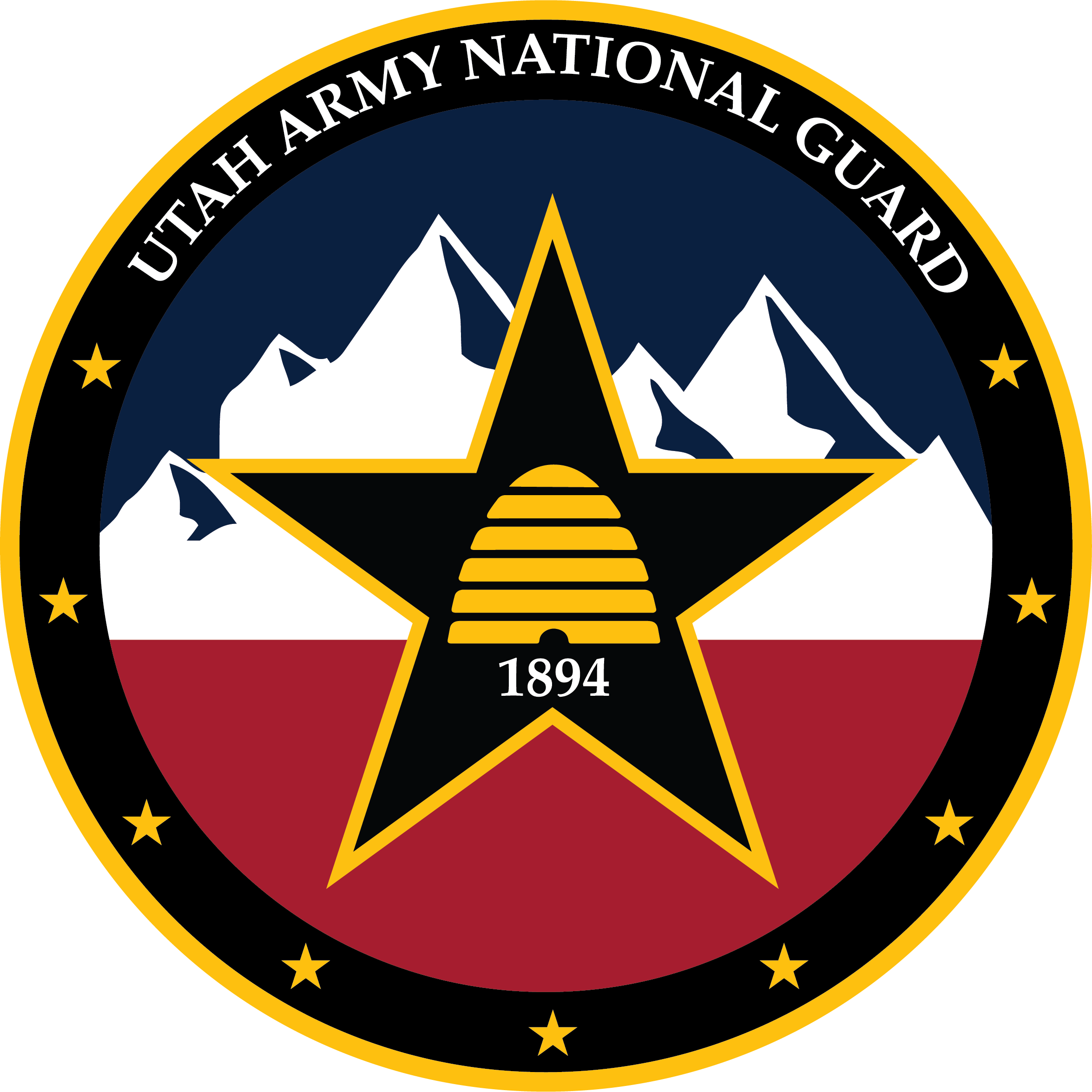
- Utah Army National Guard
  - 19th Special Forces Group (Airborne)
    - 1st Battalion, 19th Special Forces Group
    - Group Support Battalion, 19th Special Forces Group
  - 65th Field Artillery Brigade
    - 1st Battalion, 145th Field Artillery
    - 2d Battalion, 222d Field Artillery
  - 97th Aviation Troop Command
    - 1st Battalion, 211th Aviation Regiment
    - 2d Battalion, 211th Aviation Regiment
  - 97th Troop Command
    - 23d Army Band
    - 85th Weapons of Mass Destruction-Civil Support Team (WMD CST)
    - 625th Military Police Battalion
    - Medical Detachment
  - 204th Maneuver Enhancement Brigade (MEB)
    - 1st Battalion, 204th Infantry Regiment
    - 1457th Engineer Battalion
    - Main Command Post Operational Detachment (MCP-OD), 4th Infantry Division
  - 300th Military Intelligence Brigade (Linguist)
    - 141st Military Intelligence Battalion (Linguist)
    - 142d Military Intelligence Battalion (Linguist)
  - 640th Regiment, Regional Training Institute (RTI)
    - 1st Battalion, NCO Academy
    - 2d Battalion, Modular
    - 3d Battalion, Field Artillery
    - 4th Battalion, Military Intelligence
  - Joint Force Headquarters
  - Recruiting and Retention Battalion
  - Utah Training Center - Camp Williams
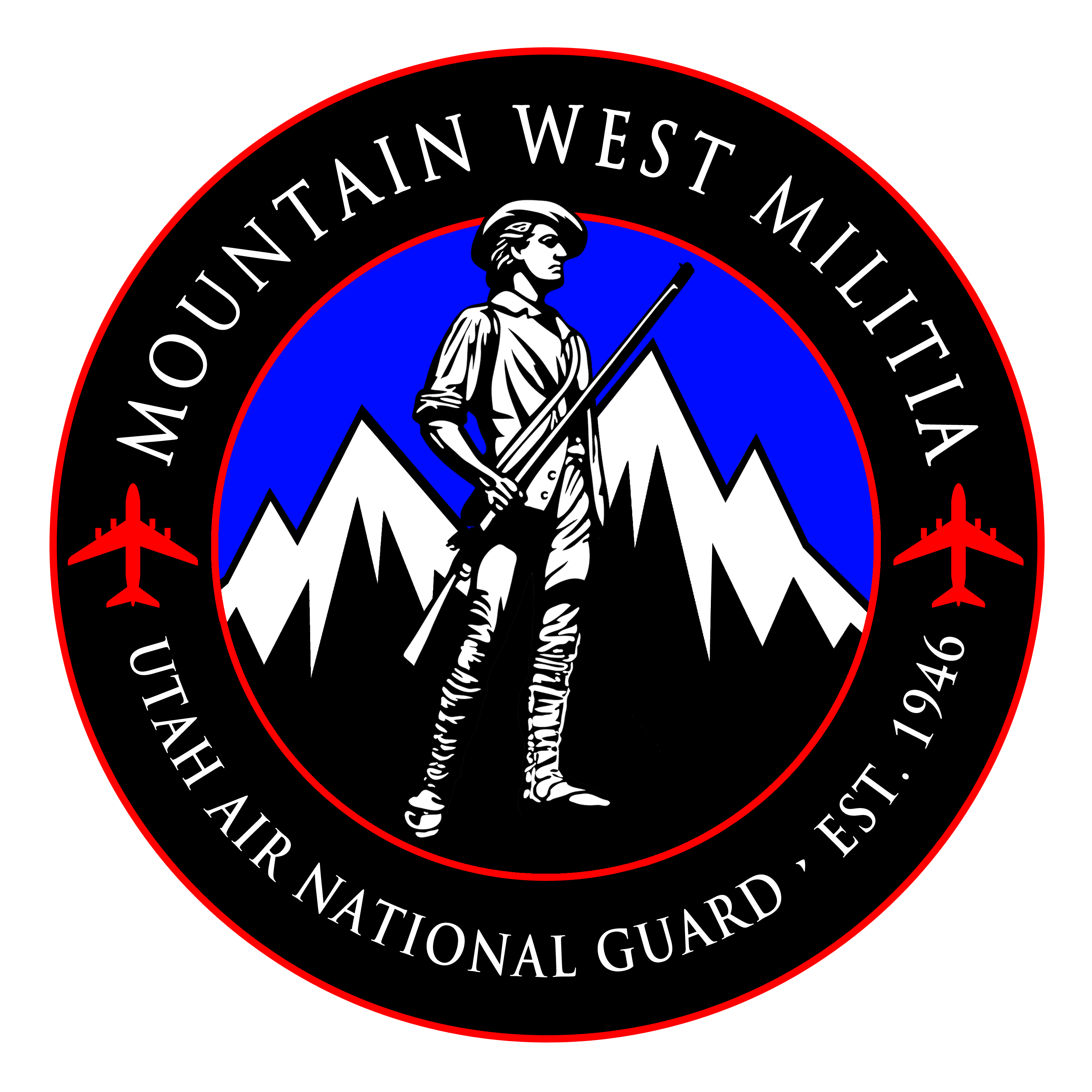
- Utah Air National Guard
  - 151st Air Wing
    - 151st Intelligence, Surveillance, and Reconnaissance Group
      - 130th Engineering Installation Squadron
      - 151st Intelligence Support Squadron
      - 169th Intelligence Squadron
    - 151st Maintenance Group
      - 151st Aircraft Maintenance Squadron
      - 151st Maintenance Operations Flight
      - 151st Maintenance Squadron
    - 151st Medical Group
    - 151st Mission Support Group
      - 151st Civil Engineering Squadron
      - 151st Communications Squadron
      - 151st Force Support Squadron
      - 151st Logistics Readiness Squadron
      - 151st Security Forces Squadron
    - 151st Operations Group
      - 109th Air Control Squadron
      - 151st Operations Support Squadron
      - 191st Air Refueling Squadron

== History ==
=== The Nauvoo Legion ===
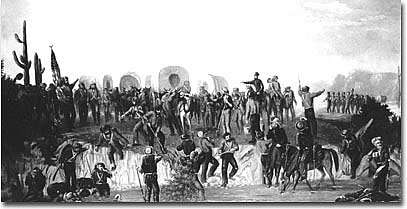
Painting of the Mormon Battalion by George M. Ottinger, arriving at the Gila River near present day Gila Bend AZ during their 1846 advance through northern Sonora, Mexico, now the present day southern Arizona, United States.

The origins of the Utah National Guard are linked to the Nauvoo Legion, a militia created in 1840 by The Church of Jesus Christ of Latter-day Saints in Illinois. Following the church's migration to the west, the Legion was formally re-established in 1852 under Utah's territorial laws. This effort was largely driven by veterans of the Mormon Battalion, who had previously served in the Mexican-American War, and it provided a formal militia for the territory.

The Nauvoo Legion was active in several key historical moments in Utah, such as the Utah War of 1857-1858 and various conflicts with local Native American tribes. However, the federal Edmunds-Tucker Act of 1887 led to its official disbandment. By 1894, the modern Utah National Guard was organized, becoming the state's officially sanctioned military body.

=== Establishment of the Utah National Guard ===
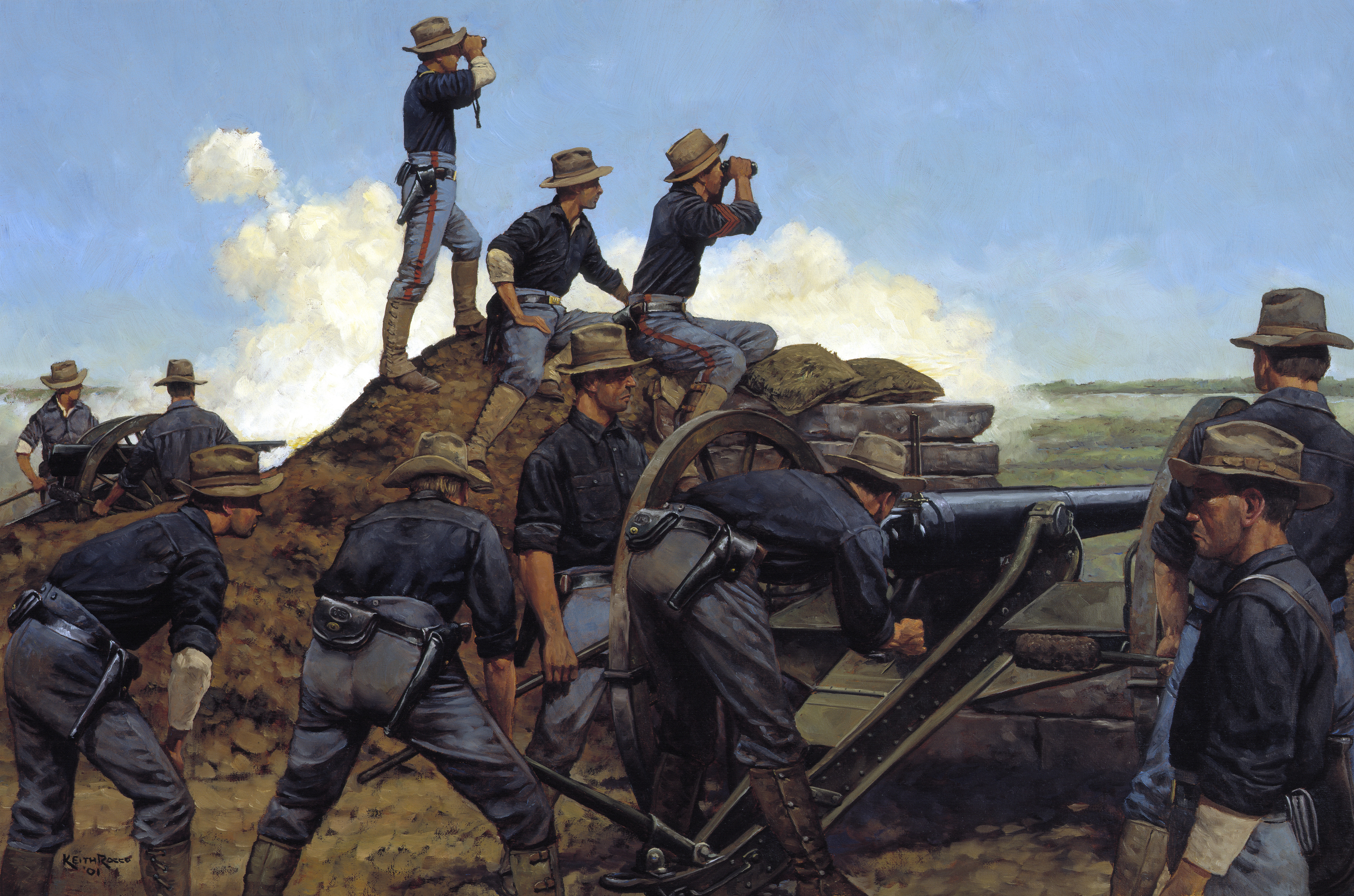
During the Spanish-American War, the Utah Light Artillery provided crucial support in the Philippines, playing a key role in the battle for Manila on August 13, 1898. The batteries delivered accurate and close fire support for the infantry as they advanced against the Spanish Forces.

The Utah National Guard was officially founded in Salt Lake City on March 26, 1894, with the creation of its first two infantry companies and an artillery battery. Not long after, in April 1894, the Guard undertook its first state mission, assisting law enforcement with managing Kelley's Industrial Army as it passed through Utah. In 1898, a significant number of Utahns, primarily Guard members, volunteered to serve in the Philippines during the Spanish-American War, where they were involved in extensive combat operations near Manila. Later, in 1916, President Woodrow Wilson mobilized the National Guard to address tensions along the Mexican border. Utah contributed artillery, cavalry, and hospital corps units to patrol the region. Some of these units were still under federal command when the United States declared war on Germany on April 6, 1917. Approximately 1,400 members of the Utah Guard served in World War I, many integrated with active-duty Army units on the front lines.

In the years between the wars, the Jordan Narrows area was developed as a permanent training site. On April 25, 1928, the Governor of Utah officially named the site Camp W.G. Williams. Over the following 15 years, it underwent significant development through Works Progress Administration projects, including the construction of the camp's historic Officer's Club.

=== The Utah National Guard Mobilizes for War War II ===
As Germany's aggressive actions in Europe grew in the late 1930s, it became clear that the United States was ill-prepared for a potential war. With the nation still recovering from the Great Depression, the national budget was limited. In response, Congress approved an increased defense budget, and in May 1940, the President federalized the National Guard. Over 4,000 enlisted soldiers and 150 officers from the Utah National Guard were activated for service. A large portion of Utah's Guard members were assigned to the 40th Division, a composite unit that also included Guardsmen from California and Nevada. They were initially slated for a year of training at Camp San Luis Obispo, California, before being deployed overseas.

The attack on Pearl Harbor altered their mission, and they were first tasked with defending the U.S. west coast. By late 1942, they were moved to defend the Hawaiian Islands. Subsequently, Utah National Guard units participated in combat across several Pacific islands, including Guadalcanal, Panay, Negros, and Okinawa.

By 1943, around 2,600 Utah Guard members had been involved in World War II. The 204th Field Artillery Battalion served in the European theater with General Patton's 3rd Army. Meanwhile, several other units, including the 115th Medical Regiment, 115th Ordinance Company, 115th Engineer Regiment, the 145th, 213th, 222nd, and 225th Field Artillery Battalions, and the 640th and 815th Tank Destroyer Battalions, fought in the Pacific.

=== The Rise of the Utah Air National Guard ===
The Utah Air National Guard was established on November 18, 1946, when the 191st Fighter Squadron received its federal recognition at the Salt Lake City Municipal Airport. Initially equipped with F-51 Mustangs, the squadron later transitioned to the F-86 Sabre. The mission of the Utah Air National Guard has evolved over the years, and it has operated eight different types of aircraft since its founding.

=== Korean War Mobilization ===
Following five years of escalating tensions, the Korean War began in June 1950. In response to North Korea's invasion of South Korea, President Harry S. Truman deployed U.S. air, ground, and naval forces to support the United Nations' effort to defend the Republic of Korea. Between 1951 and 1953, approximately 3,080 members of the Utah National Guard were activated, which included the entire Air Guard and 62 percent of the Army Guard. A notable achievement occurred on August 8, 1952, when Captain Clifford Jolley of the Utah Air National Guard became the first Air National Guard "Ace" after downing his fifth MiG-15 jet over Korea.

Several Utah Army National Guard units were called to service, but only the 213th, 204th, and 145th Field Artillery Battalions saw combat in Korea. The other units were assigned to training and replacement roles. The 213th Field Artillery Battalion particularly distinguished itself during the Battle of Kapyong in May 1951, where its members successfully repelled a nighttime enemy raid and captured over 800 prisoners.

=== From Vietnam to the Persian Gulf ===
During the 1961 Berlin Crisis, 1,600 Utah Guard members were mobilized, primarily to fill stateside roles left by active-duty forces deployed to Germany. In 1965, while the Utah National Guard was placed on alert for potential mobilization to Vietnam, no Army Guard units were ultimately activated. However, some individual members volunteered for service. The Air Guard contributed by flying 96 volunteer missions to Vietnam, accumulating 6,600 flight hours, which included a mission to deliver Christmas gifts to soldiers. The Guard was activated in the spring of 1983 to respond to severe flooding in Utah, providing critical support to save lives and property across 13 counties. Following Iraq's invasion of Kuwait in 1990, Utah Air Guard crews were among the first to volunteer for airlift missions supporting the U.S. military buildup in Saudi Arabia for Operation Desert Shield/Desert Storm. Six Utah Army Guard units were activated for the conflict. By the end of the war, 1,706 Utah Guard members had served as either volunteers or on active duty.

=== The Global War on Terrorism and Modern Missions ===
In the aftermath of the September 11, 2001 terrorist attacks, the Utah National Guard was assigned to enhance security at the Salt Lake International Airport and assist the FBI with intelligence translation. Since then, over 17,000 members have been deployed worldwide for operations such as Noble Eagle, Enduring Freedom, and Iraqi Freedom.

The 2002 Winter Olympics in Salt Lake City required a massive security operation, with the Utah National Guard playing a central role in law enforcement augmentation. More than 4,500 Guard members from Utah and 23 other states were deployed to secure the Games. In 2003, the Utah National Guard initiated its State Partnership Program with the Kingdom of Morocco. This partnership proved vital when a major earthquake struck Morocco in 2004, and the Guard quickly provided humanitarian aid. The partnership continues to thrive through joint training exercises.

The Guard also supported relief efforts for hurricanes Katrina and Rita in 2005 and 2006, and provided shelter for over 600 evacuees at Camp Williams. In more recent years, the Utah National Guard has been involved in domestic operations, including support for the U.S. Border Patrol, security missions in Washington D.C., counter-drug operations, and wildland firefighting.

== Adjutant Generals of Utah ==
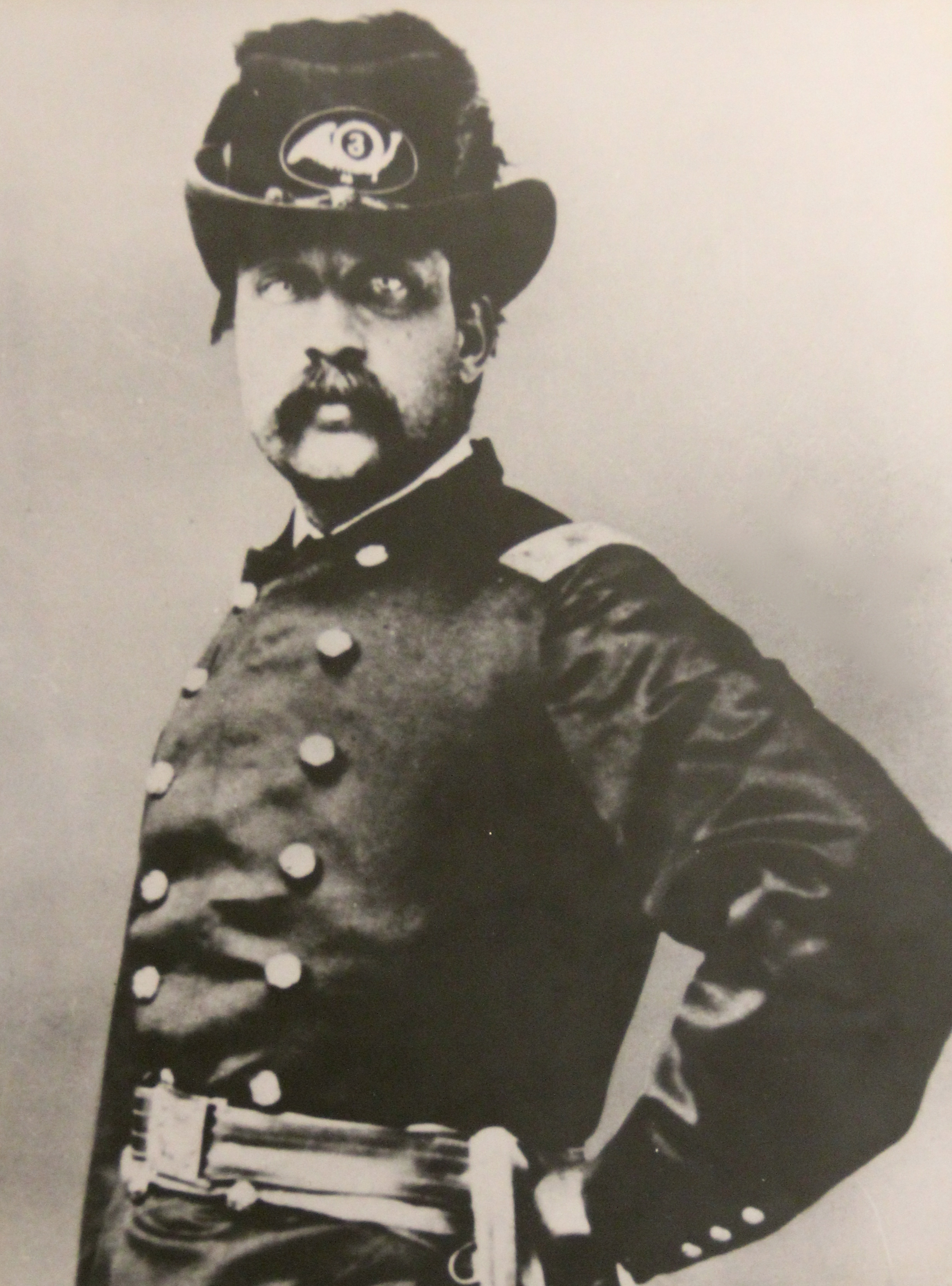
Brigadier General George M. Ottinger, the first Adjutant General of the Utah National Guard

Name	Term Start	Term End
BG George M. Ottinger	14 March 1894	30 April 1895
BG John Q. Cannon	30 April 1895	9 March 1899
BG Charles S. Burton	9 March 1899	2 January 1905
BG John M. Bowman	3 January 1905	21 June 1905
COL Joseph Geoghegan	22 June 1905	1 March 1906
BG Raymond C. Naylor	17 March 1906	25 January 1907
BG Edgar A. Wedgwood	28 January 1907	1 January 1917
BG William G. Williams	2 January 1917	24 September 1917
COL Hans M. Lund	9 October 1917	24 September 1918
COL Fred Jorgensen	25 September 1918	1 November 1920
BG William G. Williams	1 November 1920	31 May 1946
BG J. Wallace West	1 June 1946	31 July 1953
MG Maxwell E. Rich	1 August 1953	15 September 1964
MG Maurice L. Watts	16 September 1964	20 November 1980
MG Van L. Hixson	21 November 1980	30 September 1982
MG John L. Matthews	1 October 1982	30 September 1994
MG James M. Miller	1 October 1994	30 September 2000
MG Brian L. Tarbet	1 October 2000	30 September 2012
MG Jefferson S. Burton	1 October 2012	6 November 2019
BG Michael J. Turley	7 November 2019	21 August 2023
MG Daniel D. Boyack	21 August 2023	3 August 2026
BG Michael D. Kjar	3 August 2026	Present

== Museum ==
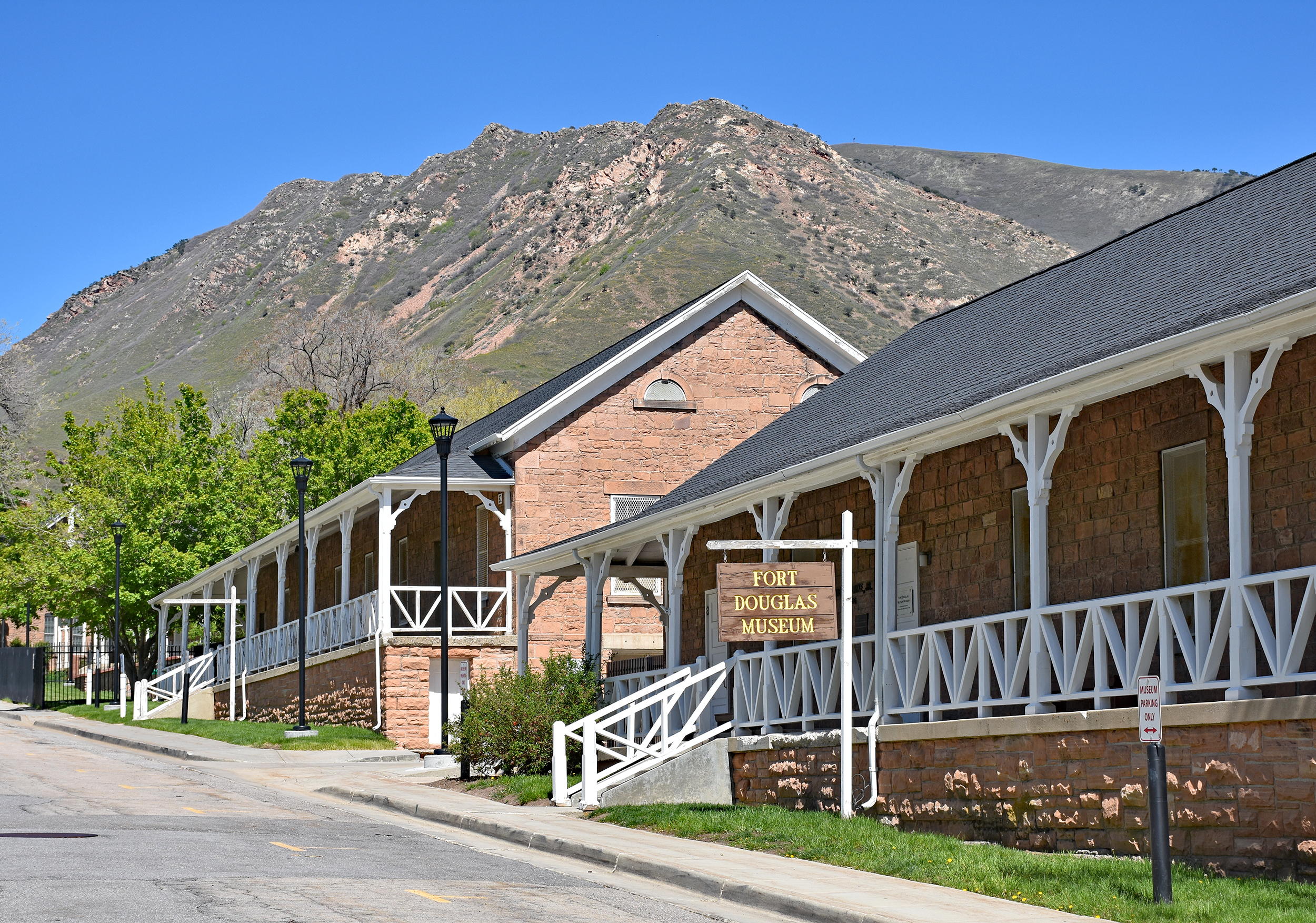
Utah Military Museum (formerly known as Fort Douglas Military Museum), Salt Lake City, Utah.

The Utah Military Museum (formerly the Fort Douglas Military Museum) is operated and managed by the Utah National Guard and serves as its primary repository for historical documents and artifacts. The museum is forecasted to undergo significant renovations and updates in late summer 2026.

== Camp Williams ==
Camp Williams is a historic and vital training center for the Utah National Guard, situated strategically between Salt Lake and Utah Counties.

It was officially named in 1928 in honor of Brigadier General William G. Williams for his efforts in establishing a permanent training site. The camp's origins trace back to 1914 when President Woodrow Wilson designated 18,700 acres for military training.

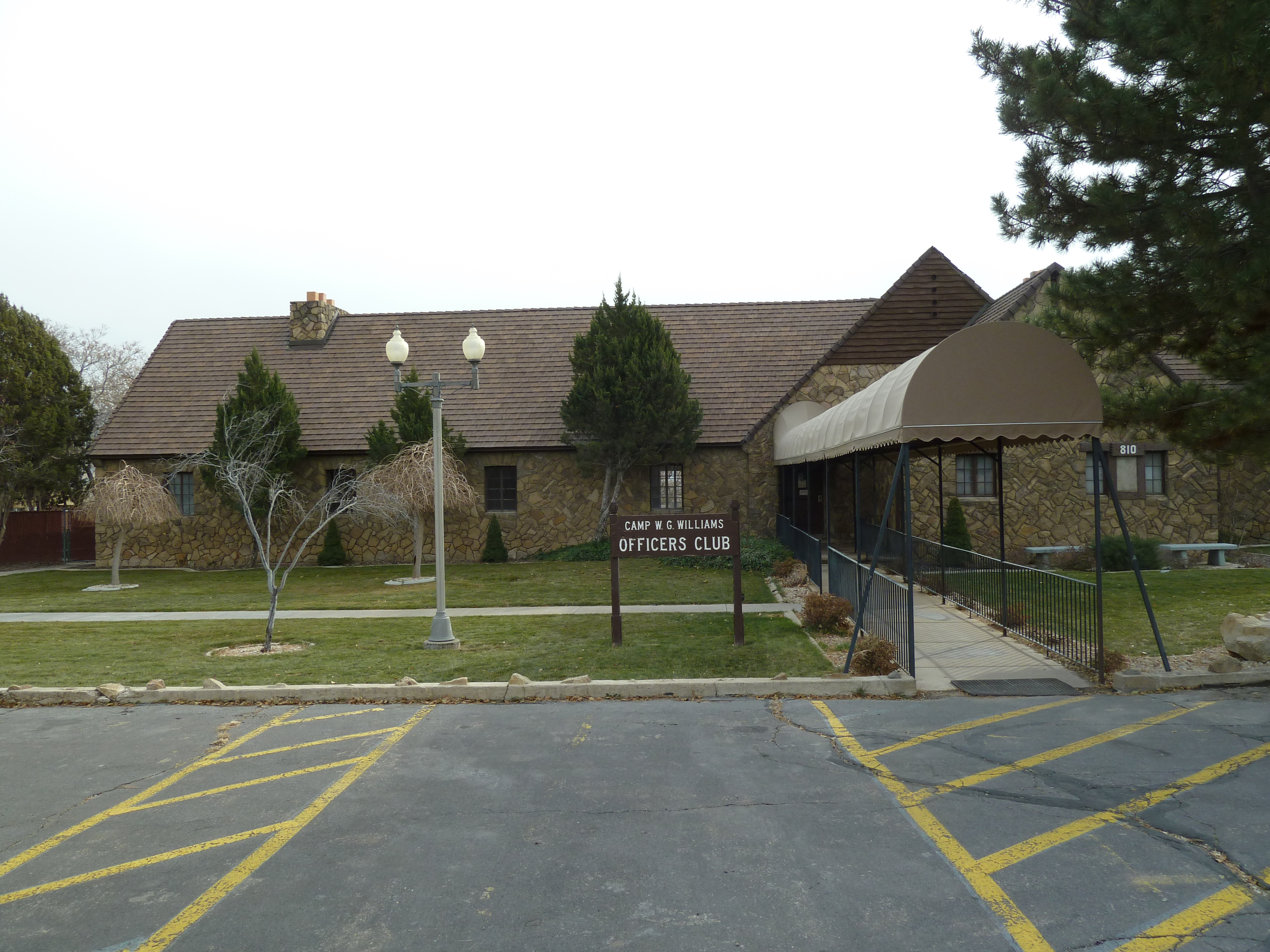
The Officers Club on Camp Williams prior to its renovation in 2023.

Spanning over 28,000 acres, Camp Williams features a rugged, mountainous terrain that provides a training environment similar to what soldiers might face in combat. This landscape is utilized for a variety of training exercises, including small-arms firing, artillery drills, and demolition.

Camp Williams has been instrumental in preparing troops for various conflicts, including World War II, the Korean War, and the War on Terrorism. Beyond its military significance, Camp Williams plays a role in the community. It provides support to law enforcement and civic organizations and offers recreational programs. The camp also focuses on natural resource management to ensure a sustainable training environment.

== State Partnership Program (SPP) ==
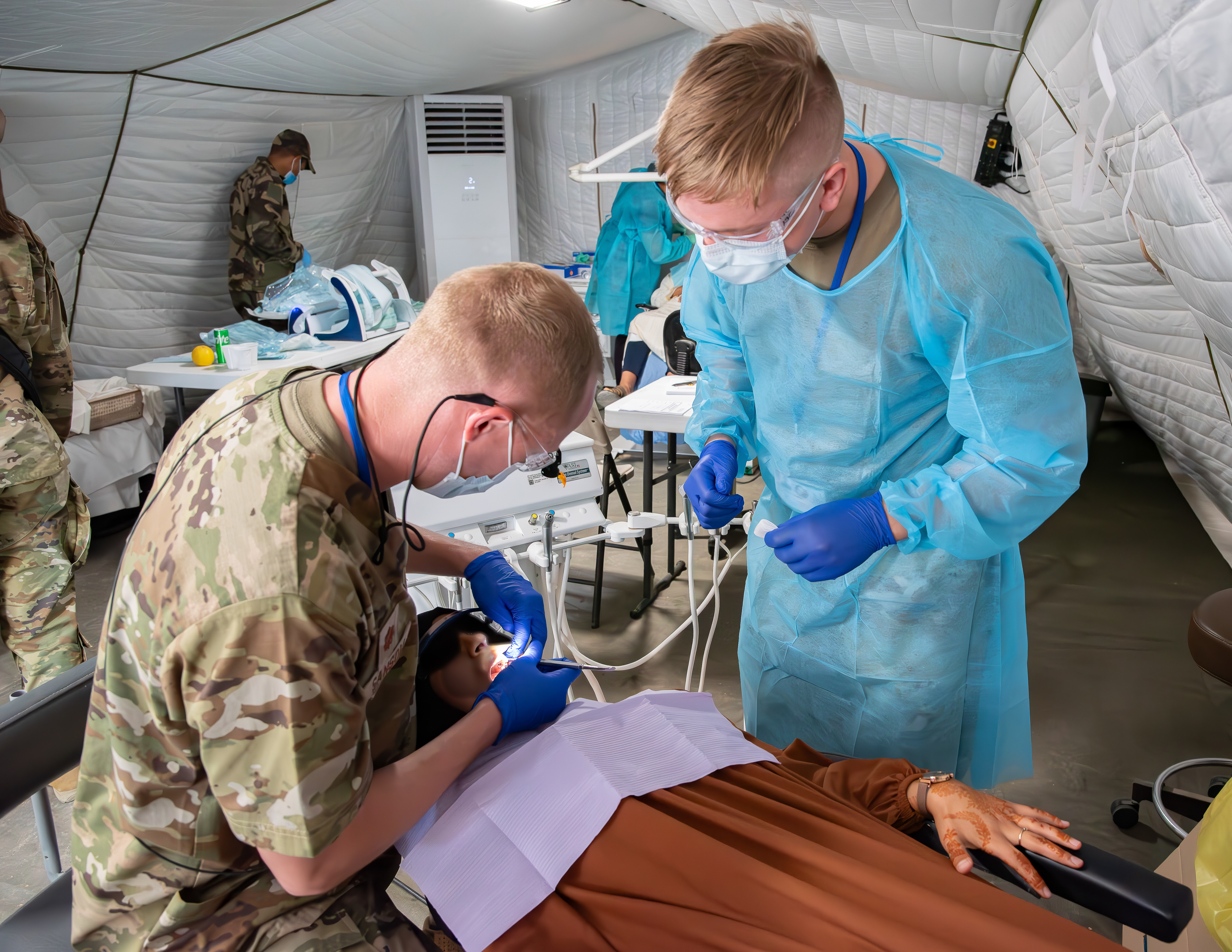
As part of a humanitarian and civic outreach program during the African Lion 2025 exercise, U.S. military medical personnel provided dental care to local residents in Anzi, Morocco. In this photo from May 12, 2025, members of the Utah Air National Guard's 151st Medical Group perform a tooth extraction.

The Utah National Guard's State Partnership Program with the Kingdom of Morocco is a significant and long-standing relationship. This partnership is part of the broader National Guard State Partnership Program (SPP), a Department of Defense initiative that pairs National Guard units with foreign countries to foster long-term, mutually beneficial relationships. The SPP aims to promote security, enhance military capabilities, and build enduring international ties. It evolved from a 1991 program and has grown to include over 100 partnerships globally. The program facilitates military-to-military engagements and also leverages relationships across government, economic, and social spheres.

The partnership between the Utah National Guard and Morocco began in 2003 and has been described as "enduring and substantial."Over the past two decades, this collaboration has led to numerous joint training exercises and humanitarian efforts.

Key aspects of the Utah-Morocco partnership include:

- Humanitarian and Disaster Relief: The partnership has a strong focus on disaster preparedness. A notable example is the "Maroc Mantlet" exercise, an annual event focused on responding to crises like earthquakes and tsunamis. The Utah National Guard has assisted the Royal Moroccan Armed Forces in developing disaster response and management capabilities, including a Disaster Response and Casualty Care program. This training proved valuable during the 2023 Al Haouz earthquake in Morocco.
- Medical Cooperation: The Utah National Guard's medical units have worked extensively with their Moroccan counterparts. This includes training Moroccan medical professionals and participating in humanitarian civic assistance operations to provide medical services to underserved populations in Morocco.
- Military-to-Military Engagements: The partnership involves various joint exercises, such as "African Lion," which is U.S. Africa Command's largest exercise. These exercises enhance interoperability and share best practices in areas like artillery, aviation, and special forces operations.
- Cultural and Youth Exchanges: The relationship extends beyond military exercises to include youth exchange programs, which help foster cultural understanding and build personal connections between the people of Utah and Morocco.

This partnership is a testament to the success of the State Partnership Program, demonstrating how state-level military cooperation can contribute to broader international security and goodwill.

== See also ==
- Utah Territorial Militia
- Utah State Defense Force

Preceded by Utah Territorial Militia; 1852–1887	Utah National Guard; 1894-	Succeeded by -
