= Van Hixson =

American National Guard general

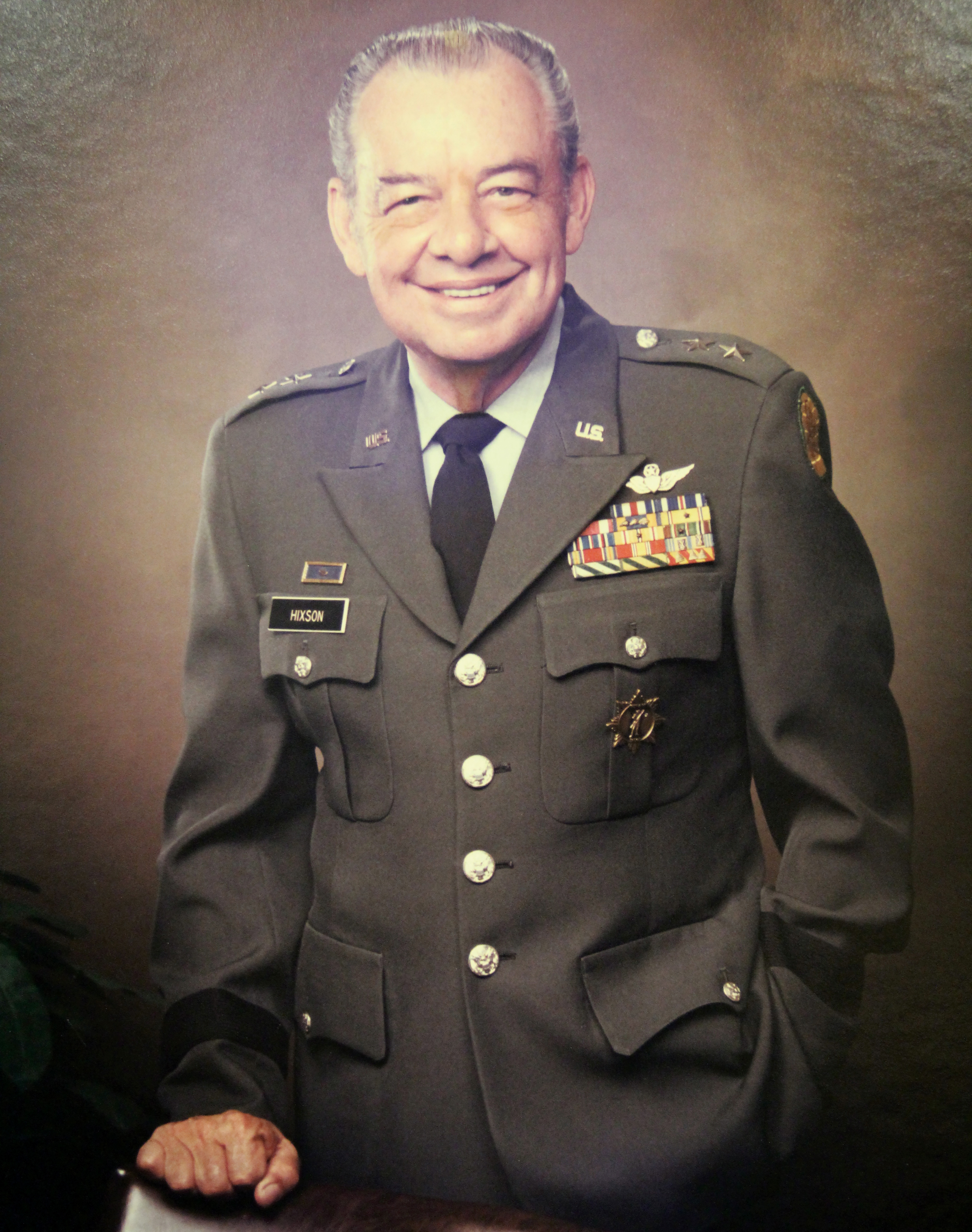
- Born: 27 November 1920; Midvale, Utah
- Died: 19 February 1989 (aged 68)
- Allegiance: United States of America
- Branch: United States Army
- Service years: 1938–1982
- Rank: Major General
- Commands: Utah National Guard; 653rd Observation Battalion
- Conflicts: World War II
- Awards: Distinguished Service Medal; Silver Star; Distinguished Flying Cross; Air Medal (4)

Van Hixson (27 November 1920 – 19 February 1989) was a retired United States Army major general. A veteran Army aviator, he flew B-17 bombers during World War II and later served as The Adjutant General of the Utah National Guard from November 1980 to September 1982.

== Early life and education ==
Born in Midvale, Utah, Hixson joined the Utah National Guard and began studying at the University of Utah in September 1938 after finishing high school. His education was interrupted by World War II military service, but he later graduated from courses at the Army Command and General Staff College in 1960 and the Army War College in 1977.

== Military career ==
Hixson was called to active duty in the United States Army Air Forces on 3 March 1941, and was commissioned as a second lieutenant on 8 May 1943 when he completed flight school. After receiving B-17 training, he was assigned to the 96th Bombardment Group (Heavy) at RAF Snetterton Heath in England flying missions over Europe. Promoted to first lieutenant, Hixson was given command of his own bomber and crew in the 337th Bombardment Squadron (Heavy). On 11 April 1944, after completing his midday bombing run over Rostock on the Baltic Coast of northern Germany, his plane was downed by a German fighter aircraft. He crash landed his craft northwest of Kappeln and was captured along with his entire crew. His bombardier 2nd Lt. Don Giffin was hospitalized with a shoulder wound and the other prisoners were sent for interrogation. Hixson was then imprisoned at Stalag Luft I for the remainder of the war in Europe. On 19 May 1950, he was awarded the Distinguished Flying Cross for saving the crew of his damaged aircraft. Hixson also received the Silver Star and four Air Medals for his World War II service.

Released from active duty in January 1946, Hixson rejoined the Utah National Guard as an artillery officer in November 1946. After commanding an artillery battery, he returned to aviation as an artillery observation officer. In 1957, Hixson completed helicopter training and assumed command of the 653rd Field Artillery Observation Battalion in July. He later qualified as a helicopter instructor in 1964.

Hixson was appointed assistant adjutant general for the Utah Army National Guard on 1 December 1967 and was promoted to brigadier general on 10 August 1970. He served as adjutant general of the Utah National Guard from November 1980 until his retirement in September 1982. In addition to his combat awards, Hixson also received the Distinguished Service Medal.

Hixson died in 1989 and was interred at the Wasatch Lawn Memorial Park in Millcreek, Utah.
