= William Grey Williams =

Adjutant general of Utah, namesake of Camp Williams

Adjutant General of Utah
- In office 1916–1946
- Governor: Simon Bamberger; Charles R. Mabey; George Dern; Henry H. Blood; Herbert B. Maw

Personal details
- Born: December 27, 1872; Pembrokeshire, Wales, U.K.
- Died: January 22, 1948 (aged 75); Salt Lake City, Utah, U.S.

William Grey Williams (December 27, 1872 – January 22, 1948) was a Brigadier General who served as Adjutant General of Utah for over thirty years, with military service spanning two World Wars. He is the namesake of Camp Williams, which he helped establish in the 1920s.

== Early life and education ==
Williams was born in 1872 in Pembrokeshire, Wales and emigrated to America as a young boy. He moved to Utah at age eleven.

== Military service ==
Williams entered the Utah National Guard as a private in 1900 and later served as a Lieutenant Colonel in the National Guard. By 1904, he was promoted to Major.

During World War I, he commanded units in England and France in 1917 and 1918. In 1916, he was selected as Adjutant General of Utah by Governor-elect Simon Bamberger, a role which he held until 1946, spanning five governors.

In 1926, he was promoted to Colonel. During his tenure as a leader within the National Guard, he worked to establish a site as a permanent training location (now known as Camp Williams). In 1931, he was promoted to Brigadier General in the Utah National Guard. In the 1930s, he was commanding officer of the 65th Field Artillery Brigade.

During World War II, Williams was Utah's Director of Selective Service.

== Death ==
Williams died in 1948, aged 75. He is interred at Utah State Veterans Memorial Park.

== Awards and honors ==
In 1928, Camp Williams was named in honor of Brigadier General Williams. A bronze statue of Williams was unveiled in 2024.
