= 204th Brigade =

204th Brigade may refer to:

== Croatia ==
- 204th Vukovar Brigade

== Serbia ==
- 204th Air Brigade

== Russia/Soviet Union ==
- 204th Guards Anti-Aircraft Rocket Brigade

== Ukraine ==
- 204th Tactical Aviation Brigade

== United Kingdom ==
- 204th (2nd Cheshire) Brigade
- 204th Independent Infantry Brigade (Home)

== United States ==
- 204th Maneuver Enhancement Brigade

== See also ==
- 204th Brigade Support Battalion, United States
