= 145th Field Artillery Regiment =

Regiment of the United States Army

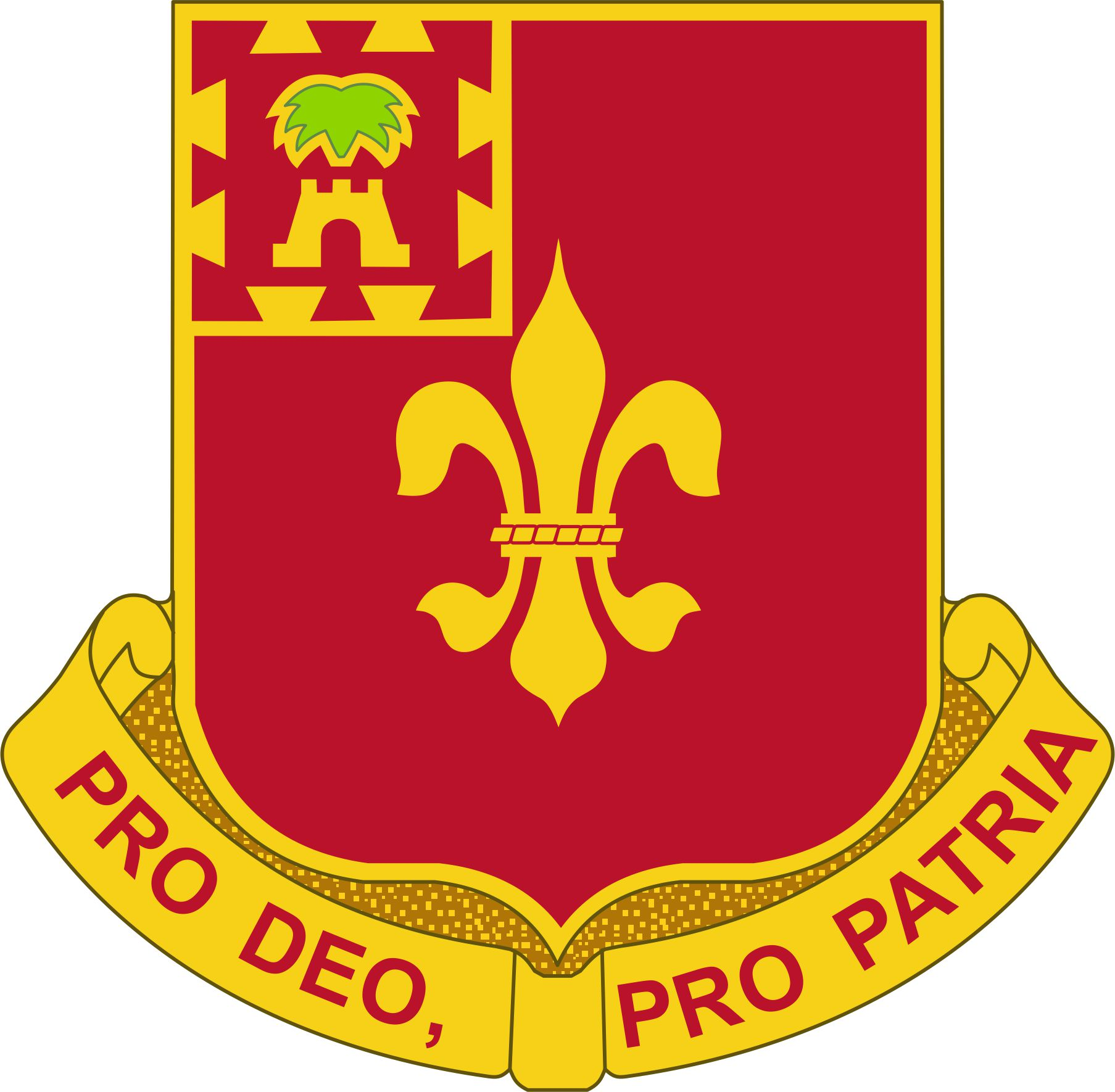
Regimental insignia

The 145th Field Artillery Regiment is a regiment of the United States Army and the Utah National Guard.

== Composition ==
=== Subordinate units ===
The 1st Battalion 145th Field Artillery Regiment is currently composed of three firing batteries a forward support company, and a headquarters battery. The battalion is currently commanded by LTC Shane Christiansen whose Command Sergeant Major is CSM Clint Markland.

HHB, "Henchmen" is currently commanded by CPT Alex Mikle.

Alpha Battery, "Anger", is currently commanded by CPT Isaac Chamberlain. Alpha Battery won the National Guard’s prestigious Alexander Hamilton award in 2023, marking it as the Guard’s top battery.

Bravo Battery, "Terminators", is currently commanded by CPT John “Johnny Utah” Christiansen.

Charlie Battery, "Animals", is currently commanded by 1LT Kasey Correnti. Expected to win Battalion TOP POC and TOP GUN awards in 2026.

The 214th FSC, "Wolverines" is currently commanded by CPT Matthew Jensen.

== History ==
=== Origins ===
The regiment has its origins in field artillery units raised in Utah in 1854, but first gained the designation 145th Field Artillery in 1917. It was organized and entered into federal service in October 1917 at Camp Kearny, California. It became a component of the 65th Field Artillery Brigade, of the 40th Division. The first Commander was Colonel Richard W. Young and it was composed of two Field Artillery Battalions.

=== 1922-1942 ===
The regiment was reconstituted on 11 October 1921 in the Utah National Guard as the 145th Field Artillery and assigned to the 40th Division. It was organized and Federally recognized 13 July 1923 with Headquarters at Salt Lake City. The regiment built the 145th Field Artillery Monument in Salt Lake City in 1927. Inducted into Federal service 3 March 1941 at home stations. Relieved 18 February 1942 from assignment to the 40th Division.

The regiment was broken up 24 March–6 June 1942.

=== 1947-1999 ===
Reorganized and Federally recognized 6 November 1947 with Headquarters at Provo. Ordered into active Federal service 3 September 1950 at home stations. (145th Field Artillery Battalion [NGUS] organized and Federally recognized 3 March 1953 with Headquarters at Provo.) Released 18 March 1955 from active Federal service and reverted to state control; Federal recognition concurrently withdrawn from the 145th Field Artillery Battalion (NGUS).

Headquarters, 145th Field Artillery (reconstituted 25 August 1945 in the Utah National Guard), and the 145th and 204th Field Artillery Battalions were consolidated on 1 July 1959 to form the 145th Artillery, a parent regiment under the Combat Arms Regimental System, to consist of the 1st and 2d Howitzer Battalions. Reorganized 30 April 1964 to consist of the 1st Howitzer Battalion and the 2d Battalion. Reorganized 1 December 1967 to consist of the 1st Battalion. Redesignated 1 May 1972 as the 145th Field Artillery. Withdrawn 1 June 1989 from the Combat Arms Regimental System and reorganized under the United States Army Regimental System. Consolidated 1 October 1996 with the 140th Field Artillery and consolidated unit designated as the 145th Field Artillery to consist of the 1st Battalion.

=== 21st century ===
The regiment's 1st Battalion now forms part of the 65th Field Artillery Brigade. The battalion took part in "Western Strike '22" in June 2022 at the Orchard Combat Training Centre, Idaho.
