= 151st Regional Support Group =

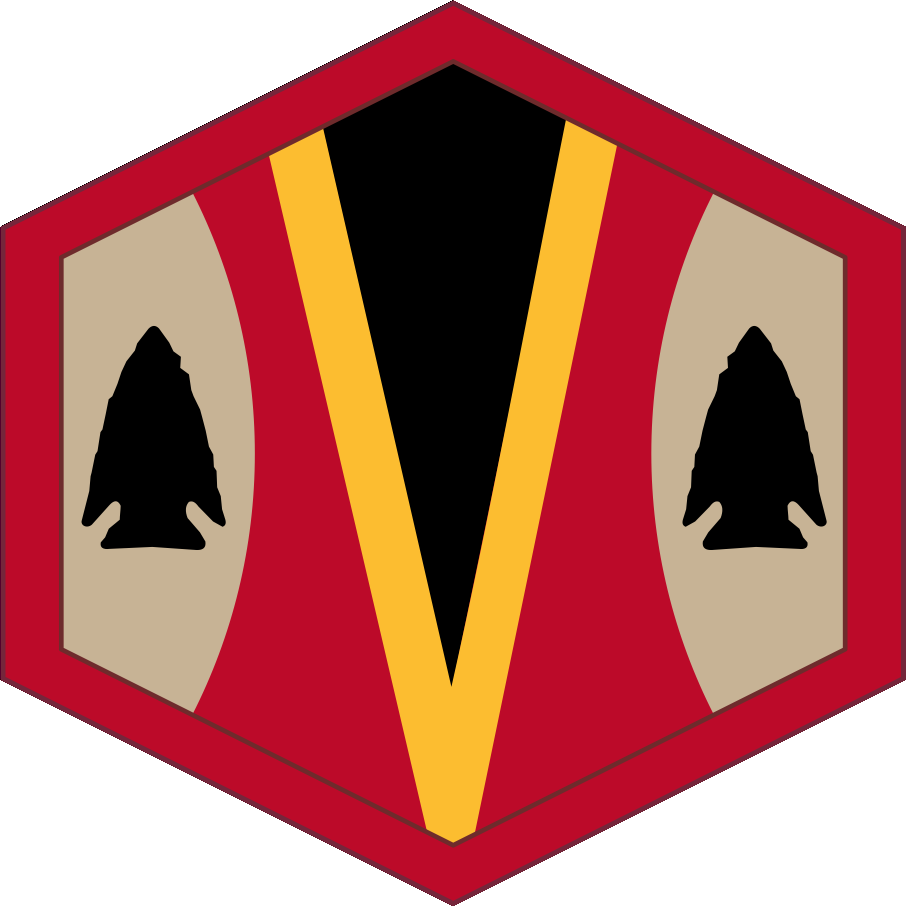
- Active: 2006 - Present
- Country: United States
- Branch: United States Army National Guard
- Role: Support
- Size: Group (Brigade)
- Part of: Massachusetts National Guard
- Garrison/HQ: Framingham, Massachusetts
- Motto: Victoria Per Perseverantia (Victory Through Perseverance)

Commanders
- Current commander: Col. Matthew Porter
- Command Sergeant Major: CSM James E. Perrault

Insignia
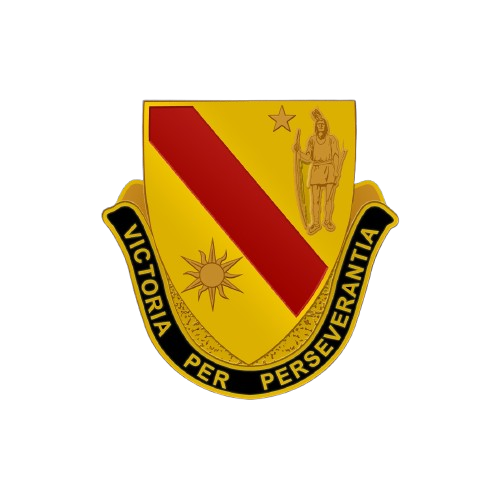
- 151st Regional Support Group DUI

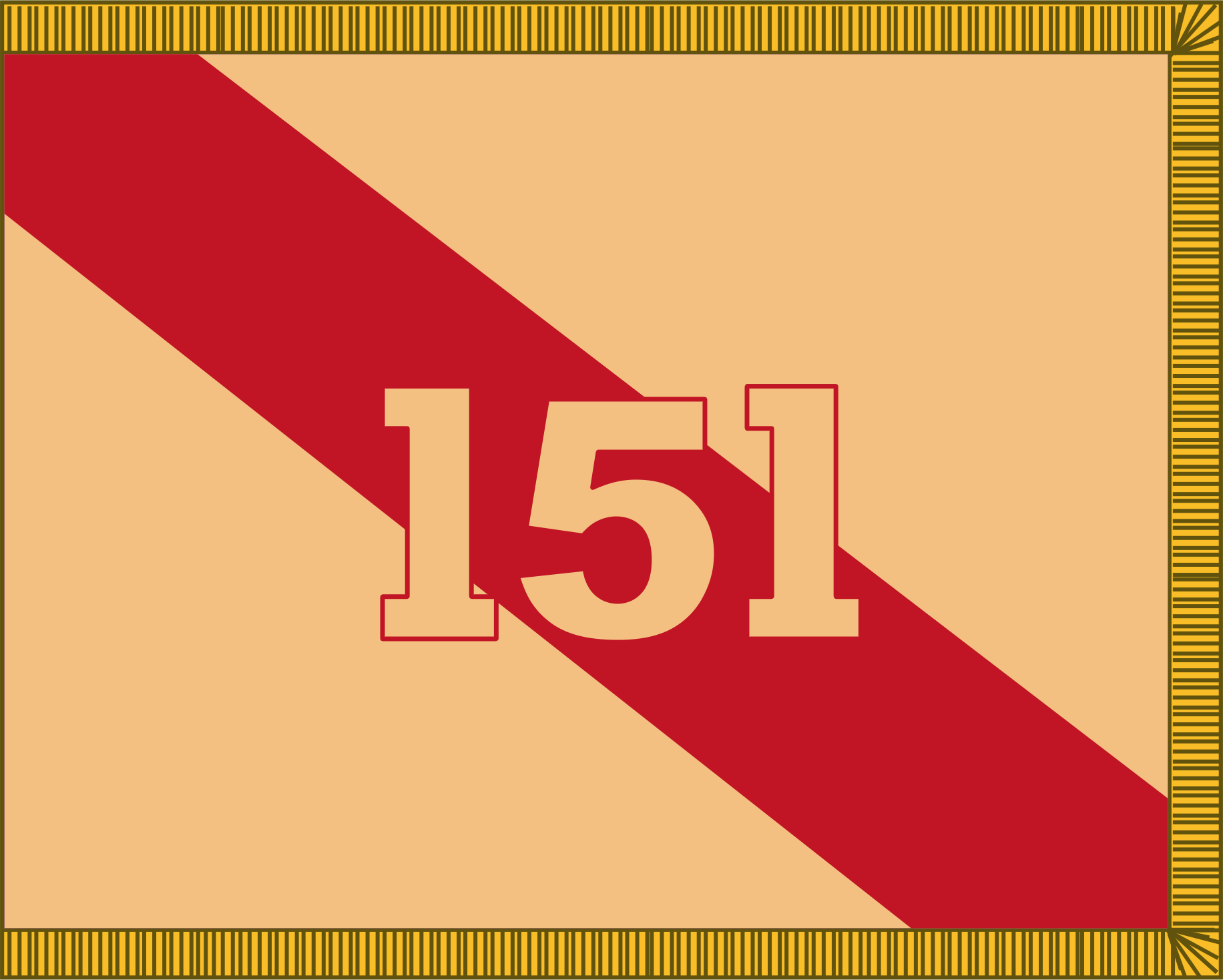
- 151st Regional Support Group Flag

The 151st Regional Support Group (151 RSG) is a unit of the Massachusetts Army National Guard since April 2, 2006. The Group's mission is to provide support for the units in the MARNG, especially to ensure operational readiness and training. In 2014 the 151 RSG was mobilized to support efforts to deal with the major January snowstorm. In 2020 the unit's "Steel Dragon" task force provided assistance during the COVID-19 response as part of Operation Honest Pay. In 2021, the 151 RSG supported the mission to support the US Secret Service during and after the presidential inauguration.

== Subordinate Units ==
- 164th Transportation Battalion Dorchester Armory | Dorchester
  - Headquarters and Headquarters Detachment
  - 1058th Transportation Company Hingham Armory | Hingham
  - 1060th Transportation Company Framingham Armory | Framingham
  - 1166th Transportation Company Worcester Armory | Worcester
  - 110th Ordnance Company Massachusetts Army National Guard Combined Support Maintenance Shop | Devens
  - 125th Quartermaster Company Worcester Armory | Worcester
- 3rd Battalion, 126th Aviation Regiment Camp Edwards | JB Cape Cod
  - Headquarters and Headquarters Company
  - Company A
  - Company B (MD ARNG) Aberdeen Proving Ground Edgewood Area | Aberdeen PG, Edgewood, Maryland
  - Company C (VT ARNG) Vermont Army National Guard Army Aviation Support Facility | Vermont
  - Company D
  - Company E
  - Company F
- Company D, 223rd Military Intelligence Battalion Cambridge Armory | Cambridge
