= Utah Army National Guard =

Component of the US Army and military of the U.S. state of Utah

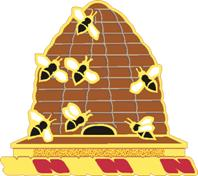
- Utah Army National Guard Headquarters DUI
- Active: 1849-present
- Country: United States
- Allegiance: Utah
- Branch: United States Army
- Type: ARNG Headquarters Command
- Role: United States Army National Guard
- Part of: Utah National Guard
- Garrison/HQ: Draper, Utah

Commanders
- Current commander: Major General Daniel Boyack

Insignia
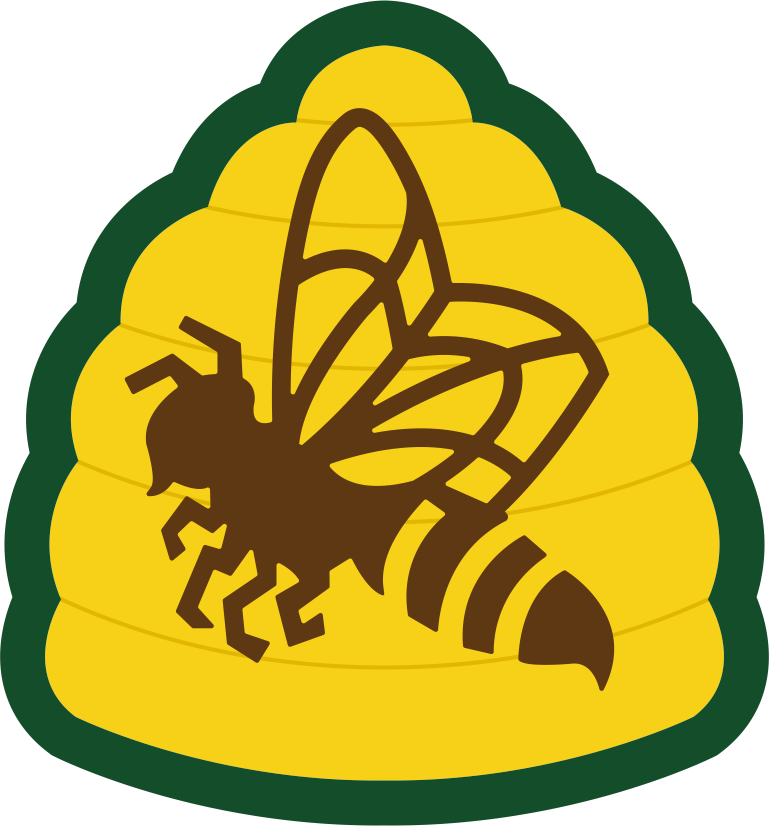
- Utah Army National Guard SSI (New)

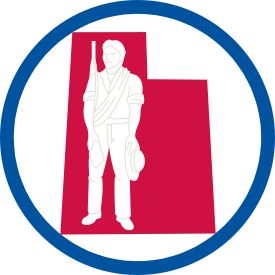
- Utah Army National Guard SSI (Old)

- Utah Army National Guard Crest

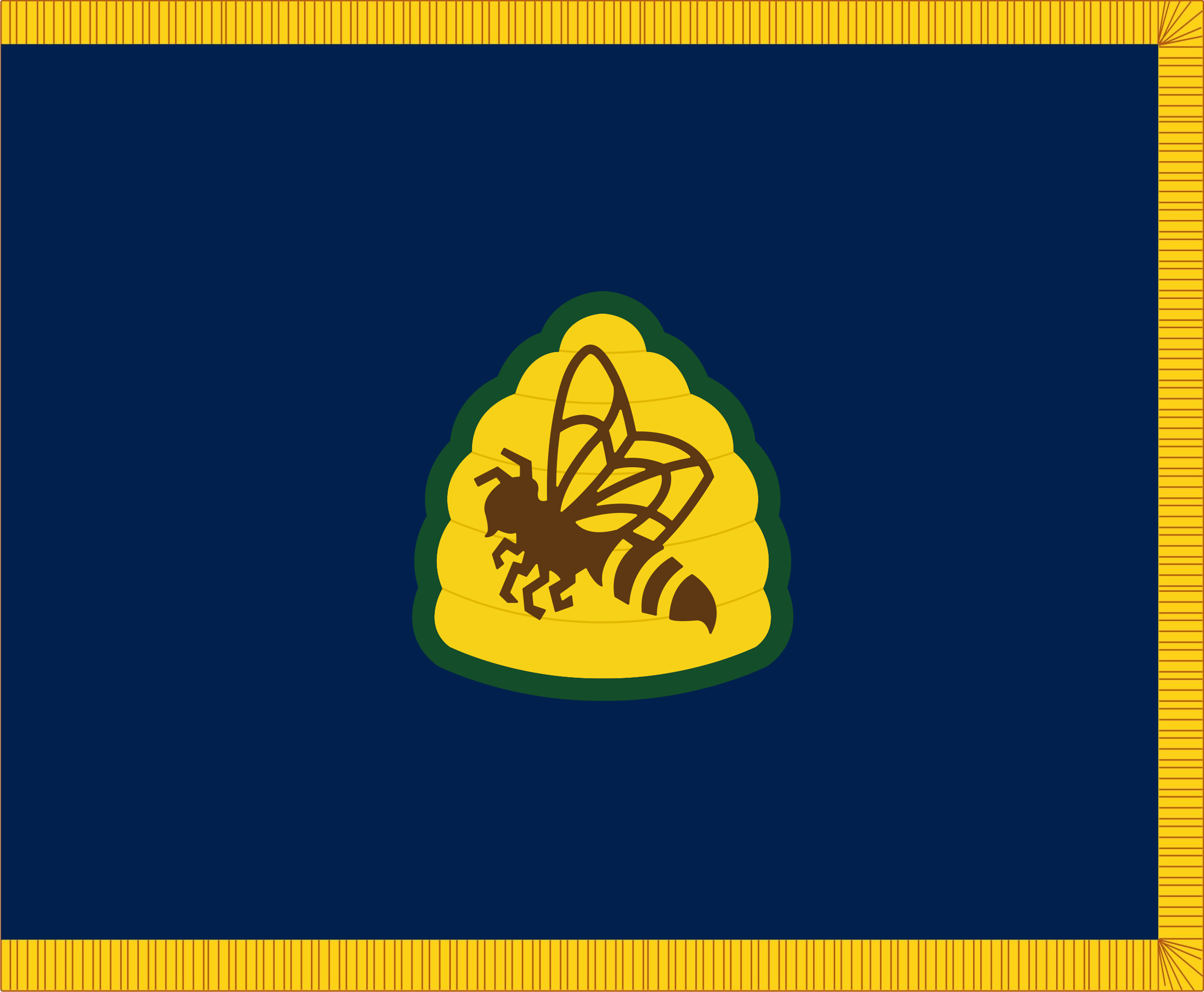
- Utah Army National Guard Headquarters Flag

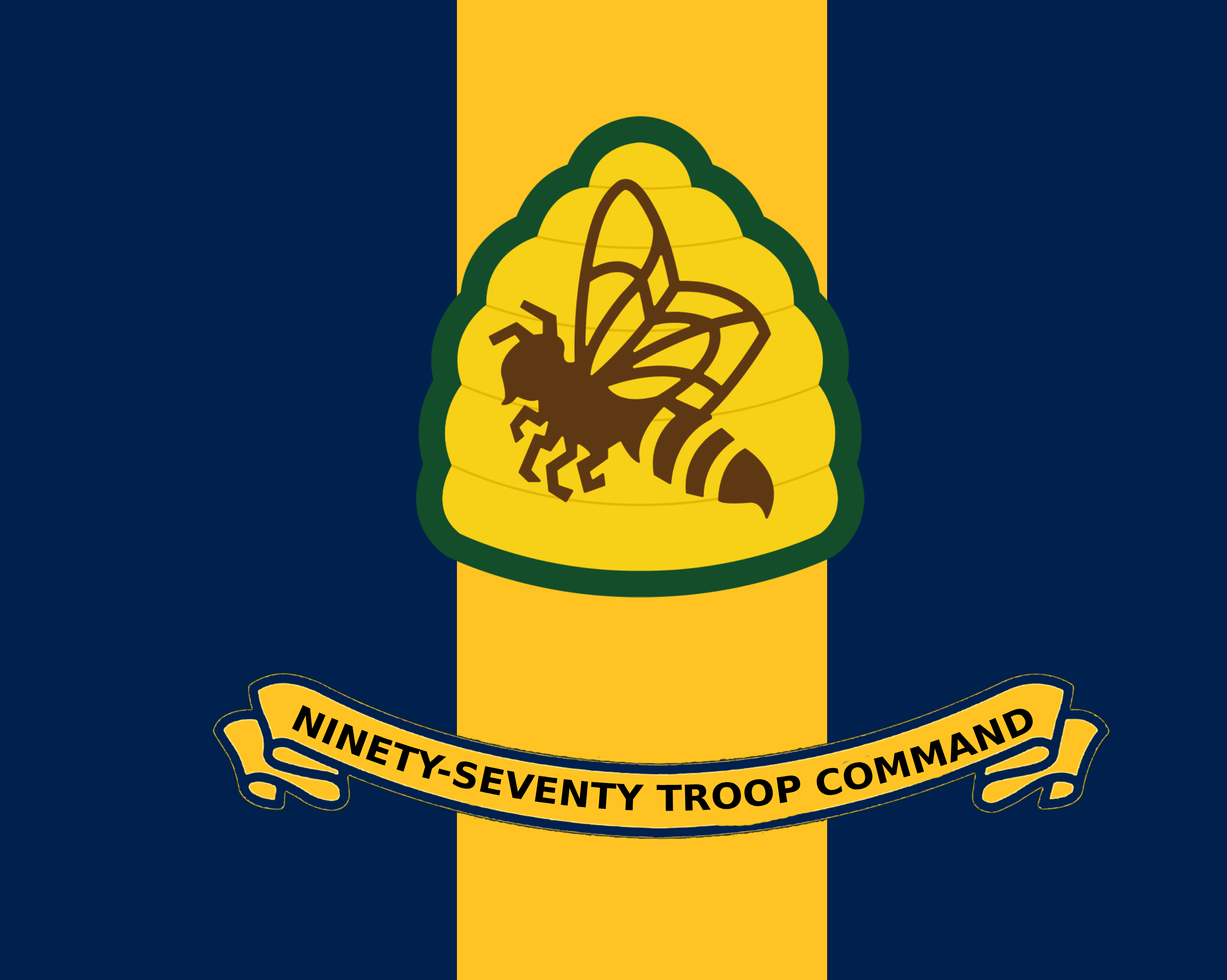
- Utah Army National Guard 97th Troop Command Flag (New)

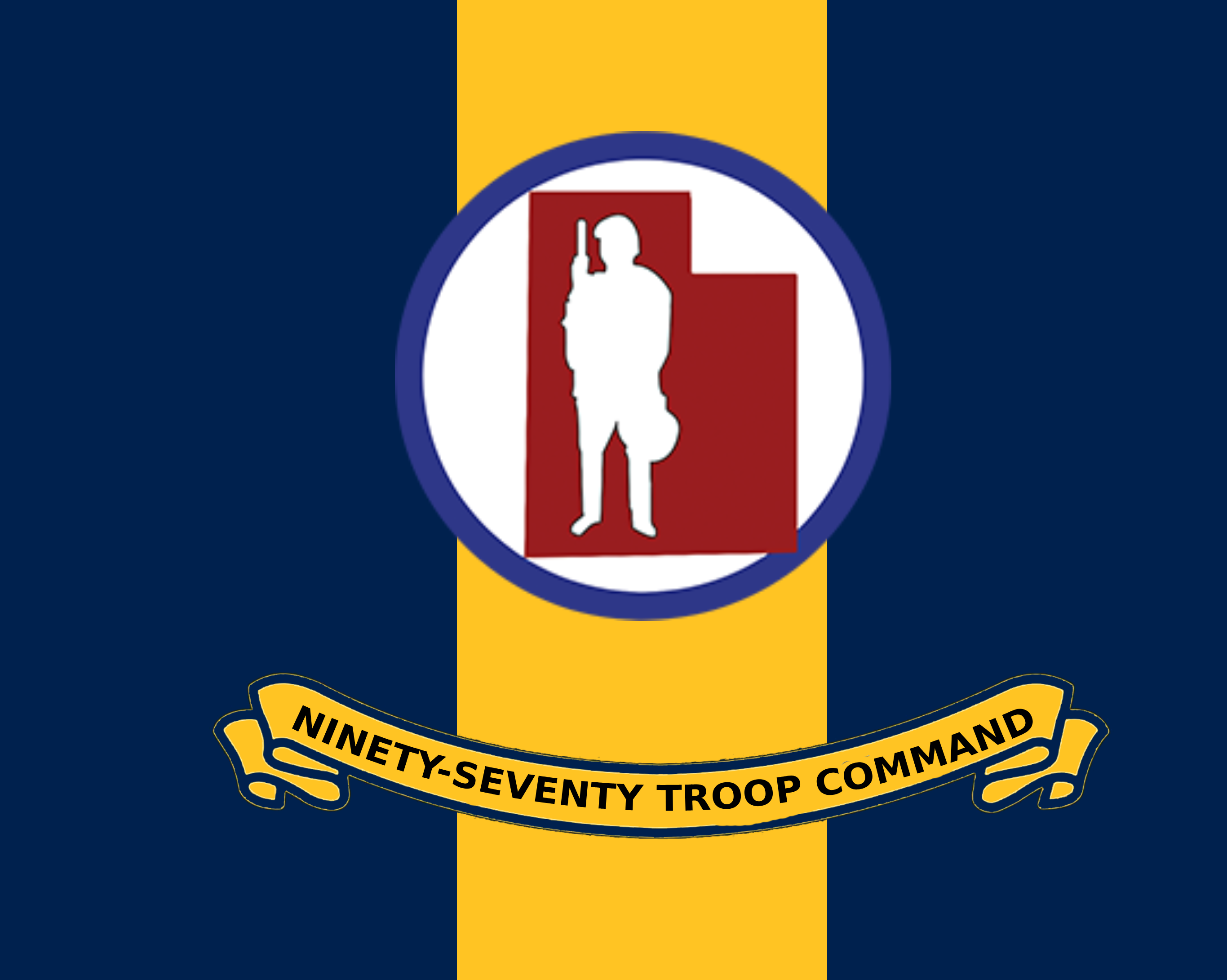
- Utah Army National Guard 97th Troop Command Flag (Old)

The Utah National Guard comprises both Army and Air National Guard components. The Constitution of the United States specifically charges the National Guard with dual federal and state missions. The National Guard is the only United States military force empowered to function in a state status.

The Utah Army National Guard maintains 30 armories in 27 communities.

The Utah Army National Guard is a component of the United States Army and the United States National Guard. Nationwide, the Army National Guard comprises approximately one half of the US Army's available combat forces and approximately one third of its support organization. National coordination of various state National Guard units are maintained through the National Guard Bureau.

== History ==
The Utah Army National Guard can trace its origins as far back as 1849. In 1847, as Mormon settlers began arriving in what become known as Utah, it was realized that some sort of militia would be needed to protect the new settlements. The core of this new militia were former members of the Nauvoo Legion, which was formed in Nauvoo, Illinois, around 1840. For a number of years members of the Utah-based militia could be seen wearing elements of the old Nauvoo Legion uniforms. This new Utah based militia would also be referred to as the Nauvoo Legion. Some of the Utah-based Nauvoo Legion would carry lances, giving them a unique look when on horseback. Members of the Mormon Battalion, after finally arriving in Utah after the end of the Mexican–American War, would also join the new Nauvoo Legion.

The Nauvoo Legion would have been involved in the stillborn conflict between Mormons and Federal forces sent to Utah in the late 1850s. After it was apparent no major hostilities would break out, a somewhat more conciliatory relationship developed between Federal troops and the Legion.

In 1857 Nauvoo Legion members in Iron County participated in the murder of 120 immigrants moving through Utah to California. This event is known as the Mountain Meadows massacre. The Utah-based Nauvoo Legion participated in numerous efforts to quell problems with Indians, and also did certain protective duties in Utah during the Civil War.

As non-Mormon settlers and U.S. Government officials began to grow in numbers, it was perceived that the Nauvoo Legion was loyal mainly to the LDS church and Brigham Young, and not to the Utah territorial government. This perception was more acute after Brigham Young was removed as the territorial governor and a non-Mormon replaced him. The Utah militia was disbanded around 1887, and for a time a more direct control over any military matters was maintained directly by the Federal government. In 1894 the Utah National Guard was created, and since that time has operated in a purely secular manner. The Militia Act of 1903 organized the various state militias into the present National Guard system.

See History of the United States National Guard for a more complete history of the guard at a national level.

On January 19, 2021, the Utah National Guard, in cooperation with the Utah Department of Health, administered COVID-19 vaccinations to Guard members and the civilian population. A team of Utah National Guard soldiers and Airmen administered vaccines to civilians that are 70 years or older in Utah County. Captain Jeremy Metzger said they administered 1,400 vaccines at one of their locations.

The Utah Army National Guard was previously led by adjutant general Michael Turley. In 2023, Turley was recently placed on leave while under investigation for having an inappropriate relationship with a subordinate soldier. On August 21, 2023, Governor Cox appointed Brig. Gen. Daniel Boyack as the new adjutant general of the Utah National Guard.

Since 2023, the Utah Army National Guard has undertakes a series a series of initiatives to modernize its capabilities and expand its force structure. These have included participation in joint preparedness exercises, cybersecurity and homeland defense training and updates to medical and leadership development programs. the unit's aviation capabilities were expanded with the addition of new AH-64 Apache helicopters. In addition the guard announced the formation of a new battalion, adding more than 700 soldiers and intended to support both state emergency response and federal defense missions.

Previously active units of the Utah ARNG have included:

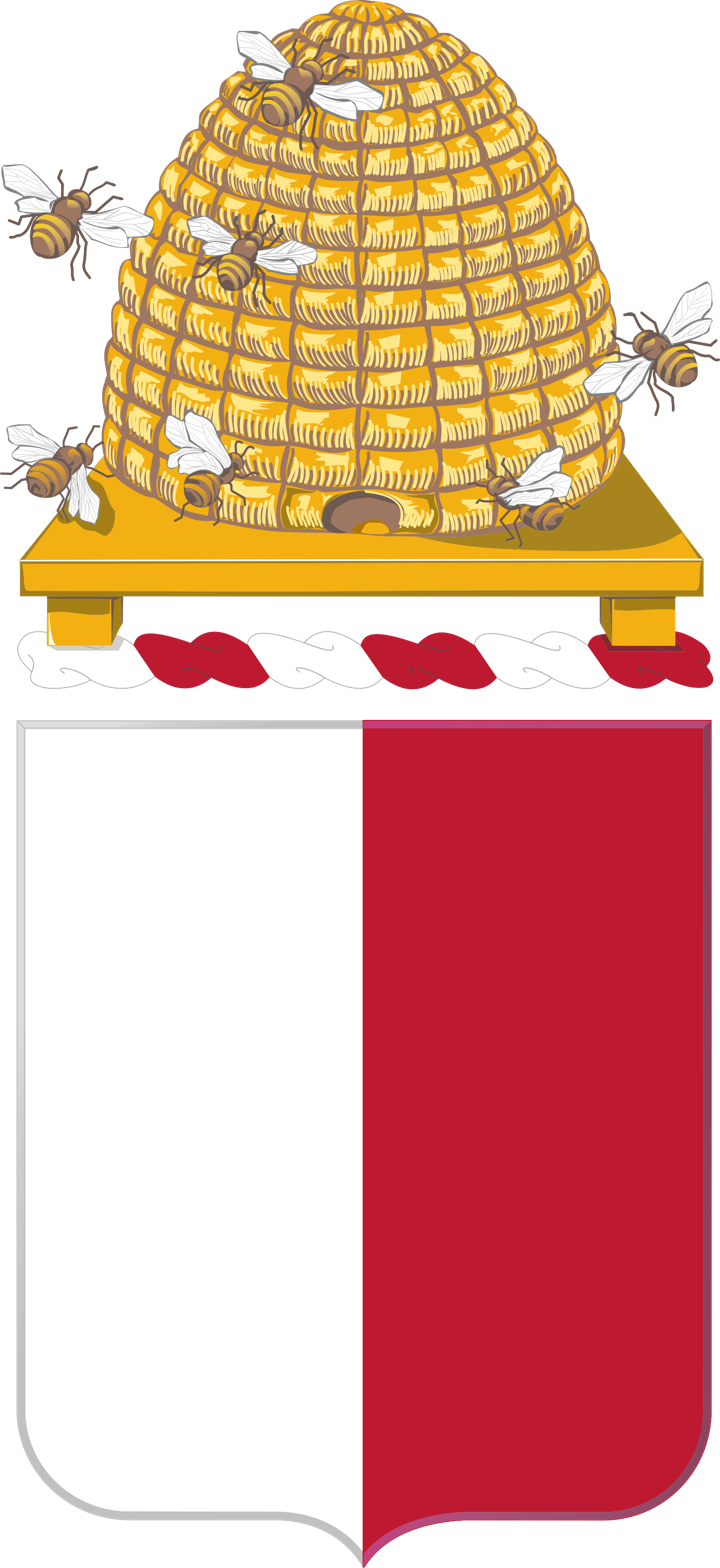
- 115th Engineer Battalion
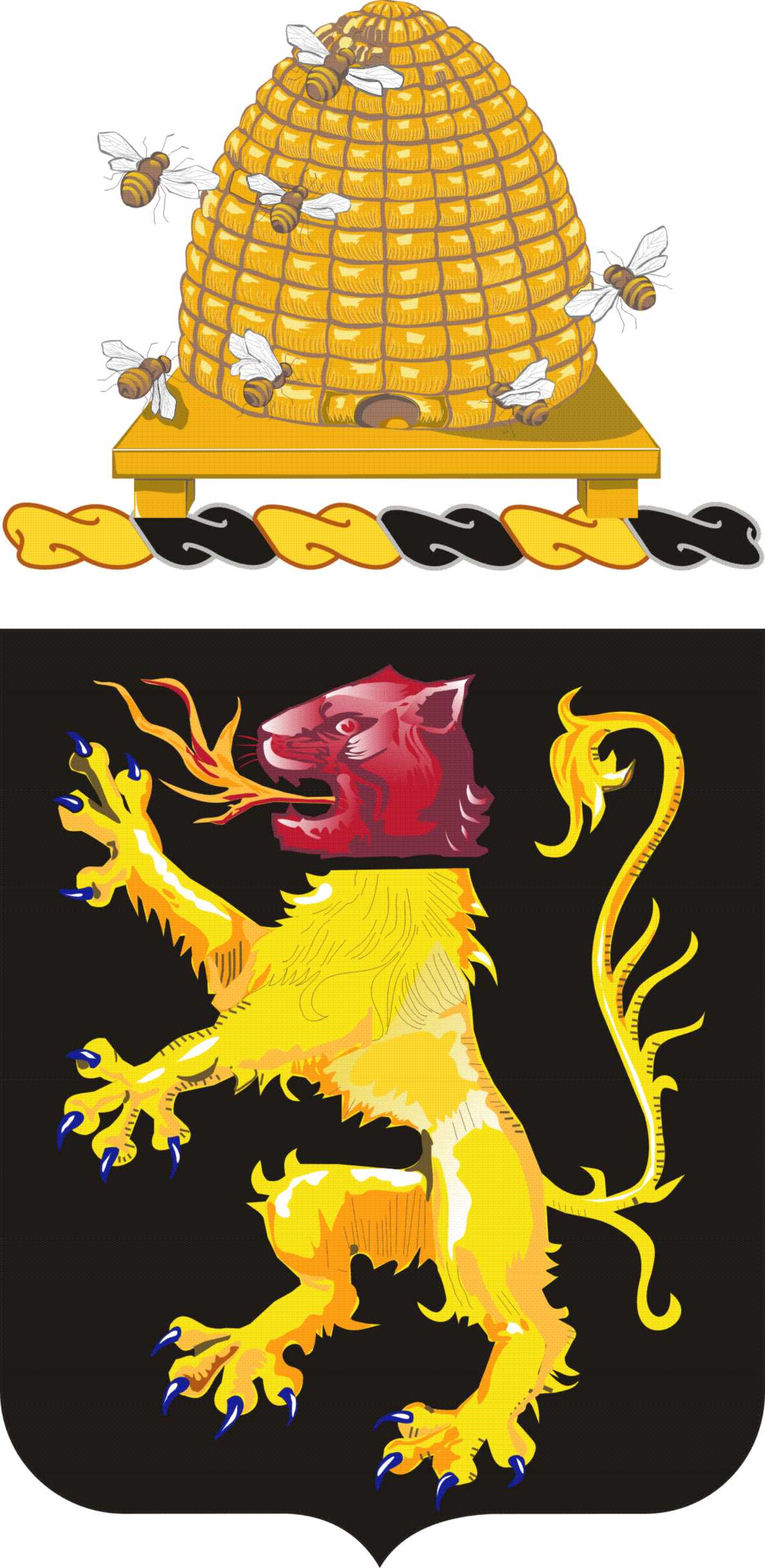
- 140th Field Artillery Regiment
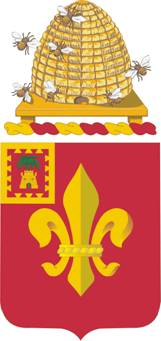
- 145th Field Artillery Regiment
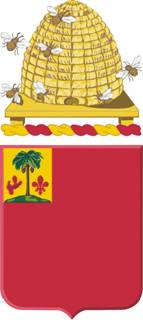
- 222nd Field Artillery Regiment

== Units in June 2026 ==
As of February 2026 the Utah Army National Guard consists of the following units:

- Joint Force Headquarters-Utah, Army Element, in Draper
  - Headquarters and Headquarters Detachment, Joint Force Headquarters-Utah, Army Element, in Draper
  - Utah Recruiting & Retention Battalion, in Draper
  - Utah Medical Detachment, at Camp Williams
  - Utah Training Center, at Camp Williams
  - Army Aviation Support Facility #1, at South Valley Regional Airport
  - Combined Support Maintenance Shop #1, in Draper
  - Unit Training Equipment Site #1, at Camp Williams
  - 19th Special Forces Group (Airborne), at Camp Williams
    - Headquarters and Headquarters Company, 19th Special Forces Group (Airborne), at Camp Williams
    - Group Special Troops Company, 19th Special Forces Group (Airborne), at Camp Williams
      - Tactical Unmanned Aerial Systems Platoon, at Camp Williams
      - Advanced Skills Detachment, in Wendover
    - Military Intelligence Company, 19th Special Forces Group (Airborne), at Camp Williams
    - 190th Chemical Reconnaissance Detachment, at Fort William Henry Harrison (MT) — (Montana Army National Guard)
    - 1st Battalion, 19th Special Forces Group (Airborne), in Lehi
      - Headquarters and Headquarters Detachment, 1st Battalion, 19th Special Forces Group (Airborne), in Lehi
      - Company A, 1st Battalion, 19th Special Forces Group (Airborne), in Buckley (WA) — (Washington Army National Guard)
      - Company B, 1st Battalion, 19th Special Forces Group (Airborne), at Camp Williams
      - Company C, 1st Battalion, 19th Special Forces Group (Airborne), at Joint Forces Training Base – Los Alamitos (CA) — (California Army National Guard)
      - Company D (Support), 1st Battalion, 19th Special Forces Group (Airborne), in Lehi
        - Detachment 1, Company D (Support), 1st Battalion, 19th Special Forces Group (Airborne), in Buckley (WA) — (Washington Army National Guard)
      - Company E (Forward Support), 1st Battalion, 19th Special Forces Group (Airborne), in Lehi
    - 2nd Battalion, 19th Special Forces Group (Airborne), in Kenova (WV) — (West Virginia Army National Guard)
    - 5th Battalion, 19th Special Forces Group (Airborne), in Watkins (CO) — (Colorado Army National Guard)
    - Group Support Battalion, 19th Special Forces Group (Airborne), in Ogden
      - Headquarters and Headquarters Detachment, Group Support Battalion, 19th Special Forces Group (Airborne), in Ogden
      - Company A, Group Support Battalion, 19th Special Forces Group (Airborne), in Ogden
      - Company B, Group Support Battalion, 19th Special Forces Group (Airborne), in Ogden
      - Company C, Group Support Battalion, 19th Special Forces Group (Airborne), at Camp Williams
      - Company D, Group Support Battalion, 19th Special Forces Group (Airborne), at Camp Williams
  - 65th Field Artillery Brigade, at Camp Williams
    - Headquarters and Headquarters Battery, 65th Field Artillery Brigade, at Camp Williams
    - 5th Battalion, 113th Field Artillery Regiment, in Louisburg (NC) (M142 HIMARS) — (North Carolina Army National Guard)
    - 1st Battalion, 145th Field Artillery Regiment, in Spanish Fork (M109A6 Paladin)
      - Headquarters and Headquarters Battery, 1st Battalion, 145th Field Artillery Regiment, in Spanish Fork
      - Battery A, 1st Battalion, 145th Field Artillery Regiment, in Brigham City
      - Battery B, 1st Battalion, 145th Field Artillery Regiment, in Manti
      - Battery C, 1st Battalion, 145th Field Artillery Regiment, in Spanish Fork
      - 214th Forward Support Company, in Tooele
    - 2nd Battalion, 222nd Field Artillery Regiment, in Cedar City (M109A6 Paladin)
      - Headquarters and Headquarters Battery, 2nd Battalion, 222nd Field Artillery Regiment, in Cedar City
      - Battery A, 2nd Battalion, 222nd Field Artillery Regiment, in Richfield
      - Battery B, 2nd Battalion, 222nd Field Artillery Regiment, in St. George
      - Battery C, 2nd Battalion, 222nd Field Artillery Regiment, in Beaver
      - 213th Forward Support Company, in St. George
    - 340th Brigade Support Battalion, in Seaside (CA) — (California Army National Guard)
      - 190th Signal Company, at Camp Williams
  - 97th Troop Command, in Draper
    - 23rd Army Band, in Lehi
    - 85th Civil Support Team (WMD), in Salt Lake City
    - 128th Mobile Public Affairs Detachment, in Lehi
    - Detachment 3, Cyber Protection Team 174, in Draper
    - 653rd Judge Advocate Trial Defense Team, in Draper
    - 625th Military Police Battalion, in Springville
      - Headquarters and Headquarters Detachment, 625th Military Police Battalion, in Springville
      - 115th Ordnance Company (Support Maintenance), in Draper
      - 118th Transportation Company (Medium Truck) (Cargo), in Price
        - Detachment 1, 118th Transportation Company (Medium Truck) (Cargo), in Vernal
      - 144th Medical Company (Area Support), at Camp Williams
      - 420th Military Police Company (Combat Support), in Salt Lake City
  - 97th Aviation Troop Command, at South Valley Airport
    - Headquarters and Headquarters Company, 97th Aviation Troop Command, at South Valley Airport
    - Detachment 2, Company B, 1st Battalion (Security & Support), 112th Aviation Regiment, at South Valley Airport (UH-72A Lakota)
    - Detachment 4, Company C, 2nd Battalion (Fixed Wing), 641st Aviation Regiment (Detachment 50, Operational Support Airlift Activity), at Wright Air National Guard Base (C-12 Huron)
    - 1st Battalion (Attack Reconnaissance), 211th Aviation Regiment, at South Valley Airport (part of 40th Combat Aviation Brigade)
      - Headquarters and Headquarters Company, 1st Battalion (Attack Reconnaissance), 211th Aviation Regiment, at South Valley Airport
      - Company A, 1st Battalion (Attack Reconnaissance), 211th Aviation Regiment, at South Valley Airport (AH-64E Apache)
      - Company B, 1st Battalion (Attack Reconnaissance), 211th Aviation Regiment, at South Valley Airport (AH-64E Apache)
      - Company C, 1st Battalion (Attack Reconnaissance), 211th Aviation Regiment, at South Valley Airport (AH-64E Apache)
      - Company D (AVUM), 1st Battalion (Attack Reconnaissance), 211th Aviation Regiment, at South Valley Airport
      - Company E (Forward Support), 1st Battalion (Attack Reconnaissance), 211th Aviation Regiment, at South Valley Airport
    - 2nd Battalion (General Support Aviation), 211th Aviation Regiment, at South Valley Airport (part of 35th Combat Aviation Brigade)
      - Headquarters and Headquarters Company, 2nd Battalion (General Support Aviation), 211th Aviation Regiment, at South Valley Airport
        - Detachment 1, Headquarters and Headquarters Company, 2nd Battalion (General Support Aviation), 211th Aviation Regiment, at Wheeler Army Airfield (HI) — (Hawaii Army National Guard)
        - Detachment 2, Headquarters and Headquarters Company, 2nd Battalion (General Support Aviation), 211th Aviation Regiment, at St. Cloud Airport (MN) — (Minnesota Army National Guard)
        - Detachment 3, Headquarters and Headquarters Company, 2nd Battalion (General Support Aviation), 211th Aviation Regiment, at Waterloo Airport (IA) — (Iowa Army National Guard)
        - Detachment 4, Headquarters and Headquarters Company, 2nd Battalion (General Support Aviation), 211th Aviation Regiment, at Bryant Army Heliport (AK) — (Alaska Army National Guard)
      - Company A (CAC), 2nd Battalion (General Support Aviation), 211th Aviation Regiment, at South Valley Airport (UH-60L Black Hawk)
      - Company B (Heavy Lift), 2nd Battalion (General Support Aviation), 211th Aviation Regiment, at Wheeler Army Airfield (HI) (CH-47F Chinook) — (Hawaii Army National Guard)
        - Detachment 1, Company B (Heavy Lift), 2nd Battalion (General Support Aviation), 211th Aviation Regiment, at Bryant Army Heliport (AK) — (Alaska Army National Guard)
      - Company C (MEDEVAC), 2nd Battalion (General Support Aviation), 211th Aviation Regiment, at St. Cloud Airport (MN) (HH-60L Black Hawk) — (Minnesota Army National Guard)
        - Detachment 1, Company C (MEDEVAC), 2nd Battalion (General Support Aviation), 211th Aviation Regiment, at Waterloo Airport (IA) — (Iowa Army National Guard)
      - Company D (AVUM), 2nd Battalion (General Support Aviation), 211th Aviation Regiment, at South Valley Airport
        - Detachment 1, Company D (AVUM), 2nd Battalion (General Support Aviation), 211th Aviation Regiment, at Wheeler Army Airfield (HI) — (Hawaii Army National Guard)
        - Detachment 2, Company D (AVUM), 2nd Battalion (General Support Aviation), 211th Aviation Regiment, at St. Cloud Airport (MN) — (Minnesota Army National Guard)
        - Detachment 3, Company D (AVUM), 2nd Battalion (General Support Aviation), 211th Aviation Regiment, at Waterloo Airport (IA) — (Iowa Army National Guard)
        - Detachment 4, Company D (AVUM), 2nd Battalion (General Support Aviation), 211th Aviation Regiment, at Bryant Army Heliport (AK) — (Alaska Army National Guard)
        - Detachment 6, Company D (AVUM), 2nd Battalion (General Support Aviation), 211th Aviation Regiment, at Cheyenne Air National Guard Base (WY) — (Wyoming Army National Guard)
      - Company E (Forward Support), 2nd Battalion (General Support Aviation), 211th Aviation Regiment, at South Valley Airport
        - Detachment 1, Company E (Forward Support), 2nd Battalion (General Support Aviation), 211th Aviation Regiment, at Wheeler Army Airfield (HI) — (Hawaii Army National Guard)
        - Detachment 2, Company E (Forward Support), 2nd Battalion (General Support Aviation), 211th Aviation Regiment, at St. Cloud Airport (MN) — (Minnesota Army National Guard)
        - Detachment 3, Company E (Forward Support), 2nd Battalion (General Support Aviation), 211th Aviation Regiment, at Waterloo Airport (IA) — (Iowa Army National Guard)
        - Detachment 4, Company E (Forward Support), 2nd Battalion (General Support Aviation), 211th Aviation Regiment, at Bryant Army Heliport (AK) — (Alaska Army National Guard)
        - Detachment 6, Company E (Forward Support), 2nd Battalion (General Support Aviation), 211th Aviation Regiment, at Cheyenne Air National Guard Base (WY) — (Wyoming Army National Guard)
      - Company F (ATS), 2nd Battalion (General Support Aviation), 211th Aviation Regiment, at Robinson Army Airfield (AR) — (Arkansas Army National Guard)
      - Company G (MEDEVAC), 2nd Battalion (General Support Aviation), 211th Aviation Regiment, at Cheyenne Air National Guard Base (WY) (HH-60L Black Hawk) — (Wyoming Army National Guard)
        - Detachment 1, Company G (MEDEVAC), 2nd Battalion (General Support Aviation), 211th Aviation Regiment, at Bryant Army Heliport (AK) — (Alaska Army National Guard)
        - Detachment 2, Company G (MEDEVAC), 2nd Battalion (General Support Aviation), 211th Aviation Regiment, at South Valley Airport
      - Detachment 4, Company B (AVIM), 449th Aviation Support Battalion, at South Valley Airport
  - 204th Maneuver Enhancement Brigade, at Camp Williams
    - Headquarters Support Company, 204th Maneuver Enhancement Brigade, at Camp Williams
    - 4th Infantry Division Main Command Post-Operational Detachment, at Camp Williams
    - 115th Engineer Detachment (Engineer Facility Detachment), in Nephi
    - 217th Signal Company, at Camp Williams
    - 1st Battalion, 204th Infantry Regiment, in Ogden (assigned to the 81st Mobile Brigade Combat Team)
      - Headquarters and Headquarters Company, 1st Battalion, 204th Infantry Regiment, in Ogden
      - Company A, 1st Battalion, 204th Infantry Regiment, in Logan
      - Company B, 1st Battalion, 204th Infantry Regiment, in Tooele
      - Company C, 1st Battalion, 204th Infantry Regiment, in St. George
      - Company D (Multi-purpose Company), 1st Battalion, 204th Infantry Regiment, in Ogden
      - Company E (Combat Logistic), 181st Light Support Battalion, in Ogden
    - 1457th Engineer Battalion, in Nephi
      - Headquarters and Headquarters Company, 1457th Engineer Battalion, in Nephi
      - Forward Support Company, 1457th Engineer Battalion, in Nephi
      - 116th Engineer Company (Engineer Construction Company), in Spanish Fork
        - Detachment 1, 116th Engineer Company (Engineer Construction Company), in Mount Pleasant
  - 300th Military Intelligence Brigade (Linguist), in Draper
    - Headquarters and Headquarters Company, 300th Military Intelligence Brigade (Linguist), in Draper
    - 141st Military Intelligence Battalion (Linguist), in Orem
      - Headquarters and Headquarters Company, 141st Military Intelligence Battalion (Linguist), in Orem
      - Company A, 141st Military Intelligence Battalion (Linguist), in St. George
      - Company B, 141st Military Intelligence Battalion (Linguist), in Orem
      - Intelligence Coordination (IC) Detachment, 141st Military Intelligence Battalion (Linguist), in Orem
      - Company D, 141st Military Intelligence Battalion (Linguist), in Draper
      - Company E, 141st Military Intelligence Battalion (Linguist), in Draper
    - 142nd Military Intelligence Battalion (Linguist), in North Salt Lake
      - Headquarters and Headquarters Company, 142nd Military Intelligence Battalion (Linguist), in North Salt Lake
      - Company A, 142nd Military Intelligence Battalion (Linguist), at Camp Williams
      - Company B, 142nd Military Intelligence Battalion (Linguist), in Logan
      - Intelligence Coordination (IC) Detachment, 142nd Military Intelligence Battalion (Linguist), in North Salt Lake
      - Company D, 142nd Military Intelligence Battalion (Linguist), in Ogden
      - Company E, 142nd Military Intelligence Battalion (Linguist), in Ogden
    - 223rd Military Intelligence Battalion (Linguist), in San Francisco (CA) — (California Army National Guard)
    - 260th Military Intelligence Battalion (Linguist), in Miami (FL) — (Florida Army National Guard)
    - 341st Military Intelligence Battalion (Linguist), at Joint Base Lewis–McChord (WA) — (Washington Army National Guard)
  - 640th Regiment, Regional Training Institute, at Camp Williams
    - 1st Battalion, Noncommissioned Officers Academy
    - 2nd Battalion, Signals
    - 3nd Battalion, Artillery
    - 4th Battalion, Military Intelligence

Aviation unit abbreviations: CAC — Command Aviation Company; MEDEVAC — Medical evacuation; AVUM — Aviation Unit Maintenance; AVIM — Aviation Intermediate Maintenance; ATS — Air Traffic Service

== See also ==
- Utah State Defense Force
- Militia
- 36th Combat Aviation Brigade—approx. 40 Utah ARNG soldiers deployed to Iraq with the 36th CAB in Sep 2006.
- Transformation of the Army National Guard
