= 300th Military Intelligence Brigade =

American linguistic support unit

300th Military Intelligence Brigade (Linguist)
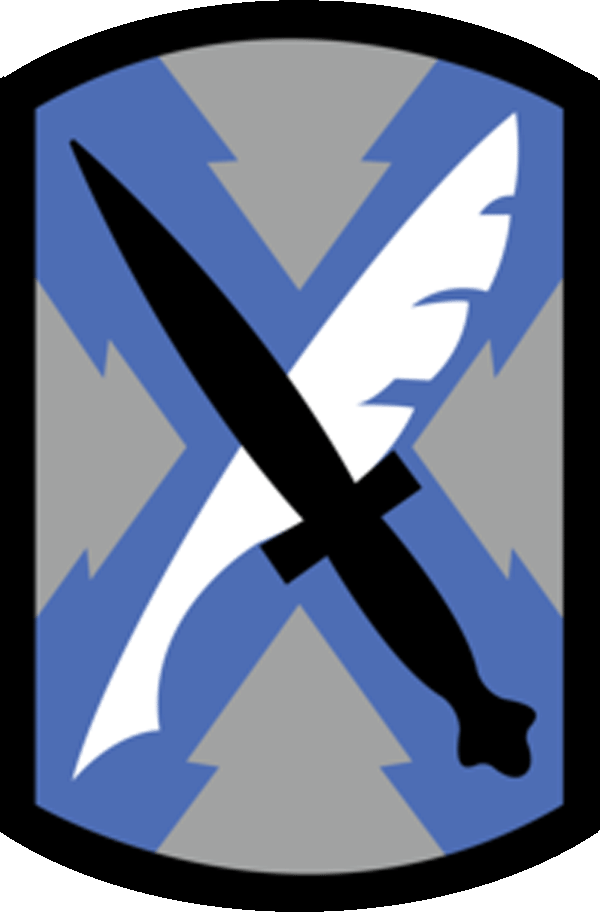
- 300th MIB shoulder sleeve insignia
- Active: 1988 – present
- Country: United States
- Allegiance: Utah Army National Guard
- Branch: United States Army National Guard
- Type: Military intelligence
- Role: Linguistics
- Size: 1400
- Part of: United States Army Intelligence and Security Command
- Garrison/HQ: Draper, Utah

Insignia
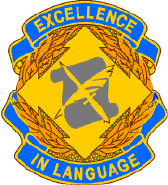
- Distinctive unit insignia

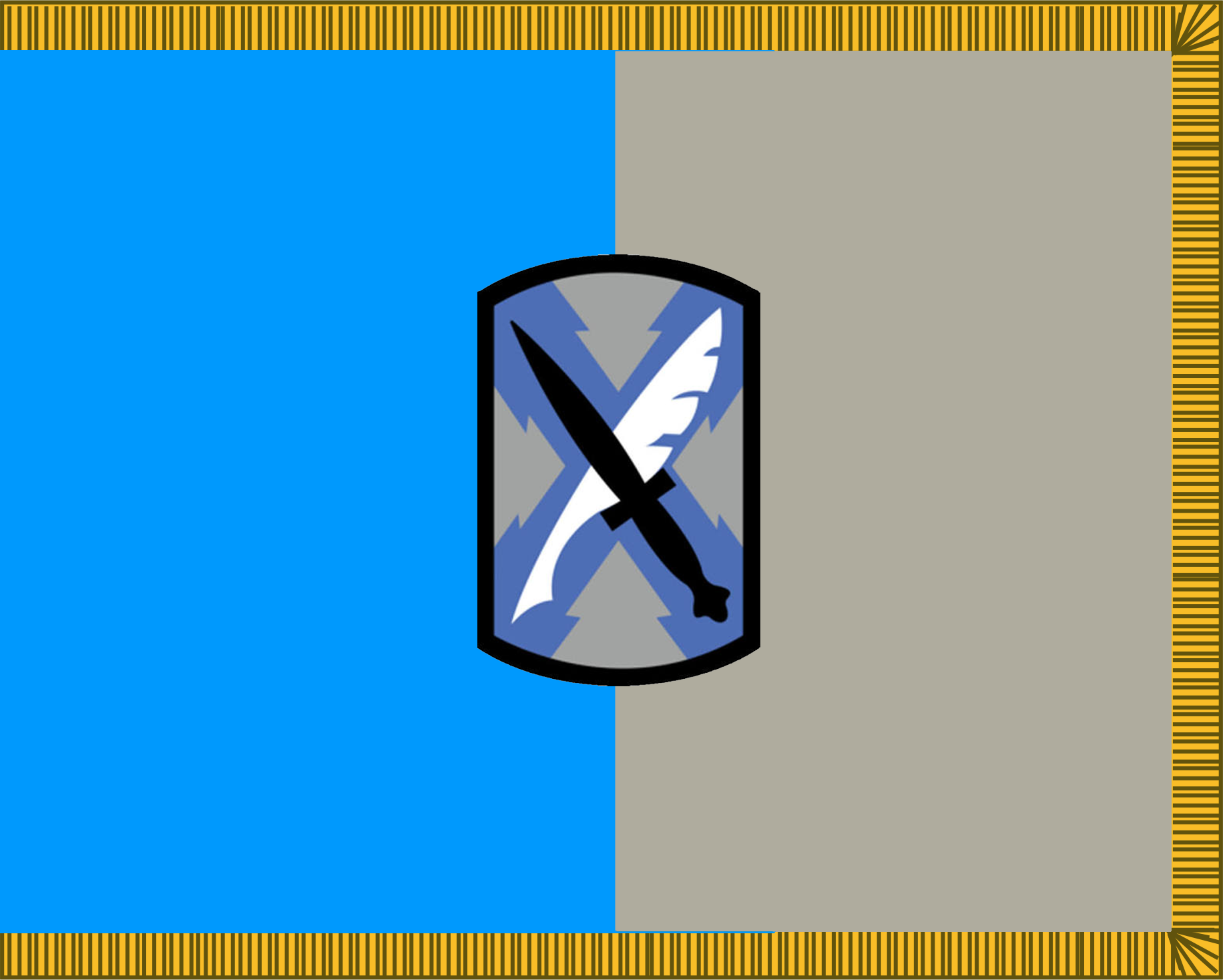
- 300th Military Intelligence Brigade Flag

The 300th Military Intelligence Brigade (Linguist) is a United States Army formation, subordinate to the United States Army Intelligence and Security Command (INSCOM). It is part of the Utah Army National Guard and headquartered at the Utah National Guard Headquarters building in Draper, Utah.

Formed in 1988 from the 142nd Military Intelligence Battalion, the 300th provides linguistic support to the U.S. Army throughout the world. Numbering approximately 1400, with approximately 90% being trained Army linguists, the soldiers are organized as five-person teams, trained in HUMINT (such as interrogators), counterintelligence, and SIGINT (such as voice intercept and analyst) skills. The brigade covers 19 documented languages, heavily oriented toward Arabic, Persian, and Korean.

== Order of Battle ==
- Headquarters and Headquarters Company (Utah Army National Guard)
- 141st Military Intelligence Battalion (Linguist) (Utah Army National Guard)
- 142nd Military Intelligence Battalion (Linguist) (Utah Army National Guard)
- 223rd Military Intelligence Battalion (Linguist) (California Army National Guard)
- 260th Military Intelligence Battalion (Linguist) (Florida Army National Guard)
- 341st Military Intelligence Battalion (Linguist) (Washington Army National Guard)

== Service ==
Units have taken part in U.S. military operations worldwide from the Gulf War to current operations in Bosnia-Herzegovina, Kosovo, Iraq, Kuwait and Afghanistan, and played a major role in protecting the 2002 Olympic Winter Games in Salt Lake City.

== See also ==
- Central Security Service
- Defense Language Institute
- Military Intelligence Service (United States)
- Military Intelligence Corps (United States Army)
