= 204th Maneuver Enhancement Brigade =

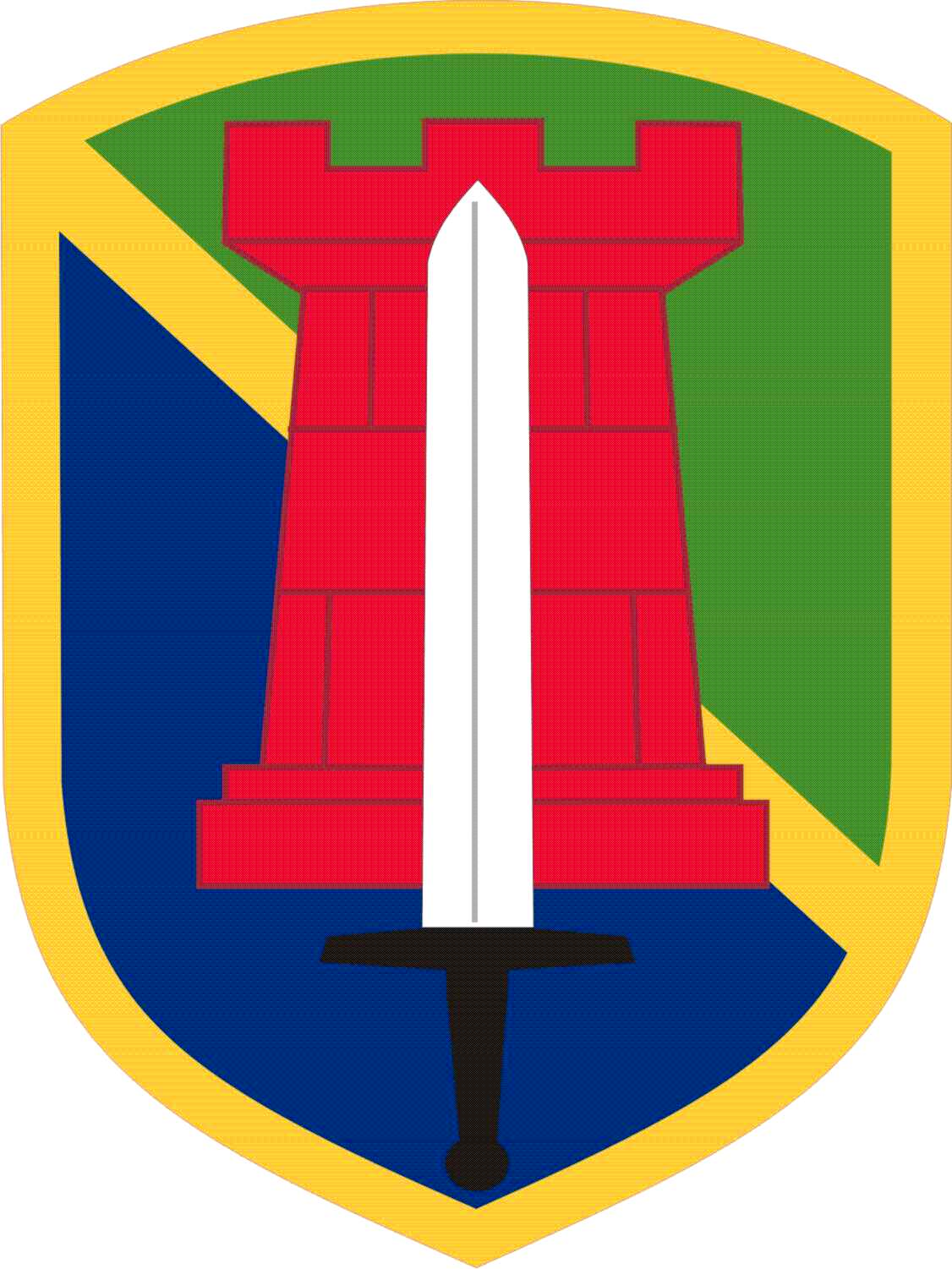
- Active: 2010-present
- Country: United States
- Branch: United States Army National Guard
- Role: Maneuver Enhancement
- Size: Brigade
- Part of: Utah Army National Guard
- Garrison/HQ: Camp Williams, Utah
- Motto: Solidarity In Purpose
- Website: https://www.facebook.com/THE204thMEB/

Commanders
- Current commander: Col. Woodrow Miner
- Command Sergeant Major: CSM Kevin Mayes

Insignia
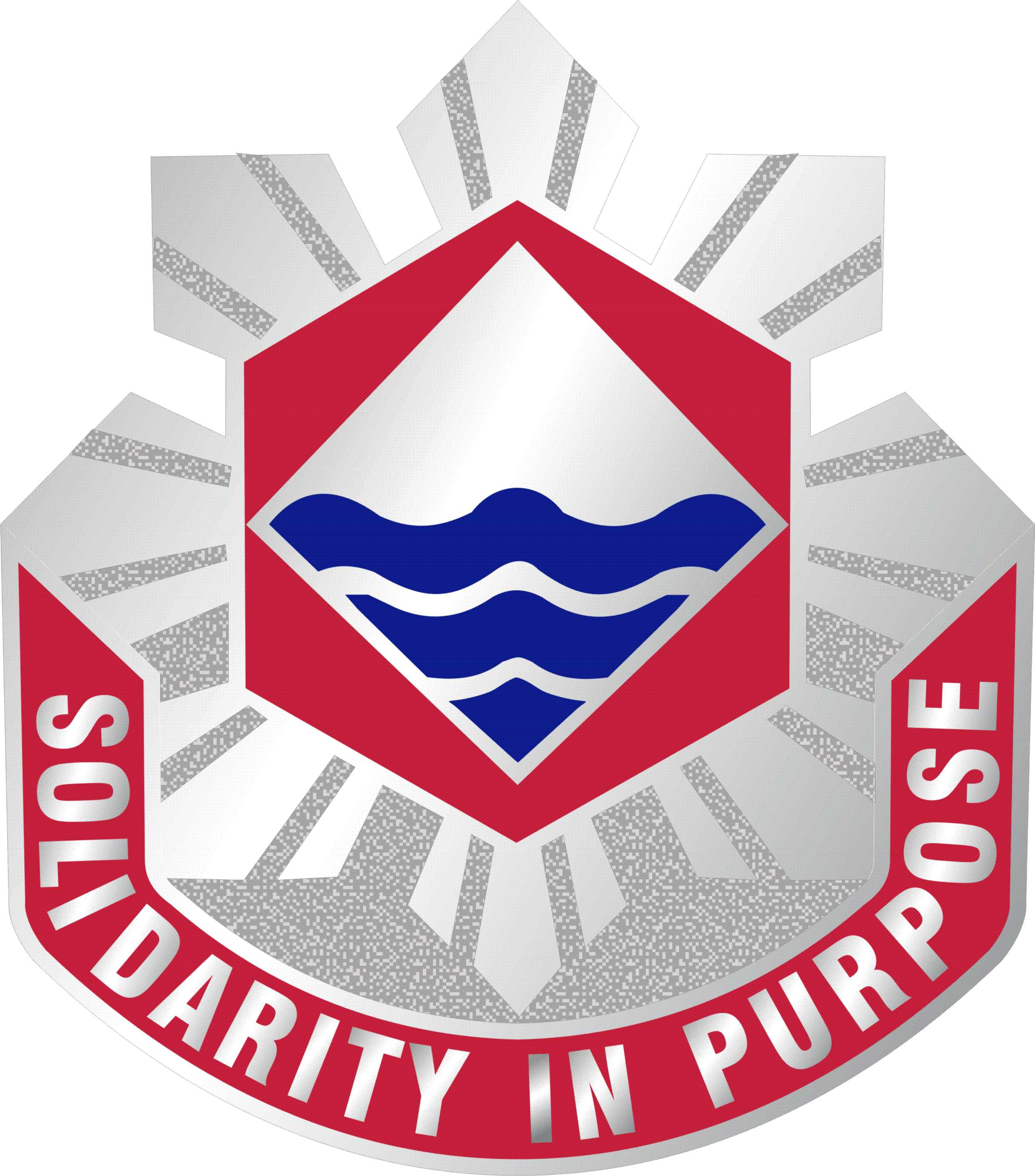
- 204th Maneuver Enhancement Brigade DUI

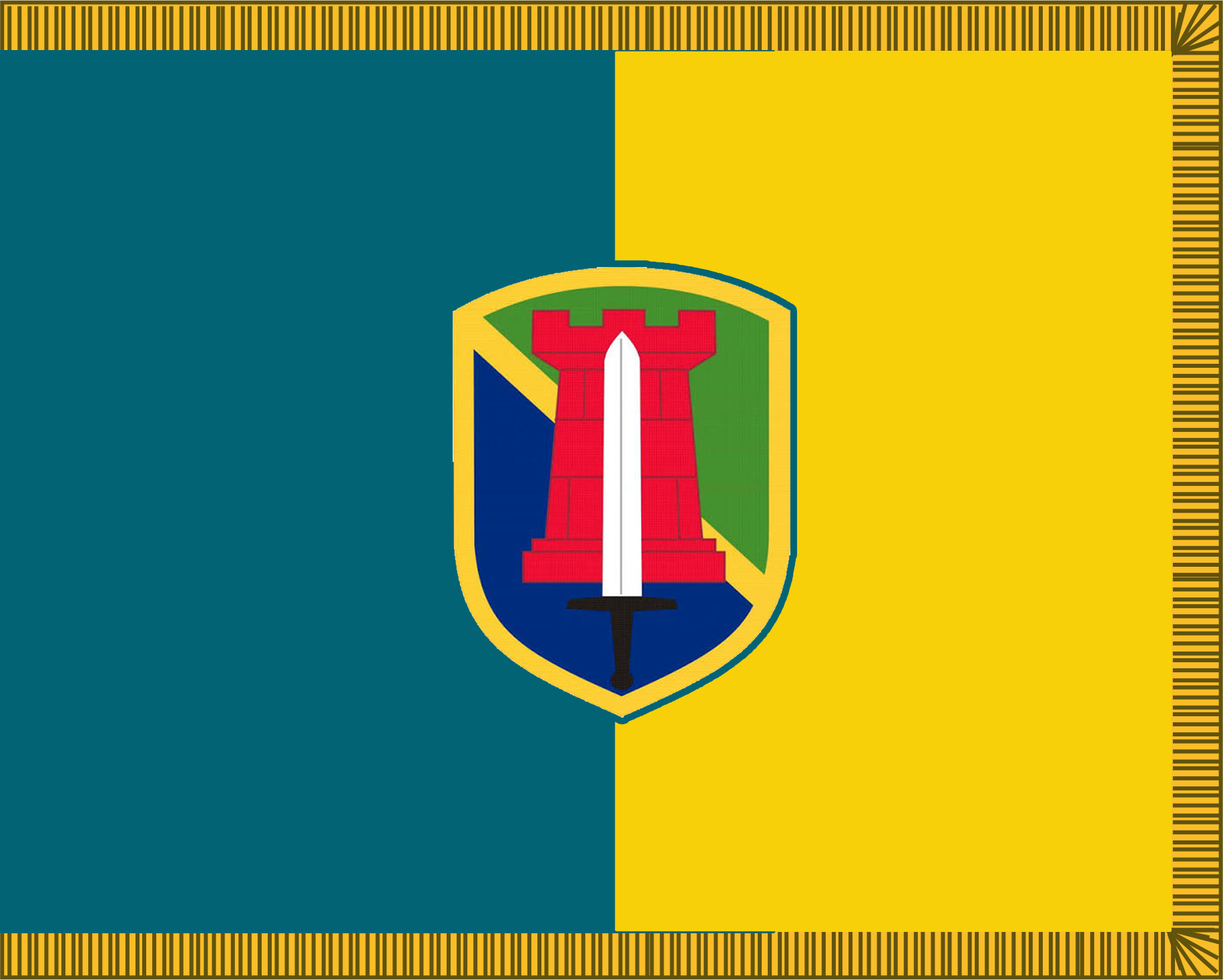
- 204th Maneuver Enhancement Brigade Flag

The 204th Maneuver Enhancement Brigade is a unit of the Utah Army National Guard since 2010. The mission of the 204 MEB is to support and protect brigade combat teams and other support brigades. In 2024, soldiers of the unit staffed the headquarters of Combined Joint Task Force-Horn of Africa. In 2025, soldiers of the brigade were deployed to Djibouti in East Africa supporting US and allied forces and US Embassies.

== Subordinate Units ==
- Headquarters Support Company Camp W.G. Williams | Riverton
  - 217th Signal Company
  - 115th Engineer Facilities Detachment Camp W.G. Williams | Riverton
- 1457th Engineer Battalion
  - Headquarters and Headquarters Company American Fork Armory | American Fork
  - 1457th Forward Supply Company American Fork Armory | American Fork
  - 116th Engineer Company Utah County South Armory | Spanish Fork
  - 116th Engineer Company, Detachment 1 Mount Pleasant Armory | Mount Pleasant
- Main Command Post Operational Detachment - 4ID
