= 223rd Military Intelligence Battalion (United States) =

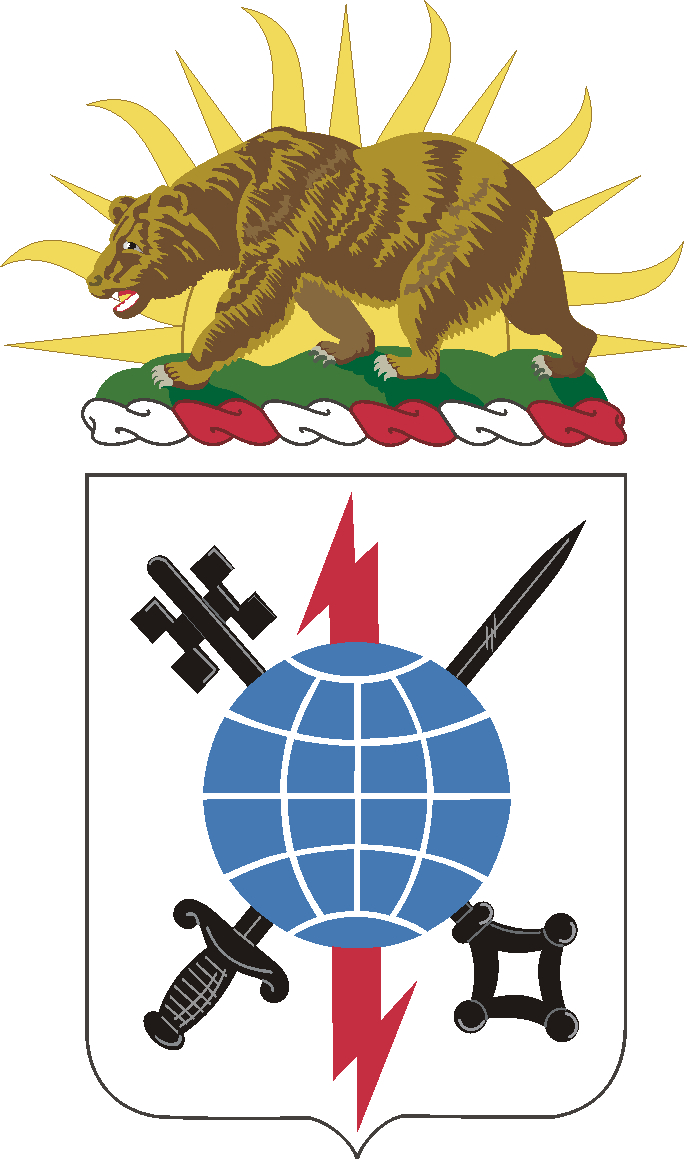
- 223rd Military Intelligence Battalion coat of arms
- Active: 1992–present
- Country: United States
- Branch: California Army National Guard
- Type: Intelligence
- Size: Battalion
- Garrison/HQ: San Francisco, California
- Motto: Insight through inquiry
- Engagements: Operation Iraqi Freedom
- Decorations: California Governor's Outstanding Unit Citation Detachment, 223rd Military Intelligence Battalion: Meritorious Unit Commendation (MUC); Detachment, Company A, 223rd Military Intelligence Battalion: Army Superior Unit Award (ASUA); Detachment, Company B, 223rd Military Intelligence Battalion: Valorous Unit Award; Meritorious Unit Commendation (MUC)

Commanders
- Commander: LTC David E. Brummett
- Command Sergeant Major: CSM Yolanda Aispuro-Duarte

Insignia
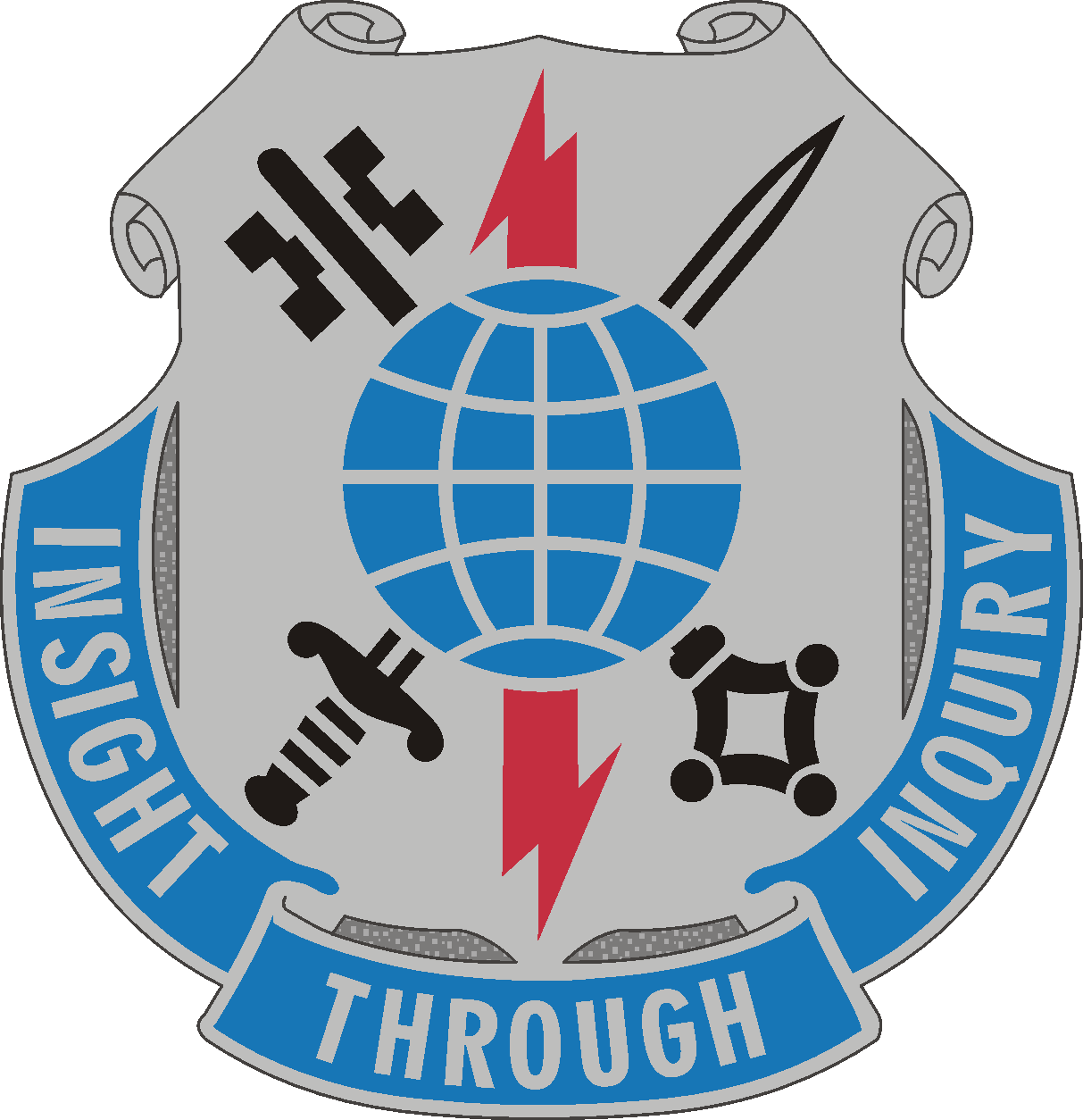
- Distinctive Unit Insignia

The 223rd Military Intelligence Battalion is a military intelligence battalion subordinate to the 300th Military Intelligence Brigade and part of the California Army National Guard.

== Mission ==
The battalion is tasked with providing linguists for human intelligence, counter-intelligence, and signals intelligence support, in addition to operating a center for language training and development. Like all National Guard units, the battalion can be called up for state duty by the state governor, ranging from support for anti-drug operations to providing linguists for interpretation and translation.

== History ==
The 223rd Military Intelligence Battalion was constituted on 1 June 1991 in the California Army National Guard, and organized and Federally recognized with its headquarters at Fort Funston in San Francisco on 16 January 1992. On 1 September 1997, its Company E was allotted to the Massachusetts Army National Guard; the latter was reorganized and redesignated as Company D on 1 October 2001. The battalion was ordered to active duty on 10 February 2003 for the 2003 invasion of Iraq, attached to the 205th Military Intelligence Brigade. The battalion returned to the United States and was released from active duty on 25 May 2004, reverting to state control.

Its mobilization for Operation United Assistance was announced in November 2014.

=== COVID-19 Humanitarian Mission ===
On 20 March 2020, California Governor Gavin Newsom alerted the California National Guard to be prepared to conduct a COVID-19 mission. The 223rd Military Intelligence Battalion was activated on emergency state active duty for the COVID-19 Humanitarian Mission and arrived at the Sacramento Food Bank to assist in packing food boxes for distribution, the following day. On Monday, 23 March 2020, the battalion was shifted to support food packing and distribution operations at Second Harvest of Silicon Valley in San Jose. The following day, the battalion began supporting two additional food bank locations; the Food Bank of Contra Costa and Solano County in Fairfield, CA and the Napa Food Bank in Napa, CA.

=== Panther Strike ===
As part of the 300th Military Intelligence Brigade, the battalion rotates the duty of hosting the brigade-level Exercise Panther Strike which it did last in 2014 and 2019. Panther Strike is a multi-national, multi-echelon military intelligence (MI) training exercise. The two-week exercise develops and enhances technical competence in counterintelligence (CI), human intelligence (HUMINT), geospatial intelligence (GEOINT), open source intelligence (OSINT), and signals intelligence (SIGINT) collective and individual tasks. Soldiers train in a realistic and challenging "train as they fight" non-garrison environment alongside NATO multi-national partners.

=== Army Combat Fitness Test ===
In October, 2018, the 223rd Military Intelligence Battalion was the first battalion in the National Guard to field test the Army Combat Fitness Test (ACFT).

== Subordinate units ==
The battalion includes the following units:

- Headquarters and Headquarters Detachment (San Francisco)
- Company A (San Rafael)
- Company B (San Francisco)
- IC Detachment (San Rafael)
- Company D (Ayer, Massachusetts under the Massachusetts National Guard's 151st Regional Support Group)

=== Company D ===
Company D, 223rd Military Intelligence Battalion, 300th Military Intelligence Brigade provides interpreters, translators, counter-intelligence, and interrogation support. They provide this support for the US Army, as well as the rest of the Intelligence Community.

The D Company is also tasked to operate a center for language training and development in the Massachusetts Army National Guard. It provides soldiers and equipment to support state missions as directed by the governor. These specific mission may vary widely, from counter-drug support to contingency missions; from interpretation and translation services to civil disorder and emergency operations.

D Company, thousands of miles from the rest of the battalion on the West Coast, is administered for local purposes by the 151st Regional Support Group, Massachusetts ANG. Recent deployment history include Kosovo Force-16 (Kosovo), Operation Enduring Freedom (Afghanistan), the Iraq War 2003-11, and Operation New Dawn (Iraq).
