= 65th Field Artillery Brigade =

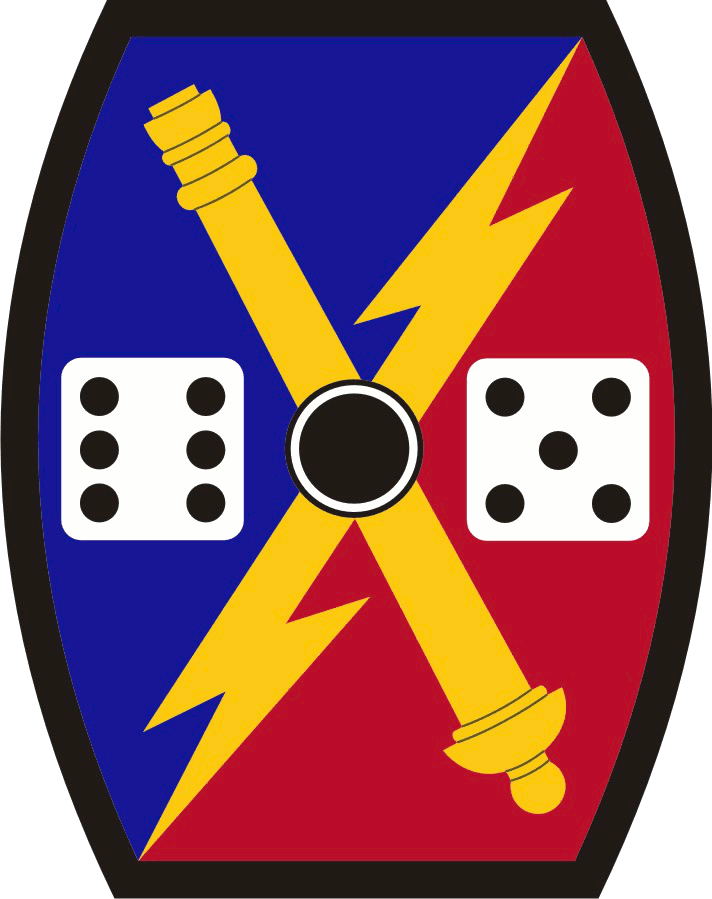
- Shoulder sleeve insignia.
- Country: United States
- Branch: United States Army National Guard
- Type: Field Artillery
- Size: Brigade
- Part of: Utah Army National Guard
- Garrison/HQ: Camp Williams, Riverton, Utah
- Motto: America's Thunder

Insignia
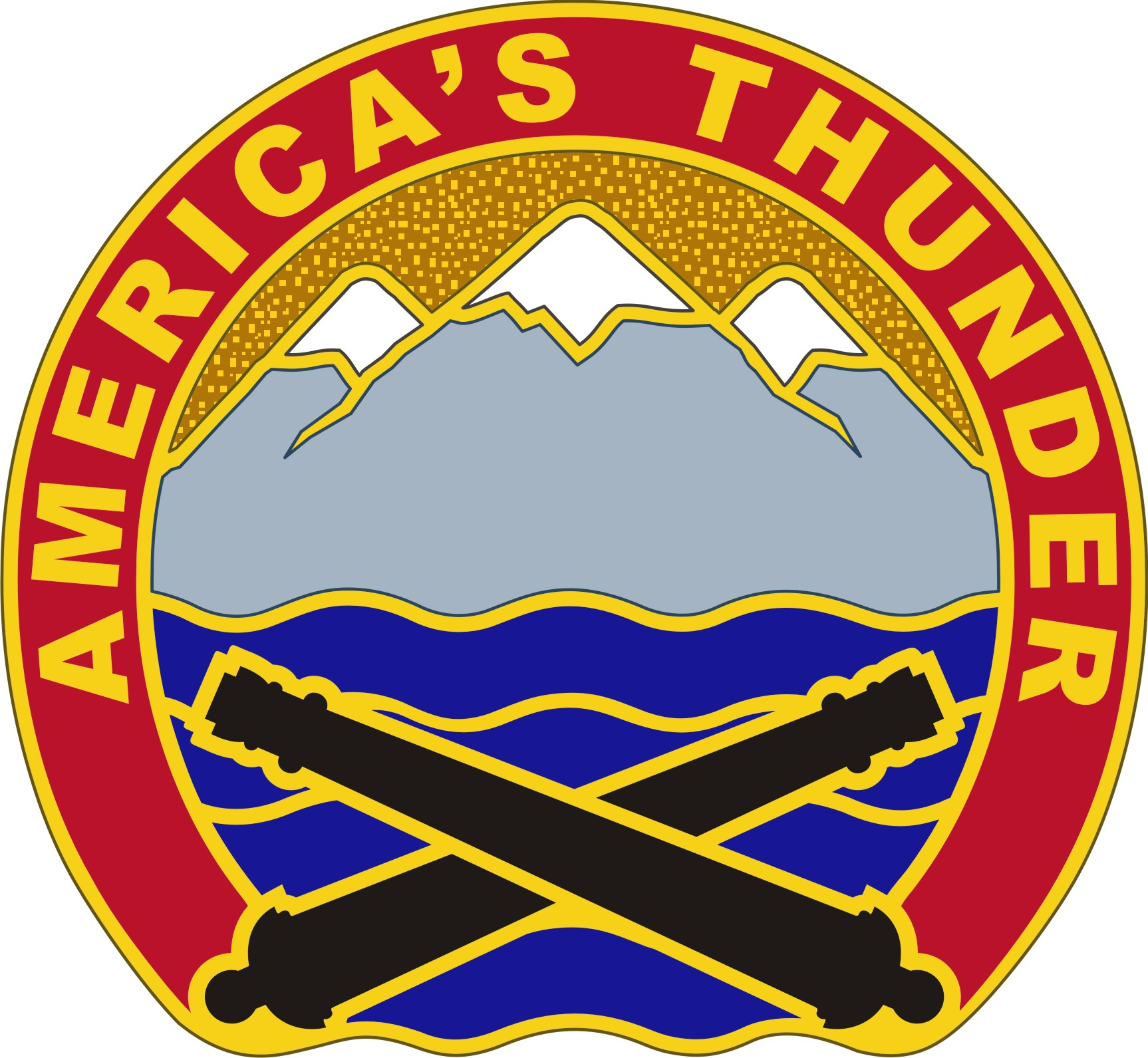
- Distinctive unit insignia

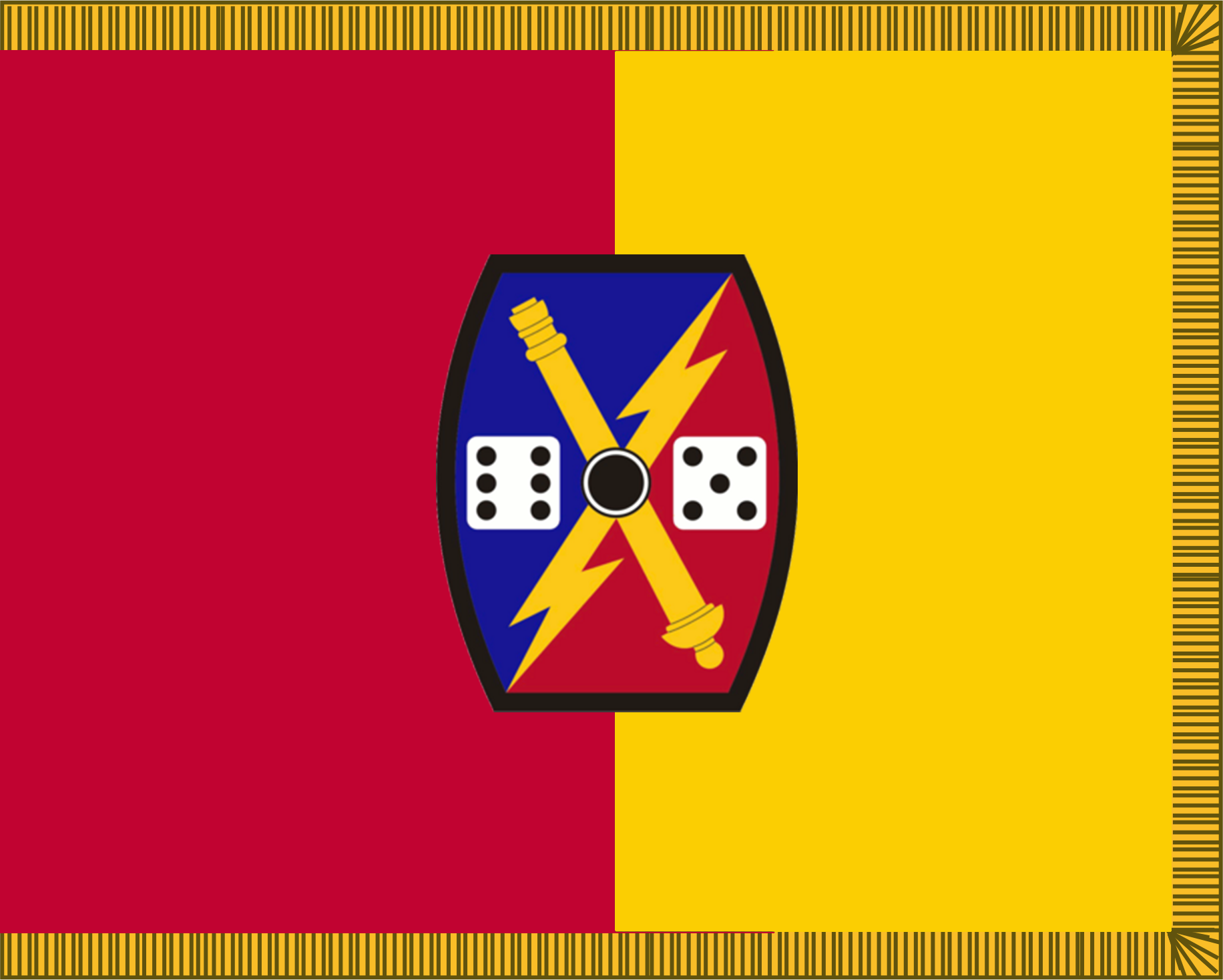
- 65th Field Artillery Brigade Flag

The 65th Field Artillery Brigade is an artillery brigade in the United States Army National Guard. It is part of the Utah Army National Guard. The brigade was formerly called the 65th Fires Brigade, and prior to that, I Corps Artillery.

== Current Structure ==
- 65th Field Artillery Brigade, at Camp Williams, Utah
  - Headquarters Battery, at Camp Williams, Utah
  - 1st Battalion, 145th Field Artillery Regiment (M109A6 Paladin), in Spanish Fork, Utah
  - 2nd Battalion, 222nd Field Artillery Regiment (M109A6 Paladin), in Cedar City, Utah
  - 340th Brigade Support Battalion, at Fort Ord (California Army National Guard)
  - 190th Signal Company, at Camp Williams, Utah
  - Battery F (Target Acquisition), 144th Field Artillery Regiment (California Army National Guard)

Three additional field artillery battalions of the brigade are under administrative control of other formations:

- 60th Troop Command, in Raleigh, North Carolina (North Carolina Army National Guard)
  - 5th Battalion, 113th Field Artillery Regiment (M142 HIMARS), in Louisburg, North Carolina
- 648th Maneuver Enhancement Brigade, in Columbus, Georgia (Georgia Army National Guard)
  - 1st Battalion, 214th Field Artillery Regiment (M109A6 Paladin), in Elberton, Georgia
- 678th Air Defense Artillery Brigade, in Eastover, South Carolina (South Carolina Army National Guard)
  - 1st Battalion, 178th Field Artillery Regiment (M109A6 Paladin), in Georgetown, South Carolina
