= Jeffrey Burkett =

U.S. Air Force general

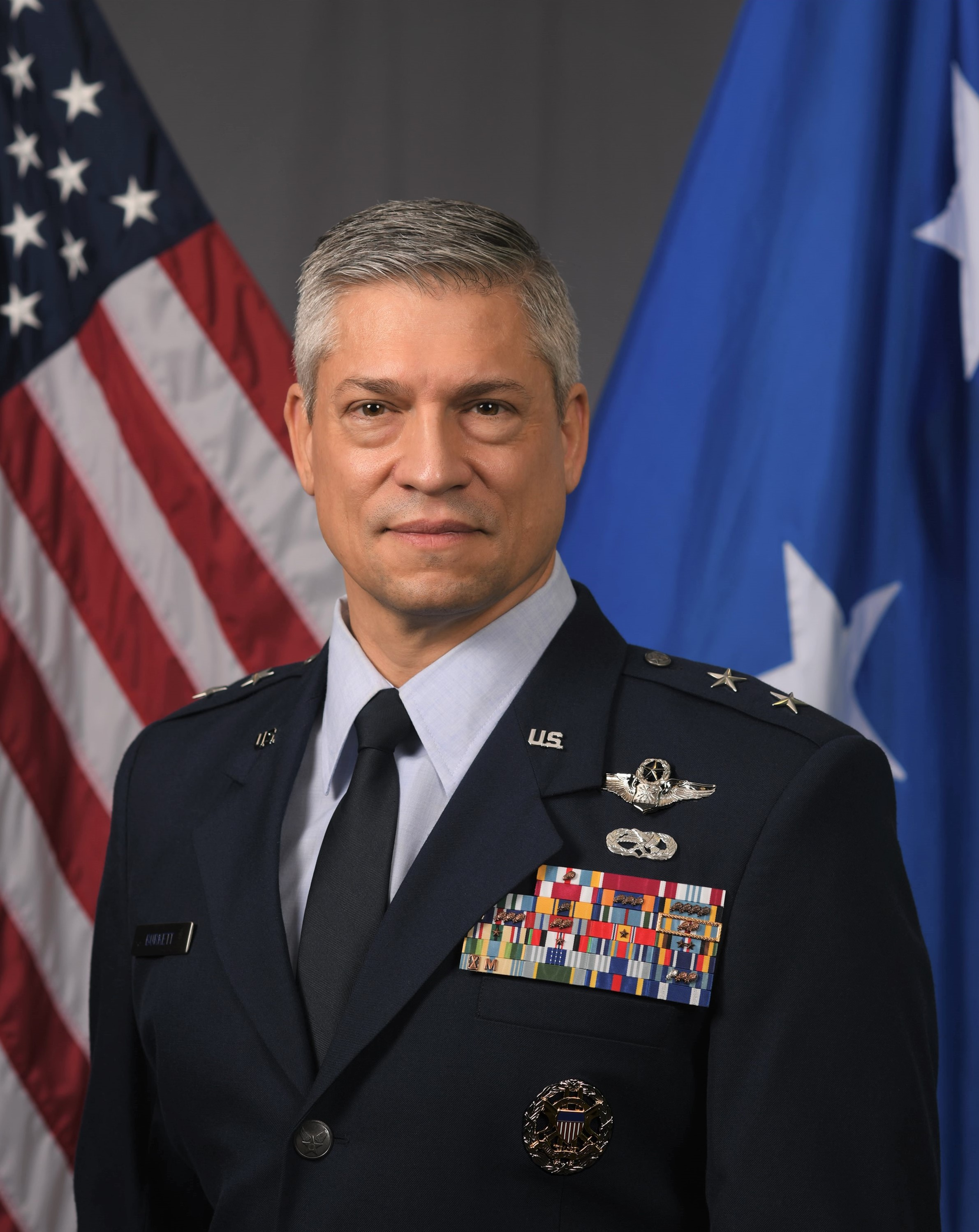
- Official portrait, 2020
- Military career
- Allegiance: United States
- Branch: United States Air Force
- Service years: 1990–2021
- Rank: Major General
- Commands: 152nd Airlift Wing; 179th Maintenance Group
- Conflicts: War in Afghanistan
- Awards: Defense Superior Service Medal (2); Legion of Merit

Jeffrey W. Burkett is a retired United States Air Force major general who served as the deputy director of the Joint Force Development and Design Center of the Joint Staff from November 2019 to December 2021. Previously, he was the vice director of domestic operations of the National Guard Bureau.
