= 192nd Airlift Squadron =

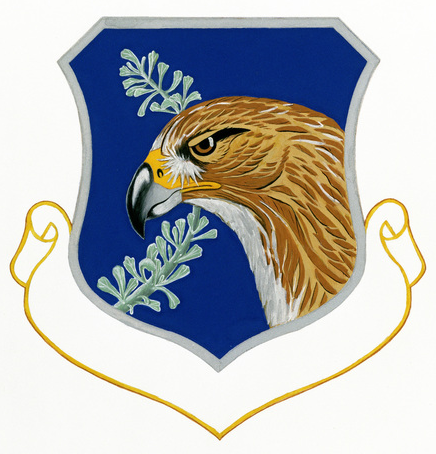
192nd Airlift Squadron

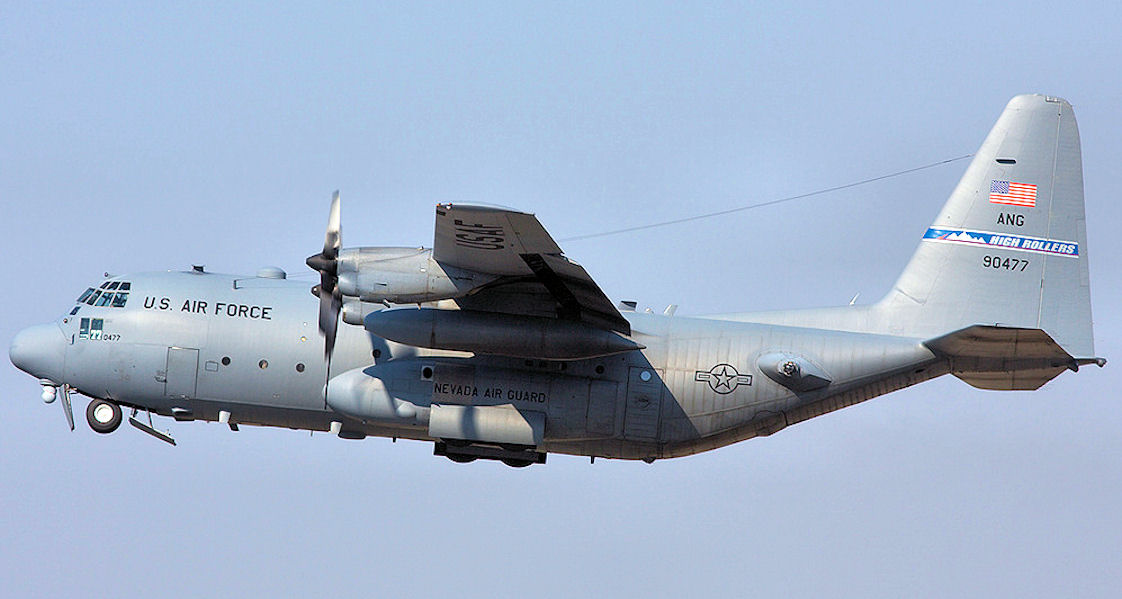
- 192nd Airlift Squadron C-130H Scathe View aircraft 79-0477
- Active: 1943–1945; 1946–1952; 1952–present
- Country: United States
- Allegiance: Nevada
- Branch: Air National Guard
- Type: Squadron
- Role: Airlift
- Part of: Nevada Air National Guard
- Garrison/HQ: May Air National Guard Base, Nevada
- Nickname: High Rollers
- Mascot: –
- Website: –––

Insignia
- 192nd Airlift Squadron emblem

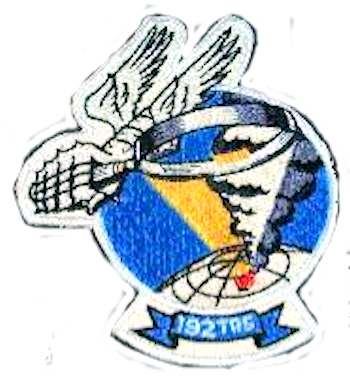
- 192nd Tactical Reconnaissance Squadron emblem
- Tail stripe: Blue tail stripe, High Rollers in white

The 192nd Airlift Squadron is a unit of the Nevada Air National Guard 152nd Airlift Wing located at Nevada Air National Guard Base, Nevada. The 192nd is equipped with the C-130H Hercules.

== History ==
=== World War II ===
Activated in October 1943 as the 408th Fighter Squadron at Hamilton Field, California. During World War II, the squadron was an Operational Training Unit (OTU), equipped with second-line P-39 Airacobras and P-40 Warhawks. Its mission was to train newly graduated pilots from Training Command in combat tactics and maneuvers before being assigned to their permanent combat unit. Initially assigned to IV Fighter Command, then transferred to III Fighter Command in 1944, being re-equipped with P-51D Mustangs. It took part in air-ground maneuvers and demonstrations, participating in the Louisiana Maneuvers in the summer of 1944 and in similar activities in the US until after V-J Day.

Inactivated in November 1945.

=== Nevada Air National Guard ===
The 408th Squadron was redesignated the 192nd Fighter Squadron and allotted to the National Guard on 24 May 1946. It was organized at Reno Army Air Base, Nevada and was extended federal recognition on 12 April 1948. The 192nd Fighter Squadron was equipped with F-51D Mustangs and was assigned to the California Air National Guard 61st Fighter Wing, although it was operationally under the control of the Nevada National Guard at Carson City, Nevada. During its early years with the F-51D, the unit earned prominence as one of the Air Force's most respected aerial gunnery competitors.

==== Korean War mobilization ====
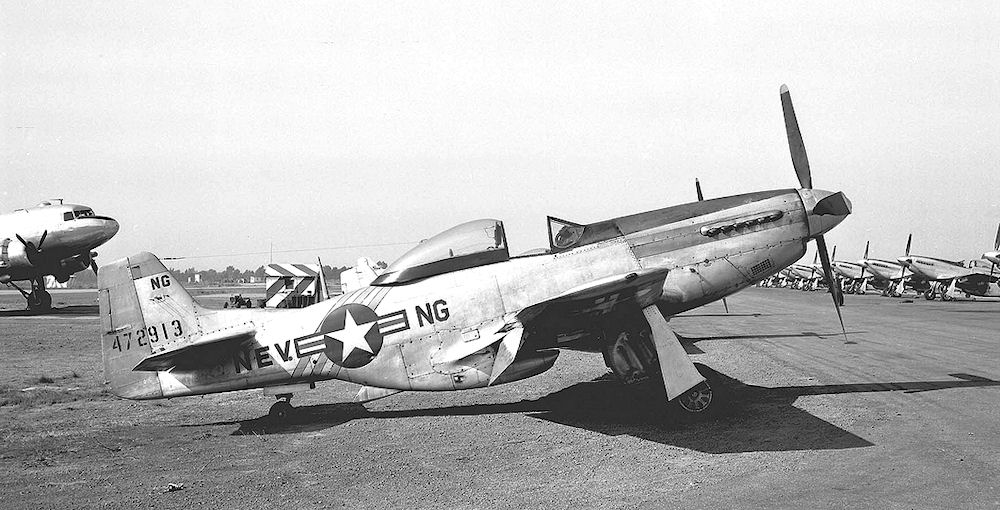
192nd Fighter Squadron – North American P-51D Mustang 44–72913, 1948

On 1 March 1951 the 192nd was federalized and brought to active-duty due to the Korean War. It was initially assigned to Strategic Air Command (SAC) and transferred to Bergstrom Air Force Base, Texas and assigned to the Federalized Missouri ANG 131st Fighter-Bomber Group. The 131st was composed of the 192nd, the 110th Fighter Squadron (Missouri); 170th Fighter Squadron (Illinois ANG) and 178th Fighter Squadron (North Dakota ANG). At Bergstrom, its mission was a filler replacement for the 27th Fighter-Escort Group which was deployed to Japan as part of SAC's commitment to the Korean War.

The unit was at Bergstrom until November when it was transferred to Tactical Air Command (TAC) and moved to George Air Force Base, California. At George, the unit was scheduled to be re-equipped with F-84D Thunderjets and was programmed for deployment to Japan, however the F-84s were instead sent to France and the 131st Fighter-Bomber Wing remained in California and flew its F-51 Mustangs for the remainder of its federal service. The 192nd Fighter-Bomber Squadron was released from active duty and returned to Nevada state control on 1 December 1952.

==== Air Defense ====
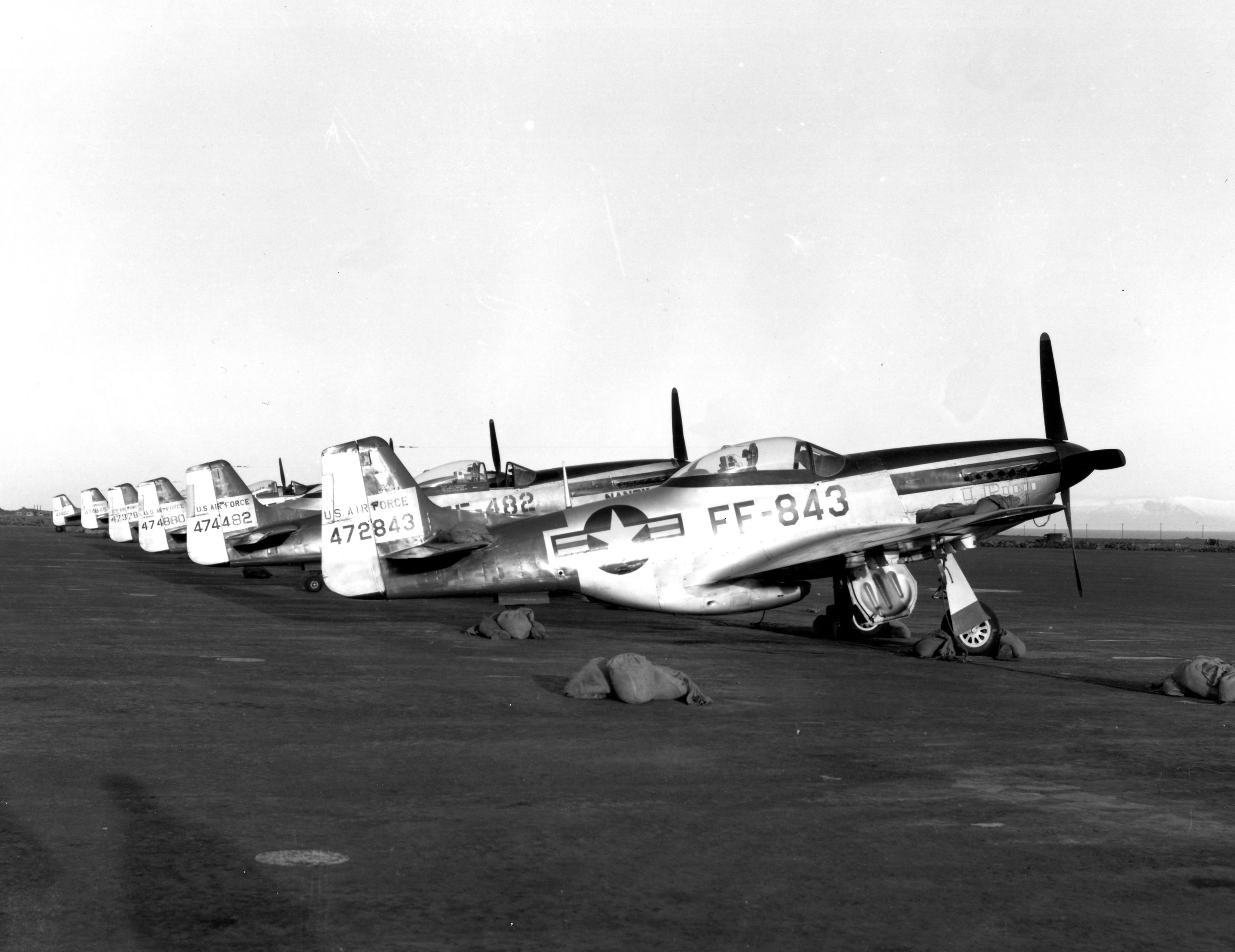
North American F-51D Mustangs of the 192nd Fighter-Bomber Squadron (Nevada Air National Guard) at Keflavik AFB, Iceland, in 1952–1953

Returning to Reno the unit was re-formed by 1 January 1953. The 192nd was transferred from Tactical Air Command (TAC) to Air Defense Command (ADC) with a mission of Air Defense over Nevada and Northern California. On 1 November 1954, the 192nd began the transition from the piston-engine, propeller driven F-51D to its first jet aircraft, the F-86A Sabre used as a daylight interceptor. On 1 June 1955, the 192nd was re-designated as the 194th Fighter-Interceptor Squadron.

On 19 April 1958, the 192nd was authorized to expand to a group level, and the 152nd Fighter Group was established. The 192nd Fighter-Interceptor Squadron becoming the group's flying squadron. Other elements assigned into the group were the 192nd headquarters, 192nd Material Squadron (maintenance and supply), 192nd Air Base Squadron, and the 192nd USAF Dispensary. Also in 1958, the day-only F-86As were sent to other units and the 192nd received the day/night/all-weather F-86L Sabre Interceptor aircraft.

==== Tactical Reconnaissance ====
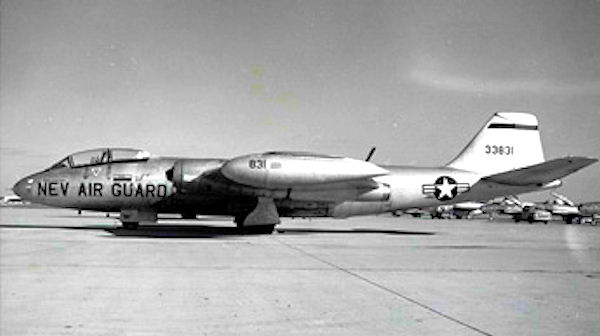
192nd TRS RB-57C 53–3831, about 1964

In 1961 Air Defense Command was reorganizing and the 192nd gaining command became Tactical Air Command (TAC). The squadron became the 192nd Tactical Reconnaissance Squadron, and equipped with RB-57B Canberra reconnaissance aircraft. Tactical reconnaissance would be the mission of the unit for the next 30 years. The RB-57s were the reconnaissance version of the B-57 Canberra light bomber. The RB-57s were used by the active-duty Air Force beginning in the mid-1950s and it began to be sent to Air National Guard units in the late 1950s when the McDonnell RF-101A Voodoo entered service.

The 192nd used the RB-57s primarily to carry out photographic surveys of areas hit by natural disasters such as hurricanes or tornadoes. It was placed on alert during the 1961 Berlin Crisis and 1962 Cuban Missile Crisis, however it was not activated or deployed overseas.

In 1965 the RF-4C Phantom II began to enter active USAF service, and the 192nd received supersonic McDonnell RF-101H Voodoos to replace the subsonic RB-57s. The unit served during the 1968 Pueblo Crisis. On 26 January 1968 the Nevada Air National Guard was called to active duty as part of a national effort to meet the threat posed by North Korean seizure of the U.S. Navy ship the "USS Pueblo." During the next 16 months, Nevada Air Guardsmen served in Korea, Japan, Vietnam, Thailand, the Philippines, North Africa and some 18 bases within the United States. During this tour, the 192nd Reconnaissance Squadron was awarded the 5th Air Force Outstanding Unit Award, only the second unit selected for this honor. All Nevada Air National Guard units were released from active duty on 9 June 1969.

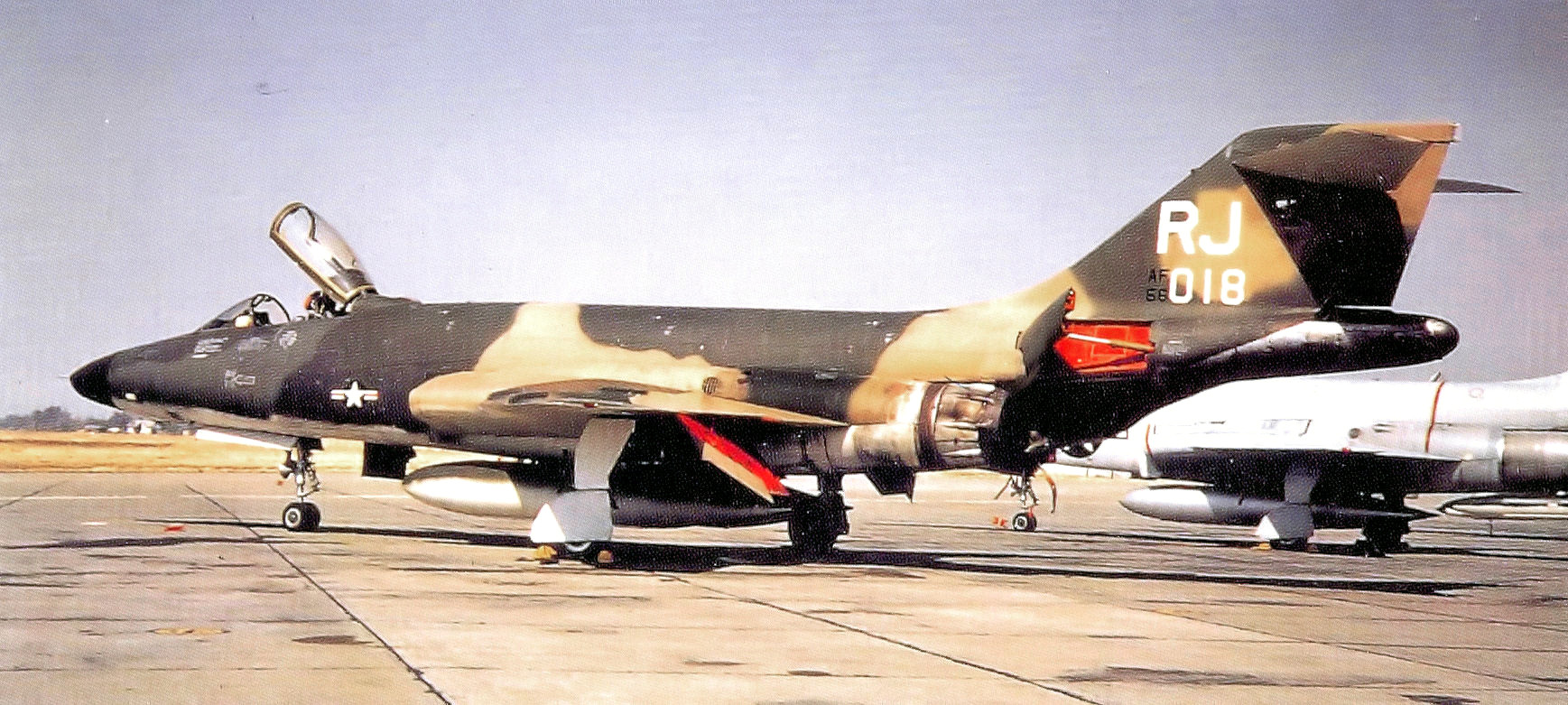
RF-101H at Richards-Gebur AFB, 1968 while federalized for Vietnam War

In 1971, the RF-101Hs were replaced by RF-101B Voodoos that were remanufactured after serving in the Royal Canadian Air Force. However, unlike the F-101Hs, the "B" model was extremely expensive to operate in the field, requiring several costly and time-consuming fixes in order to maintain an acceptable operating standard. The career of the RF-101B with the Nevada ANG was relatively brief, giving way to the RF-4C Phantom II in 1975. The 192nd operated the RF-4C Phantom for nearly 20 years. The RF-4C was still in service at the time of the 1990 Gulf Crisis, In response to the Iraqi invasion of Kuwait, the 106th TRS of the 117th Tactical Reconnaissance Wing of the Alabama ANG was deployed to Sheik Isa Air Base in Bahrain. This unit was reinforced in December 1990 by the 192nd TRS which deployed to Doha International Airport, Qatar.

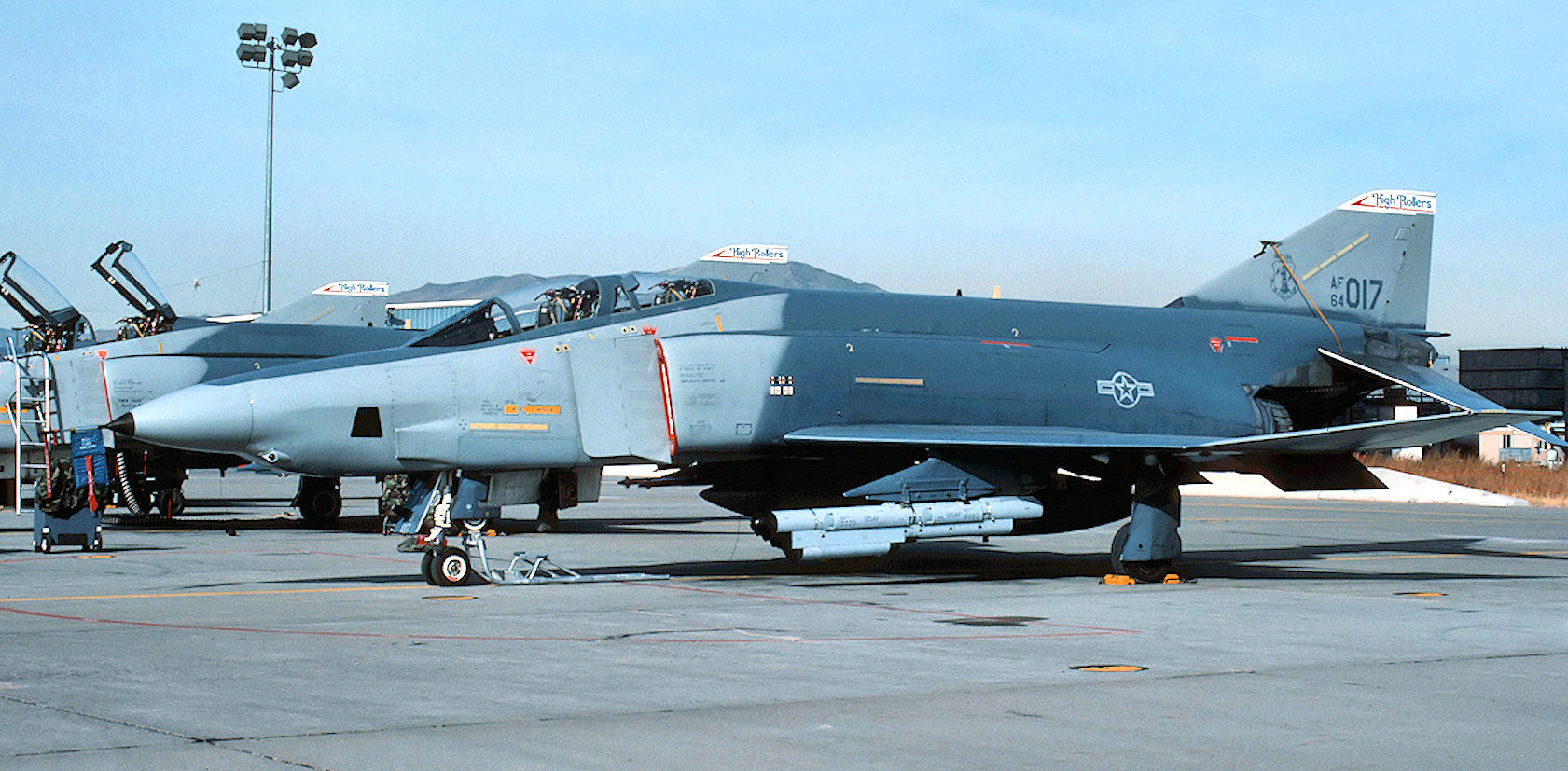
192nd TRS RF-4C 64-017

With combat operations beginning in January as part of Operation Desert Storm, the 192nd flew combat missions in the RF-4C. When the first strikes against Iraq took place on 17 January 1991, the RF-4Cs were in action from the start. At first, they were limited to daylight operations, flying over Kuwait almost every day in search of Iraqi Republican Guard units. They flew over Baghdad looking for such targets as rocket fuel plants, chemical weapons plants, and command and communications centers. Later, the RF-4Cs were repeated diverted from other photographic missions to go and look for Scud launchers hiding in western Iraq. No RF-4Cs were lost in action and eventually flew over 1,000 combat hours and 350 combat flying missions. The unarmed Nevada aircraft took over 19,000 photographic prints using 300,000 feet of film without a single target lost from processing.

Following the end of Desert Storm, the RF-4Cs began their retirement from USAF and Air National Guard service. The 192nd RS finally turned in its last four RF-4Cs on 27 September 1995, their planes being flown to Davis–Monthan Air Force Base for storage. These aircraft were the last RF-4Cs in operational service, and with their retirement the era of RF-4C service with United States armed forces to an end.

==== Current operations ====
The Nevada Air National Guard began the conversion to a new aircraft and mission in October 1995, with training and construction to support the Airlift mission and the Pacer Coin Reconnaissance mission. The unit received its first C-130E Hercules aircraft on 9 April 1996, and became an operational Airlift Wing in April 1997.

Pacer Coin was a day/night, all-weather reconnaissance and surveillance system which provided imagery intelligence support to theater and other commanders in support of drug interdiction operations for U.S. Southern Command. The unit assumed this mission when it converted to the C-130E Hercules in October 1995. The Nevada Air Guard had the only Pacer Coin aircraft in the inventory. The special sensors and optics on-board provided photo reconnaissance capability.

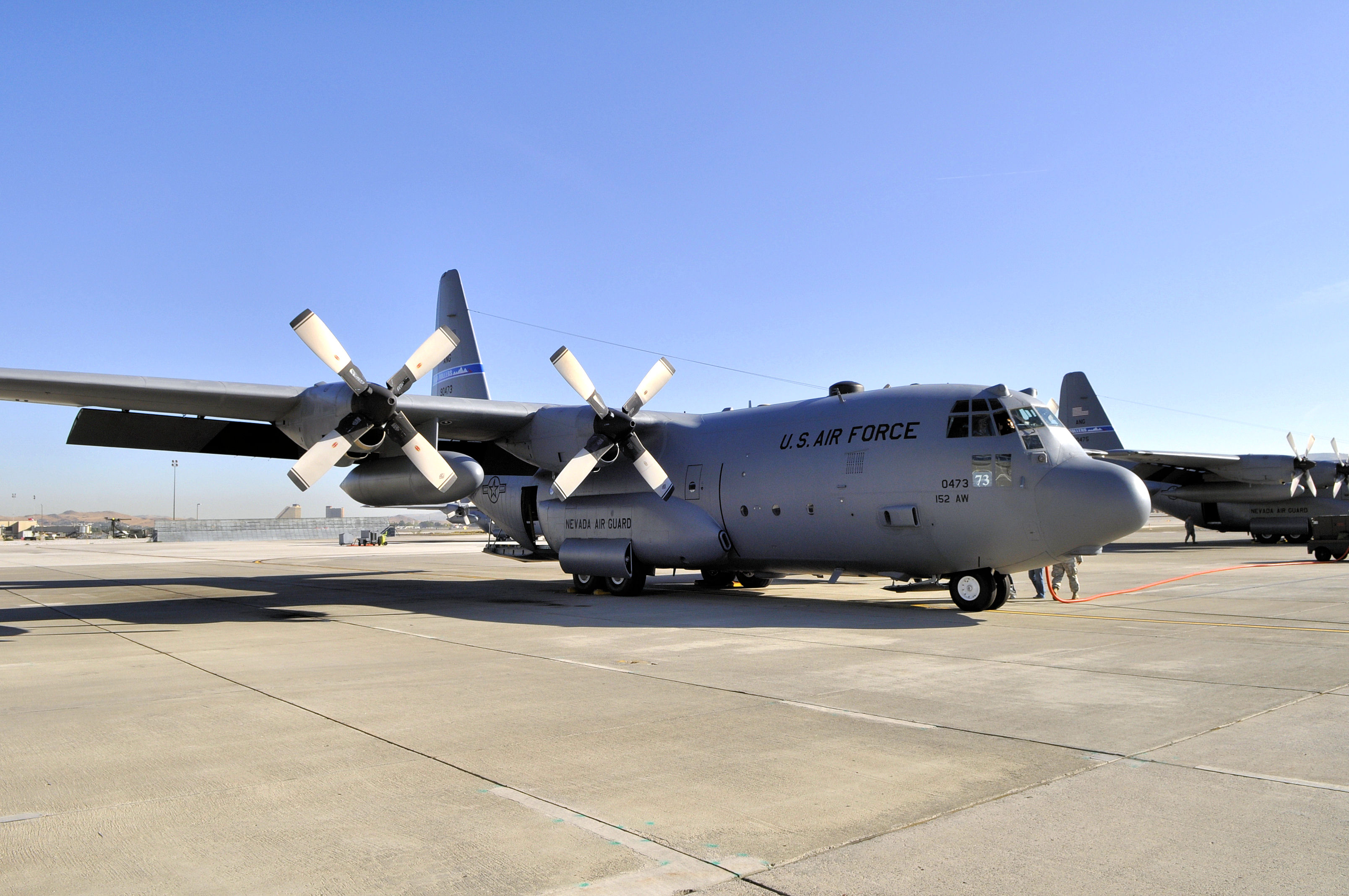
192nd Airlift Squadron – Lockheed C-130H Hercules

The 152nd AW also took part in Operation Joint Guard (August 1997 – December 1997) in support of peacekeeping operations in Bosnia. The unit deployed one aircraft and 130 personnel to provide reconnaissance support to the region with its Pacer Coin capability. Operating from Aviano Air Base, Italy, the unit was scheduled to remain in-theater for approximately 60 days, but was not returned home until after 104 days. Their deployments complete, the Pacer Coin aircraft was retired on 15 May 1998.

In May 1998, the United States military group (USMILGP) Commander Ecuador, requested the Nevada Air National Guard to send experienced individuals that could interface with the Ecuadorian Air Force, Army, and civilian mapping agency personnel. The purpose was to train them in the planning and execution of photo reconnaissance to assist them in their efforts to overcome the drug trafficking problems in their country. A week prior to the actual exercise to test the new methods and information, personnel from the 152nd AW deployed to Mariscal Sucre International Airport, Quito to conduct training and classes aimed at improving the skills of aircrew and photo interpreters. Classes were conducted for a week with classroom training as well as practical exercises.

The 152nd Airlift Wing began conversion from the C-130E to the C-130H in 1998. This conversion also included a modification, which provided additional Intelligence, Surveillance, and Reconnaissance asset to the Air National Guard called Scathe View. Scathe View is composed of a high-endurance, adverse weather-operable, specially modified C-130H aircraft; a roll-on/roll-off sensor control and communications pallet operated by 2 on-board airborne imagery analysts; and the Wescam (subsequently L-3) MX-15 "pentasensor," a day or night capable imagery sensor with a laser range finder and a laser illuminator. The Scathe View system disseminates intelligence data and information directly to ground forces in real time via on-board voice and data communications suites.

Scathe View had been an essential component of search and rescue, aerial mapping and Humanitarian Relief Operations (HUMRO) during post-Hurricane Katrina operations in 2005.

In September 2007, the Nevada Air National Guard utilized the Scathe View system in the search for millionaire adventurer and pilot Steve Fossett. The 152nd Intelligence Squadron, part of the Nevada Air National Guard's 152nd Airlift Wing, was the only unit at that time equipped with the Scathe View system.

As of 2007, the 152nd Intelligence Squadron had 8 C-130H aircraft fitted with the system. At that time it was also planned to upgrade the MX-15 sensor and to provide a Beyond Line of Sight capability, allowing passing of data to intermediate higher headquarters and worldwide users.

=== Lineage ===
- Constituted as the 408th Fighter Squadron on 12 October 1943

Activated on 15 October 1943
Redesignated 408th Fighter-Bomber Squadron on 5 April 1944
Redesignated 408th Fighter Squadron on 5 June 1944
Inactivated on 7 November 1945
Redesignated 192nd Fighter Squadron and allotted to the National Guard on 24 May 1946
Extended federal recognition on 12 April 1948
Federalized and placed on active duty on 1 March 1951
Redesignated 192nd Fighter-Bomber Squadron on 9 April 1951
Inactivated, released from active duty and returned to Nevada state control on 1 December 1952
Redesignated 192nd Fighter-Interceptor Squadron on 1 June 1955
Redesignated 192nd Tactical Reconnaissance Squadron on 1 April 1961
Federalized and placed on active duty on 26 January 1968
Released from active duty and returned to Nevada state control on 7 June 1969
Federalized and placed on active duty on 9 December 1990
Released from active duty and returned to Nevada state control in 1991
Redesignated 192nd Reconnaissance Squadron on 15 March 1992
Redesignated 192nd Airlift Squadron on 1 April 1997

=== Assignments ===
- 372nd Fighter Group (later 372nd Fighter-Bomber Group, 372nd Fighter Group), 15 Oct 1943 – 7 Nov 1945
- 61st Fighter Wing, 12 April 1948
- 144th Fighter Group, 25 June 1948
- Fourteenth Air Force, 1 March 1951
- 131st Fighter-Bomber Group, March 1951
- Iceland Base Command, 15 September 1952 – 1 November 1952
- 144th Fighter-Bomber Group (later 144th Fighter-Interceptor Group), 1 November 1952
- 152nd Fighter Group (Air Defense) (later 152nd Tactical Reconnaissance Group), 19 April 1958
- 123rd Tactical Reconnaissance Wing, 26 January 1968
- 152nd Tactical Reconnaissance Group (later 152nd Reconnaissance Group), 7 June 1969
- 152nd Operations Group, 1 January 1996 – present

=== Stations ===
- Hamilton Field, California, 15 October 1943
- Portland Army Air Base, Oregon, 7 December 1943
- Esler Field, Louisiana, 25 March 1944
- Pollock Army Air Field, Louisiana, 15 April 1944
- Esler Field, Louisiana, 9 February 1945
- Alexandria Army Air Base, Louisiana, 14 Sep – 7 November 1945
- Reno Army Air Base, Nevada, 12 April 1948
- Bergstrom Air Force Base, Texas, 9 April 1951
- George Air Force Base, California, 7 August 1951
- Keflavik International Airport, 15 September – 1 November 1952
- Stead Air Force Base, Nevada 1 November 1952
- Hubbard Field (later May Air National Guard Base), Nevada, 1 February 1954
- Richards-Gebaur Air Force Base, Missouri, 26 January 1968
- May Air National Guard Base, 7 June 1969
- Shaik Isa Air Base, Bahrein, December 1990 – April 1991
- May Air National Guard Base, 1991 – present

=== Aircraft ===
- P-39 Airacobra, 1943–1944
- P-40 Warhawk, 1944–1945
- P-51D (later F-51) Mustang, 1945, 1948–1955
- F-86A Sabre, 1955–1958
- F-86L Sabre, 1958–1961
- RB-57B Canberra, 1961–1965
- RB-57A Canberra, 1965
- RF-101H Voodoo, 1965–1971
- RF-101B Voodoo, 1971–1975
- RF-4C Phantom II, 1975–1995
- C-130E Hercules, 1996–1998
- C-130H Hercules, 1998–Present
