= Regional Transportation Commission =

Regional Transportation Commission may refer to:

- Regional Transportation Commission of Southern Nevada, United States
- Regional Transportation Commission of Washoe County, northern Nevada, United States
