= Reno–Tahoe International Airport =

Airport in Reno, Nevada, United States

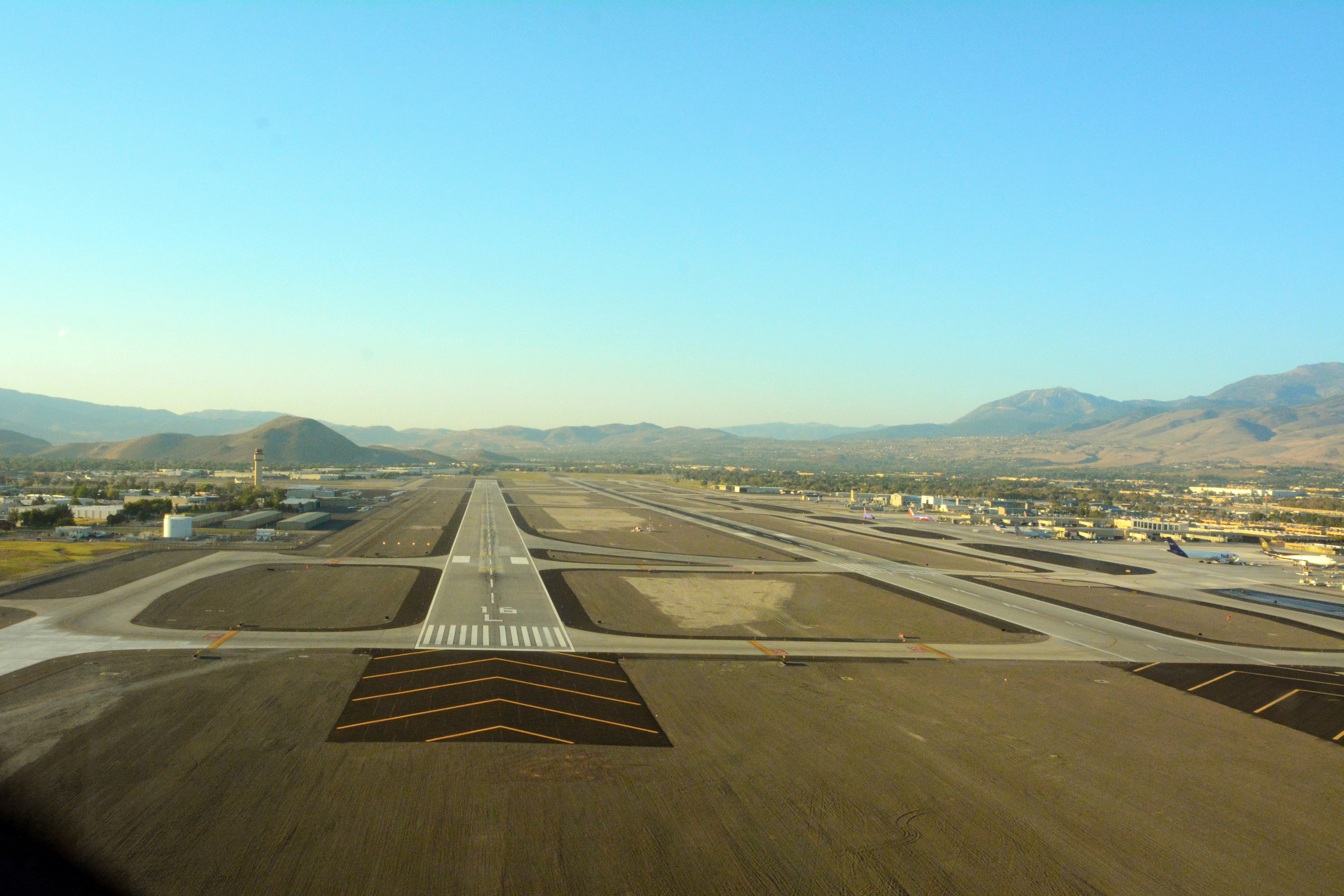
- IATA: RNO; ICAO: KRNO; FAA LID: RNO

Summary
- Airport type: Public/military
- Owner/Operator: Reno–Tahoe Airport Authority
- Serves: Reno, Nevada
- Location: Reno, Nevada
- Elevation AMSL: 4,415 ft (1,346 m)
- Coordinates: 39°29′57″N 119°46′05″W
- Website: www.renoairport.com

Maps
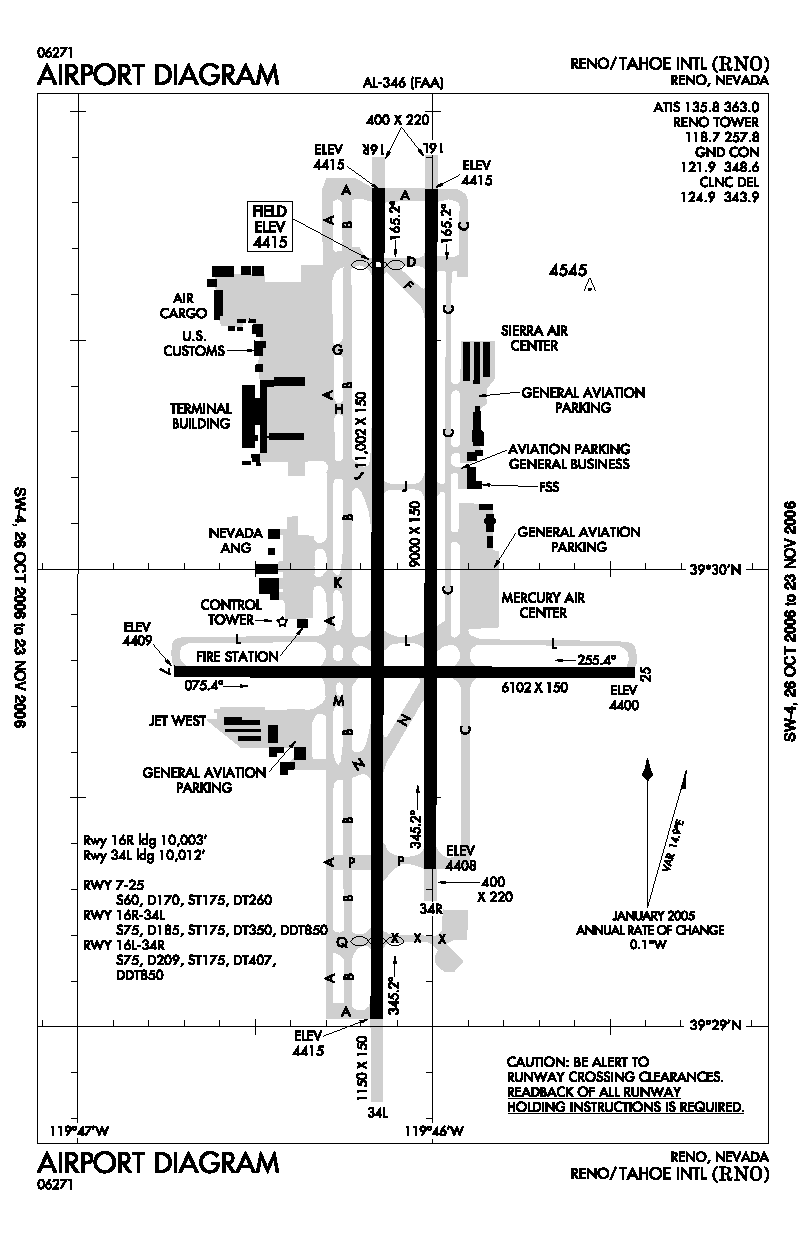
- FAA diagram
- Interactive map of Reno–Tahoe International Airport

Runways
Direction	Length		Surface
Direction	ft	m	Surface
17R/35L	11,001	3,353	Concrete
17L/35R	9,000	2,743	Concrete
07/25	6,102	1,860	Concrete

Statistics (2025)
- Passengers: 4,912,900
- Total cargo (lbs.): 83,602,552
- Sources: FAA

Reno–Tahoe International Airport (IATA: RNO, ICAO: KRNO, FAA LID: RNO) is a public and military airport three miles (4.8 km) southeast of downtown Reno, in Washoe County, Nevada, United States. It is the state's second busiest commercial airport after Harry Reid International Airport in Las Vegas. The Nevada Air National Guard has the 152nd Airlift Wing southwest of the airport's main terminal. The airport is named after both the City of Reno, Nevada and Lake Tahoe. The airspace of Reno-Tahoe Airport is controlled by the Northern California TRACON and Oakland Air Route Traffic Control Center.

== History ==
=== Early years ===
The airport was built in 1929 by Boeing Transport Inc. and named Hubbard Field after Boeing Air Transport VP and air transport pioneer Eddie Hubbard. It was acquired by United Airlines in 1936 and purchased by the City of Reno in 1953. The August 1953 OAG shows 15 scheduled departures each weekday; ten years later there were 28.

Jets (United 727s) arrived in June 1964; runway 16 (now 17R) was extended southward from 7800 to 9000 feet around that time. The airport didn't have a nonstop to Los Angeles until 1969; a nonstop to Chicago began in 1970.

The first terminal building was completed in time for the 1960 Winter Olympics held in Squaw Valley, California in 1960. The present ticketing lobby and concourses were built in 1979. The airport received its current name in 1994 (which honors both the city and the nearby popular tourist destination Lake Tahoe), when the terminal was named in honor of retired Air Force Reserve Major General and former U.S. Senator Howard Cannon. Prior to that the airport itself was named Cannon International Airport.

Reno–Tahoe International was the hub of Reno Air, a now-defunct airline that flew MD-80s and MD-90s to many cities until it was bought by American Airlines and later disposed of, in 2001. Reno Air's first flight was on July 1, 1992, and its last flight was August 30, 1999. On New Year's Eve of 2003, Continental Airlines completed the installation of self check-in in the continental United States at Reno International.

=== Expansion ===
In 1996, the baggage claim and ticketing area were updated with technology and decor. In 2008, the airport began a $70 million project that enhanced the baggage screening equipment and remodeled the ticketing area with a modern Tahoe theme; the project was entirely completed in 2010. In March 2013, a $24 million expansion of the airport was completed and focused on a new centralized TSA Security Checkpoint on the ground level, and above it, a shopping and dining promenade called "High Mountain Marketplace". Windows in the dining areas allow views of the mountains and runways. Future projects may include updates to the concourses.

=== International service ===
Current Reno–Tahoe Airport Authority CEO Cris Jensen stated, "we've had [service to Canada] in the past."

In February 2014, the airport announced that Volaris planned to start operating non-stop service flights to Guadalajara, Mexico sometime in 2015. Since the DOT approved the route, it is Reno's first international non-stop service since 1999. On October 7, 2014, the DOT and the airport announced that Volaris would start a twice weekly flight to Guadalajara, Mexico from Reno on December 16, 2014.

In November 2014, Thomas Cook Airlines announced that it planned to introduce twice weekly, non-stop flights from London–Gatwick to Reno starting in December 2015. It would have been the first transatlantic route from Reno Airport. However, Thomas Cook Airlines canceled these plans in May 2015 stating insufficient border control capacities at the airport to handle their Airbus A330. Finally, in September 2019, Thomas Cook went into compulsory liquidation.

Jensen reported that there was discussion to create routes from Reno to "beach destinations" and Canada.

=== Future expansion and MoreRNO project ===
In April 2022, the Reno−Tahoe Airport Authority announced the MoreRNO project, with plans to modernize the airport. The estimated cost of the project is $1 billion, and it is expected to be completed in 2029. The project includes the ticketing hall expansion, which was completed in April 2024 with a cost of $35 million. The new ticketing hall includes self-check-in kiosks and new processes to increase efficiency. Additionally, there will be improved ground transportation and a concourse development.

In early August 2025, construction began on the Central Utility Plant and the Police and Airport Authority Headquarters.

== Facilities ==
=== Overview ===
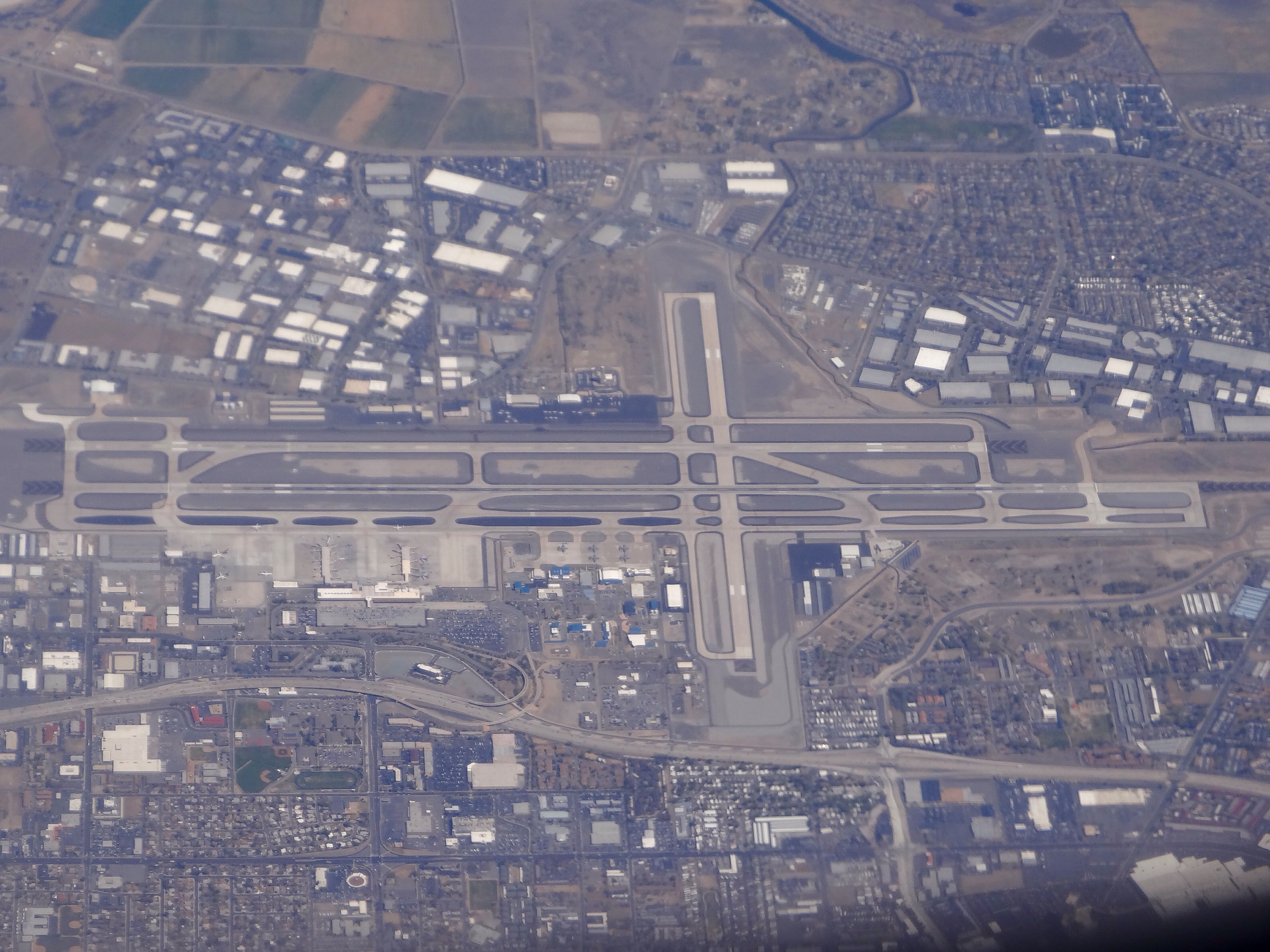
Reno Airport

Reno–Tahoe International Airport covers 1,450 acres (590 hectares; 2.27 square miles; 5.9 square kilometers) at an elevation of 4,415 feet (1.346 km). In the year ending June 30, 2019, the airport had 104,239 aircraft operations, with an average of 285 per day: 46% airline, 41% general aviation, 11% air taxi, and 2% military. At that time, 161 aircraft were based here: 104 single-engine, 19 multi-engine, 23 jet, 9 military, and 6 helicopter. The National Plan of Integrated Airport Systems categorized it as a primary commercial service airport (more than 10,000 enplanements per year).

It has three concrete runways: 17R/35L is 11,001 by 150 feet (3,353 by 46 m); 17L/35R is 9,000 by 150 feet (2,743 by 46 m); 8/26 is 6,102 by 150 feet (1,860 by 46 m). During September through November 2010, the airport opened a new 200-foot (61 m) ATCT to replace the 70-foot (21 m) control tower that had been used for more than 50 years. It was designed by the Parsons Design Firm, which is responsible for the design of many other ATCT towers. The cost of the new tower was about 30 million dollars.

The passenger terminal is named after the late US Senator Howard Cannon. The lobby of the terminal has an exhibit with the bust of Nevada State Senator (and Nevada State Senate Minority Leader) William J. "Bill" Raggio. Raggio is described in the exhibit as being "The Father of the Airport Authority."

=== Military facilities ===

The airport is also host to Reno Air National Guard Base, an approximately 60-acre (24 ha) complex, which was established on the west side of the airport in 1954, when Air National Guard units relocated from the former Stead Air Force Base in Reno.

The base is home to the 152d Airlift Wing (152 AW), a Nevada Air National Guard unit operationally gained by the Air Mobility Command (AMC) and equipped with C-130H Hercules aircraft.

== Terminals ==
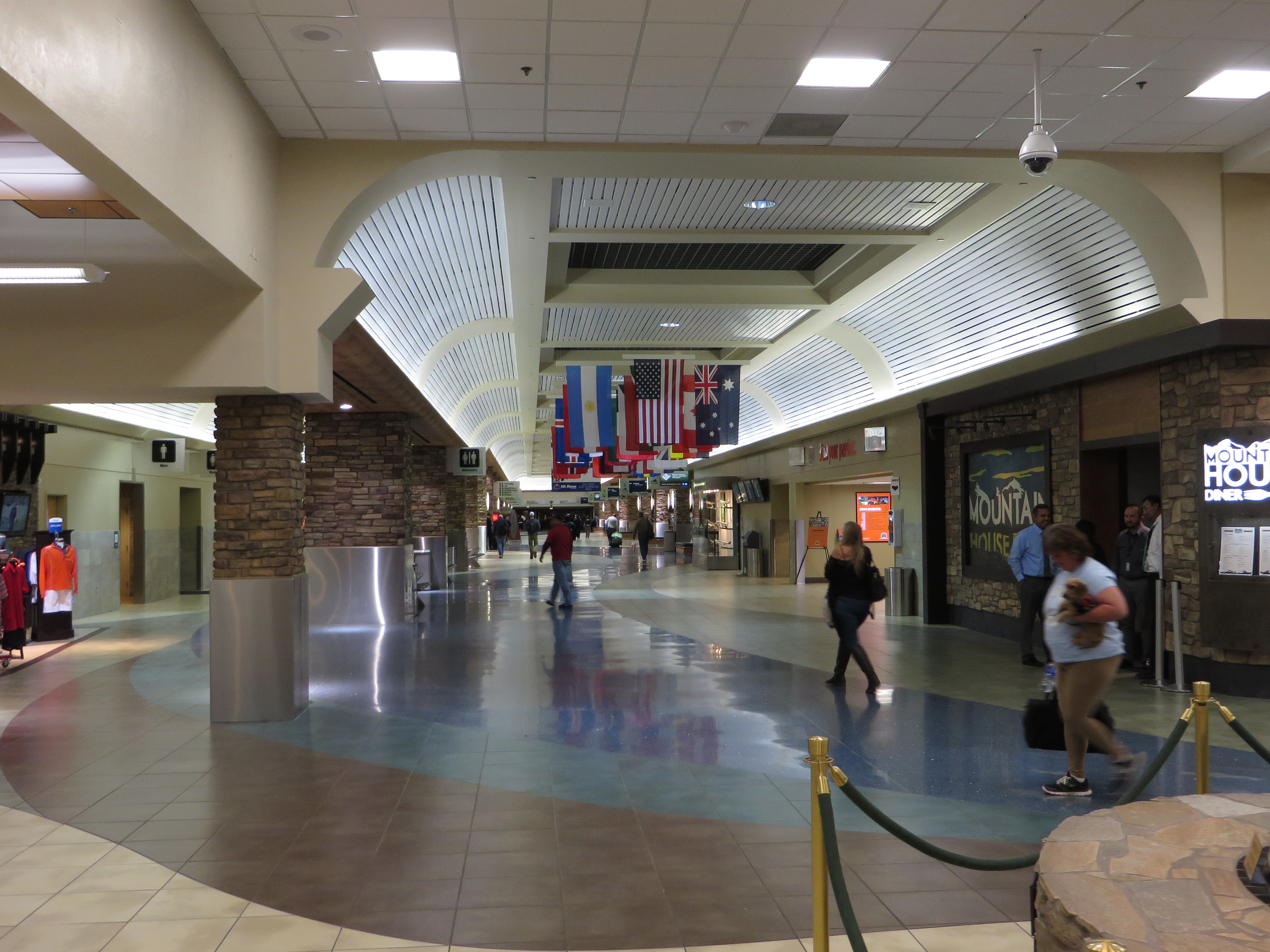
Terminal interior as seen in 2014

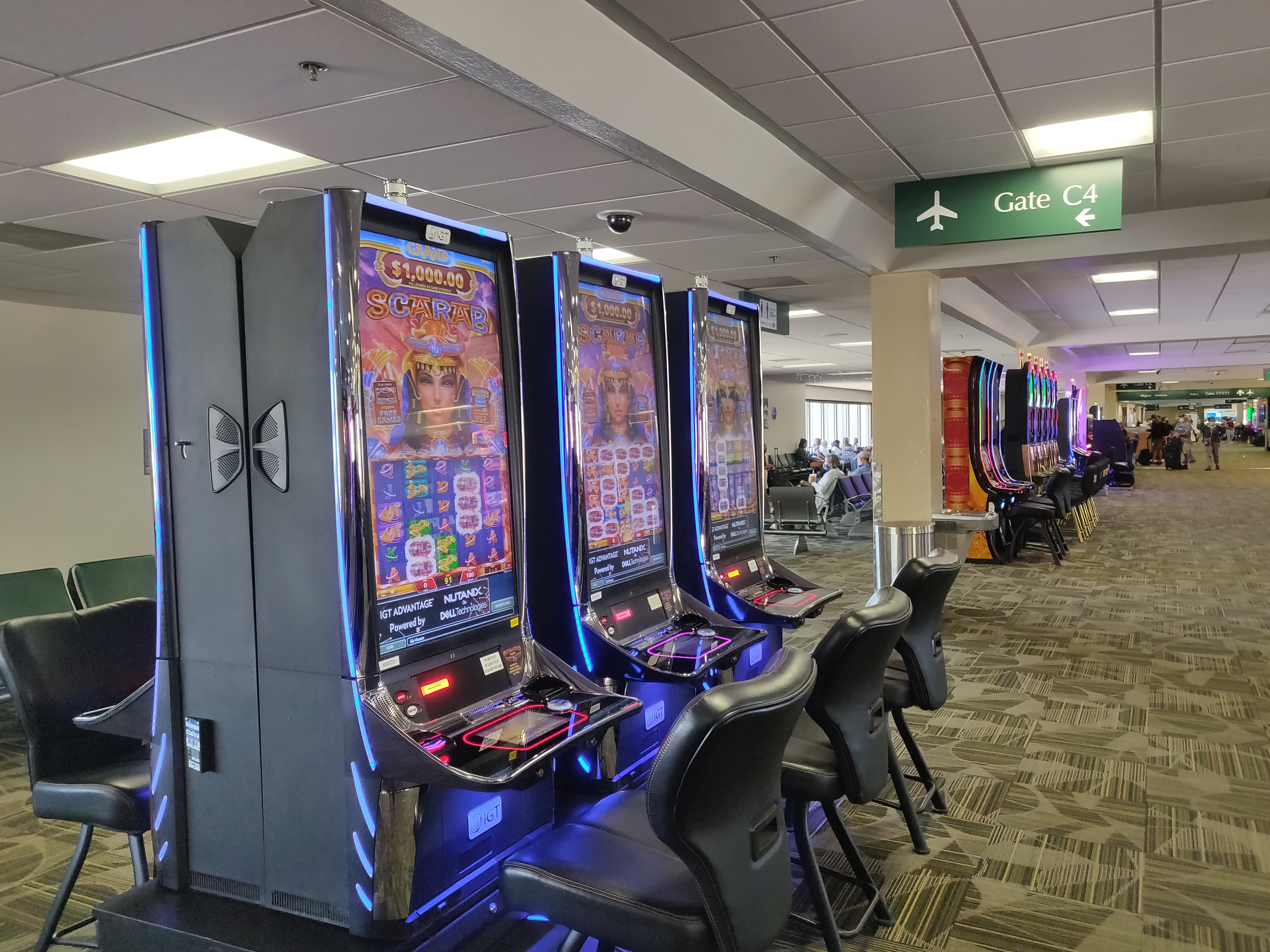
The airport features slot machines at the gates

Reno–Tahoe International Airport provides two concourses, designated B and C, with 23 total jet bridge gates. The current terminals were built in 1981.

The MoreRNO project includes the construction of two new concourses that will replace the current ones, which will be demolished upon the former's completion. The extra runway space will be used for double taxi lanes. There are to be 24 total jet bridge gates when completed that will be capable of accommodating all aircraft. They will encompass twice the area of the current terminals, and concession areas will be larger. The new terminals are estimated to cost $650 million. The concourses are designed by McCarthy Building Companies and Gensler.

== Airlines and destinations ==
=== Passenger ===
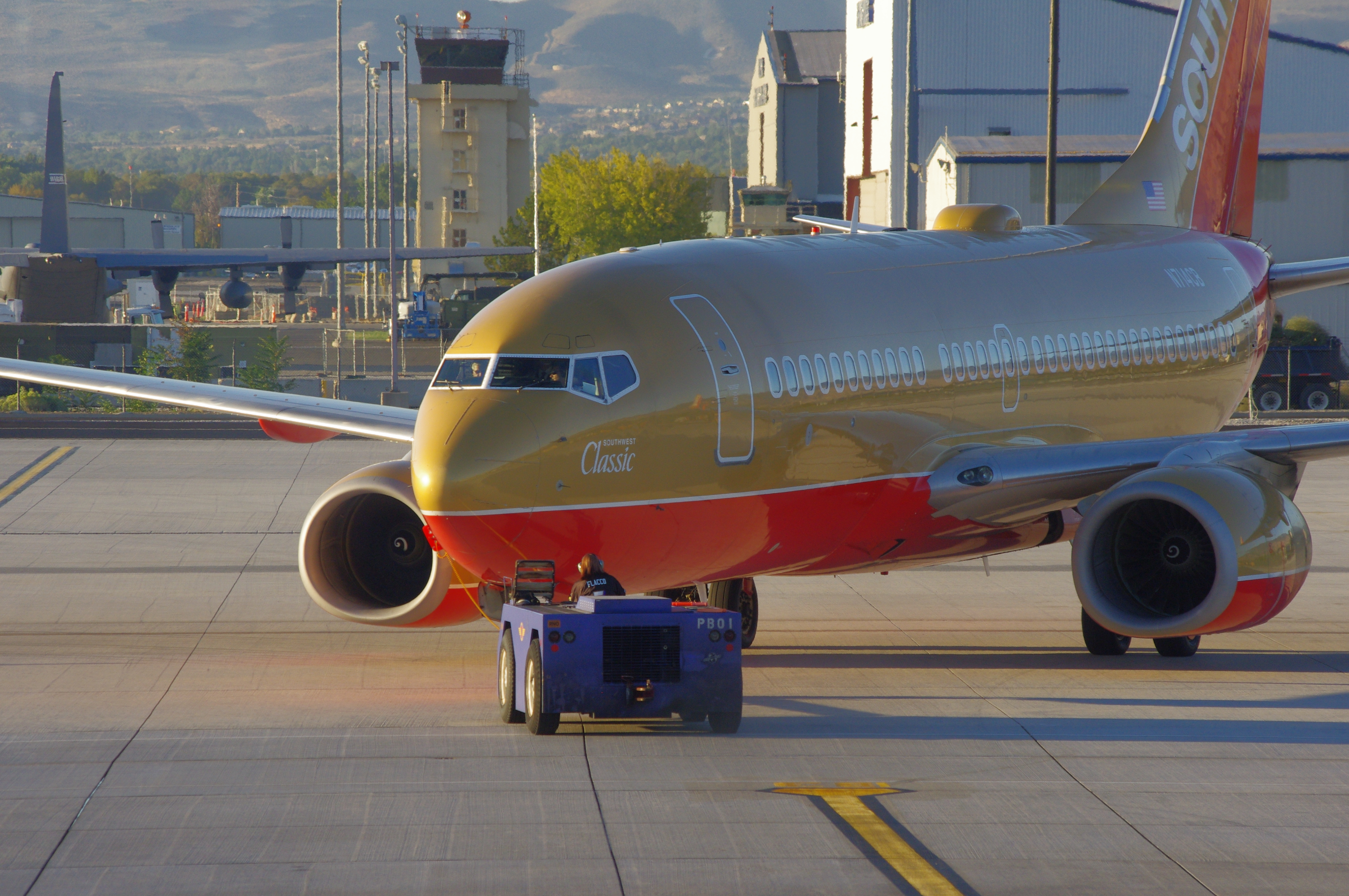
A Southwest Airlines Boeing 737-700 being pushed back

Airlines	Destinations
Alaska Airlines	Portland (OR), Seattle/Tacoma, San Diego
American Airlines	Dallas/Fort Worth, Phoenix–Sky Harbor
American Eagle	Phoenix–Sky Harbor
Delta Air Lines	Atlanta, Salt Lake City; Seasonal: Minneapolis/St. Paul
Delta Connection	Los Angeles, Salt Lake City
Frontier Airlines	Denver, Las Vegas, Phoenix–Sky Harbor
JetBlue	Seasonal: New York–JFK
JSX	Burbank, Orange County; Seasonal: Las Vegas, San Diego/Carlsbad
Southwest Airlines	Burbank, Denver, Las Vegas, Long Beach, Los Angeles, Nashville, Phoenix–Sky Harbor, San Diego, San Jose (CA); Seasonal: Austin, Chicago–Midway, Dallas–Love
Sun Country Airlines	Seasonal: Minneapolis/St. Paul
United Airlines	Chicago–O'Hare, Denver, San Francisco; Seasonal: Houston–Intercontinental, Los Angeles
United Express	Los Angeles, San Francisco
Volaris	Guadalajara

Destination maps
Domestic destinations (except California) from Reno–Tahoe International Airport
Red = Year-round destination
Green = Seasonal destination
Blue = Future destination
California destinations from Reno–Tahoe International Airport
Red = Year-round destination
Green = Seasonal destination
Blue = Future destination
International destinations from Reno–Tahoe International Airport

=== Cargo ===
Airlines	Destinations
DHL Aviation	Los Angeles, Phoenix–Sky Harbor

== Statistics ==
=== Top destinations ===
Busiest domestic routes from RNO (August 2025 – July 2026)
Rank	City	Passengers	Carriers
1	Las Vegas, Nevada	471,100	Frontier, Southwest
2	Denver, Colorado	330,400	Frontier, Southwest, United
3	Phoenix–Sky Harbor, Arizona	275,400	American, Southwest
4	Los Angeles, California	189,040	Alaska, Delta, JetBlue, Southwest, United
5	Dallas/Fort Worth, Texas	180,780	American
6	San Francisco, California	150,090	United
7	San Diego, California	132,380	Alaska, Southwest
8	Seattle/Tacoma, Washington	127,880	Alaska
9	Salt Lake City, Utah	122,990	Delta
10	Long Beach, California	76,930	Southwest

=== Airline market share ===
Largest airlines at RNO (March 2025 - February 2026)
Rank	Airline	Passengers	Share
1	Southwest Airlines	1,926,000	40.54%
2	United Airlines	660,000	14.03%
3	American Airlines	658,000	13.53%
4	SkyWest Airlines	469,000	9.86%
5	Delta Air Lines	304,000	6.41%
–	Other Airlines	743,000	15.64%

=== Annual traffic ===
Annual passenger traffic (enplaned + deplaned) at RNO
Year	Passengers	Change	Year	Passengers	Change
2006	5,000,663	–	2016	3,650,830	▲6.3%
2007	5,044,087	▲0.87%	2017	4,015,305	▲10.0%
2008	4,434,638	▼12.08%	2018	4,210,095	▲4.8%
2009	3,755,935	▼15.30%	2019	4,450,673	▲5.7%
2010	3,822,485	▲1.8%	2020	2,006,420	▼54.9%
2011	3,754,155	▼1.8%	2021	3,623,458	▲80.6%
2012	3,479,122	▼7.3%	2022	4,310,958	▲19.0%
2013	3,431,986	▼1.4%	2023	4,573,384	▲6.1%
2014	3,298,915	▼3.9%	2024	4,849,976	▲6.0%
2015	3,432,657	▲3.9%	2025	4,912,900	▲1.3%

== Ground transportation ==
=== Car rental ===
The airport provides access to nine different rental car agencies, with rental car pickup available right outside the terminal building. All nine rental car counters are located in the baggage claim. After completing the rental agreement inside, vehicles may be collected from the parking structure located just outside the baggage claim.

=== Taxis and limousines ===
The passenger waiting area for taxis and limousines is located outside of the D Doors located north of the baggage claim.

=== Bus ===
Public transportation to/from the airport is available via RTC Ride bus:

- Route 12 takes passengers either to Downtown 4th Street Station or Meadowood Mall and stops at Terminal Way & Villanova Drive, a short walk from the airport north of baggage claim via the marked pedestrian walkway.

The Eastern Sierra Transit provides bus service from Reno Airport to destinations in the Eastern Sierras region of California, between Lone Pine, California and Reno.

=== Shuttles ===
Complimentary hotel shuttles stop along the curb, outside the D Doors located north of the baggage claim, to pick up passengers.

== Accidents and incidents ==
- At 10:15 pm on November 24, 1971, a Northwest Orient Airlines Boeing 727 landed at the airport with the aft airstair still deployed after the aircraft had been hijacked by an unidentified man who is only known as D.B. Cooper. The aircraft had been hijacked by Cooper between Portland, Oregon and Seattle, Washington earlier that day. After landing in Seattle, the passengers were released. Cooper and the crew of the 727 were allowed to depart from Seattle to Mexico City with a fuel stop in Reno. The crew reported that the aft airstair had been deployed while over southern Washington. Upon landing in Reno, the aircraft was surrounded by law enforcement. An armed search quickly confirmed that Cooper was gone. The identity of the hijacker and his whereabouts remain a mystery to this day.
- In the early morning hours of January 21, 1985, Galaxy Airlines Flight 203, a Lockheed L-188 Electra, took off from the airport for Minneapolis, Minnesota and crashed 1.5 miles (2.4 km) southwest of the airport while the pilots were attempting an emergency landing after experiencing an unexpected vibration from under the wing. An investigation attributed the crash to pilot error for failing to maintain proper control over the aircraft while investigating the cause of the vibration. The vibration was later found to be caused by an open air start service door which the ground crew failed to secure before departure. All but one of the 71 passengers and crew on board were killed.
- Also in 1985, Roger Stockham, who would later be arrested for attempting to blow up a mosque in Michigan, was arrested at the airport for planting a pipe bomb and carrying an unregistered weapon.
- On March 22, 1995, a Cessna 208 Caravan operated by Union Flights impacted a mountain 9 nautical miles from RNO, killing the sole occupant, the pilot. The pilot failed to comply with published instrument approach procedures and prematurely descended below the minimum altitude specified for the approach.
- On April 13, 2011, a Piper Cheyenne air ambulance flight landed uneventfully at Reno–Tahoe International Airport without a clearance, after the single overnight air traffic controller fell asleep. Federal Aviation Regulations state that if a control tower is not in operation (a condition satisfied by the fact that the controller was asleep), it is considered an "uncontrolled airport" with flight and ground movement becoming the responsibility of the pilot. The incident was minor in nature and safety was never compromised; however, it led to the resignation of Air Traffic Organization chief executive Hank Krakowski. The Federal Aviation Administration announced that 27 airports, including RNO, would subsequently be staffed with two air traffic controllers during graveyard shifts.

== Sound levels ==
Sound levels have been analyzed for over two decades at this airport, with one of the first studies being a comprehensive production of aircraft sound level contour maps. Later analysis was conducted to analyze sound levels at Kate Smith School and provide retrofitting to reduce sound levels through a Federal Aviation Administration grant.

== See also ==
- List of airports in Nevada
- Reno Stead Airport (RTS), location of the Reno Air Races
