= Nevada Air National Guard =

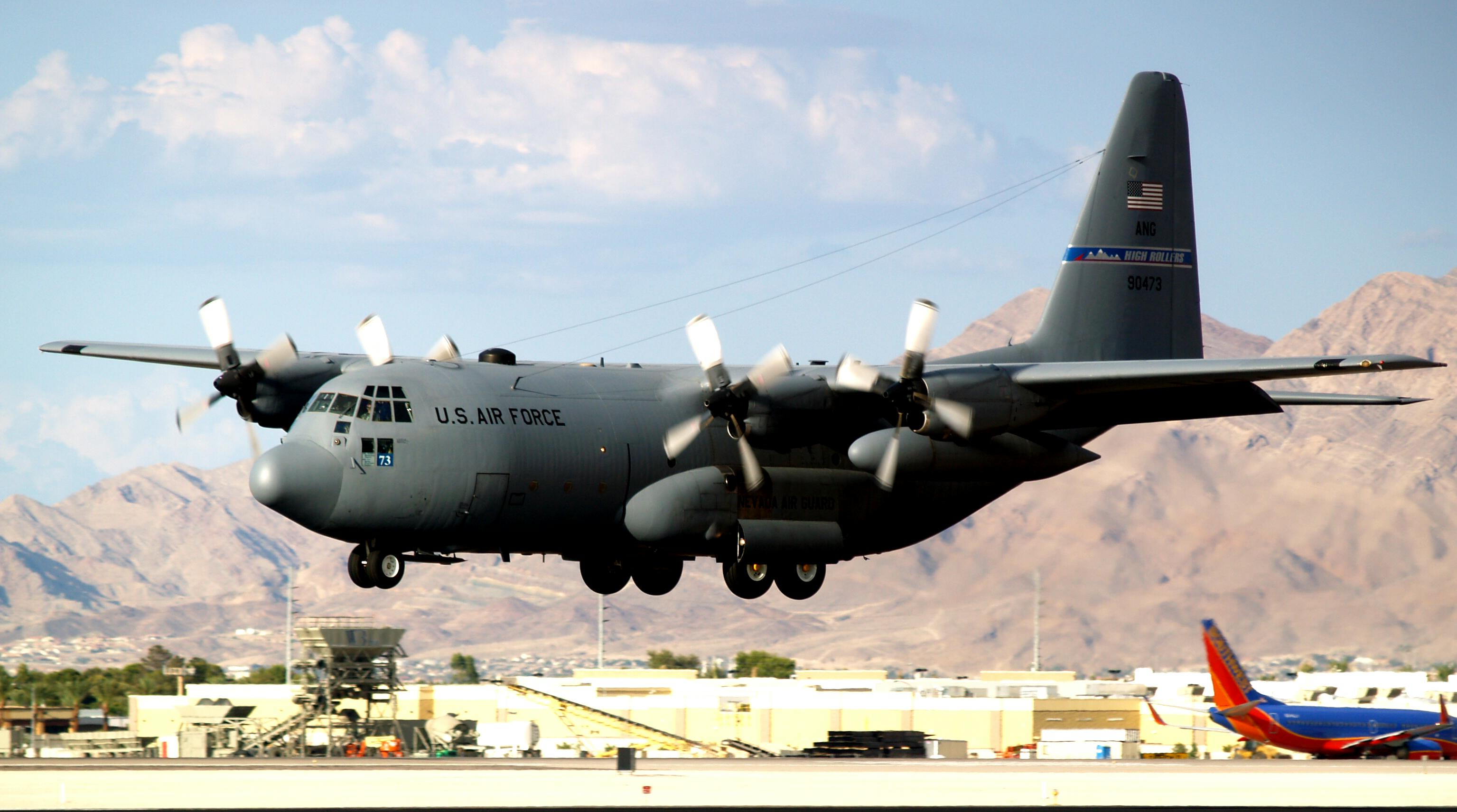
- A C-130H Hercules of the 152nd Airlift Squadron landing at McCarran in 2008. The 192nd is the oldest unit in the Nevada Air National Guard, having over 60 years of service to the state and nation.
- Active: 12 April 1948 – Present
- Country: United States
- Allegiance: Nevada
- Branch: Air National Guard
- Type: State militia, military reserve force
- Role: "To meet state and federal mission responsibilities."
- Part of: Nevada National Guard; Nevada Military Department; National Guard Bureau
- Garrison/HQ: Nevada Joint Force Headquarters, 895 East Richards Street, Fallon, Nevada, 89406

Commanders
- Civilian leadership: President Donald Trump (Commander-in-Chief); Troy Meink (Secretary of the Air Force); Governor Joe Lombardo (Governor of the State of Nevada)
- State military leadership: Major General Ondra L. Berry

Insignia
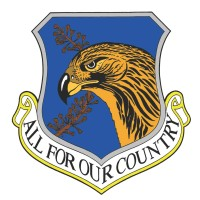
- Nevada Air National Guard emblem

Aircraft flown
- Reconnaissance: MQ-1 Predator (UAV)
- Transport: C-130H Hercules

The Nevada Air National Guard is the aerial militia of the State of Nevada, United States of America. Along with the Nevada Army National Guard, it is an element of the Nevada National Guard of the larger United States National Guard Bureau. It is a reserve of the United States Air Force. The units of the Nevada Air National Guard are not in the normal United States Air Force chain of command. They are under the jurisdiction of the governor of Nevada through the office of the Nevada Adjutant General unless it is federalized by order of the president of the United States.

The Nevada Air National Guard is headquartered at the Nevada Joint Force Headquarters, in Carson City, Nevada. Its commander is currently Major General Ondra L. Berry.

== Overview ==
Under the "Total Force" concept, Nevada Air National Guard units are considered to be Air Reserve Components (ARC) of the United States Air Force (USAF). Nevada ANG units are trained and equipped by the Air Force and are operationally gained by a major command of the USAF if federalized. In addition, the Nevada Air National Guard forces are assigned to Air Expeditionary Forces and are subject to deployment tasking orders along with their active duty and Air Force Reserve counterparts in their assigned cycle deployment window.

Along with their federal reserve obligations, as state militia units the elements of the Nevada ANG are subject to being activated by order of the governor to provide protection of life and property, and preserve peace, order and public safety. State missions include disaster relief in times of earthquakes, hurricanes, floods and forest fires, search and rescue, protection of vital public services, and support to civil defense.

Overall, the Nevada Air National Guard maintains a presence in three of the state's 17 counties with a 64-acre (260,000 m^{2}) site on the southwest corner of the Reno-Tahoe International Airport in Reno, a detachment on Nellis Air Force Base in Las Vegas and at Creech Air Force Base in Indian Springs. About 65 Nevada Guard airmen work at the southern-Nevada detachment that began operation in 2005.

Staff reports at the conclusion of the fiscal year revealed that the Nevada Air Guard reported 102 percent of its authorized manning (1,101 airmen). In fact, with its 102 percent of authorized airmen, the Nevada Air Guard had one of the highest strength levels in the entire Air National Guard in October 2006.

== Components ==
The Nevada Air National Guard consists of the following major unit:

- 152nd Airlift Wing

Established 12 April 1948 (as: 192nd Fighter Squadron); operates: C-130H Hercules Tactical Airlift aircraft
Stationed at: Reno Air National Guard Base, Reno
Gained by: Air Mobility Command
Performs tactical airlift providing rapid airlift and airdrop of cargo and troops. Also flies Intelligence, Surveillance, and Reconnaissance (ISR) operations using "Scathe View" advanced electro-optical and infrared sensors in support of military command and control operations, counter drug operations, disaster relief and photo mapping for federal and state agencies.

Support Units:

- 232nd Operations Squadron

Established 2005; operates: MQ-1 Predator
Stationed at: Creech Air Force Base, Indian Springs
Gained by: Air Combat Command
Operates MQ-1 as an associate unit with the USAF 432d Operations Group executing global unmanned aerial systems, combat support, and humanitarian missions.

- 92nd Civil Support Team

A joint force unit comprising 22 soldiers and airmen headquartered at Nellis Air Force Base, Las Vegas. The unit, for Weapons of mass destruction, began operation in late 2004 and promises to be an important resource and asset to the state should a domestic chemical, biological or nuclear event occur.

== History ==
On 24 May 1946, the United States Army Air Forces, in response to dramatic postwar military budget cuts imposed by President Harry S. Truman, allocated inactive unit designations to the National Guard Bureau for the formation of an Air Force National Guard. These unit designations were allotted and transferred to various State National Guard bureaus to provide them unit designations to re-establish them as Air National Guard units.

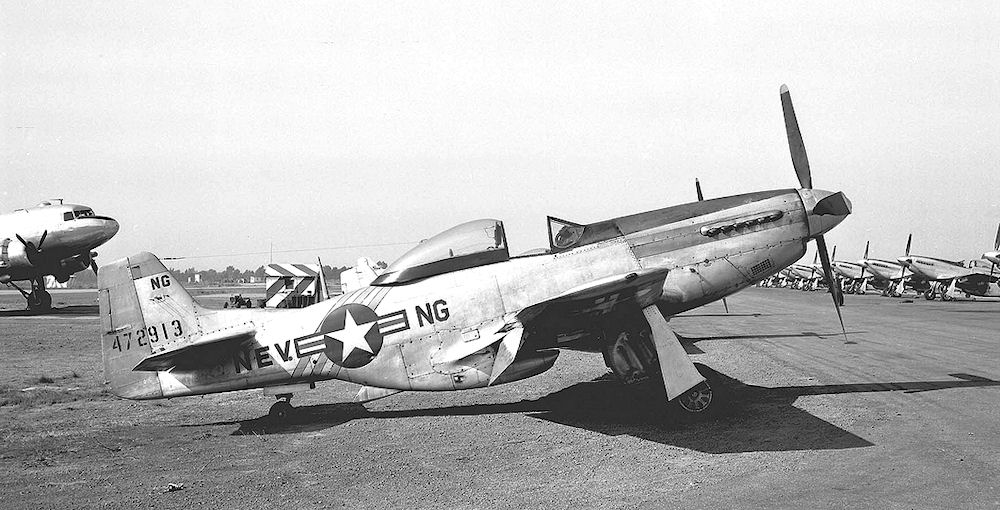
A North American F-51D Mustang of the 192d Fighter Squadron at Reno Air Force Base, 1948

The Nevada Air National Guard origins date to the formation of the 192nd Fighter Squadron at Reno Air Force Base, receiving federal recognition on 12 April 1948. It was equipped with F-51D Mustangs and its mission was the air defense of the state. On 19 April 1958, the 192nd Fighter-Interceptor Squadron was authorized to expand to a group level, and the 152nd Fighter-Interceptor Group was allotted by the National Guard Bureau, extended federal recognition and activated.

Today, the 152nd Airlift Wing has a primary wartime mission of providing rapid airlift and airdrop of cargo and troops. They can also fly reconnaissance missions in support of military command and control operations, counter drug operations, disaster relief and photo mapping for federal and state agencies. The 232nd Operations Squadron at Creech Air Force Base, Indian Springs is an associate unit of the USAF 432nd Wing, operating the MQ-1 Predator UAV reconnaissance aircraft. The 92nd Civil Support Team is trained in WMD response.

After the September 11th, 2001 terrorist attacks on the United States, elements of every Air National Guard unit in Nevada has been activated in support of the global war on terrorism. Flight crews, aircraft maintenance personnel, communications technicians, air controllers and air security personnel were engaged in Operation Noble Eagle air defense overflights of major United States cities. Also, Nevada ANG units have been deployed overseas as part of Operation Enduring Freedom in Afghanistan and Operation Iraqi Freedom in Iraq as well as other locations as directed.

== See also ==
- Nevada Wing Civil Air Patrol
