= Nevada Wing Civil Air Patrol =

Highest echelon of Nevada Civil Air Patrol

- Nevada Wing of Civil Air Patrol

Associated branches
- United States Air Force

Command staff
- Commander: Col. Peter Goertzen
- Chief of Staff: Maj. Michael Cleveland

Current statistics
- Cadets: 468
- Seniors: 405
- Total Membership: 873
- Website: nvwg.cap.gov
- Statistics as of October 2025

The Nevada Wing of Civil Air Patrol (CAP) is the highest echelon of Civil Air Patrol in the state of Nevada. Nevada Wing headquarters are located in Reno, Nevada. The Nevada Wing consists of over 800 cadet and adult members at locations across the state of Nevada.

== Mission ==
Civil Air Patrol executes its three primary missions: providing emergency services; offering cadet programs for youth; and providing aerospace education for Civil Air Patrol members and the general public. Website: https://nvwg.cap.gov

=== Emergency services ===
Members of Civil Air Patrol (CAP) perform emergency services for state and local agencies as well as the federal government as the civilian auxiliary of the U.S. Air Force and for states/local communities as a nonprofit organization. CAP members assist in times of disaster, search for the lost, and protect the homeland. CAP also provides aid during humanitarian aid and disaster relief missions. CAP offers Air Force support through the conducting of light transport, communications support, and low-altitude route surveys.

=== Cadet Programs ===
Civil Air Patrol's cadet program transforms youth into dynamic Americans and aerospace leaders through a curriculum that focuses on leadership, aerospace, fitness, and character. As cadets participate in these four elements, they advance through a series of achievements, earning honors and increased responsibilities along the way. Many of the nation's astronauts, pilots, engineers, and scientists first explored their careers through CAP.

=== Aerospace Education ===
The Civil Air Patrol operates an aerospace education program designed to promote aerospace, aviation, and STEM-related fields. The program provides standards-based curriculum and hands-on activities intended to support educational and career development for youth, both within and outside of its cadet program.

== Nevada Wing History ==
Nevada Wing was chartered on 18 December 1941 and contributed to the nation through search and rescue and military support roles during the Second World War. Since then, Nevada Wing has provided search and rescue (SAR) capabilities throughout the nation's seventh largest state. It took the lead in the nation's largest SAR event, the 2007 Steve Fossett Search. Read more here: https://nvwg.cap.gov/about/nevada-wings-80th-anniversary

== Organization ==
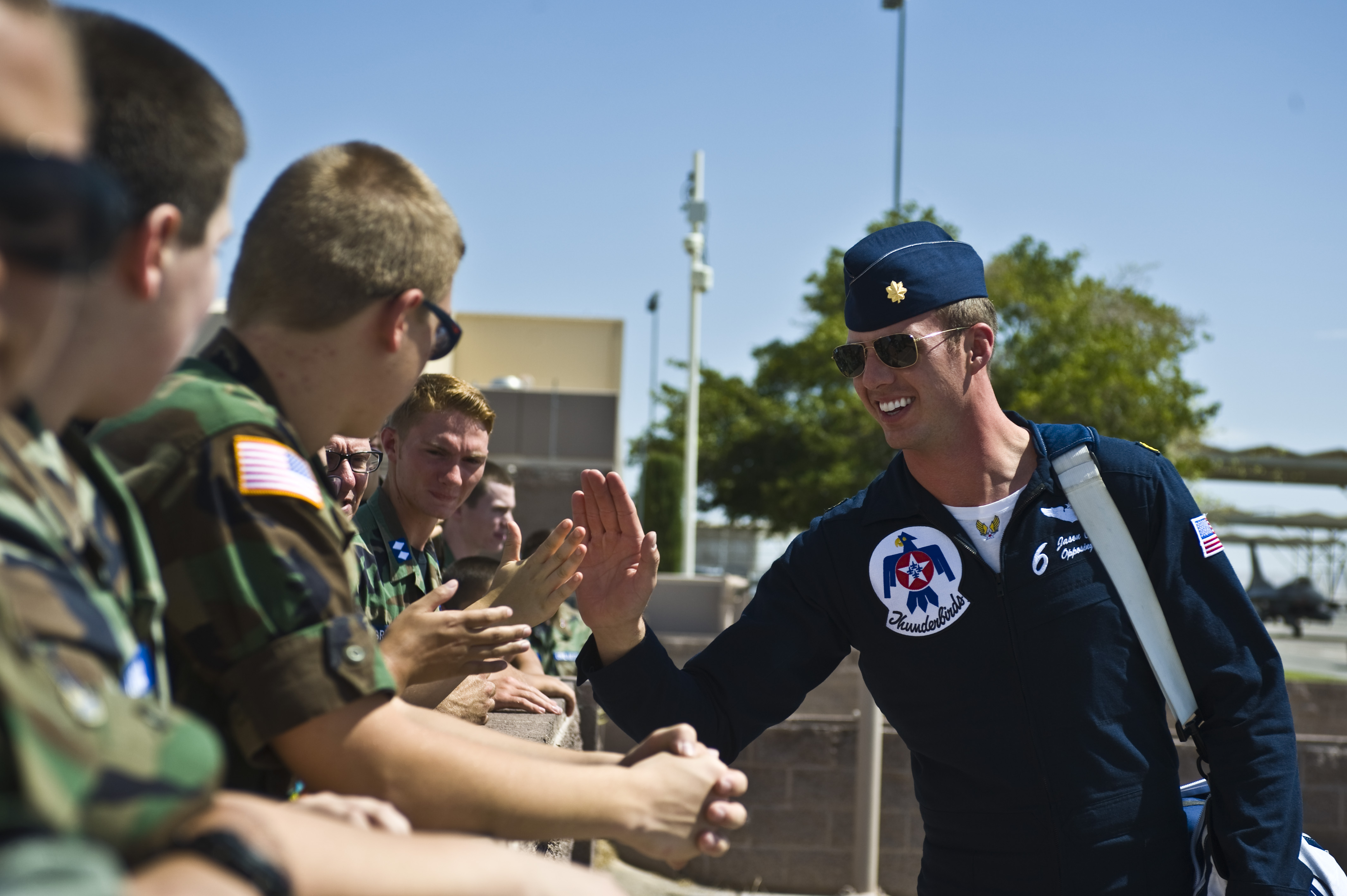
Maj. Jason Curtis, U.S. Air Force Air Demonstration Squadron no. 6 pilot, interacts with Civil Air Patrol cadets at Nellis Air Force Base.

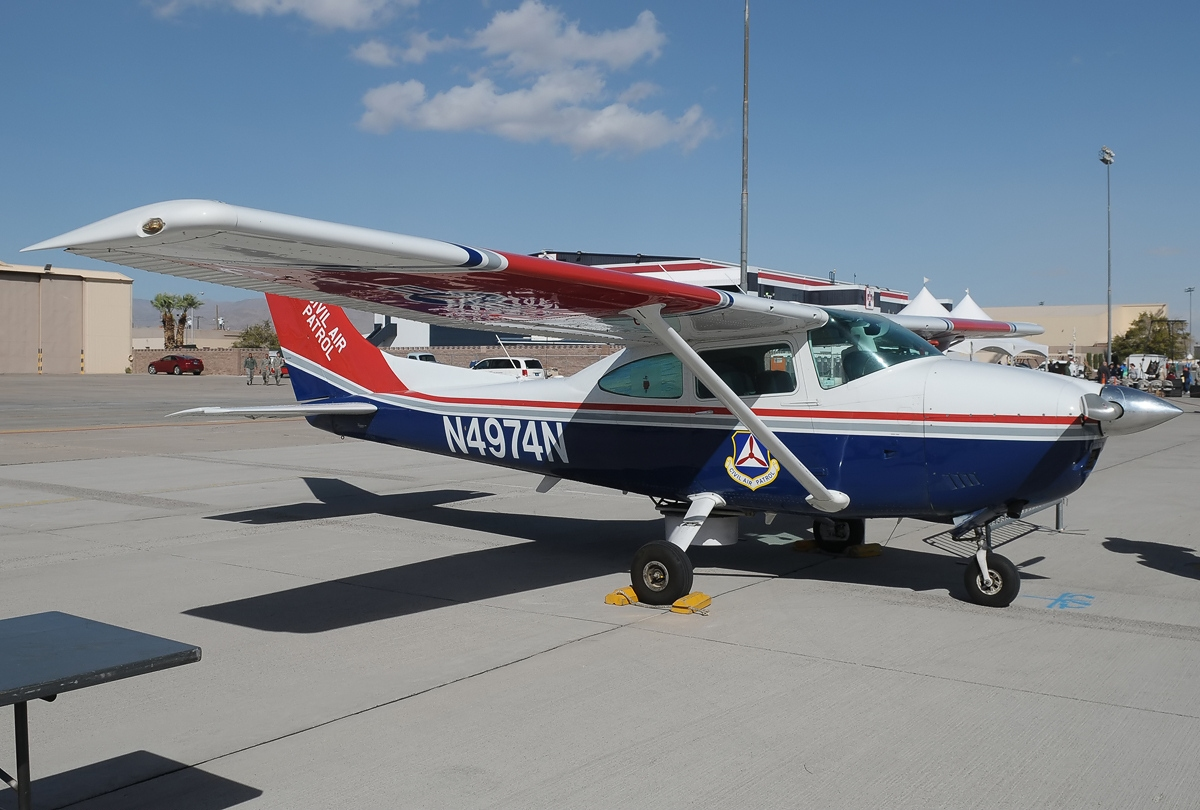
A Civil Air Patrol aircraft on the tarmac at Nellis Air Force Base in Las Vegas.

Squadrons of the Nevada Wing
	Squadron	Website
NV027	Tahoe Truckee Composite Squadron	Truckee
NV029	Elko Composite Squadron	Elko
NV047	Carson City Composite Squadron	Carson City
NV051	Pahrump Valley Composite Squadron	Pahrump
NV054	Reno Composite Squadron	Reno
NV064	Nellis Senior Squadron	Las Vegas
NV065	Henderson Composite Squadron	Henderson
NV067	Douglas County Composite Squadron	Minden
NV068	Humboldt County Composite Squadron	Winnemucca
NV070	Las Vegas Composite Squadron	Las Vegas
NV077	Vegas Valley Composite Squadron	Las Vegas
NV090	Red Rock Cadet Squadron	Las Vegas
NV802	Jack Schofield Cadet Squadron	Henderson

== See also ==
- Awards and decorations of Civil Air Patrol
- Nevada Air National Guard
