= Dearborn mosque bombing plot =

Terrorist plan

The Dearborn mosque bombing plot was an incident on January 24, 2011, when American man Roger Stockham was arrested and charged with terrorism and possession of illegal fireworks in the parking lot of Islamic Center of America, a Shia mosque in Dearborn, Michigan.

Stockham, then 63 years old and a resident of Imperial Beach, California had made threatening statements towards the mosque, and was arrested in the parking lot with powerful class C fireworks in his vehicle. including M-80s. Possession of such fireworks is a felony in Michigan with up to 15 years imprisonment; the terrorism charge can carry up to 20 years.

Police chief Roger Haddad described Stockham and the threat he posed as "very dangerous" and "very serious"; at the time Stockham was arrested, there were 500 worshippers inside the mosque. According to Haddad, Stockham had a history of anti-government activity and run-ins with law enforcement agencies elsewhere. Stockham was arrested after the police received a tip from a bar employee who had overheard Stockham making violent threats. Haddad said Stockham was likely acting alone. Dearborn mayor John O'Reilly commented on the incident, saying that the explosives Stockham had, "if used in a building could cause tremendous harm".

In 2012, Stockham took a plea deal to Federal charges of making a terrorist threat, agreeing to plead guilty but mentally ill.

== Stockham's background ==
Stockham is a United States Army Vietnam War veteran who was based in Pleiku. He had written on his MySpace page: "Proud of my kids. Happy with how much I've lived. Ready for it to be over, but have a policy I contend with often: So long as I am alive, I can't play dead."

In 1977, Stockham armed himself with a gun and two bombs, took his psychologist hostage for four hours in a Century City office building. An assault charge was dropped after he pleaded guilty to an explosives charge and was sentenced to probation and time served.

On September 1, 1979, the San Bernardino County Sun reported that Stockham, whom it described as a "32-year-old Moslem [sic] convert", had taken his then-9-year-old son Kane out of foster care and brought Kane and a gun on board his rented Cessna 150 in attempt to land at Los Angeles International Airport and hijack an airliner to take him to Iran. While on bond, he was arrested two weeks later for setting a Lompoc oil tank on fire stating that he was "kind of down on the oil companies." Stockham was convicted of kidnapping in the airplane incident and arson for the Lompoc explosion but deemed legally insane and sent to Patton State Hospital instead of prison. Despite having escaped for four months, he was released on probation in 1982 and ordered to remain in out-patient treatment.

At one point he was also accused of threatening President Jimmy Carter.

In 1985, Stockham was arrested at Reno-Cannon International Airport for planting a pipe bomb and carrying an unregistered firearm, an incident covered in the Los Angeles Times. Aged 38 at the time, he was described as having mental and criminal problems. According to psychiatrists, he believed he was Jesus Christ and that extraterrestrials had taken over his body.

Stockham was a member of his local chapter of Veterans of Foreign Wars (VFW) in 2011. In his profile on the VFW website, he is described as a "typical surfer" whose other hobbies include water skiing, sailing, and go cart racing. He was at one point a commercial bush pilot in Indonesia. In 2002 he pled not guilty by reason of insanity to threatening to blow up a Veterans Administration center in Vermont and making threats against President George W. Bush. He was released from a prison medical center in 2005 and told not to drink; the bar attendant who reported him to police the day of the bombing attempt reported that he was drinking scotch at the time.

== Court developments ==
Stockham rejected his court-appointed attorney because he claimed the attorney was a Shi'ite Muslim who worships at the Islamic Center: “I reject my appointed counsel. He is a Shi'ite and I am not” he said, before he was cut off by 19th District Judge Mark Somers. It was also revealed that Stockham was a convert to Islam, spoke Arabic during the preliminary interview, and quoted Qur'anic verses.

His newly appointed attorney also insisted his client isn't anti-Muslim as Stockham had converted to Islam soon after serving in Vietnam in 1974 and spoke of his outrage over U.S. conduct in Iraq. The chairman of the board for the Islamic Center of America, Afif Jawad, who attended the hearing, said he and other leaders continue to meet with local and federal law enforcement officials about the incident. Jawad stated: "This man knows what he's doing" and "This man picked on the Shiites....That's a threat to the community."

The manager at the Detroit bar Stockham visited before his arrest, said Stockham claimed to be part of a group of Indonesian Mujahideen, or holy warriors.

== Reactions and aftermath ==
On January 28, 2011, Imam Sayyid Hassan al-Qazwini of the Islamic Center of America addressed the Shi'ite Muslim community regarding the plot. According to al-Qazwini, the police indicated to him that Stockham had said to the police that he regarded Timothy McVeigh as his role model.

His defense attorney claimed Stockham did not have matches or a lighter in his possession when arrested, calling into question the idea Stockham seriously intended to carry out his supposed plan.
