= 152nd Airlift Wing =

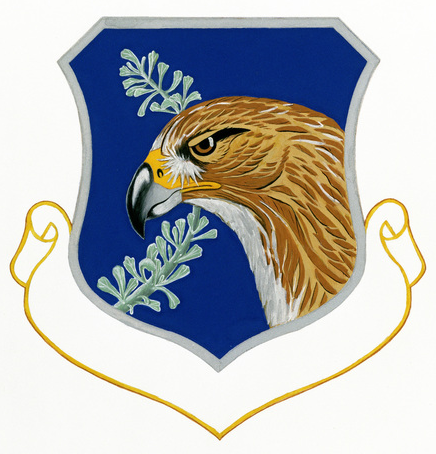
152nd Airlift Wing

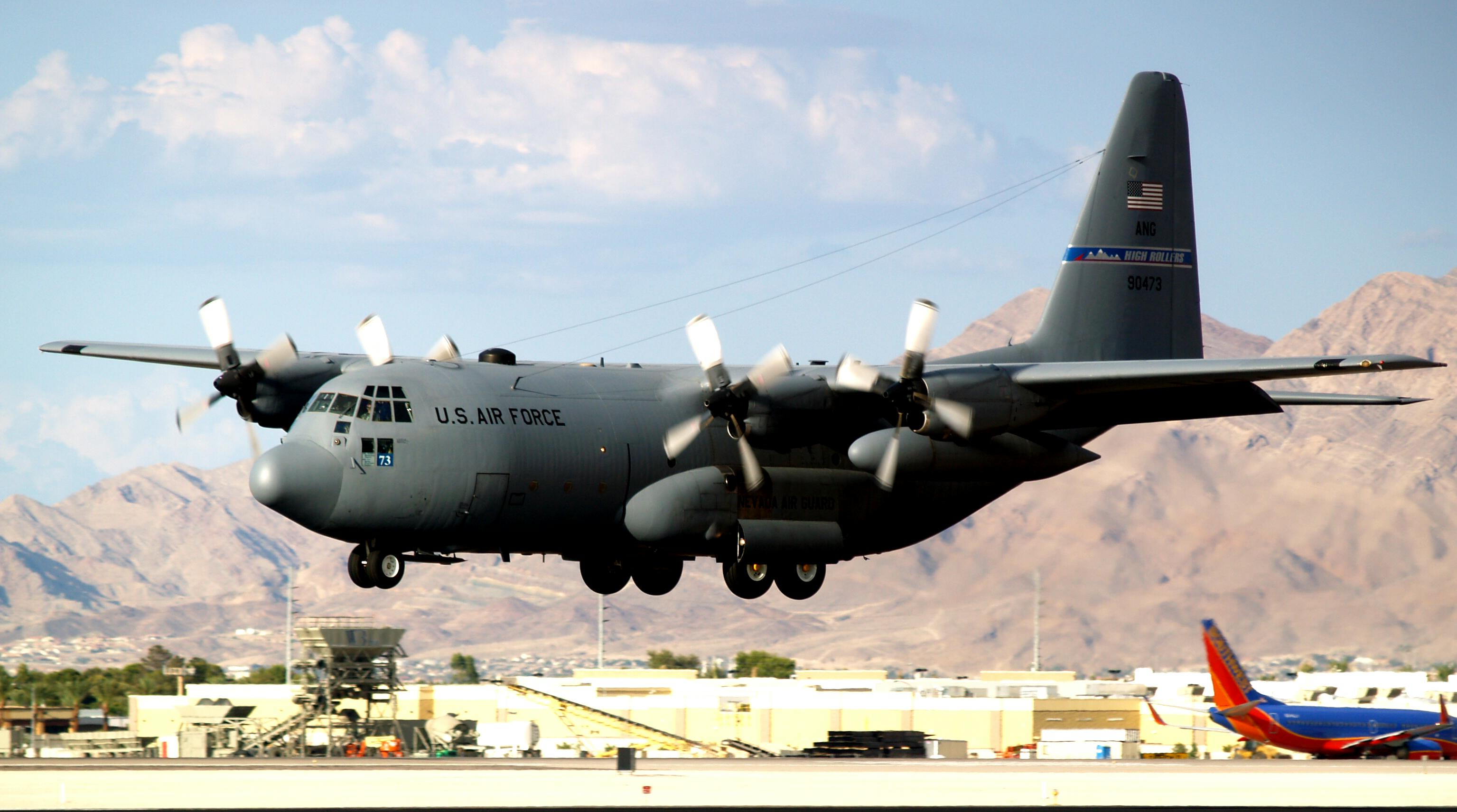
- 152nd Airlift Wing C-130 landing at May ANGB
- Active: 1958-present
- Country: United States
- Allegiance: Nevada
- Branch: Air National Guard
- Type: Wing
- Role: Airlift
- Part of: Nevada Air National Guard
- Garrison/HQ: May Air National Guard Base, Reno, Nevada
- Nickname: High Rollers
- Motto: The Eyes of Victory
- Decorations: Air Force Outstanding Unit Award

Insignia
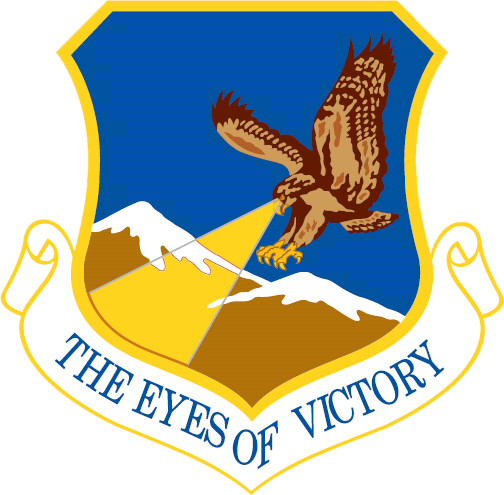
- 152d Airlift Wing emblem
- Tail stripe: Bluestripe, "High Rollers"

The 152nd Airlift Wing is a unit of the Nevada Air National Guard, stationed at Nevada Air National Guard Base, Nevada. If activated to federal service with the United States Air Force, the Wing is operationally gained by the 18th Air Force of the Air Mobility Command.

== Mission ==
The Nevada Air National Guard's 152nd Airlift Wing has a primary wartime mission of providing rapid airlift and airdrop of cargo and troops. They can also fly specialized reconnaissance missions in support of military command and control operations, counter drug operations, disaster relief and photo mapping for federal and state agencies. The unit is tasked to deploy anywhere on the globe within an assigned response time to perform both day and night missions.

In addition to the wartime mission, the 152nd Airlift Wing also has a peacetime mission to train combat ready aircrew and assigned personnel. The unit has a State mission and has been called on numerous occasions to support local state emergencies such as fires, floods, riots and search and rescue operations.

The mission is accomplished with eight assigned Lockheed C-130 Hercules transport aircraft. Force structure developments in the Air National Guard during Fiscal Year 2000 focused on equipment upgrades providing enhanced capability for Air National Guard units, which previously led to the 152nd Airlift Wing converting from the C-130E to the C-130H. This conversion also included a modification which provided an additional Intelligence, Surveillance, and Reconnaissance asset package to the Air National Guard called Scathe View for carriage by C-130 aircraft. It features forward-looking infrared, daylight TV, spotter scope, and laser range- finder.

== Organization ==
- 152nd Airlift Wing
  - 152nd Operations Group
    - 152nd Operations Support Squadron
    - 152nd Intelligence Squadron
    - 192nd Airlift Squadron with C-130H Hercules
    - 232nd Combat Training Squadron, at Nellis Air Force Base
  - 152nd Maintenance Group
    - 152nd Maintenance Squadron
    - 152nd Aircraft Maintenance Squadron
    - 152nd Maintenance Operations Flight
  - 152nd Mission Support Group
    - 152nd Civil Engineer Squadron
    - 152nd Force Support Squadron
    - 152nd Logistics Readiness Squadron
    - 152nd Security Forces Squadron
    - 152nd Communications Squadron
  - 152nd Medical Group

== History ==
On 19 April 1958, the Nevada Air National Guard 192d Fighter-Interceptor Squadron was authorized to expand to a group level, and the 152nd Fighter Group (Air Defense) was established by the National Guard Bureau. The 192nd FIS becoming the group's flying squadron. Other squadrons assigned into the group were the 192nd Headquarters, 192nd Material Squadron (Maintenance and Supply), 192nd Combat Support Squadron, and the 192nd USAF Dispensary. The 152nd was assigned to Air Defense Command. Also in 1958, the 192nd's day-only North American F-86A Sabres were sent to other units and the 192nd received the day/night/all-weather North American F-86L Sabre aircraft.

=== Tactical Reconnaissance ===
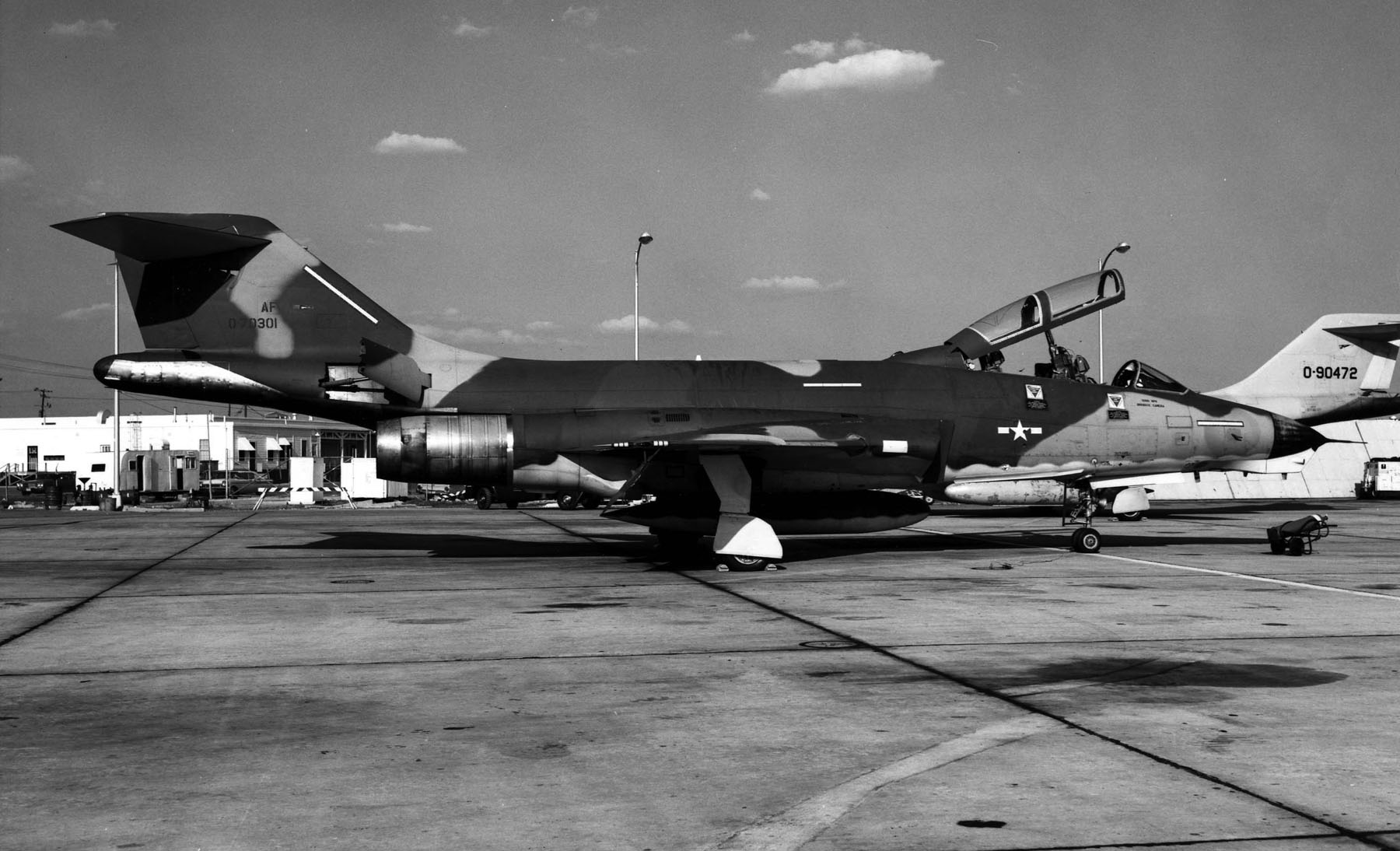
The 192nd TRS was the sole operator of the RF-101B.

In 1961 Air Defense Command was reorganizing and the 192nd was transferred to Tactical Air Command. TAC redesignated the 152nd as the 152nd Tactical Reconnaissance Group, and equipped it with RB-57B Canberra reconnaissance aircraft. Tactical reconnaissance would be the mission of the unit for the next 30 years. The RB-57s were the reconnaissance version of the B-57 Canberra light bomber, which has replaced the World War II B-25 Mitchell during the Korean War. The RB-57s were used by the active-duty Air Force beginning in the mid-1950s and it began to be sent to Air National Guard units in the late 1950s when the McDonnell RF-101A Voodoo entered service.

The 192nd used the RB-57s primarily to carry out photographic surveys of areas hit by natural disasters such as hurricanes or tornadoes. It was placed on alert during the 1961 Berlin Crisis and 1962 Cuban Missile Crisis, however it was not activated or deployed overseas.

In 1965 the McDonnell RF-4C Phantom II began to enter active USAF service, and the 192nd received supersonic McDonnell RF-101H Voodoos to replace the subsonic RB-57s. The unit served during the 1968 Pueblo Crisis. On 26 January 1968 the Nevada Air National Guard was called to active duty as part of a national effort to meet the threat posed by North Korean seizure of the U.S. Navy ship the "USS Pueblo." During the next 16 months, Nevada Air Guardsmen served in Korea, Japan, Vietnam, Thailand, the Philippines, North Africa and some 18 bases within the United States. During this tour, the 192nd Reconnaissance Squadron was awarded the 5th Air Force Outstanding Unit Award, only the second unit selected for this honor. All Nevada Air National Guard units were released from active duty on 9 June 1969.

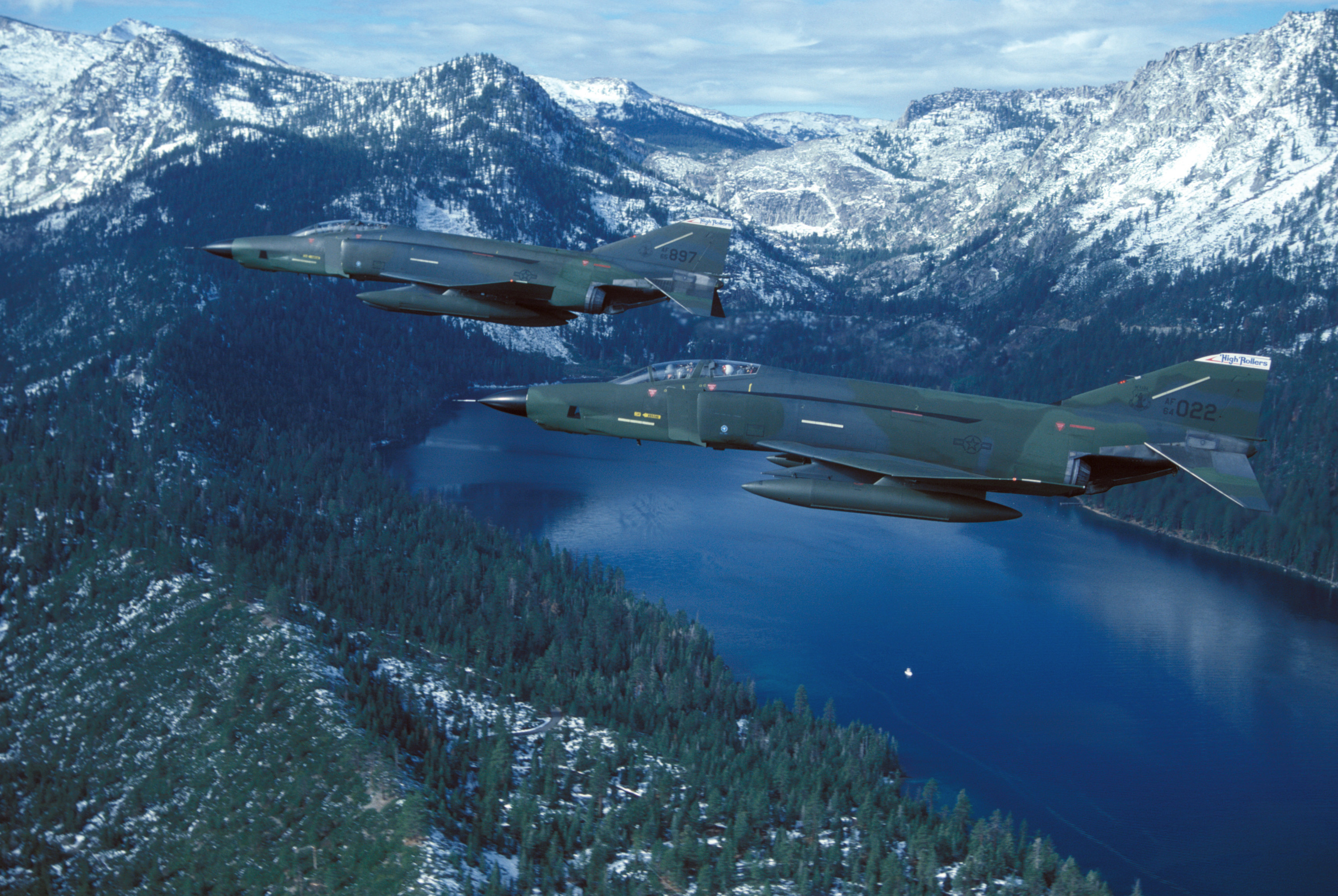
192nd TRS RF-4Cs, 1985.

In 1971, the RF-101Hs were replaced by RF-101B Voodoos that were re-manufactured after serving in the Canadian Air Force. However, unlike the F-101Hs, the "B" model was extremely expensive to operate in the field, requiring several costly and time-consuming fixes in order to maintain an acceptable operating standard. The career of the RF-101B with the Nevada ANG was relatively brief, giving way to the RF-4C Phantom II in 1975.

The 192nd Tactical Reconnaissance Squadron operated the RF-4C Phantom for nearly 20 years. The RF-4C was still in service at the time of the 1990 Gulf Crisis and in response to the Iraqi invasion of Kuwait, the 106th Tactical Reconnaissance Squadron of the 117th Tactical Reconnaissance Wing of the Alabama Air National Guard was deployed to Sheik Isa Air Base in Bahrain. This unit was redeployed in December 1990 and the 152nd was deployed. Falling in on the Portable Photography and Interpretation Facility the High Rollers dug in and operated from Sheik Isa through Desert Shield and Desert Storm. With combat operations beginning in January as part of Operation Desert Storm, the 192nd flew combat missions in the RF-4C.

When the first strikes against Iraq started on 17 January 1991, the RF-4Cs were in action from the start. At first, they were limited to daylight operations, flying over Kuwait almost every day in search of Iraqi Republican Guard units. They flew over Baghdad looking for such targets as rocket fuel plants, chemical weapons plants, and command and communications centers. Later, the RF-4Cs were regularly diverted from other photographic missions to go and look for Scud launchers hiding in western Iraq. No RF-4Cs were lost in action and eventually flew over 1,000 combat hours and 350 combat flying missions. The unarmed Nevada aircraft took over 19,000 photographic prints using 300,000 feet of film without a single target lost from processing. Legend has it, the Commander, Colonel "Woody" Clark was credited with the only known Combat kill of an enemy fighter by a reconnaissance aircraft. During one mission Col Clark and his wing-man were approached by Iraqi air force jets. Unarmed and unafraid, they prepared for rapid departure by dropping their fuel cells to bug out. Woody's fuel cell is said to have struck one of the approaching Iraqi Fighters. The High Rollers have been the stuff of legend for many years.

Following the end of Desert Storm, Reno and the State of Nevada gave the High Rollers a parade. Most members understood this was the Country's way of making up for past failure by recognizing them and all Veterans. With a 1992 reorganization of the Air Force, the group's gaining command shifted from the disestablishing Tactical Air Command to the newly established Air Combat Command. The group and flying squadron also dropped the word "tactical" from their titles and became simply the 152nd Reconnaissance Group and 192nd Reconnaissance Squadron.

The RF-4Cs began their retirement from USAF and Air National Guard service in the early 1990s. The 192nd RS finally turned in its last four RF-4Cs on 27 September 1995, their planes being flown to Davis-Monthan Air Force Base for storage. These aircraft were the last RF-4Cs in operational service, and with their retirement the era of RF-4C service with the U.S. Air Force came to an end.

=== Current operations ===
The Nevada Air National Guard began the conversion to a new aircraft and mission in October 1995, with training and construction to support the Airlift mission and the Pacer Coin Reconnaissance mission. The unit received its first Lockheed C-130E Hercules aircraft on 9 April 1996, and became an operational Airlift Wing in April 1997.

Pacer Coin was a day/night, all-weather reconnaissance and surveillance system which provided imagery intelligence support to theater and other commanders in support of drug interdiction operations for U.S. Southern Command. The unit assumed this mission when it converted to the C-130E Hercules in October 1995. The Nevada Air Guard had the only Pacer Coin aircraft in the inventory. The special sensors and optics on-board provided photo reconnaissance capability.

The 152nd also took part in "Operation Joint Guard" (August 1997 – December 1997) in support of peacekeeping operations in Bosnia. The unit deployed one aircraft and 130 personnel to provide reconnaissance support to the region with its Pacer Coin capability. Operating from Aviano Air Base, Italy, the unit was scheduled to remain in-theater for approximately 60 days, but was not returned home until after 104 days. Their deployments complete, the Pacer Coin aircraft was retired on 15 May 1998.

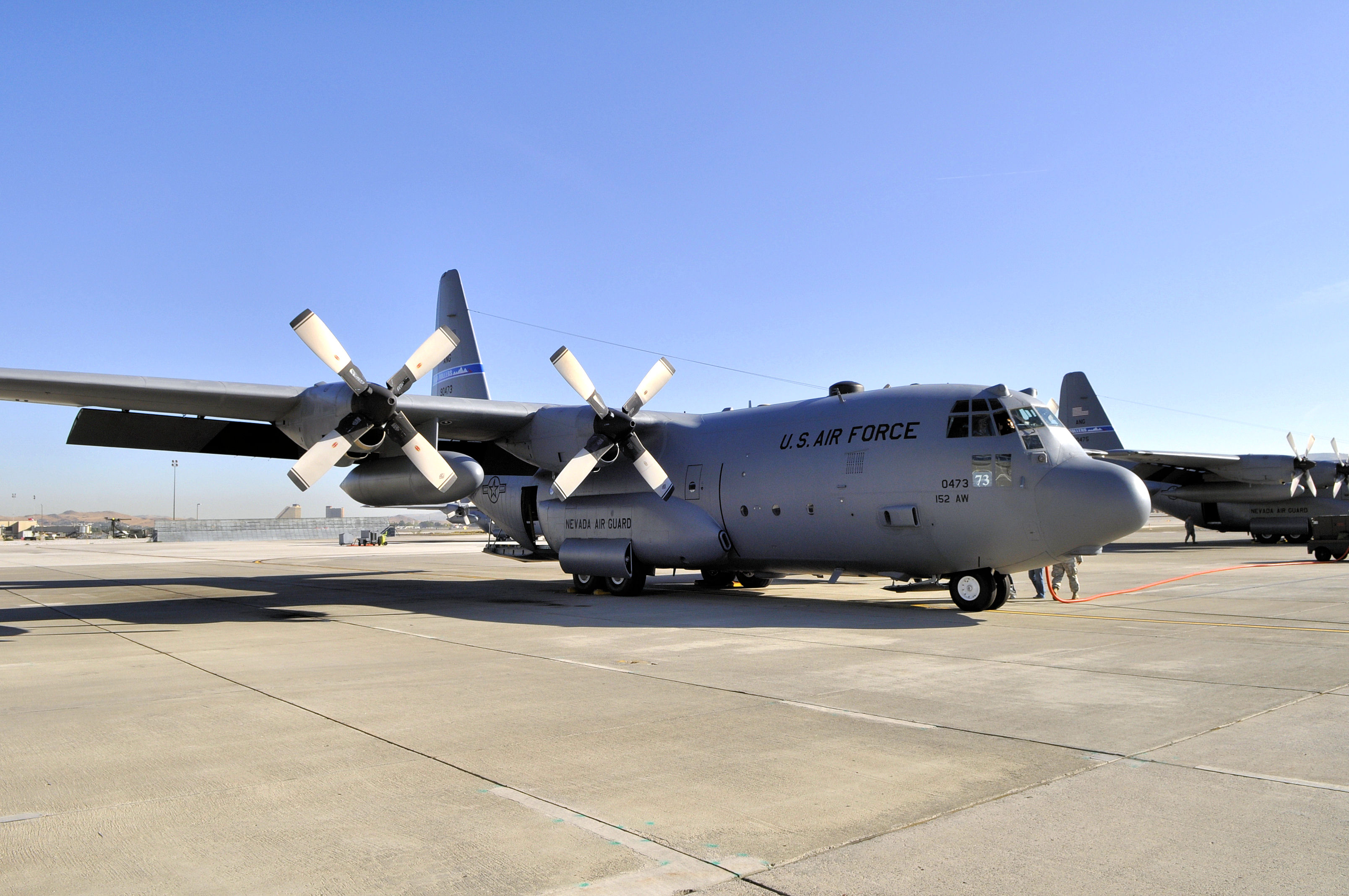
192d Airlift Squadron - Lockheed C-130H Hercules

In May 1998, the United States military group Commander Ecuador, requested the Nevada Air National Guard to send experienced individuals that could interface with the Ecuadorian Air Force, Army, and civilian mapping agency personnel. The purpose was to train them in the planning and execution of photo reconnaissance to assist them in their efforts to overcome the drug trafficking problems in their country. A week prior to the actual exercise to test the new methods and information, personnel from the 152nd AW deployed to Mariscal Sucre International Airport, Quito to conduct training and classes aimed at improving the skills of Aircrew and Photo Interpreters. Classes were conducted for a week with classroom training as well as practical exercises.

The 152nd Airlift Wing began conversion from the C-130E to the C-130H in 1998. This conversion also included a modification, which provided additional Intelligence, Surveillance, and Reconnaissance asset to the Air National Guard called Scathe View. Scathe View is composed of a high-endurance, adverse weather-operable, specially modified C-130H aircraft; a roll-on/roll-off sensor control and communications pallet operated by 2 on-board airborne imagery analysts; and the Wescam (subsequently L-3) MX-15 "pentasensor", a day or night capable imagery sensor with a laser range finder and a laser illuminator. The Scathe View system disseminates intelligence data and information directly to ground forces in real time via on-board voice and data communications suites.

Scathe View had been an essential component of search and rescue, aerial mapping and Humanitarian Relief Operations (HUMRO) during post-Hurricane Katrina operations in 2005.

In September 2007, the Nevada Air National Guard utilized the Scathe View system in the search for millionaire adventurer and pilot Steve Fossett. The 152nd Intelligence Squadron, part of the Nevada Air National Guard's 152nd Airlift Wing, was the only unit at that time equipped with the Scathe View system.

As of 2007, the 152nd Intelligence Squadron had 8 C-130H aircraft fitted with the system. At that time it was also planned to upgrade the MX-15 sensor and to provide a Beyond Line of Sight capability, allowing passing of data to intermediate higher headquarters and worldwide users.

== Lineage ==
- Established as the 152nd Fighter Group (Air Defense) and allotted to Nevada ANG in 1958

Extended federal recognition and activated on 19 April 1958
Redesignated 152nd Tactical Reconnaissance Group on 1 March 1961
Federalized and placed on active duty on 26 January 1968
Released from active duty and returned to Nevada state control on 7 June 1969
Redesignated 152nd Reconnaissance Group on 15 March 1992
Redesignated 152nd Airlift Wing 1 January 1996

=== Assignments ===
- Nevada Air National Guard, 19 April 1958

Gained by: 28th Air Division, Air Defense Command
Gained by: Reno Air Defense Sector, Air Defense Command, 15 February 1959
Gained by: Tactical Air Command, 1 March 1961
Gained by: Air Combat Command, 1 June 1992
Gained by: Air Mobility Command, 1 April 1997-Present

=== Components ===
- 152nd Operations Group, 1 January 1996
- 192d Fighter-Interceptor Squadron (later 192nd Tactical Reconnaissance, 192nd Reconnaissance, 192nd Airlift Squadron), 19 April 1958 – 1 January 1996

=== Stations ===
- May Air National Guard Base, Nevada, 19 April 1958 – present

=== Aircraft ===
- F-86L Sabre Interceptor, 1958-1961
- RB-57B Canberra, 1961-1965
- RB-57A Canberra, 1965
- RF-101H Voodoo, 1965-1971
- RF-101B Voodoo, 1971-1975
- RF-4C Phantom II, 1975-1995
- C-130E Hercules, 1996-1998
- C-130H Hercules, 1998–Present

== Decorations ==
- Air Force Outstanding Unit Award
