= Meadowood Mall =

Shopping mall in Reno, Nevada, United States

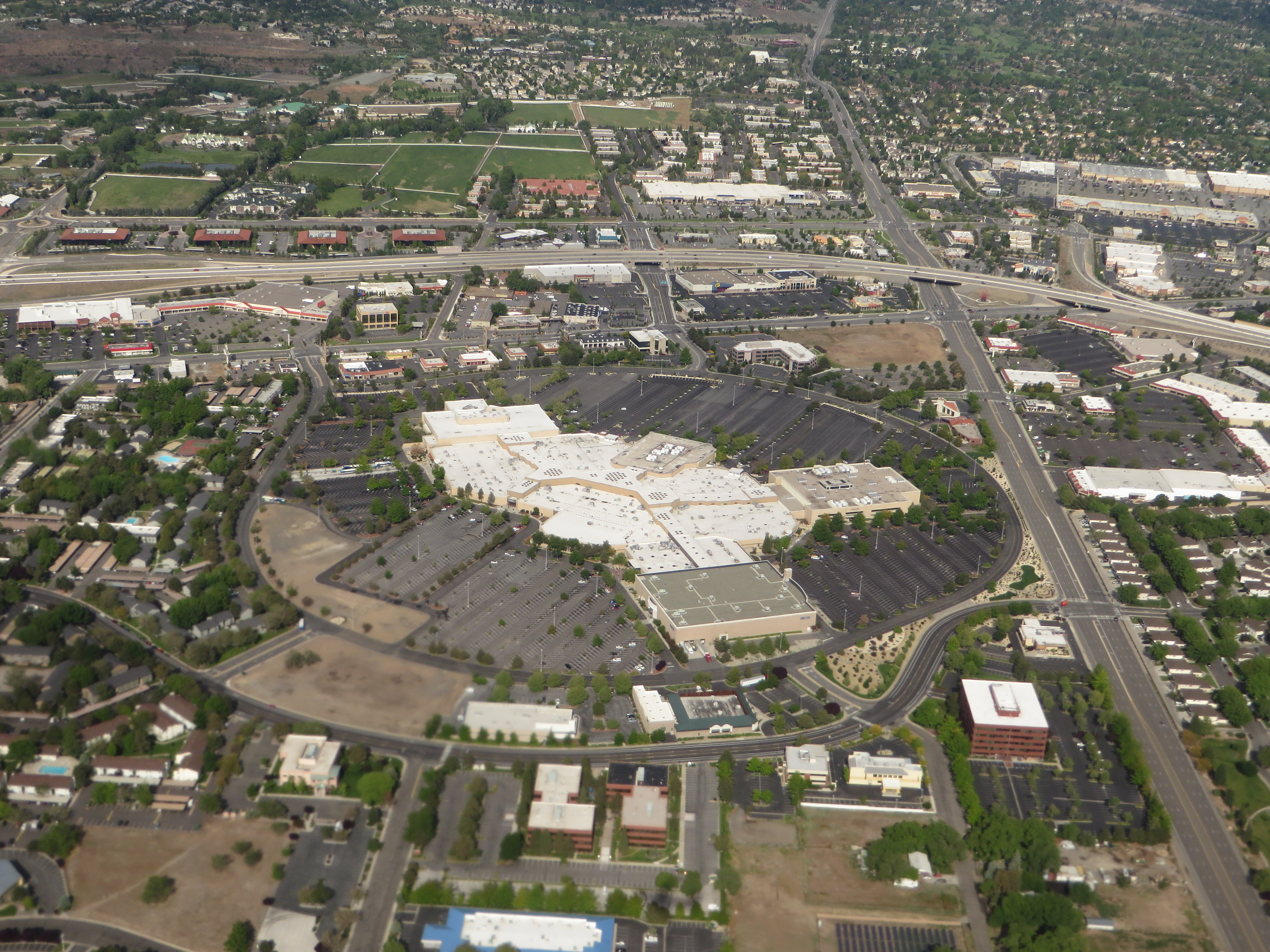
- Meadowood Mall, Reno, Nevada
- Location: Reno, Nevada United States
- Coordinates: 39.474183°N 119.782476°W
- Opened: March 1979
- Developer: Taubman Centers
- Manager: Simon Property Group
- Owner: Simon Property Group (50%)
- Num. of stores: 125
- Num. of anchor tenants: 5
- Floor area: 901,357 square feet (83,738.8 m^{2})
- Floors: 1 (2 in JCPenney, both Macy's locations, and former Sears)
- Parking: Free, uncovered
- Website: www.simon.com/mall/meadowood-mall

Meadowood Mall is a one-level, 901,357-square-foot (83,738.8 m^{2}) super-regional mall in Reno, Nevada, managed by Simon Property Group, which owns 50% of it. Meadowood Mall contains 125 retailers and restaurants and it is anchored by Macy's Women, Macy's Men/Home, JCPenney, Round One Entertainment, and Dick's Sporting Goods.

== History ==
Meadowood Mall opened in March 1979 anchored by JCPenney, Liberty House, and Macy's. Liberty House closed in 1983 and Macy's South moved in the following year. The mall added a Copeland's Sporting Goods Superstore in 1989 as a fourth anchor. An expansion in 1995 added Sears as a fifth anchor, with additional in-line shops, and the Palms Food Court, now no longer referred to as Palms Food Court after the 2013 renovation. Following Copeland's bankruptcy filing in 2006, the company was acquired by Sports Authority. Meadowood Mall's superstore was subsequently re-branded, despite Sports Authority having a stand-alone location less than a mile away. Due to operating costs of having two stores in such a close proximity, the Meadowood location was closed in 2011. The mall underwent cosmetic renovations and inline expansions in 2013 and added Dick's Sporting Goods in a newly constructed anchor location in 2016. In 2015, Sears Holdings spun off 235 of its properties, including the Sears at Meadowood Mall, into Seritage Growth Properties. Meadowood Mall currently features 125 shops, a food court and one full-service restaurant. On April 20, 2018, it was announced that Sears would be closing as part of a plan to close 42 stores nationwide. The store closed in July 2018. Seritage leased half of the first level of the former Sears into Round One Entertainment which opened in the space.

=== 1995 Expansion ===
Despite renovations, nearby Park Lane Mall struggled to compete with Meadowood Mall and had been failing to retain tenants for several years. The Taubman Company, which owned Meadowood Mall at the time, took advantage and was able to woo several tenants from Park Lane as part of an expansion project. The most notable addition was Sears, which built a two-story anchor location on the north end of the mall, with a new hallway and several new inline store locations leading to the new anchor. The addition also created space for a food court, named the Palms Food Court, to house 12 eateries.

=== Ownership Changes ===
The mall was built and operated by Taubman Company for its first two decades. GM Pension Trust acquired the mall from Taubman in 1998 in exchange for equity it had in the mall company. In April 2004, GM Pension Trust sold the mall to the Mills Corporation, which, in turn, was bought by Simon Property Group in 2007.

=== 2013 Modernization ===
The 2006 opening of the upscale Summit Sierra Marketplace in south Reno coupled with the 2008 opening of Legends at Sparks Marina in Sparks, NV left Meadowood Mall trailing in shopping destinations for the region despite it being the lone enclosed mall in the region. As a result, Simon Properties and the mall announced plans for a $3.5 million renovation to bring new stores, restaurants, and a much needed facelift updating the 1970s decor as well as adding more seating areas and device charging stations for mall patrons. The announcement made on 22 January 2013 included the following new stores: Vans scheduled to open in August in a location vacated by The Disney Store, Pink by Victoria's Secret, scheduled to open in May, and Forever 21, scheduled to open in July.

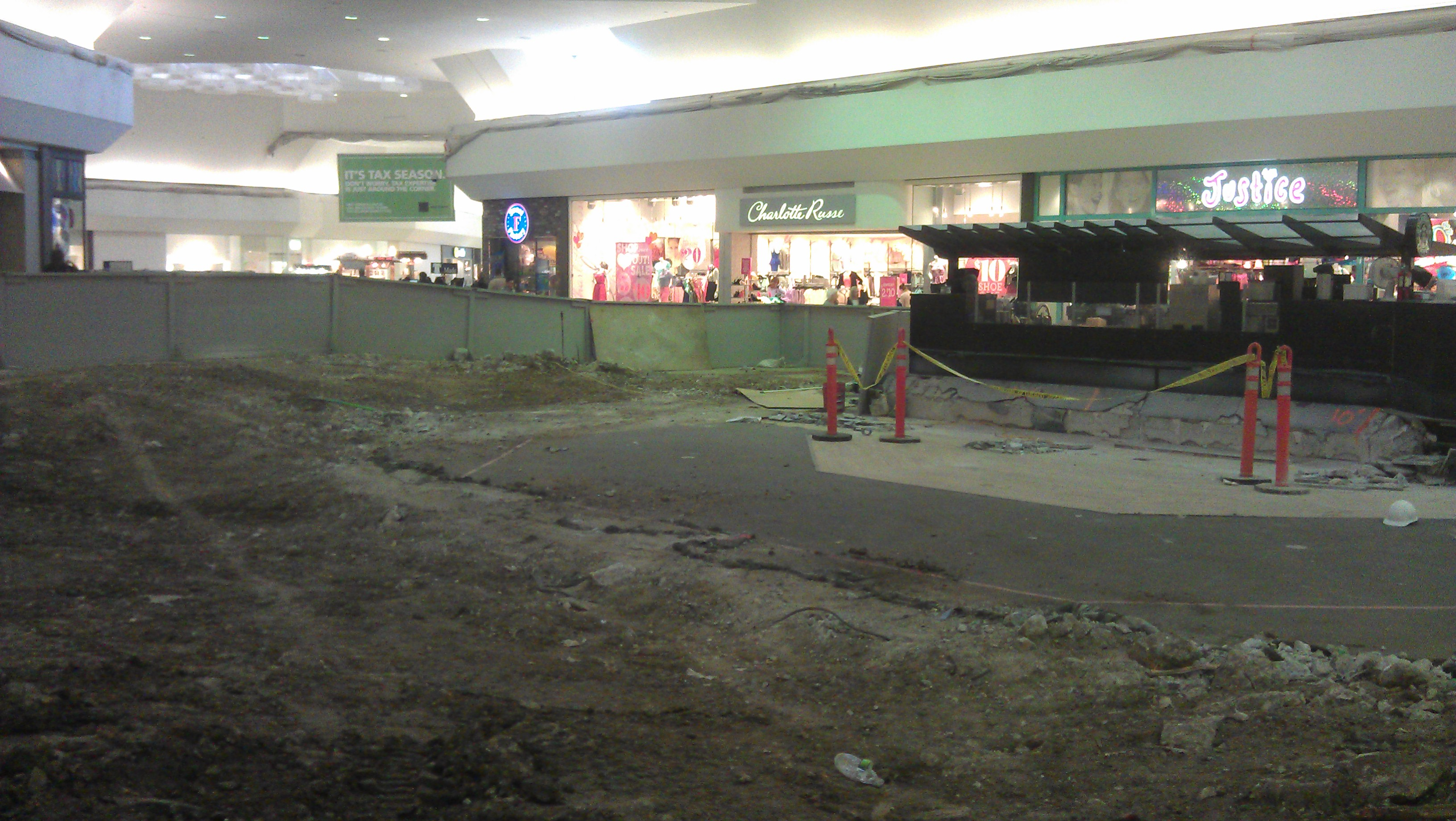
Center Court at the mall during construction, 2013

As part of the renovation, many existing tenants relocated to larger, renovated locations closer to the center of the mall and the food court. These moves gave new tenants opportunities to expand into large format stores built from two or three previous tenants. The new Forever 21 store occupied a space from three previous tenants: Borders (seasonally occupied by Go Games and Calendars in 2012), Buckle (seasonally occupied by Toys"R"Us Express in 2012) and Claire's. Buckle relocated within the mall in 2012; Claire's relocated into their Icing brand store which was closed. Additionally, Champs Sports moved to a renovated location vacated by PacSun and Kiddie Kandids and Spencer's relocated to the former No Fear location to create space for a new H&M location. Victoria's Secret temporarily moved, as Pink took their current location near center court. The new Victoria's Secret store was built adjacent to the new Pink store.

The renovation also includes updated restrooms and a new private nursing area for mothers.

== Layout ==
Meadowood Mall has a unique semicircular design, with a straight corridor leading to Round One. A large food court can be found near Round One. Many of the stores in between the anchors are upscale, with many health and beauty and high-end clothing shops. A restaurant and small casino can be found near several entrances.
