= Kiddie Kandids =

American portrait photography chain

Kiddie Kandids was a nationwide chain of U.S. children's portrait studio based in Utah. The Kiddie Kandids chain had locations in Babies R Us superstores and malls.

== History ==
The company filed for bankruptcy in January 2010 and closed nearly 200 stores.
