= Regional Transportation Commission of Washoe County =

Government agency in Nevada, US

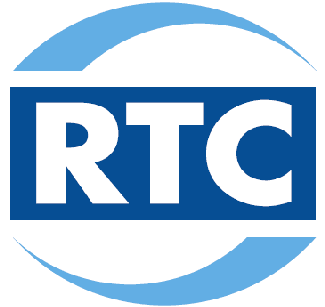
- Founded: 1979; 47 years ago by the Nevada Legislature
- Headquarters: Reno, Nevada, U.S.
- Locale: Northern Nevada
- Service area: Washoe County
- Service type: Bus service, paratransit, express bus service, highway construction and transportation planning
- Daily ridership: 16,300 (weekdays, Q4 2025)
- Annual ridership: 5,947,200 (2025)
- Operator: Keolis (RIDE); MTM (ACCESS)
- Chief executive: Bill Thomas
- Website: rtcwashoe.com

The Regional Transportation Commission of Washoe County (RTC or RTC Washoe) is the public body responsible for the transportation needs throughout Reno, Sparks and Washoe County, Nevada. The RTC, founded by the Nevada Legislature in 1979, is an amalgamation of the Regional Street and Highway Commission, the Regional Transit Commission and the Washoe County Area Transportation Study Policy Committee. They provide public transportation services, street and highway construction, and transportation planning. In 2025, the system had a ridership of 5,947,200, or about 16,300 per weekday as of the fourth quarter of 2025.

== Public transportation ==
=== RTC Ride ===
RTC RIDE is the public transit bus system. From its inception as Citifare in the late 1970s, the system has since been rebranded and has grown to include a service area of approximately 60 square miles (160 km^{2}) and an annual ridership of 8.5 million.

==== History ====
===== Citifare era (1978–2004) =====
During the early part of the 20th century, streetcars provided public transportation between Reno and Sparks and served Downtown Reno, the University of Nevada, and the early suburbs of Reno. By the late 1920s, the streetcars became unprofitable and the tracks were removed. The Regional Transportation Commission of Washoe County (RTC) created the Citifare bus system after several decades of substandard private bus transit. Citifare service began on September 17, 1978 with five used buses serving four routes. Throughout the next twenty five years, the system grew to a fleet of 75 buses operating 30 routes. These years also saw the construction of two transit centers—CitiCenter in Downtown Reno in 1984 and CitiStation near Victorian Square in Downtown Sparks. By 2003, the growing success of the system, coupled with planning efforts to incorporate bus rapid transit and transit oriented development into the community, lead the RTC to implement a rebranding of the entire organization, as well as Citifare, over the upcoming years.

===== RTC RIDE (2004–present) =====
With the rebranding of the entire organization, planning, streets and highways construction, and public transportation were streamlined to provide a better identity for the organization and to improve service to the community. Original Nova coaches were gradually replaced with low floor Gillig coaches. New logos and bus livery was implemented. New shelters and bus stop signage were also introduced. The RTC also began working on new capital projects to replace the aging CitiCenter and CitiStation transit terminals. In October 2008, RTC opened RTC Centennial Plaza in Sparks and the RTC Citicenter in downtown Reno was replaced by the new RTC 4th Street Station on October 31, 2010.

==== Fares ====
Children 5 years old or younger 6 ride free when accompanied by a fare-paying rider. Fares may be purchased on board in cash or purchased with an online or fax order form. Beginning in December 2016 passes are also available for purchase on the Token Transit mobile ticketing app.

Fares as of 6 October 2018:
RTC RIDE onboard fares
	Adult	Reduced	RTC ACCESS ID
Single ride	$2.00	$1.00	$0.75
Day pass	$3	$1.50	
Pre-purchased passes
	Adult	Reduced	RTC ACCESS ID
Single ride	$2.00	$1.00	
Day pass	$3.00	$1.50	
7-day pass	$14.50	$6.00	
31-day pass	$65.00	$32.50	
RTC REGIONAL CONNECTOR
	Adult	Reduced	RTC ACCESS ID
Single ride	$5.00	$2.50	$2.50
Single ride with transfer	$3.50	$1.50	$1.00
10-ride pass	$42.50	$21.25	

==== Routes ====
RTC RIDE operates on a hub and spoke system, with routes that radiate out from the transit centers and then returning in. It also operates on a pulse system that allows for timed transfers at the transit centers every fifteen minutes. Routes 1-19 generally operate in the Reno area and originate from RTC 4TH STREET STATION. Routes 20-29 generally operate in the Sparks area and originate from RTC CENTENNIAL PLAZA. Routes 50-59 generally operate in South Reno and originate from RTC MEADOWOOD MALL TRANSFER FACILITY.

- 1- South Virginia
- 2- 9th Street/Silverada/Sparks
- 4- West 7th
- 5- Sutro/Wedekind/Sun Valley
- 6- Arlington/Moana
- 7- Stead
- 9- Glendale/Kietzke
- 11- 4th Street/Prater Way/East Sparks
- 12- Airport Terminal/Neil/Meadowood Mall
- 13- Kirman/Locust/Park Lane
- 14- East Mill
- 15- Sutro/Selmi/TMCC
- 16- Idlewild
- 18- Glendale/Greg
- 21- Sparks Marina/East Prater
- 54- Mira Loma/Rock
- 56- South Meadows/Damonte Ranch

=== RTC Rapid ===
RTC RAPID is RTC's bus rapid transit system. RAPID consists of two routes with limited stops and higher frequencies.

==== Virginia Line ====
The RTC RAPID Virginia LINE operates along Virginia Street between Downtown Reno and Meadowood Mall. On March 8, 2020 the RTC extended the Virginia Line to the University of Nevada, Reno.

==== Lincoln Line ====
The RTC RAPID LINCOLN LINE operates along 4th Street and Prater Way between Downtown Reno and Victorian Square (RTC Centennial Plaza). RTC held a grand opening for the Lincoln line on 14 December 2018.

=== RTC Regional Connector ===
RTC REGIONAL CONNECTOR provides express bus service between Reno, Meadowood Mall, and Carson City.

=== RTC Sierra Spirit ===
RTC SIERRA SPIRIT was a popular circulator service operating every 20 minutes along Virginia Street in Downtown Reno between the University of Nevada, Reno and the Truckee River. This was replaced with the Temporary Route, "UNR-Midtown Direct" on 25 August 2019.

=== UNR-Midtown Direct ===
UNR-Midtown Direct is a temporary route introduced on 25 August 2019 to replace RTC Sierra Spirit and will be replaced with the RTC RAPID Virginia Line Service once the RTC RAPID Expansion is complete to UNR, basically replacing the route. This route operates every 30 minutes from Midtown Reno to the University of Nevada Reno along Virginia (Northbound) and Sierra (Southbound) Streets. This route was discontinued following the extension to UNR.

=== RTC Access ===
RTC ACCESS is the system's paratransit service

=== RTC FlexRide ===
RTC FlexRide is the system's on demand microtransit service serving Sparks/Spanish Springs, North Valleys, NW Reno/Sommersett, and South Meadows. An additional zone has been proposed, but not yet implemented in Southwest Reno.

=== RTC Smart Trips ===
In addition to public transportation, RTC RIDE, through their program RTC SMART TRIPS, provides services to assist those wishing to carpool for their commute.

==== RTC Vanpool ====
RTC VANPOOL is a membership-based service which allows commuters to rent a van for their commute. The van is driven by one of the members, who picks up and drops off other riders at an agreed-upon location. Expenses are shared by all riders, and subsidized by RTC.

==== RTC Trip Match ====
RTC TRIP MATCH is a free ride-matching program for the Truckee Meadows offered by RTC SMART TRIPS in partnership with Greenride.

== Streets & Highways ==
RTC's Streets and Highways program is a joint effort involving the City of Reno, the City of Sparks, the Washoe County, and RTC. Their primary responsibility is road repair and construction within their jurisdiction, specifically, regional roadways, high-traffic (greater than 5,000 avg. daily trips) streets, and roads that cross geographic barriers or that connect jurisdictions. Low-traffic and neighborhood streets are left to local jurisdictions.

== Planning ==
Perhaps RTC's most important duty is in the area of planning for the regions transportation needs. Planning is divided into long range and short range needs.

=== Long-range planning ===
The Regional Transportation Plan (RTP) is RTC's plan to create and maintain the long-term transportation requirements for the Truckee Meadows. It addresses travel by all modes including automobiles, transit, bicycles, pedestrians, aviation, rail and goods movement as well as transportation management strategies to make the system more efficient.

=== Short-range planning ===
The Regional Transportation Improvement Program (RTIP) is RTC's short-range plan to meet the current needs of the Truckee Meadows. Spanning 5 years (FY 2018–2022), the current plan was published on 1 October 2017.

== See also ==
- Regional Transportation Commission of Southern Nevada
- Public transportation in Nevada
