= 19th Special Forces Group =

Special Forces Group of the United States Army National Guard

19th Special Forces Group (Airborne)
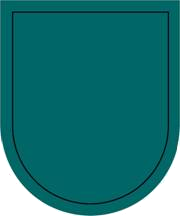
- 19th SFG(A) beret flash
- Founded: 5 July 1942
- Country: United States
- Branch: United States Army; Army National Guard
- Type: Special operations
- Role: Unconventional Warfare (UW); Foreign Internal Defense (FID); Direct Action (DA); Counter terrorism (CT); Counterinsurgency (COIN); Special reconnaissance (SR); Information operations (IO); Counterproliferation of WMD (CP); Security Force Assistance (SFA); Hostage Rescue; Combat Search and Rescue (CSAR)
- Size: 4 battalions
- Part of: 1st Special Forces Command and various state Army National Guard commands
- Garrison/HQ: Staff Sgt. Aaron Rhett Butler Special Forces Readiness Center, Camp Williams, Bluffdale, Utah
- Nicknames: Green Berets, Quiet Professionals, Soldier-Diplomats, Snake Eaters, Operators
- Mottos: Anything, Any Place, Any Time ; De oppresso liber (U.S. Army's translation: "To Liberate the Oppressed")
- Engagements: World War II Global War on Terrorism: Iraq War; War in Afghanistan; Operation Freedom's Sentinel

Commanders
- Current commander: COL Brian Pazzaglia

Insignia
- Former 19th SFG(A) recognition bar, worn by non-special operations qualified soldiers—in lieu of a beret flash—from the 1960s to 1984

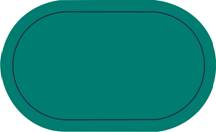
- Background trimming

- 1st Special Forces Command (Airborne) Distinctive Unit Insignia, worn by all SFG(A)s and 1st SFC(A)

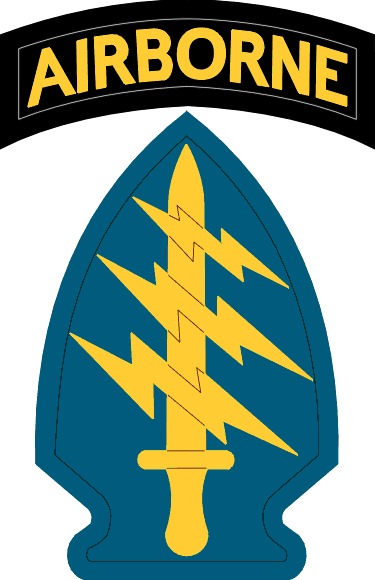
- 1st Special Forces Command (Airborne) shoulder sleeve insignia, worn by all 1st SFC(A) units

The 19th Special Forces Group (Airborne) (19th SFG(A)) is one of two Army National Guard groups in the United States Army Special Forces, along with the 20th Special Forces Group. The group is headquartered at Camp Williams, Utah, and has elements in California, Washington, Rhode Island, West Virginia, Ohio, Montana, Colorado, and Texas.

Like other Special Forces units, the 19th SFG(A) is trained for missions such as unconventional warfare, foreign internal defense, direct action, special reconnaissance, and counter-terrorism. The Utah National Guard describes the group as preparing and deploying special operations forces for missions around the world. As an Army National Guard unit, its elements may also respond to homeland threats, disasters, and other domestic missions when directed by their state governors. Current Army special operations doctrine states that Special Forces groups are regionally oriented and aligned to support combatant commanders and theater Army objectives.

== History ==
=== World War II lineage ===
The 19th Special Forces Group traces its official parent-unit lineage to the First Special Service Force, a joint American-Canadian special operations unit formed during World War II. The parent unit was constituted on 5 July 1942 in the Army of the United States as the 1st Company, 1st Battalion, Third Regiment, First Special Service Force. It was activated on 9 July 1942 at Fort William Henry Harrison, Montana, and disbanded on 6 January 1945 in France.

The First Special Service Force was organized as a combined American-Canadian force trained for special operations in difficult terrain and winter conditions. U.S. Army Special Forces groups trace their official lineage to the First Special Service Force, whose wartime service included operations in the Aleutian Islands, Italy, southern France, and the Rhineland.

=== Constitution and Army National Guard organization ===
19th SFG(A) Overview, circa 1961
U.S. Army overview of the 19th SFG(A), at the time of the unit's stand-up

The headquarters of the modern 19th Special Forces Group was reconstituted on 15 April 1960 in the Regular Army as Headquarters, 19th Special Forces Group, 1st Special Forces. On 1 May 1961, it was withdrawn from the Regular Army, allotted to the Army National Guard, and organized from existing units in Utah with headquarters at Fort Douglas.

During the 1960s and 1970s, the group was repeatedly reorganized as Special Forces units were aligned across several state Army National Guards. In 1963, the group consisted of elements in the Utah and Montana Army National Guard, and its headquarters location changed to Salt Lake City. By 1966, it included elements in Utah, Montana, Maryland, Rhode Island, New York, and West Virginia. In August 1967, the group was reported to be conducting training at Camp W. G. Williams for members of the Salt Lake County Jeep Posse, including instruction in guard work and escape-and-evasion procedures. A further reorganization between December 1967 and March 1968 added Colorado. During Exercise Wildcat in July 1968, about 1,300 members trained at Camp W. G. Williams and in nearby mountain areas, including night parachute infiltration, raids, ambushes, weapons, demolitions, communications, medical aid, intelligence, and air operations training. Later that week, the group hosted National Guard Special Forces soldiers from Maryland, Montana, and Rhode Island for unconventional-warfare training in Wasatch, Utah, and Summit counties.

The group continued to change structure during the 1970s. Between September 1972 and February 1973, it consisted of elements in Utah, Montana, New York, West Virginia, and Colorado. In 1975, it was reorganized to consist of elements in Utah, Montana, West Virginia, and Colorado. Rhode Island was again included in 1979, and later that year the group was reorganized to consist of elements in Utah, West Virginia, Colorado, and Rhode Island.

On 1 September 1996, the 19th SFG was reorganized to consist of elements in the Utah, California, Colorado, Ohio, Rhode Island, Washington, and West Virginia Army National Guards.

=== Global War on Terrorism ===
After the September 11 attacks, elements of the 19th SFG(A) supported Operation Enduring Freedom in Afghanistan. The U.S. Army Center of Military History identifies the 19th Special Forces Group as part of the special operations forces operating in Afghanistan during the early phase of the war, alongside the 5th Special Forces Group and the 160th Special Operations Aviation Regiment. The same history states that the 19th SFG(A), a National Guard unit from several states, later replaced the 5th Special Forces Group in Afghanistan.

Alpha Company, 1st Battalion, 19th SFG(A), also supported operations connected to the 2003 invasion of Iraq. After deploying to Kuwait in 2002 in support of Operation Desert Spring, the company trained with Kuwaiti forces and later prepared to support combat operations in Iraq. During the invasion, its operational detachments served primarily as Special Forces liaison elements with U.S. and coalition conventional forces, including the I Marine Expeditionary Force, 101st Airborne Division, 3rd Infantry Division, and British forces.

On 1 October 2005, the 1st Special Forces was redesignated as the 1st Special Forces Regiment. On 28 October 2005, 2nd Battalion, 19th SFG(A), was ordered into active federal service at home stations; it was released from active federal service and reverted to state control on 27 October 2006. The group was reorganized again on 1 September 2007 to include elements in the Utah, California, Colorado, Ohio, Rhode Island, Texas, Washington, and West Virginia Army National Guards. A second federal mobilization of 2nd Battalion began on 19 September 2008 and ended on 18 September 2009.

Members of the 19th SFG(A) also served in Afghanistan during Operation Freedom's Sentinel and Resolute Support. In April 2016, nine members of Alpha Company, 1st Battalion, 19th SFG(A), were recognized for valor during their recent deployment to Afghanistan. The awards included one Silver Star, two Bronze Star Medals with "V" device, and six Army Commendation Medals with "V" device. Several of the awards were connected to the 5 January 2016 battle in which Sergeant First Class Matthew Q. McClintock of Alpha Company was killed in action in Afghanistan.

=== Domestic support operations ===
During the George Floyd protests in June 2020, members of the 19th SFG(A) were among the National Guard forces sent to Washington, D.C., for civil-support operations. A National Guard Bureau spokesman confirmed that Utah Army National Guard Special Forces soldiers were present in the city and said they were selected because they were already prepared for deployment, not because of their Special Forces skill set. The deployment drew public attention after soldiers wearing Special Forces shoulder patches and tabs were photographed near the White House; National Guard commanders later directed the soldiers to remove the Special Forces identifiers from their uniforms to avoid sending an unintended message.

=== Headquarters facility ===
The group headquarters is located at the Staff Sgt. Aaron Rhett Butler Special Forces Readiness Center at Camp Williams, Bluffdale, Utah. The facility was dedicated on 9 August 2019 in memory of Staff Sgt. Aaron Rhett Butler, a Utah Army National Guard Special Forces soldier assigned to B Company, 1st Battalion, 19th SFG(A), who was killed in Afghanistan on 16 August 2017 while supporting Operation Freedom's Sentinel. Butler was posthumously awarded the Bronze Star Medal and Purple Heart, and was also recognized posthumously as a 2018 recipient of the Bronze Minuteman Award by the Honorary Colonels Corps of Utah. The readiness center is a more than 140,000-square-foot facility built to support the headquarters and 1st Battalion with administrative, classroom, training, and operations space.

== Structure ==
The 19th Special Forces Group (Airborne) is headquartered at Camp Williams, Utah, and includes elements in California, Washington, Rhode Island, West Virginia, Ohio, Montana, Colorado, and Texas. The Utah National Guard's 2021 annual report lists the group's major force-structure elements as Headquarters and Headquarters Company, Group Special Troops Company, Advanced Skills Detachment, Tactical Unmanned Aerial Systems Platoon, Military Intelligence Company, Group Support Battalion, 1st Battalion, 2nd Battalion, and 5th Battalion.

- Headquarters and Headquarters Company, 19th Special Forces Group (Airborne) – Camp Williams, Utah
- Group Special Troops Company – Utah
  - Advanced Skills Detachment – Utah
  - Tactical Unmanned Aerial Systems Platoon – Utah
  - Military Intelligence Company, 19th Special Forces – Utah
- Group Support Battalion – Utah
  - Headquarters and Headquarters Company, Group Support Battalion – Utah
  - Companies A, B, C, and D, Group Support Battalion – Utah
- 1st Battalion – Utah, Washington, and Texas
  - Headquarters and Headquarters Company and Battalion Support Company – Utah
  - Company A – Washington
  - Company B – Utah
  - Company C – Texas
- 2nd Battalion – West Virginia, Ohio, and Rhode Island
- 5th Battalion – Colorado, California, and Texas
- 190th Chemical Reconnaissance Detachment – Montana Army National Guard

== Gallery ==
19th Special Forces Group
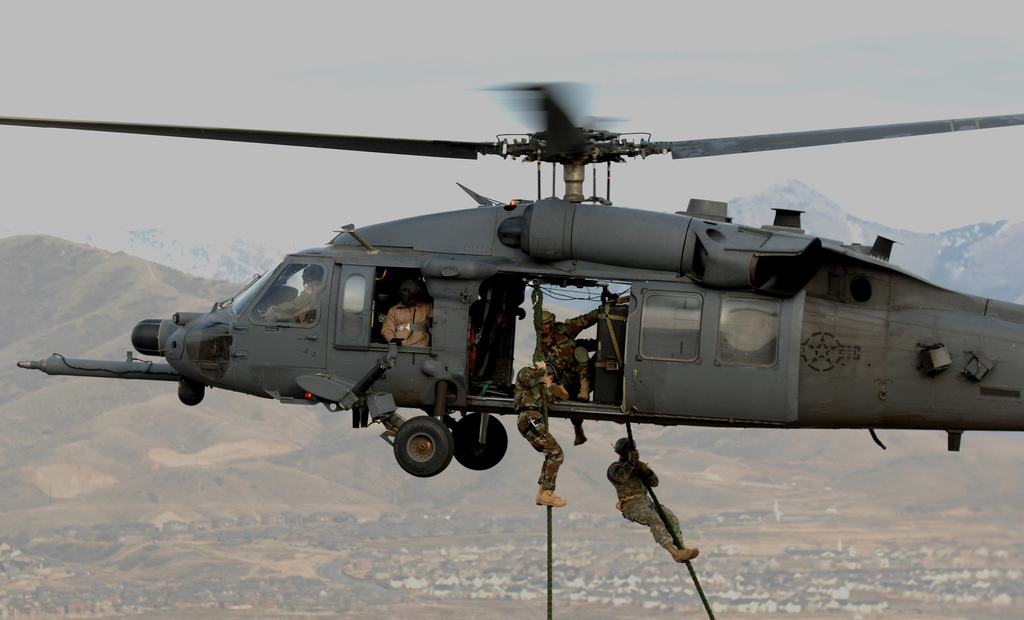
Soldiers from the 19th Group "Fast Roping" from an Air Force HH-60 Pave Hawk helicopter at the Utah Test and Training Range in November 2007, during CSAR integration exercises.

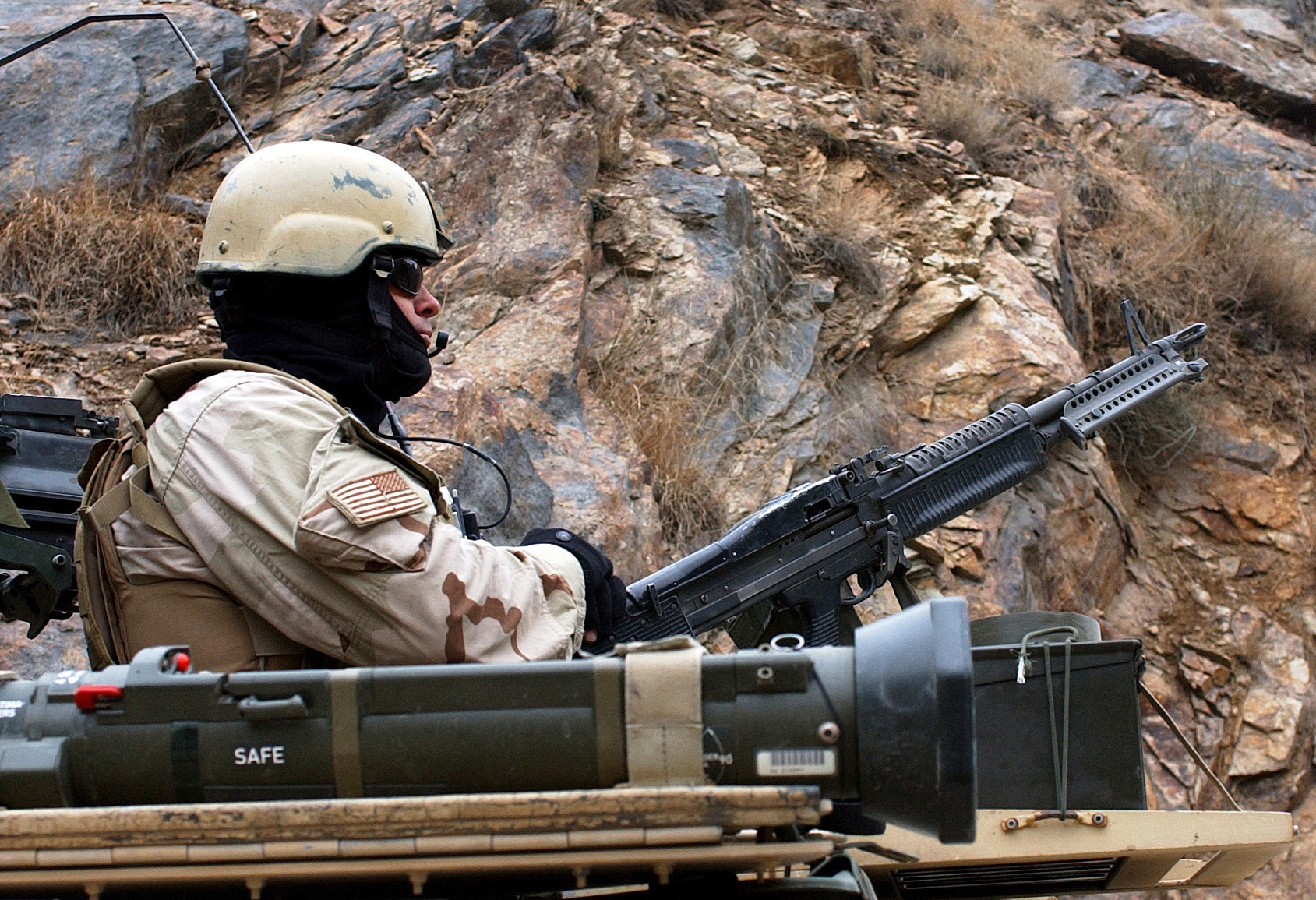
A 19th Group soldier on a Ground Mobility Vehicle variant Humvee provides security with a turret mounted M60 machine gun during a convoy stop in Asadabad, Afghanistan in 2004. An AT4 can be seen in the foreground.

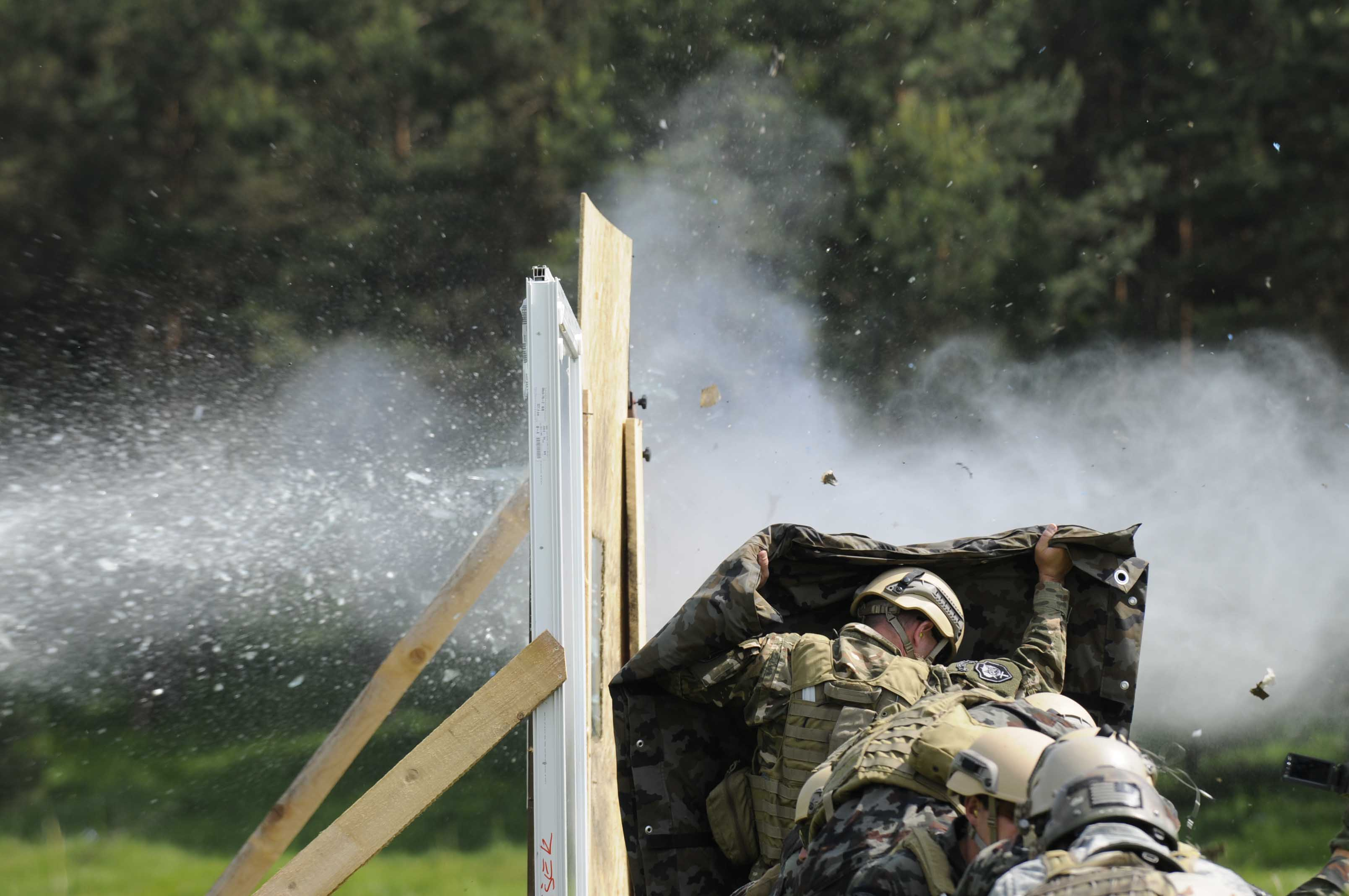
Slovenian and 5th Battalion, 19th Special Forces Group soldiers practice explosive breaching techniques during a three-week Joint Combined Exchange Training exercise in Slovenia.

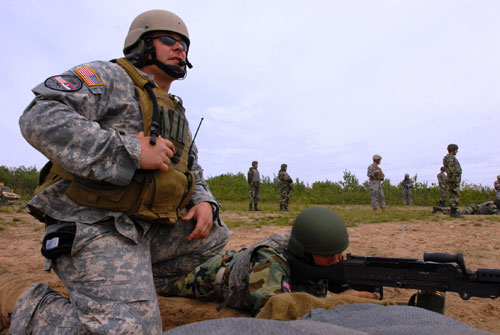
A soldier of from Company B, 2nd Battalion, 19th Special Forces Group instructs a Serbian soldier on the M240B

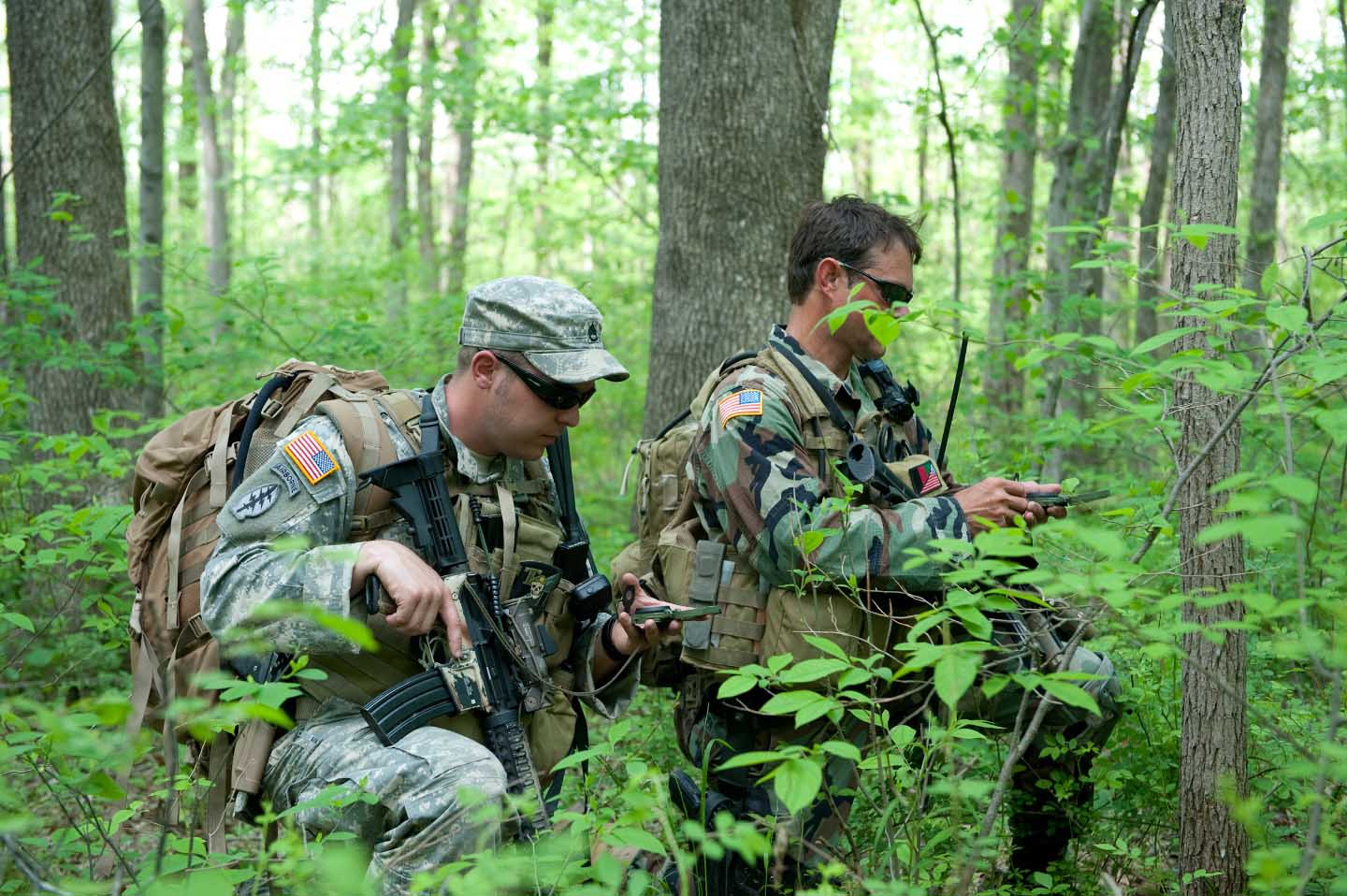
Soldiers with 2nd Battalion, 19th Special Forces Group check their course with compasses during a foot patrol while training at Camp Atterbury Joint Maneuver Training Center, Indiana

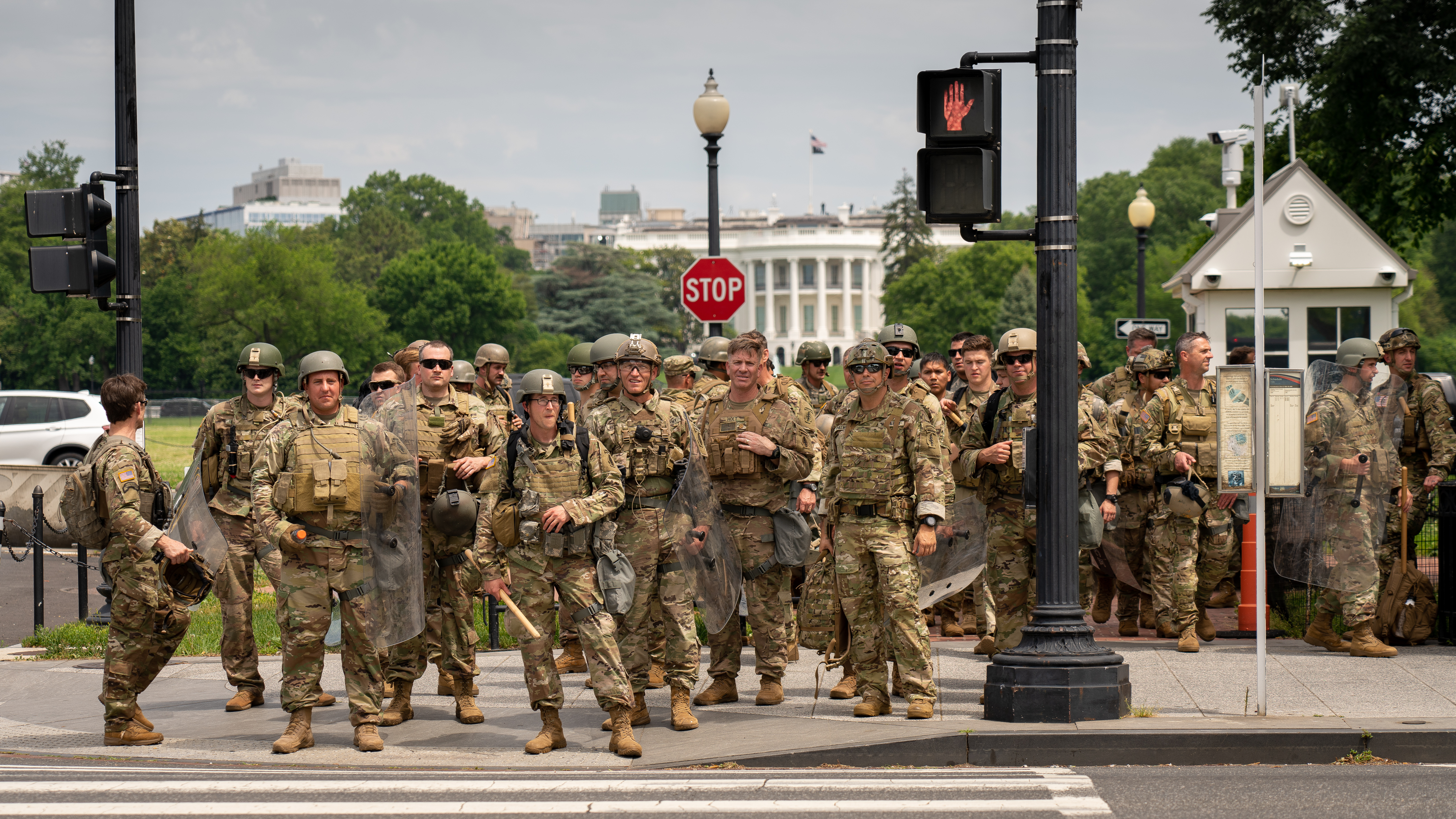
Utah National Guardsmen from the 19th SFG on riot control duty in front of the White House on June 3, 2020
