= List of military installations in Utah =

== Current installations ==
- Camp Williams - National Guard training site operated by the Utah National Guard.
  - US Army Reserve Center at Camp Williams
- Dugway Proving Ground - Allied biological and chemical weapon defense systems testing.
  - Michael Army Airfield - Airport at Dugway Proving Ground.
- Hill Air Force Base - A major U.S. Air Force Base.
  - Ogden Air Logistics Complex - Provides support and maintenance for weapon systems at Hill Air Force Base.
- Roland R. Wright Air National Guard Base - Utah Air National Guard base located on the east side of the Salt Lake City International Airport.
- Tooele Army Depot - A U.S. Army war reserve and training ammunition storage facility.
- Utah Test and Training Range - Military testing and training area.
- Utah National Guard Army Aviation Support Facility (AASF) - A U.S. Army helicopter refueling and training facility at South Valley Regional Airport.

== Former installations ==
- Black Mesa Test Range - Former rocket testing facility.
- Camp Floyd/Fort Crittenden
- Deseret Chemical Depot - A U.S. Army chemical weapons storage facility. Site transferred to Tooele Army Depot in 2013.
  - Tooele Chemical Agent Disposal Facility - Weapon disposal facility at Deseret Chemical Depot.
- Clearfield Naval Supply Depot
- Fort Cameron
- Fort Douglas (including the Stephen A. Douglas Armed Forces Reserve Center, which closed in 2026)
- Fort Duchesne
- Fort Thornburgh - Housed the soldiers preventing the Ute people from leaving the nearby Uintah Valley and Uncompahgre/Ouray Reservations.
- Gilson Butte - Former rocket testing facility.
- Granite Peak Installation - Former biological weapons testing facility.
- Green River Launch Complex
- Hurricane Supersonic Research Site
- Kearns Army Air base
- Ogden Defense Depot
- Ogden Arsenal - Reserve depot built 1920, combined with Hill Air Force base in 1955.
- Wendover Air Force Base

== See also ==
- Utah World War II Army Airfields
- Utah National Guard
  - Utah Army National Guard
  - Utah Air National Guard
- Utah State Defense Force
