= Christian and Sarah Knudsen House =

Historic house in Utah, United States

- U.S. National Register of Historic Places
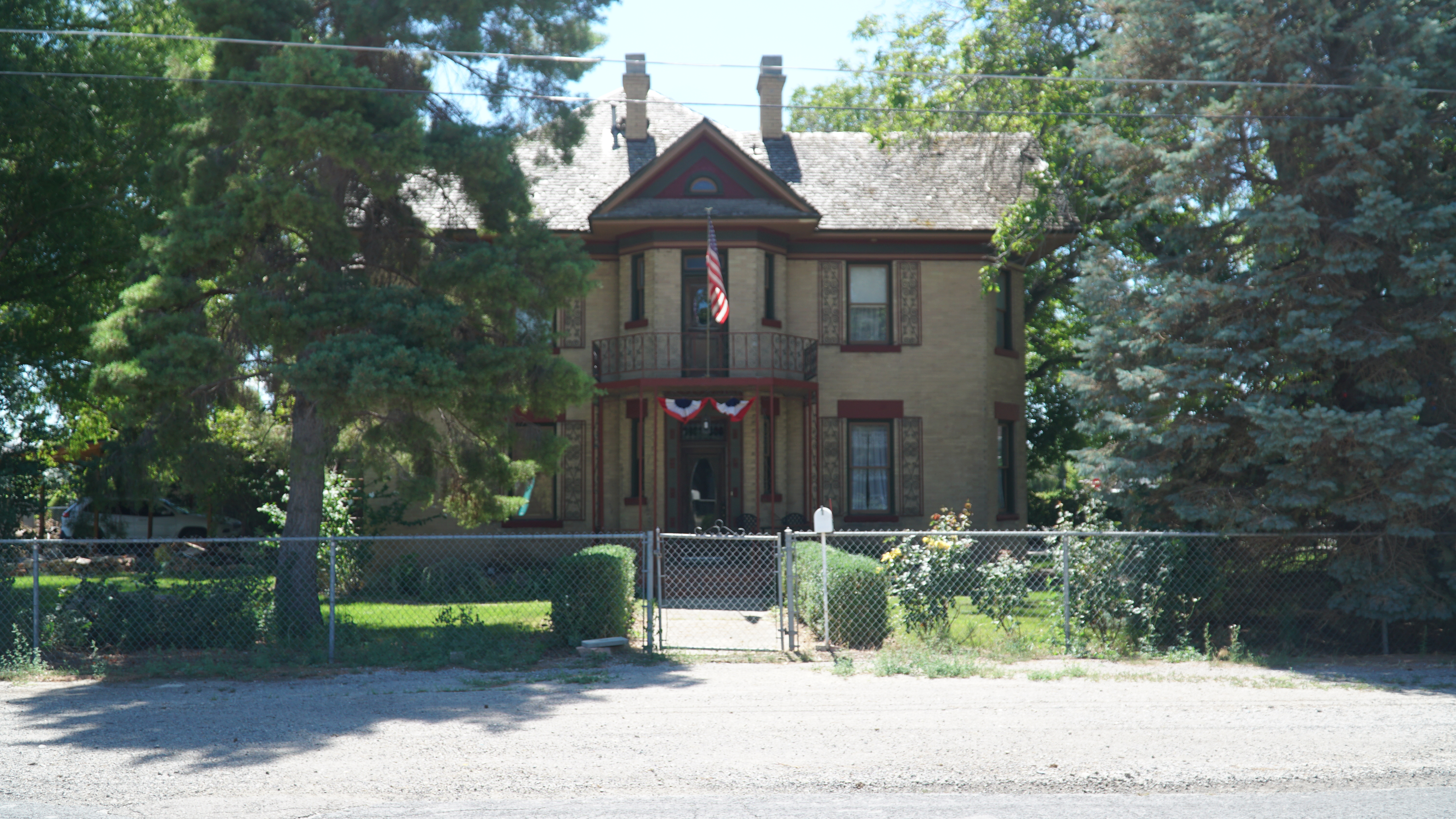

- Location within Utah Location within the United States
- Location: 123 S. Center St., Lehi, Utah
- Coordinates: 40°23′14″N 111°50′43″W
- Area: 0.3 acres (0.12 ha)
- Built: 1909
- Architectural style: Late Victorian, Classical Revival
- MPS: Lehi, Utah MPS
- NRHP reference No.: 98001458
- Added to NRHP: December 4, 1998

The Christian and Sarah Knudsen House, at 123 S. Center St. in Lehi, Utah, was built in 1909. It is a substantial house whose architecture includes Late Victorian and Classical Revival elements. It is significant as a well-preserved artifact from the boom period in Lehi's development.

The house was built by/for Christian Knudsen, a successful stockman who was prominent in his industry and also known in the town for his philanthropy and for his service in the Church of Jesus Christ of Latter-day Saints. While Knudsen and others made money from cattle, other wealth in Lehi derived from the Utah Sugar Company Factory based there; both industries benefited from the railroad which had first connected Lehi in 1872—the same year that Christian Knudsen, 15 years old, arrived with his family from Norway. The wealth and connection to the rest of the nation brought awareness of architectural styles, and many elaborate homes were built.

Knudsen married Sarah L. Otteson, of Spanish Fork in 1879 and they had 10 children. His Mormon church service included doing a mission that took him to Norway in 1896, and serving as head teacher in the Sunday school. According to the National Register nomination, the house was intended to stand until the Millennium. The Knudsens donated significantly to help build the Stake houses (Mormon administration offices) in Alpine, Lehi, and Provo.

The house is also of interest for serving, under the Knudsens, as a "halfway house for Scandinavian travelers on their way to and from Salt Lake City."

Much later, during World War II, the house served as a relocation center for four "Japanese" families. (Note that the Topaz War Relocation Center, one of 10 Japanese-American internment camps was located in rural area only about 110 miles away.) It was renovated into three apartments to help address Lehi's wartime housing shortage. Lehi was the location near to Camp Williams, the Geneva Steel Plant, and industry in the Salt Lake Valley.

The building was converted back to a single family house in 1964 and a restoration of the house began in 1985.

The restored home was listed on the National Register of Historic Places in 1998.
