= Hurricane Mesa =

Mesa in Washington County, Utah, United States

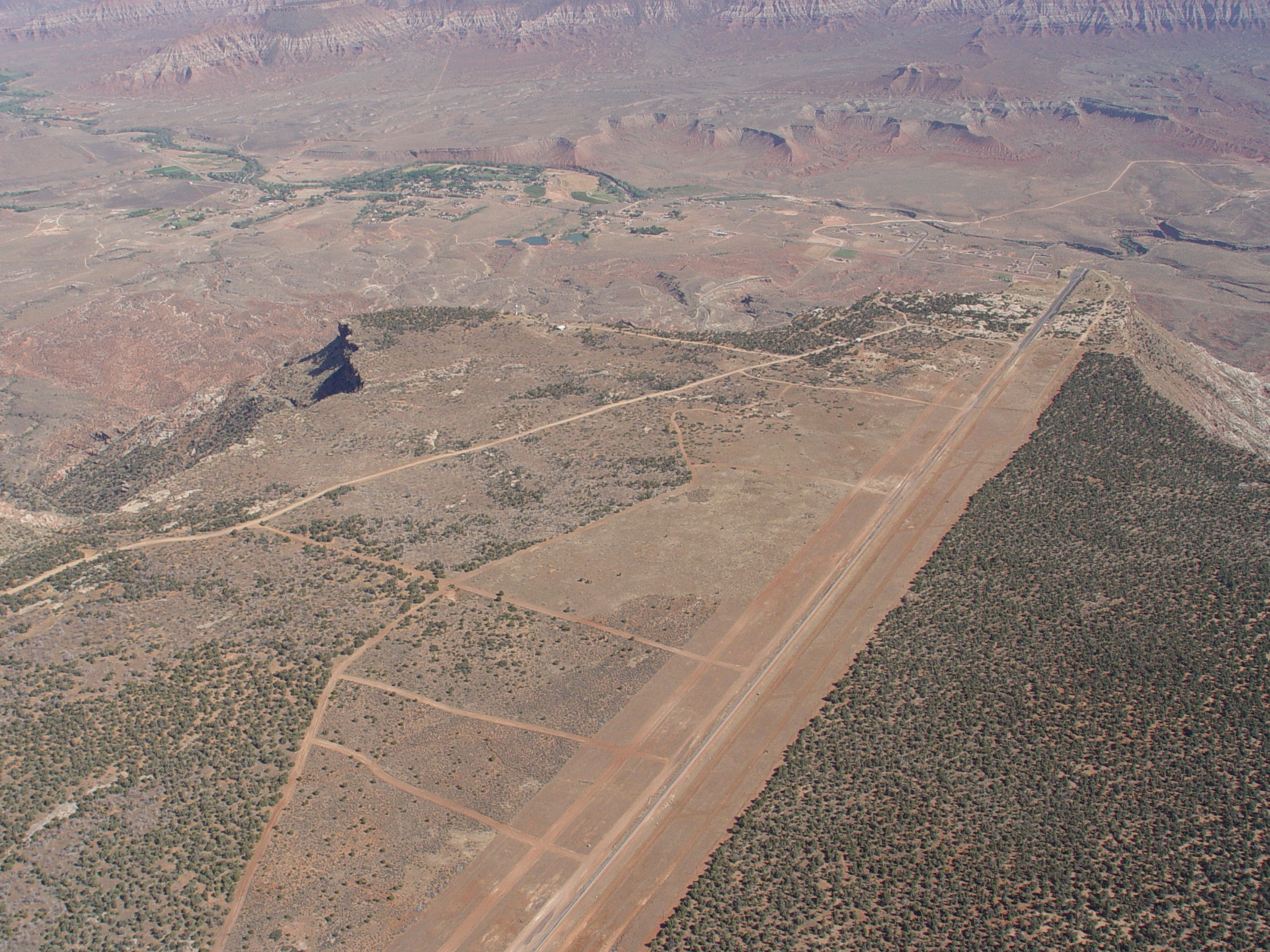
Aerial photo of part of Hurricane Mesa supersonic test track

Hurricane Mesa (37°14′25″N 113°12′41″W) is a Utah landform near Hurricane, Utah, used for Cold War tests of rocket ejection seats for supersonic aircraft at the Hurricane Supersonic Research Site. The mesa is "flat bedrock of faultless Shinarump conglomerate" 1,500 ft (460 m) above the Virgin River valley, which allowed clearance for assessment of a longer flight trajectory up from the mesa and over the cliff for the test object (e.g., the anthropoid simulator—dummy—named "Hurricane Sam").

Currently the facility is still used to test military ejection seats for the US and Foreign Govt's.
