= Machine Gun Fire =

2010 wildfire in Herriman, Utah

- Date: September 19, 2010 – September 26, 2010-->
- Location: Herriman, Utah, US
- Coordinates: 40°25′41″N 112°4′56″W

Statistics
- Burned area: 4,351 acres (18 km^{2})

Ignition
- Cause: National Guard target practice
- Motive: Accidental

Map
- Location of fire within Utah.

The Machine Gun Fire or Camp Williams Fire was a 2010 wildfire in Herriman, Utah, United States. It was started by a mistake at a firing range by National Guard troops on a training exercise. 4,351 acres burned, approximately 1600 homes were evacuated, and three homes were destroyed.

== Origin ==
Live fire 50 caliber machine gun training had been scheduled at Camp Williams for the afternoon of Sunday, 19 September 2010. As is common in the area during the late summer, the east winds off of the Wasatch Mountains picked up in the afternoon. On the previous Thursday afternoon, the National Weather Service issued a Fire Weather Watch for Saturday and Sunday. On Friday afternoon, it upgraded the alert to a Red Flag Warning for the entire weekend. Despite the dry conditions and base protocols that interdicted live-fire training during Red Flag conditions, a unit of the Utah National Guard commenced the live-fire exercise, although no highly flammable tracer rounds were used. Shrapnel ignited the brush. The Utah National Guard admitted full responsibility.

== Suppression ==
After the fire was noted on the Camp Williams Machine Gun Firing Range, on Sunday afternoon, fire crews from the camp with the assistance of two Black Hawk helicopters attempted unsuccessfully to put out the blaze, and the fire, whipped by dry winds, burned northwestward across Oak Springs Hollow. Camp Williams firefighters notified the Utah Unified Fire Authority who mobilized local fire agencies. However the fire crossed Shep's Ridge, and continued on to burn some houses on the edge of Herriman. The fire had burned over 4,351 acres and was fully contained by 24 September 2010.

The Federal Emergency Management Agency (FEMA) authorized the use of federal funds in paying the costs of fighting the fire. FEMA approved the Fire Management Assistance Grant under a statute which provides reimbursement of up to 75 percent of the state's qualifying fire fighting costs.

Evacuations continued into Tuesday September 21, 2010, although the number of homes under evacuation orders lessened to 450. The same day, it was announced that the fire was 50 percent contained. Several residents were allowed back to their homes.

== Aftermath ==
Although the National Guard quickly set up a claims center for residents whose homes or property were damaged, More than a year later many of the claims had not been addressed, and compensation was generally regarded as insufficient. This generated law suits against the Army and the National Guard. Subsequent suits included those by insurance companies, and claims by the county for fire suppression costs.

As late as 2014 landowners sued the Army over damages to their property including emotional distress, based in part on the inadequacies of federal relief.

In 2020 a detailed analysis of the fire was published. The fire was selected because of "its large size and destructive nature in relation to the wildland urban-interface area".
