= Camp Williams Hostess House/Officers' Club =

Historic house in Utah, United States

- U.S. National Register of Historic Places
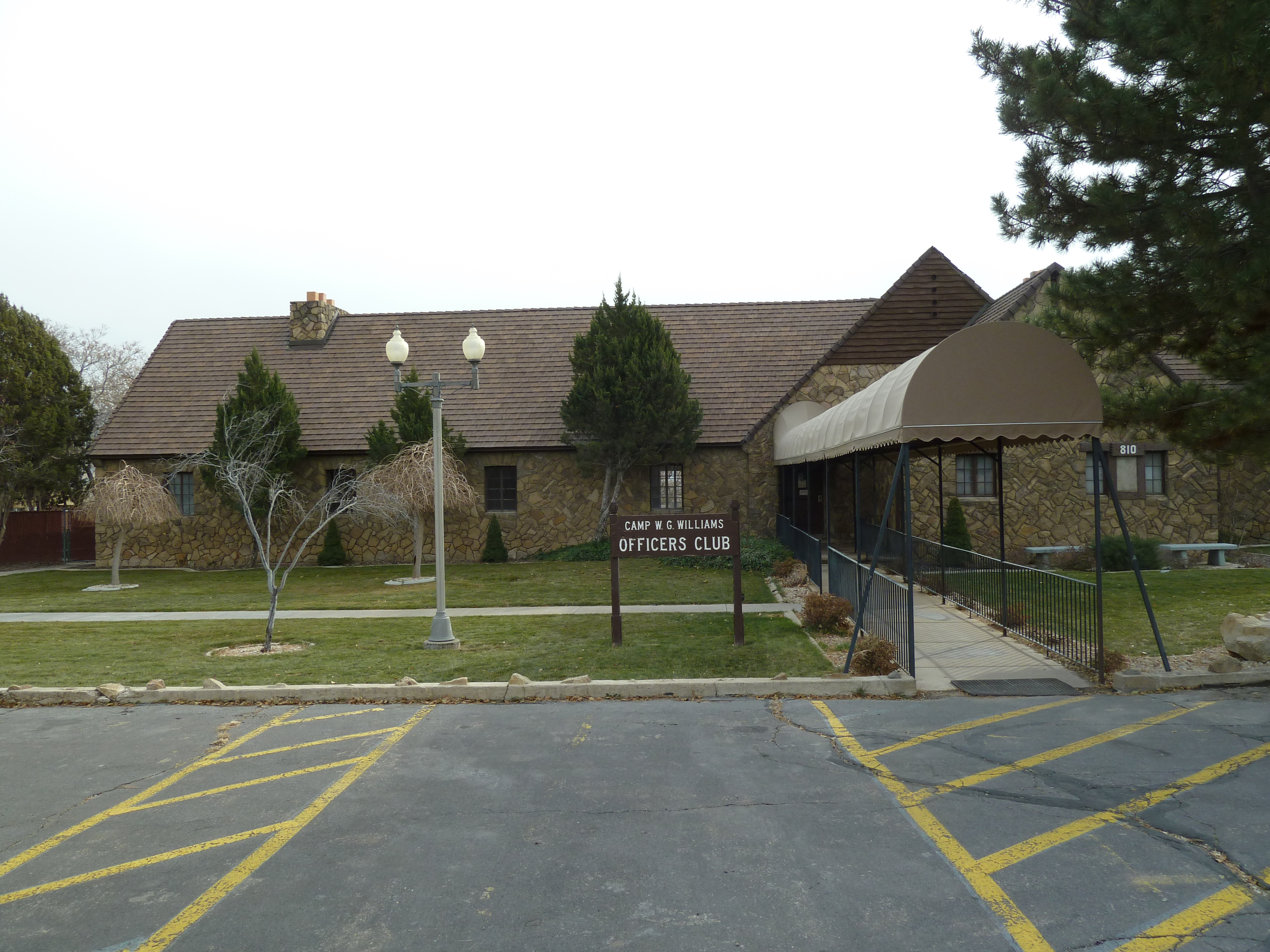
- Officers' Club, November 2014

- Location within Utah Location within the United States
- Location: Building 8100, Officer Street and Utah Ave., Camp W. G. Williams, Utah
- Coordinates: 40°26′3″N 111°55′19″W
- Area: less than one acre
- Built: 1934
- Architect: Edward O. Anderson
- Architectural style: English Tudor-Period Revival
- MPS: Public Works Buildings TR
- NRHP reference No.: 85000816
- Added to NRHP: April 1, 1985

The Camp Williams Hostess House/Officers' Club is a historic building located on Camp W. G. Williams in Bluffdale, Utah County, Utah, United States. It is listed on the National Register of Historic Places (NRHP).

== Description and History ==
Originally known as "The Hostess House," this building was constructed in 1934 as part of a Public Works Administration project, exemplifying the English Tudor-Period Revival architectural style. Designed by Edward O. Anderson, the structure features 327 tons of stone quarried directly from the Camp Williams Military Reservation. Its construction reflected the economic recovery efforts of the Great Depression and highlighted the role of New Deal programs in Utah.

The Officers' Club served as a social hub for the families of soldiers stationed at Camp Williams. It provided a space for events, gatherings, and morale-building activities, fostering a sense of community during the mid-20th century.

In recognition of its historical significance, the building was added to the National Register of Historic Places on April 1, 1985.

== Current Use ==
Now managed by the Utah National Guard's Morale, Welfare, and Recreation (MWR) program, the Officers' Club remains a central venue for both official and community events. The venue is available for rent under specific guidelines, with capacity limits for its Great Hall (120 seated), Sunroom (88 standing), and outdoor spaces (300 people).

=== Rental Guidelines ===
The Officers' Club may be rented by:

- Current, retired, or veteran members of U.S. military service.
- Utah National Guard employees or State of Utah employees with valid identification (e.g., CAC card, VA card, or DD-214).

All events must comply with specific guidelines:

- Alcohol can only be served by MWR-approved bartenders.
- Open flames, such as candles, are prohibited.
- Renters are responsible for setup, takedown, and cleaning unless a $250 cleaning fee is paid.

In the event of an elevated threat condition at Camp Williams, guests may face access restrictions, and full refunds will be provided if events must be canceled.

== See also ==
- National Register of Historic Places listings in Utah County, Utah
