= Granite Peak Installation =

Coordinates: 40°10′14.6″N 113°17′45.9″W

The Granite Peak Installation (GPI) — also known as Granite Peak Range — was a U.S. biological weapons testing facility located on 250 square miles (650 km^{2}) of Dugway Proving Ground in Utah. The GPI was a sub-installation of Dugway but had its own facilities, including utilities. Established in 1943, GPI was deactivated with the end of World War II.

== History ==
In October 1943, because of the limitations of a 2,000-acre (8.1 km^{2}) site at Horn Island off the coast of Mississippi a biological weapons testing site was established at Dugway Proving Ground in Utah. Known as the Granite Peak Installation, the site was activated as the U.S. military's principal bio-weapons testing site beginning in June 1944. Construction on the massive facilities required by GPI began on July 10, 1944, and continued for seven months, finally ending on January 30, 1945. The total cost for the development and construction of GPI was around $1.3 million (equivalent to $23 million in 2025). When World War II ended in 1945 GPI was deactivated and closed.

== Mission ==
=== Overview ===
GPI was the U.S. bio-weapons program's main testing site. Granite Peak was a sub-installation of Dugway Proving Ground and many of GPI's administrative task were overseen by the post commander at Dugway. Personnel stationed at the main Dugway grounds cooperated with tests at GPI. For example, air missions were flown by Dugway detachments, and weather forecast data was also provided by personnel at Dugway. Despite the assistance from Dugway, GPI maintained control over all technical aspects of its operations and testing. GPI was overseen by the Special Projects Division, part of the U.S. Army Biological Warfare Laboratories.

=== Testing ===
One weapon tested was a 91-pound bomb containing "vegetable killer acid", known as VKA (2,4-Dichlorophenoxyacetic acid), now commonly sold as an ingredient in household "weed n' feed" products. Testing of other munitions continued from 1943–1945, including tests using Bacillus anthracis, the causative agent of Anthrax, and Brucella suis, the causitive agent of Brucellosis. The M33 cluster bomb was used in a series of tests from August–October 1952 at GPI, with the Army Chemical Corps exposing over 11,000 guinea pigs to Brucella suis. The guinea pig trials caused one Chemical Corps general to remark, "Now we know what to do if we ever go to war against guinea pigs"

== Facilities ==
GPI was a 250-square-mile (650 km^{2}) area of Dugway that was located 30 miles (48 km) west from the nearest active area, known as "Dog Area". Because of this isolation the installation developed many of its own facilities, separate from the main facilities at Dugway. GPI had its own utilities, laboratories, living quarters and medical facility. By 1985 only two surviving structures remained at GPI: a pump house and an underground "igloo storage building".

Transportation resources at GPI included an airplane landing strip and 22 miles (35 km) of surfaced roads. Utilities at the site included, sewer and septic systems, power plants, and delivery systems for electricity, water and steam. The base was much larger than the BW site at Horn Island.

== See also ==
- Fort Detrick
- Fort Terry
- Horn Island Testing Station
- Granite Peak
- Gruinard Island
- List of military installations in Utah
