= Camp Williams =

Military base south of Bluffdale, Utah

Camp W. G. Williams
- South of Riverton, Utah
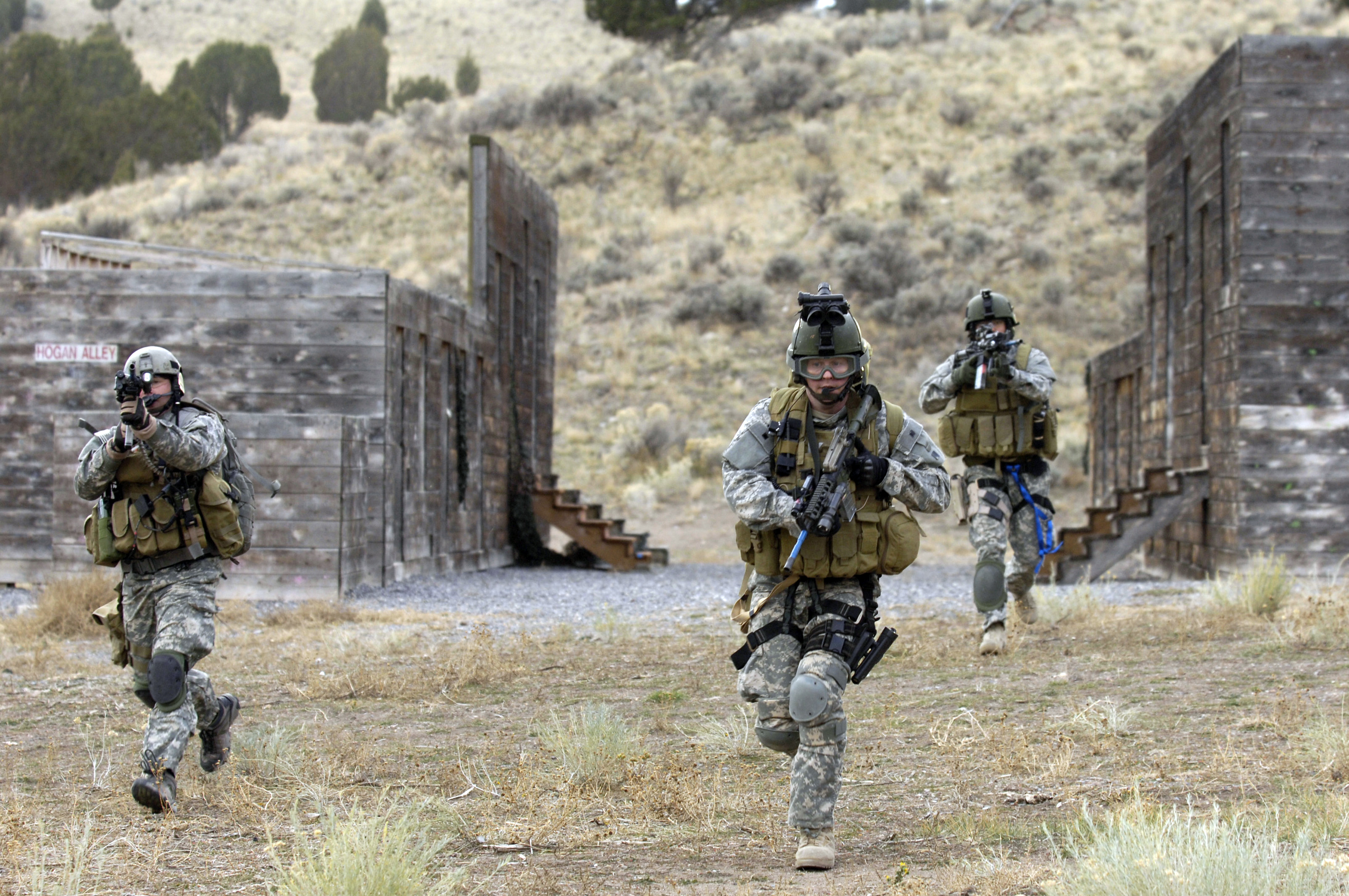
- Soldiers from the 19th Special Forces Group conduct training at Camp Williams

Site information
- Open to the public: No

Location
- Coordinates: 40.4375°N 111.9255°W

Site history
- Built: 1928

Camp W. G. Williams, commonly known as Camp Williams, also known as Army Garrison Camp Williams, is a National Guard training site operated by the Utah National Guard. It is located south of Bluffdale, west of Lehi, and north of Saratoga Springs and Cedar Fort, approximately 25 miles (40 km) south of Salt Lake City, straddling the border between Salt Lake County and Utah County in the western portion of the Traverse Mountains. Camp Williams is also home to the Non-Commissioned Officer's Basic Leader Course, which is taught to Active, National Guard, and Reserve components.

Camp Williams land comprises about 6 square miles (16 km^{2}) of flat area and 47 square miles (120 km^{2}) of mountainous region.

== History ==
The Utah Army National Guard traces its beginnings to the Utah Territorial Militia, known as the Nauvoo Legion. The Nauvoo Legion operated similarly to militias in other states and territories, including requiring adult men—between the ages of 18 and 45—to serve. The militia served as guardians of the Central Overland Route, and in the Utah War, Black Hawk War and Walker War. During this period the legion's various units had annual musters and training camps, with Lehi's unit often doing so near the site of today's Camp Williams. During a power struggle between the Federal government of the United States and the Church of Jesus Christ of Latter-day Saints, the militia was abolished in the Edmunds–Tucker Act of 1887.

By March 1894 conflicts had settled down, and the Utah Territorial Legislature authorized Caleb Walton West, the Governor, to establish The National Guard of Utah. Twenty years later, in 1914 and 1915, US president Woodrow Wilson set aside 18,700 acres to provide permanent training grounds for the guard. This was the first official designation of land that would comprise Camp Williams. This original land makes up the western majority of the current site, which is rough and rugged, and lacked flat land for a cantonment area (headquarters and camp). So the State of Utah rented nearby flatter land, and then later purchased it to build a cantonment area. Permanent use of the area, including buildings, was not established at this time, due to World War I, and the site was just occasionally used until the 1920s. In both 1926 and 1927 the guard's annual encampment was held at the site, and in 1928 the camp was officially established for permanent use as Camp W.G. Williams. It was named after Brigadier General William Grey Williams in recognition of his war participation since the Spanish–American War and his work in establishing the site as a permanent training location.

=== Machine Gun Fire ===
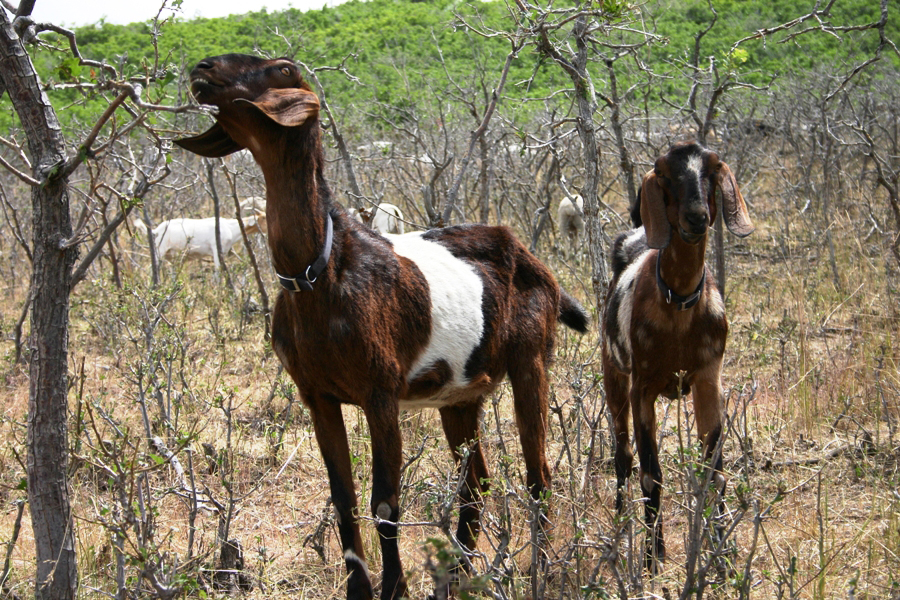
Goats being used by the Utah Army National Guard to create a firebreak at Camp Williams.

On 19 September 2010, live fire .50-caliber machine gun training at the camp sparked the "Machine Gun Fire" that resulted in over 3,500 acres burned and the loss of three homes in the city of Herriman to the north.

=== Utah Data Center ===
From 2011 to 2013, the National Security Agency (NSA) built a US$1.5 billion Community Comprehensive National Cybersecurity Initiative Data Center at Camp Williams, the first in a series of data centers required for the Comprehensive National Cybersecurity Initiative. The 1,500,000 square feet (140,000 m^{2}) facility is built on 200 acres (81 ha) where Camp Williams' former airfield was located on the west side of Utah Highway 68. It is rumored to be capable of storing 1 yottabyte of data by 2015, although this figure remains highly speculative. The facility uses 65 megawatts of electricity and cost another $2 billion for hardware, software, and maintenance.

This facility greatly increased the NSA's ability to store and process millions of emails, IMs, SMS, and phone calls made daily by people around the world.

=== U.S. Army Readiness Center ===
On August 19, 2024, a groundbreaking ceremony was held to mark construction of a U.S. Army Reserve (USAR) Reserve Center at Camp Williams. The new center will allow the 76th Operational Response Command and 807th Medical Command to relocate their headquarters from the Stephen A. Douglas Armed Forces Reserve Center at Fort Douglas to Camp Williams. The new reserve center is expected to be completed in 2026, after which the historic reserve property in Salt Lake City will be given to the University of Utah for development.

== See also ==
- List of military installations in Utah
- Camp Williams Hostess House/Officers' Club, listed on the National Register of Historic Places
