= Hurricane Supersonic Research Site =

US Air Force test site near St George, Utah

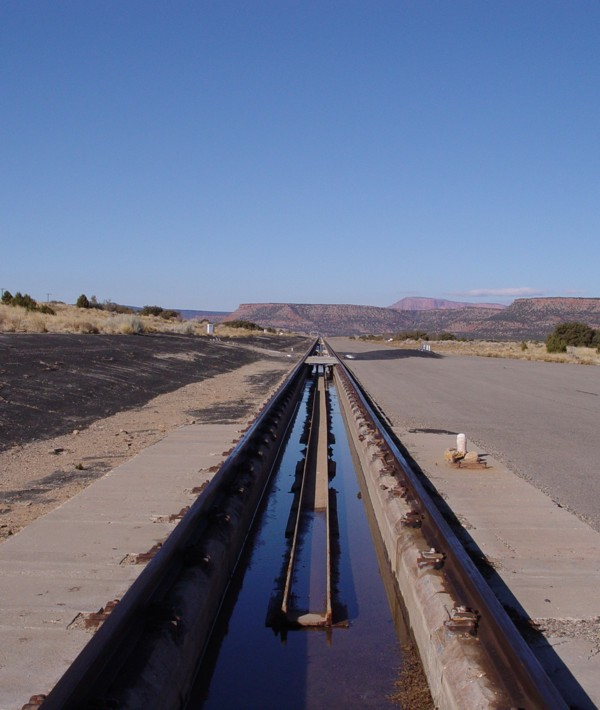
Looking north along the test track

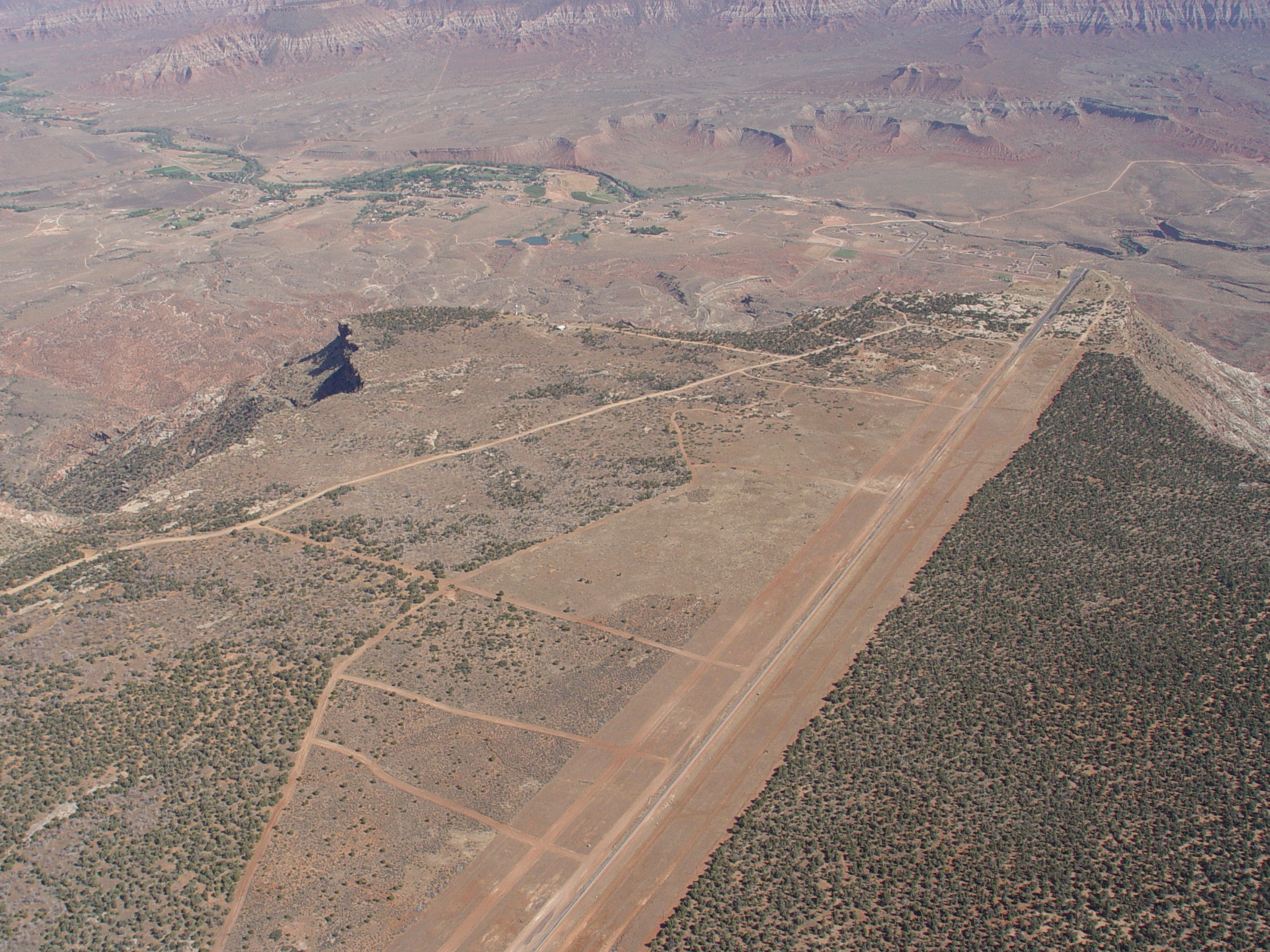
Aerial photo of part of the supersonic test track on Hurricane Mesa

The Hurricane Supersonic Research Site (HSRS) was formerly on Hurricane Mesa in Washington County, Utah. It was a United States Air Force (USAF) launch complex with a rocket research track that launched a rocket ejection seat from a supersonic sled.

The track's 12,000 ft (3,700 m) "of continuously welded, heavy-duty crane-rails aligned to within plus or minus one-tenth inch tolerance [was] the longest" in the US (cf. the shorter 1954 Holloman Rocket Sled). Coleman Engineering Company was contracted for $2 million in June 1954 and constructed the Supersonic Military Air Research Track (SMART), mechanical arresting gear (water brakes with 34 tons of force), retro rockets, and photographic/telemetering facilities. Coleman was also contracted for operations on November 30, 1955, and achieved a "world land speed record [using] a 9,400-pound sled rocketing down the track at 1,800 miles per hour." The numerous test facilities included a powered comparator for high-speed motion pictures, a 1956 IBM 706 computer, and 1960 Bendix G-15 computer. Control of the site transferred from Indian Springs Air Force Base on November 6, 1957, and from Wright-Patterson AFB to Edwards AFB on March 9, 1962—the base was placed on standby in December 1961, and was closed on June 20, 1963.

The 3,500.78-acre (1,416.72 ha) Formerly Used Defense Site (J08UT0026) initially transferred to Stanley Aviation and was leased to Sacol, Inc. on May 21, 1965.

Adjacent to the test track, in an abandoned, out-of-service airstrip, which was called the Hurricane Mesa Airport.(37°14′59″N 113°12′31″W)

Now called the Hurricane Mesa Test Facility it is owned and managed by the Collins Aerospace division of the Raytheon Technologies Corporation. Currently the facility is still used to test military ejection seats for the U.S. and foreign governments.
