= Fort Douglas =

- U.S. National Register of Historic Places
- U.S. National Historic Landmark District
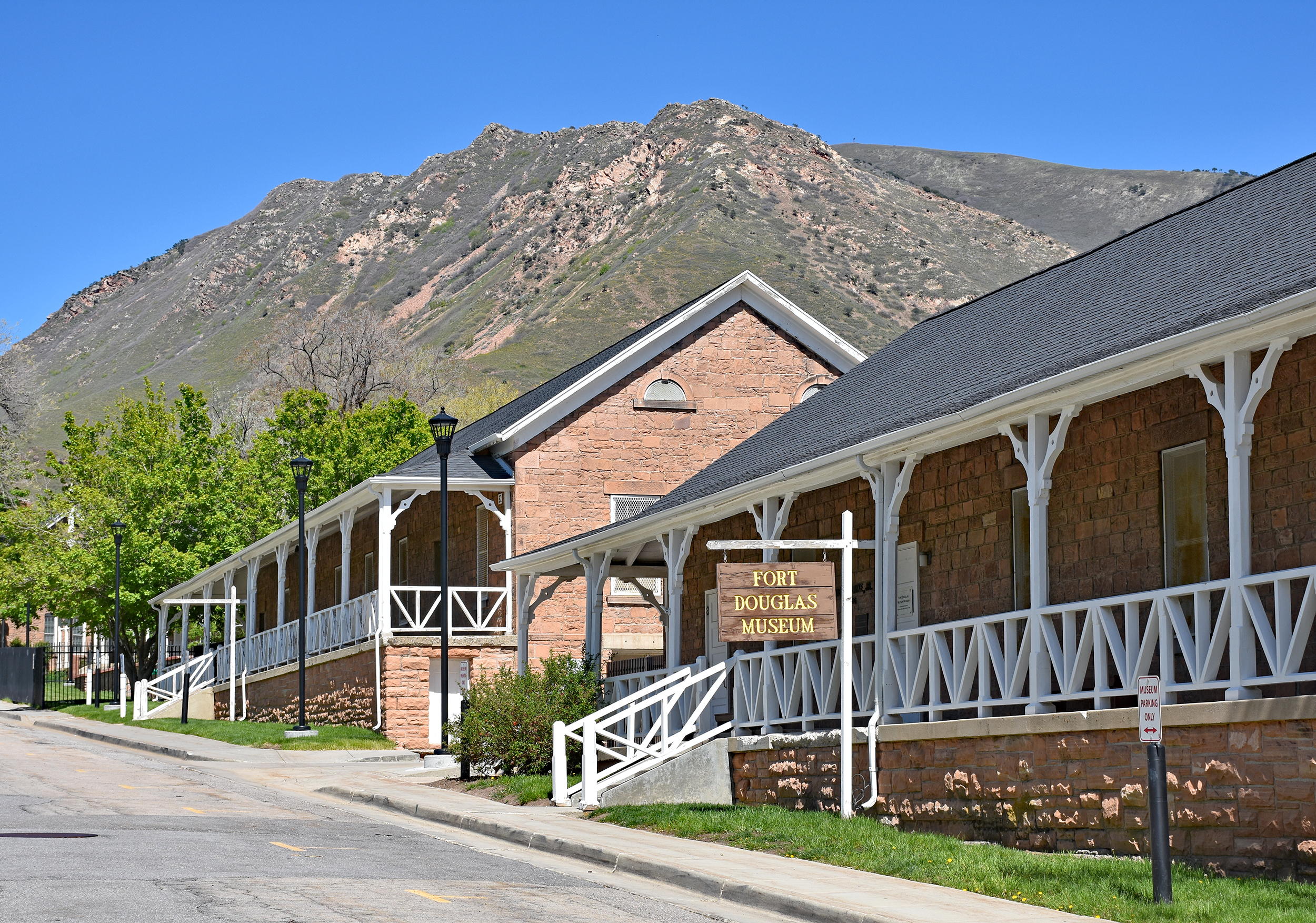
- Fort Douglas Military Museum, May 2022

- Location within Utah Location within the United States
- Location: Salt Lake City, Utah
- Coordinates: 40°45′55″N 111°49′59″W
- Area: 25 acres (10 ha) (landmarked area)
- Built: 1862
- NRHP reference No.: 70000628

Significant dates
- Added to NRHP: June 15, 1970
- Designated NHLD: May 15, 1975

Fort Douglas (initially called Camp Douglas) was established in October 1862, during the American Civil War, as a small military garrison about three miles east of Salt Lake City, Utah. Its purpose was to protect the overland mail route and telegraph lines along the Central Overland Route. Over time, it grew into a significant military base in the region, until it was officially closed in 1991 pursuant to BRAC action. Following the closure, a small section of the former fort was retained by the military and operated as the Stephen A. Douglas Armed Forces Reserve Center, until 2026.

At one time, the post included 10,525 acres (4,259 ha). Most of the fort's former property has been turned over to the University of Utah and many of its buildings are preserved and used by the university for a variety of purposes. The Utah Military Museum at Historic Fort Douglas is housed in two former barracks buildings. The site was designated a National Historic Landmark in 1975, for its role in the Civil War and in furthering the settlement of Utah.

== History ==
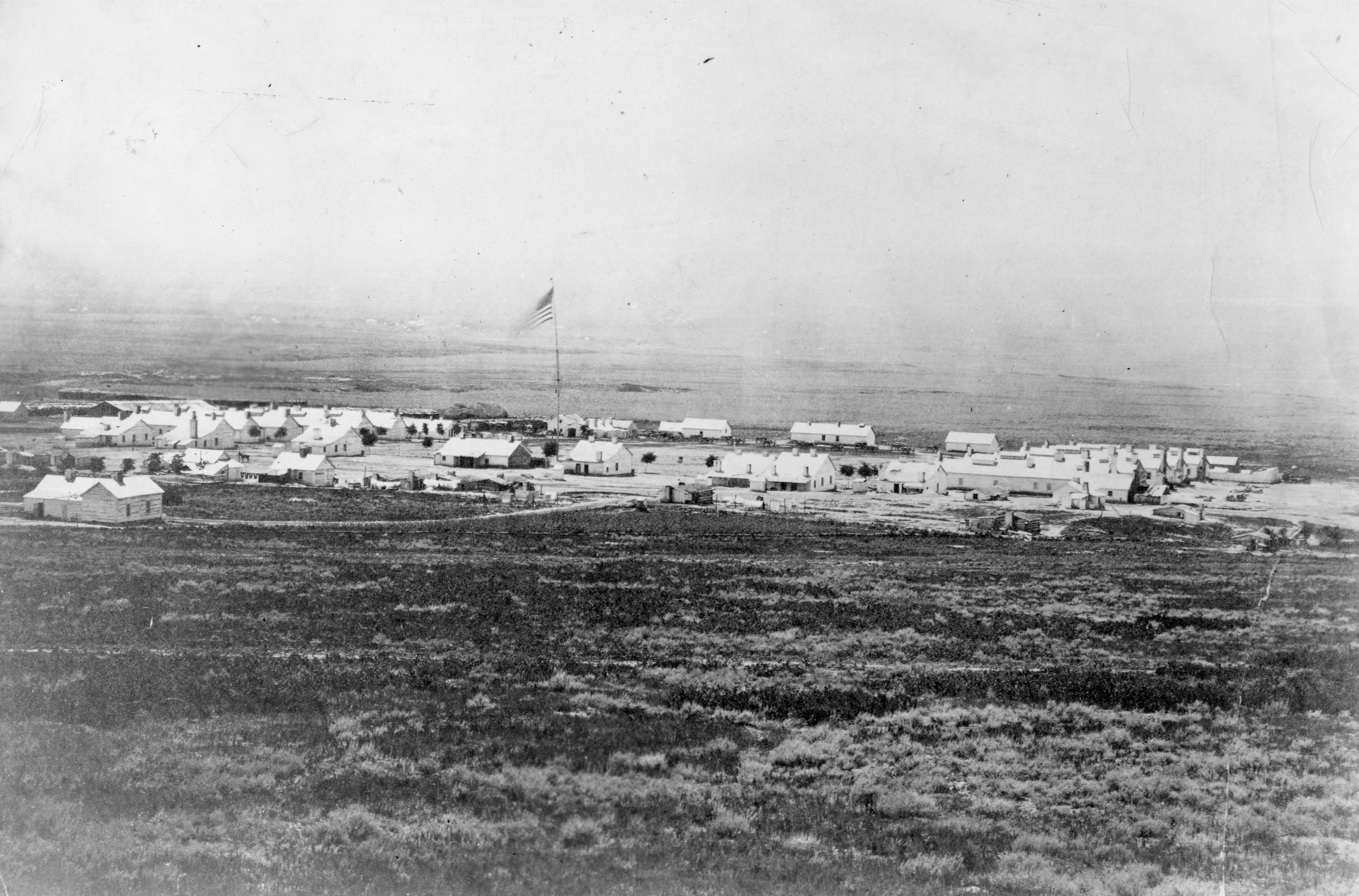
Camp Douglas, Utah Territory, 1866

=== Establishment ===
Early in the Civil War, the threat of violence increased with the withdrawal of Federal troops from the West for use against the Confederate States of America. Colonel Patrick Connor was ordered to reestablish a military presence with volunteer soldiers in the Utah Territory. He selected a site east of Salt Lake City, and Camp Douglas, named after Senator Stephen A. Douglas, was officially established there on October 26, 1862. Connor's men were Union volunteers from both California and Nevada. The post served as headquarters for the District of Utah in the Department of the Pacific.

=== Regular Army arrives, 1866–1874 ===
Following the end of the Civil War, between 1866 and 1898, the fort was part of the Department of the Platte. Its importance increased when the Union Pacific and Central Pacific railroads joined rails at Promontory Summit, Utah, on May 10, 1869, completing the Transcontinental Railroad.

=== 1878–1902 ===
Through the efforts of Utah's U.S. Sen. Thomas Kearns, the camp became a regimental post and was renamed "Fort Douglas."

=== World War I ===
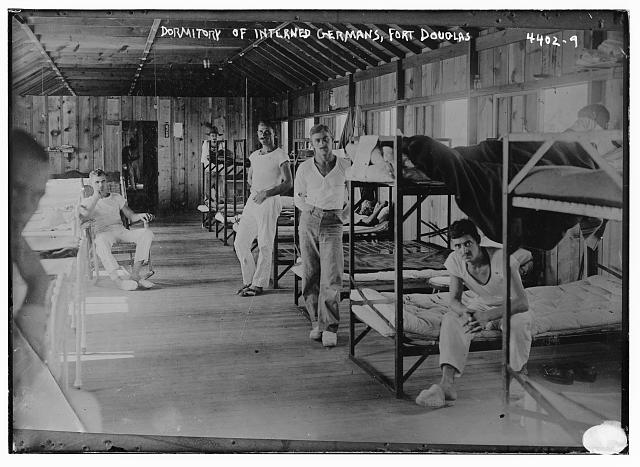
Several Germans in the internment camp at Fort Douglas during World War I

During World War I, the fort was used as a camp during German American internment, and as a camp for Imperial German Navy POWs. One of the crews kept there was from the SMS Cormoran, which had left the German colony of Qingdao, China, at the beginning of the war and stopped at Guam in December 1914 to refuel and take on provisions. Denied the coal needed for their boilers, the German captain reluctantly submitted to detention. When the United States entered the war on the Allied side in 1917, the crew were made prisoners of war and were sent to Fort Douglas.

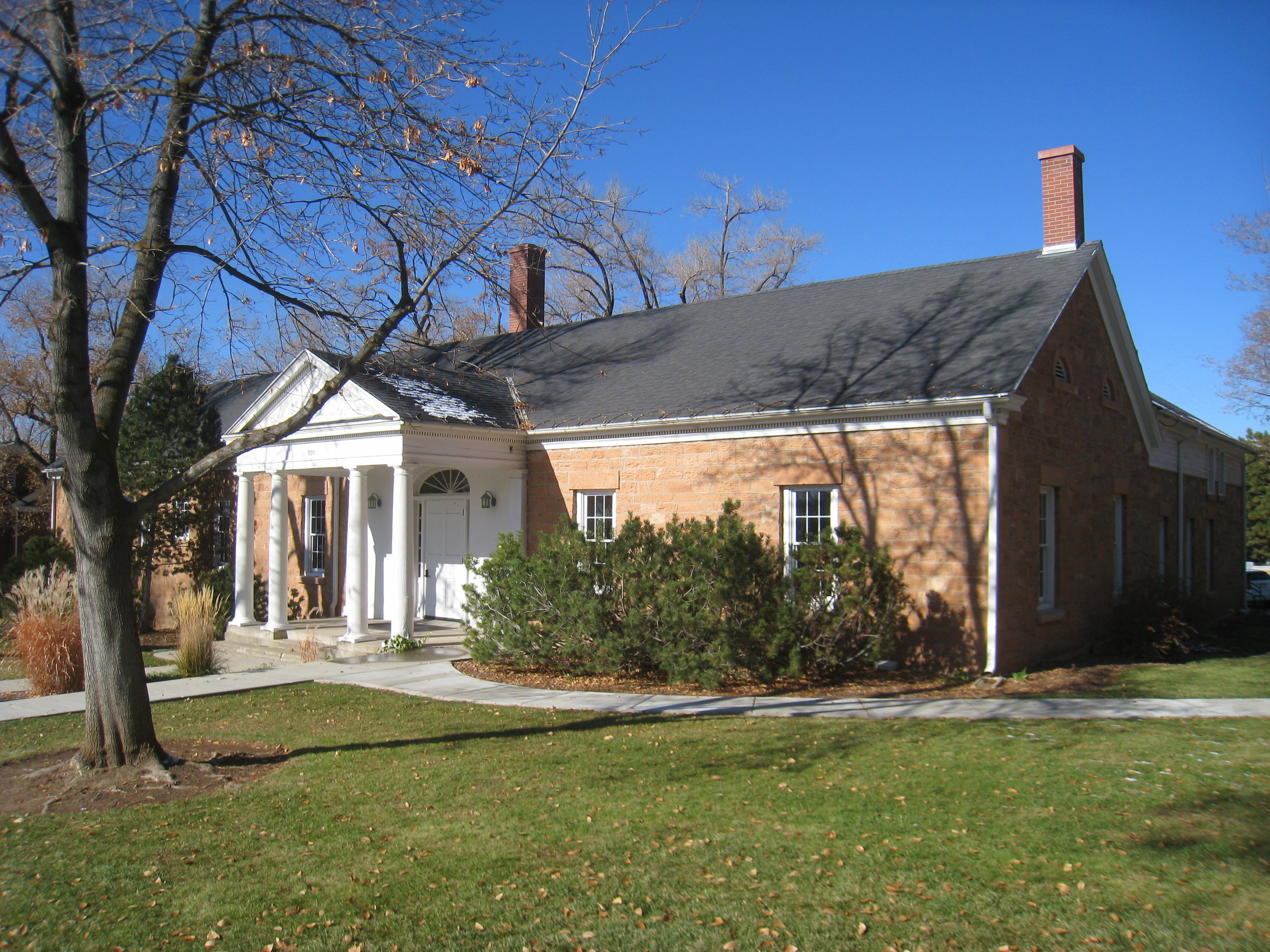
Commander's House. Built in 1875 as barracks, remodeled for the commanding officer in 1929.

=== Interwar period ===
In 1922, the fort became the base of the 38th Infantry, which remained there until August 1940.

=== World War II ===
Following Japan's attack on Pearl Harbor, Fort Douglas became an Army Air Field in conjunction with Salt Lake City Municipal Airport and housed the 7th Bombardment Group operating B-17 Flying Fortresses. However, Fort Douglas proper was taken over by the Army ground forces when fears of a Japanese attack of the U.S. mainland caused the Ninth Service Command Headquarters to move from Utah to the Presidio of San Francisco.

=== Final years, 1945–1991 ===
After World War II, the Army began disposing of its land, transferring it to the University of Utah, located adjacent to it. However, it maintained Army Reserve functions there for decades, notably with the 96th Army Reserve Command under the command of Maj. Gen. Michael B. Kauffman, who had spent much of his Army career at the fort and was instrumental in keeping it alive well past its announced closing in the 1970s. The Fort Douglas Military Museum is housed in a building named after Maj. Gen. Kauffman, who founded the museum and built it into one of the United States' premier military museums featuring exhibits from all branches of the Armed Services.

Between 1962 and 1973, Fort Douglas was the site of the Deseret Test Center (Buildings 103 and 105) with the responsibility of evaluating chemical and biological weapons, although no tests were actually performed on the base.

On October 26, 1991, the fort closed officially, though the Utah National Guard maintained control of the museum, and the 96th Army Reserve Command (ARCOM) received the parts of the fort that were not deeded to the university.

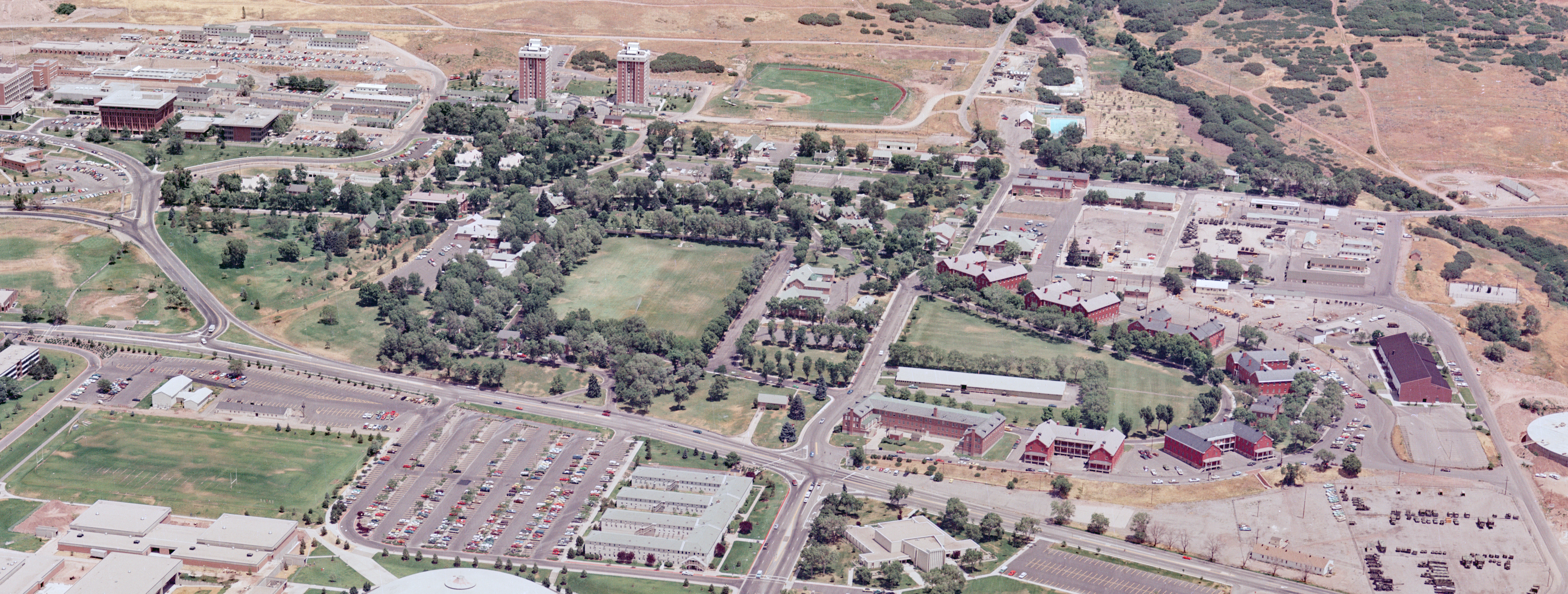
Fort Douglas, as photographed July 1978

=== Post-1991 usage ===
==== Armed Forces Reserve Center (1991–2026) ====
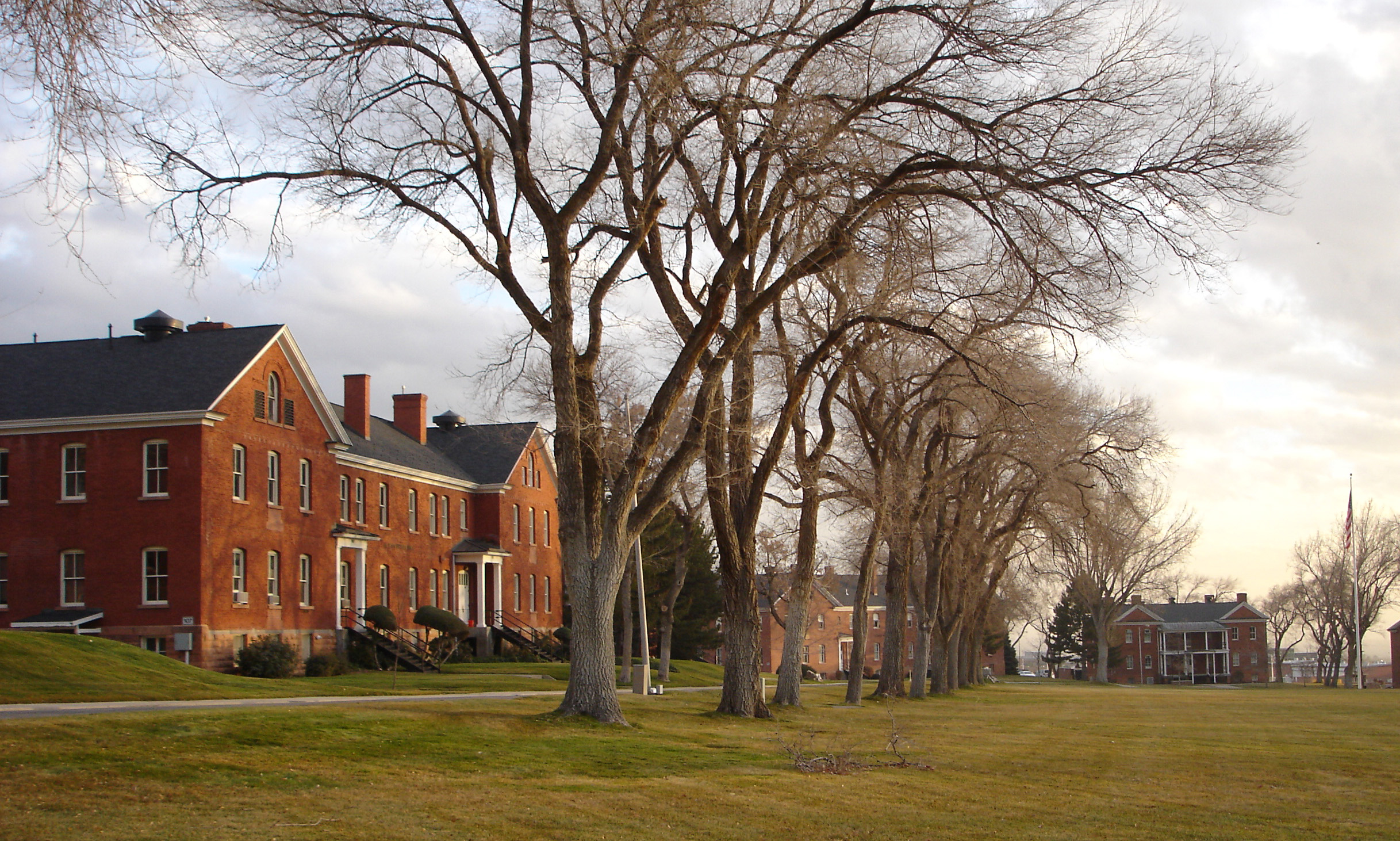
Soldier's Circle at the Reserve Center

Following the base's closure, a small portion of the southwestern section of the original fort remained in use by the U.S. Army Reserve (USAR). This portion of the fort was designated the Stephen A. Douglas Armed Forces Reserve Center. The reserve center consisted of 51 acres, and included the historic Soldier's Circle, along with several sub-installation buildings. The center hosted offices, along with training and support space for 'headquarters staff for two Army Reserve commands, and staff from other Army, Navy and Marine Reserve units'.

In 2023, the Utah State Legislature allocated $100 million, via Senate Bill 2, to facilitate the relocation of the reserve center from Fort Douglas to land near the Utah National Guard’s Camp Williams in Bluffdale. The appropriated funds were to be used to acquire property, and for the design and construction of facilities at the new site. A groundbreaking ceremony for the new reserve center at Camp Williams was held in August 2024. The new center was completed in 2026, with operations moving away from the old reserve center that summer. A ceremony held on August 8, 2026, marked the closure the Stephen A. Douglas Armed Forces Reserve Center (and final piece of the historic fort) and the transfer of the remaining property to the university.

===== Commands hosted =====
In 2023, the commands hosted at the reserve center included:

- 76th Operational Response Command
- 807th Medical Command (Deployment Support)

==== University of Utah Campus (1991–Present) ====
In 1991, the University of Utah received a significant portion of the fort's remaining property from the federal government. As a condition of the land transfer, the Fort Douglas Military Museum, now known as the Utah Military Museum at Historic Fort Douglas, is to remain in two barracks buildings on campus and be operated by the Utah National Guard. During the 2002 Winter Olympics held in Salt Lake City, much of the university's campus was used to host events. The Olympic Organizing Committee and university built the Olympic Village to house participating athletes on former fort property; the village housing now serves as on-campus housing for university students. Stilwell Field is used as a parking lot during special events, such as football games. The Officers' Club building is used as a conference center by the university, and several of the officer's quarters house university departments (such as the American Indian Resource Center). Following the closure of the Douglas Reserve Center, the university was given the last remaining 51 acres (21 ha) of former fort land in October 2026.

There has been some controversy surrounding the university's stewardship of the historic fort property. In 2015, it was revealed that during construction work to upgrade the university's electrical system, buried period artifacts had been removed and discarded at a landfill.

== Cemetery ==
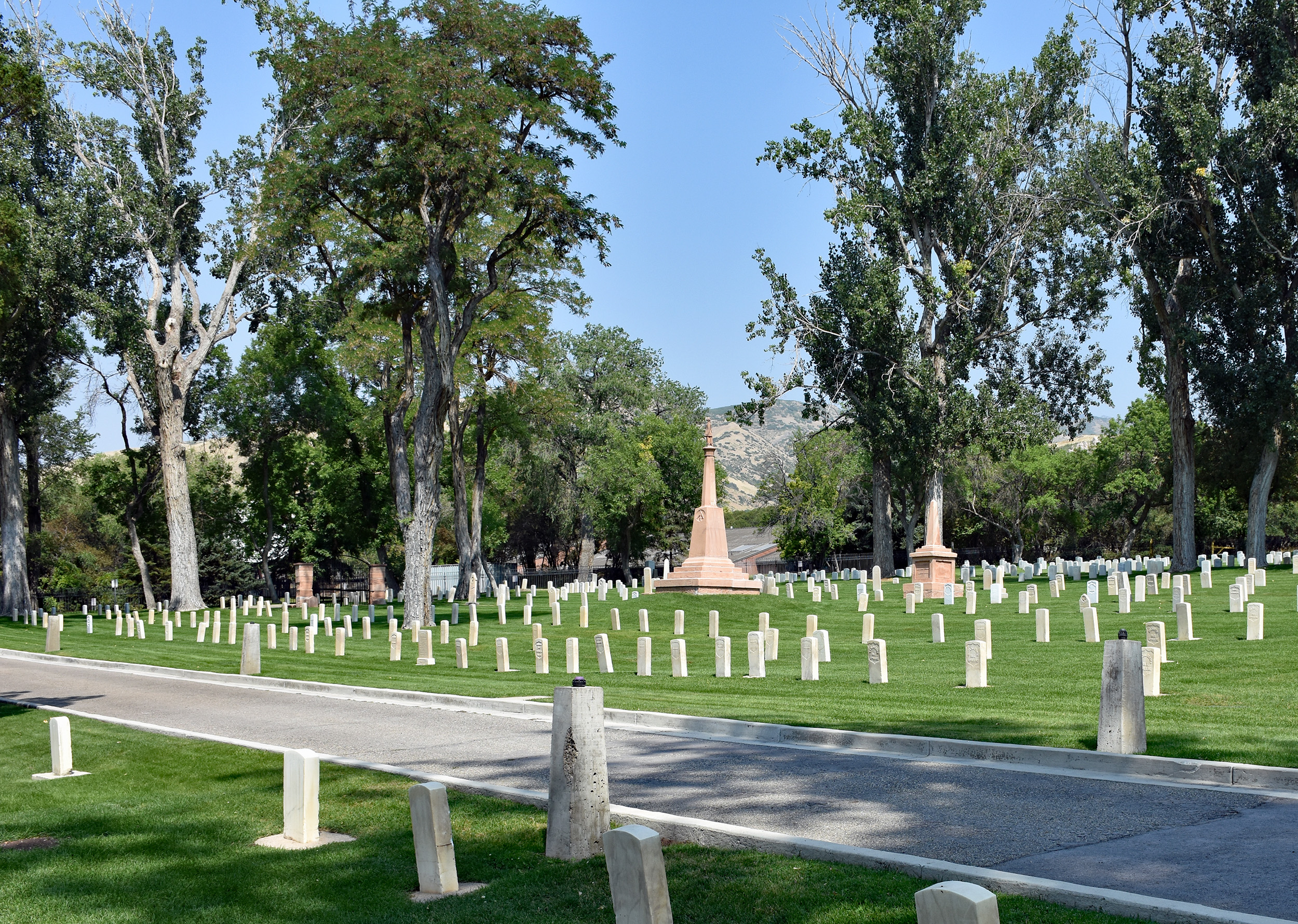
Fort Douglas Post Cemetery

A cemetery was established in 1862 about a mile south of the original parade grounds. In 1864, the soldiers at the post improved the cemetery significantly. They erected a monument in the center dedicated to the memory of the soldiers killed during the Bear River Massacre. They also constructed a red sandstone wall around the cemetery, with a steel gate located at the north end. The following year, a smaller monument was added for Utah Gov. James D. Doty following his death and burial in the cemetery. Later, the cemetery was expanded to accommodate a larger number of burials, not only from the fort, but also from Fort Cameron following its closure. A special section of the cemetery was also added for the German prisoners of war who died here during World War II. Also buried at the cemetery are the victims of the 1945 Utah prisoner of war massacre in Salina.

The Fort Douglas Cemetery was transferred from the US Army to the National Cemetery Administration in 2019. The Cemetery is actively maintained, but is closed to new internments. A list of cemetery burials is available through the Utah History Research Center's cemetery database. The cemetery was damaged during the 2020 Utah windstorm, during which hurricane-force winds knocked down large trees, damaging headstones and other historic features of the cemetery.

== See also ==
- List of National Historic Landmarks in Utah
- National Register of Historic Places listings in Salt Lake City, Utah
- Camp Floyd
- List of military installations in Utah
- Statue of Patrick Edward Connor

== Sources ==
- Madsen, Brigham D. The Shoshoni Frontier and the Bear River Massacre (Salt Lake City: University of Utah Press, 1985)
- Hibbard, Charles G. Fort Douglas, Utah: A Frontier Fort (Vestige Press, 1999)
