= Billy Edwards =

Billy Edwards may refer to:

- Billy Edwards (boxer) (1844–1907), English boxer
- Billy Edwards (footballer, born 1895), Welsh footballer
- Billy Edwards (footballer, born 1952), English footballer
- Billy Edwards Jr., American college football quarterback
- Billy Edwards (rugby union)

== See also ==
- Bill Edwards (disambiguation)
- William Edwards (disambiguation)
