= William Edwards =

William Edwards may refer to:

== Arts and entertainment ==
- William Edwards (architect) (1719–1789), Welsh architect of the Pontypridd bridge in south Wales
- William Camden Edwards (1777–1855), Welsh engraver
- William Augustus Edwards (1866–1939), American architect in Atlanta
- William Albert Edwards (1888–1976), American architect in Santa Barbara, California
- William John Edwards (1898–1978), Welsh singer
- William J. Edwards (architect) (fl. 1907), American architect, designed the Washington School (Grand Forks, North Dakota)

== Military ==
- William Edwards (United States Navy officer) (c. 1790–1813), American navy officer.
- William D. Edwards (1849–1903), American soldier and Medal of Honor recipient.
- W. F. S. Edwards (William Frederick Savery Edwards, 1872–1941), British military officer and colonial administrator
- William Mordaunt Marsh Edwards (1855–1912), English army officer, awarded the Victoria Cross in the Sudan
- William J. Edwards (general), United States Army major general

== Politics and law ==
- William Edwards (17th century MP) (fl. 1645), British politician, MP for the City of Chester
- William P. Edwards (1835–1900), American lawyer, soldier, member-elect to the U.S. Congress from Georgia
- William Henry Edwards (politician) (1857–1950), Canadian manufacturer and politician
- William Edwards (Wisconsin politician) (1861–1944), American politician, Wisconsin state senator
- Don Edwards (William Donlon Edwards, 1915–2015), U.S. representative from California
- Jack Edwards (American politician) (William Jackson Edwards, 1928–2019), U.S. representative from Alabama
- William Edwards (British politician) (1938–2007), British politician, MP for Merionethshire
- William Cameron Edwards (1844–1921), Canadian businessman and parliamentarian
- William C. Edwards (Wyoming politician) (born 1934), member of the Wyoming House of Representatives
- W. Cary Edwards (William Cary Edwards, 1944–2010), American politician, Attorney General of New Jersey
- W. Stuart Edwards (1880–1944), Canadian civil servant and lawyer

== Sports ==
- William Edwards (harness racing) (1831–1898), American harness racing pioneer
- William Edwards (Kent cricketer) (1859–1947), English cricketer
- William Edwards (Cornwall cricketer) (born 1938), English cricketer
- Will Edwards (rugby union) (born 1995), English rugby union and rugby sevens player
- Big Bill Edwards (William Hanford Edwards, 1877–1943), American football player
- Bill Edwards (American football coach) (William Miller Edwards, 1905–1987), American football player and coach
- Monk Edwards (William Bennett Edwards, 1920–2009), American football player
- Bill Edwards (basketball) (William Allen Edwards, born 1971), American basketball player
- Bill Edwards (English footballer) (William H. Edwards, 1874 – after 1896)
- Billy Edwards (footballer, born 1952) (William Edwards), English footballer
- Billy Edwards (footballer, born 1895) (William Frank Edwards, 1895–1952), Welsh footballer
- Billy Edwards (rugby union) (William Victor Edwards, 1887—1917), Irish rugby union player
- Will Edwards (Australian footballer) (born 2003), Australian rules footballer

== Others ==
- William Edwards (inventor) (1770–1851), American inventor, grandson of Jonathan Edwards
- William Frédéric Edwards (1777–1842), French physiologist, of Jamaican background
- William Henry Edwards (1822–1909), American entomologist
- William Edwards (school inspector) (1851–1940), Welsh school inspector
- William F. Edwards (1906–1989), American businessman, educator and professor at Brigham Young University
- William Muir Edwards (1879–1918), professor of mathematics and civil engineering at the University of Alberta
- Willie Edwards (1932–1957), African American murdered by the Ku Klux Klan

== See also ==
- Bill Edwards (disambiguation)
- William Edwardes (disambiguation)
- William Edward (disambiguation)
