= William J. Edwards =

William J. Edwards may refer to:

- William J. Edwards (general), United States Army major general
- Jack Edwards (American politician) (1928–2019), U.S. Republican politician, represented Alabama in the U.S. House of Representatives 1965–1985
- William J. Edwards (architect), who designed Washington School (Grand Forks, North Dakota)
- William James Edwards, founder of Snow Hill Normal and Industrial Institute and author of Twenty-Five Years in the Black Belt

== See also ==
- William Edwards (disambiguation)
