= William D. Edwards =

- Born: 1849; Brooklyn, New York, United States
- Died: January 24, 1903 (aged 54); Washington, D.C.
- Burial place: United States Soldiers' and Airmen's Home National Cemetery
- Military career
- Allegiance: United States of America
- Branch: United States Army
- Service years: c. 1875–1878
- Rank: First Sergeant
- Unit: 7th U.S. Infantry
- Conflicts: Indian Wars; Nez Perce War
- Awards: Medal of Honor

William D. Edwards (1849 – January 24, 1903) was an American soldier in the U.S. Army who served with the 7th U.S. Infantry during the Indian Wars. A participant in the Nez Perce War, he was one of six men who received the Medal of Honor for bravery against Chief Joseph and the Nez Perce at the Battle of Big Hole on August 9, 1877.

== Biography ==
William D. Edwards was born in Brooklyn, New York in 1849. He later enlisted in the U.S. Army and was assigned to frontier duty with the 7th U.S. Infantry. Stationed at Fort Missoula, fought in several campaigns against Indians during the mid-1870s. He won particular distinction in the Nez Perce War and, on August 9, 1877, was cited for "bravery in action" against Chief Joseph and the Nez Perce at the Battle of Big Hole. He was among of six soldiers who received the Medal of Honor, the other men being Sergeants Patrick Rogan and Milden Wilson, Privates Wilfred Clark and Lorenzo Brown, and musician John McLennon, on December 2, 1878. Edwards died on January 24, 1903, at the age of 54. He was interred at the United States Soldiers' and Airmen's Home National Cemetery in Washington, DC.

== Medal of Honor citation ==
Rank and organization: First Sergeant, Company F, 7th U.S. Infantry. Place and date: At Big Hole, Mont., August 9, 1877. Entered service at:------. Birth: Brooklyn, N.Y. Date of issue: December 2, 1878.

Citation:

Bravery in action.

== See also ==
- List of Medal of Honor recipients for the Indian Wars
