= Patrick Rogan =

Patrick Rogan is the name of:

- Pat Rogan (1936–2015), former Australian politician
- Patrick Rogan (Medal of Honor) (1847–1912), Irish-American US Army soldier
- Patrick Rogan (Wisconsin politician) (1808–1898), American businessman and politician
