= Henrietta Edwards =

Canadian women's rights activist (1849–1931)

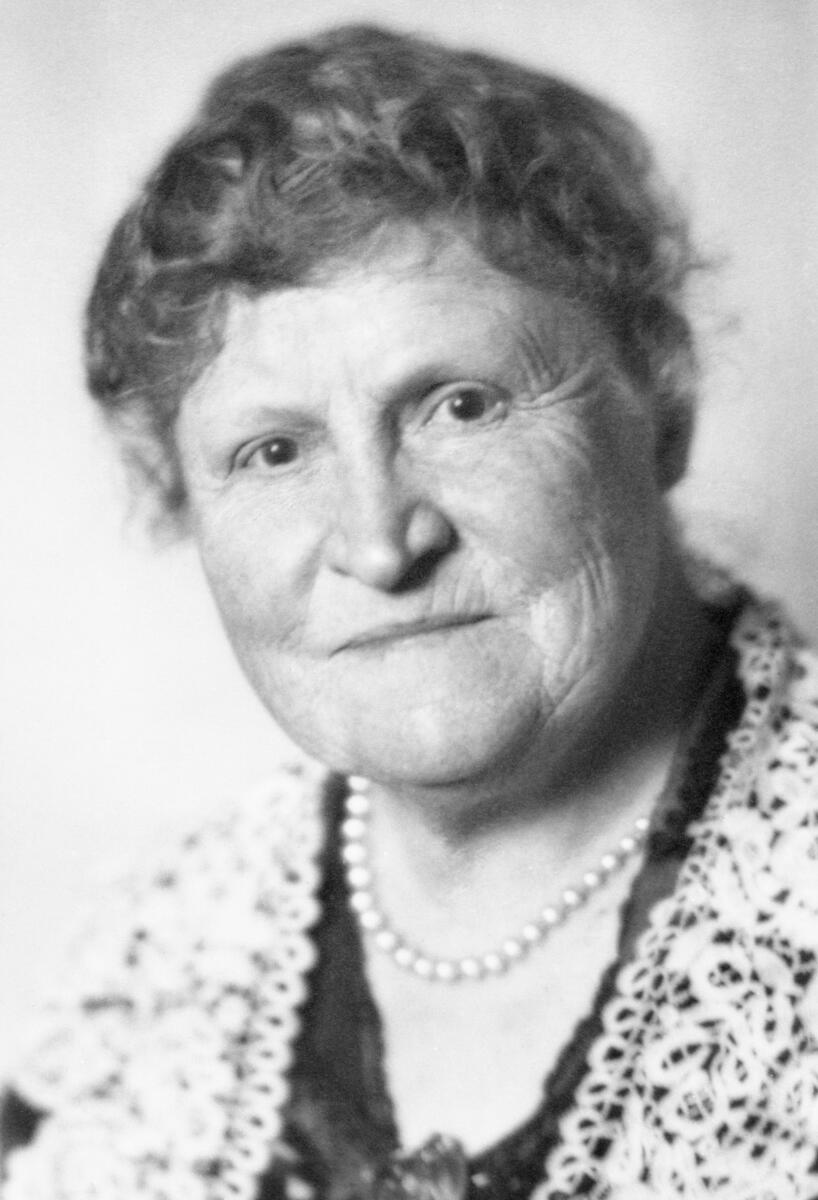
- Born: Henrietta Louise Muir; 18 December 1849; Montreal, Canada East
- Died: 9 November 1931 (aged 81); Fort Macleod, Alberta, Canada
- Occupations: Suffragist; author
- Known for: Women's rights activist
- Spouse: Oliver C. Edwards (m. 1876; died 1915)
- Children: 3, including William Muir Edwards

Henrietta Muir Edwards (18 December 1849 – 9 November 1931) was a Canadian women's rights activist, author and reformer. She was the eldest of "The Famous Five", along with Emily Murphy, Nellie McClung, Louise McKinney and Irene Parlby, who fought to have women recognized as "persons" under the law, and for the woman's right to vote in elections.

She was born Henrietta Louise Muir in Montreal to William Muir and Jane Johnstone. She grew up in an upper-middle-class family that valued culture and religion. From a young age, Henrietta learned attending Christian services and participation in her family religious activities was expected in the Muir family. Henrietta's grandparents emigrated from Scotland to Montreal, where they established the first Baptist chapel. Henrietta later became active several religious organisations but grew disenchanted with old traditions where the exclusion of women was acceptable.

== Biography ==
Edwards was born on 18 December 1849.

Henrietta enjoyed a privileged childhood, receiving a rigorous religious upbringing and a secular education. Her father hired Scottish governesses, as well as art and music teachers. He also sent his daughters to Montreal Ladies' academies. Henrietta's father supported her artistics ambitions and sent Henrietta and her sister Amelia on a European grand tour from 1867-1868. Henrietta's father was a Liberal in his social and political views. Discussions about local or international development at home helped shape Henrietta's later views in life.

As a young woman, Henrietta's father continued to encourage her studies while supporting her charitable projects. In 1871, Henrietta attended lectures given by Montreal Ladies' Educational Association, headed by Anne Molson. These lectures lobbied for a women's college at McGill. Henrietta and Amelia opened the Young Women's Reading Room, which then became the Working Girls' Association. The association offered boarding facilities and job training in addition to a library and educational classes. In 1878 the sisters created the Montreal Women's Printing Office, which provided training and employment for women. The office produced a monthly paper, written, designed, and printed by women. Henrietta opened an art studio, taught pupils, and created illustrations for publications.

Henrietta married Dr. Oliver C. Edwards in 1876 and they had three children: Alice, William, and Margaret. When Henrietta and Oliver married, they signed a similar marriage contract as her parents on their wedding day. It guaranteed Henrietta would have her own property and protected her from legal responsibility for Oliver’s business obligations and personal debts. This marriage contract was considered ahead of its time and supported women’s legal rights. In 1883, they moved as a family to Indian Head, Northwest Territories (now Saskatchewan). Oliver was the government doctor for the Indigenous reserves there, and she continued to pursue women’s rights and feminist organizations on the prairies.

In 1890, Edwards's husband fell ill, so the family moved to the nation's capital, Ottawa. Through the Ottawa WCTU, she took part in the campaigns for a plebiscite on prohibition and became involved in the annual petitions to the federal government requesting votes for women. Henrietta also "took up the cause of female prisoners", while working with Lady Aberdeen, wife of the then Governor General of Canada, to create the National Council of Women of Canada (NCWC). The NCWC was founded in 1893, the same year the Canadian government commissioned Edwards, who was also an artist, to paint a set of dishes for the Canadian exhibit at the 1893 World's Columbian Exposition.

Henrietta served as the chair for Laws Governing Women and Children, and because of her expertise in this area of the law was appointed chair of the organization's Provincial Council of Alberta. With Lady Aberdeen, Henrietta also helped establish the Victorian Order of Nurses (VON) in 1897. Having established an art studio at the YWCA, Henrietta taught and accepted portrait commissions from figures such as businessman and MP Sir Donald Alexander Smith and Liberal leader Wilfrid Laurier. Henrietta also helped launch the executive of the Ottawa Decorative Art Society, entered the 1892 RCA exhibition.

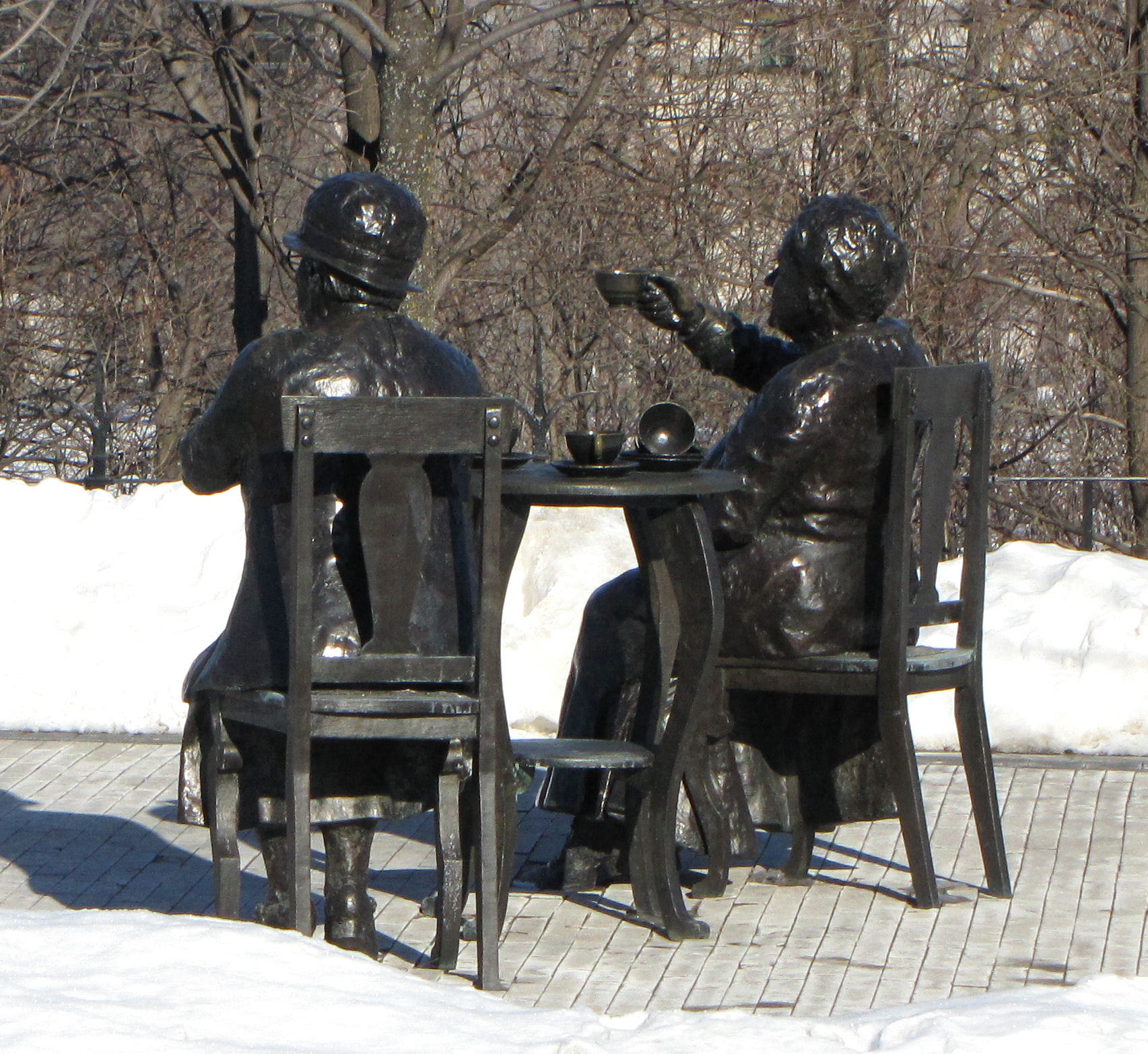
Holding tea cup, Famous Five statue, Parliament Hill, Ottawa

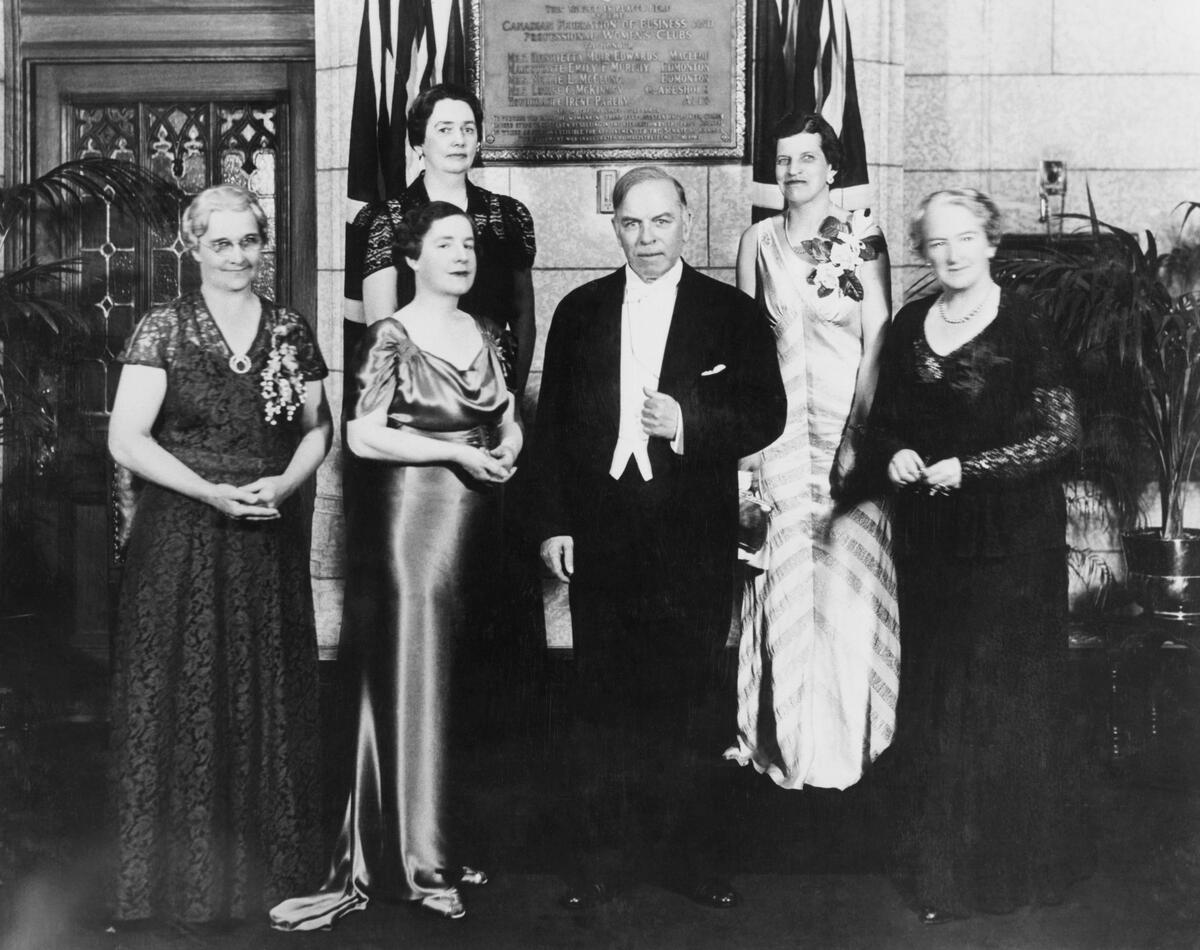
Prime Minister W.L. Mackenzie King unveiled a plaque from the Canadian Federation of Business and Professional Women's Clubs honouring Edwards and her colleagues from the Persons Case (1938, Edwards's daughter-in-law at left)

Henrietta and her family returned to the Northwest Territories around 1903, where her husband was posted to Fort Macleod as a medical officer to the Blood tribe. During this time, Henrietta joined the Women’s Christian Temperance Union (WCTU) and also became vice-president of the North-West Territories chapter of the NCWC. Through the WCTU that Henrietta engaged in campaigns for women’s suffrage and equal rights. The First World War caused a shortage of supplies and when morale was low, the Government of Canada selected individuals to assist in an advisory capacity about how to invoke stricter conservation measures. Henrietta was part of the selected committee, and it was the first time in Canadian history that a woman had been called upon for a review of public policy with the Government.

Edwards wrote two books about women and the legal problems she was trying to overcome: Legal Status of Canadian Women (1908) and Legal Status of Women in Alberta (1921). Henrietta campaigned for women's rights to vote. She organized campaigns, circulated petitions and attended meetings. Women won the right to vote and hold provincial office in Alberta on 19 April 1916. She worked with Louise McKinney, Irene Parlby and Emily Murphy to "lobby the Alberta government for recognition of dower and matrimonial property rights." This friendship and collaboration would be called upon again to fight for the Persons Case in the late 1920s, which established that Canadian women were legally recognized as persons eligible for appointment to the Canadian Senate.

Edwards was buried in Mount Pleasant Municipal Cemetery, Edmonton. The memorial erected to her memory reads "Let her own works praise her. Her delight was in the law of the Lord" Her date of death on the memorial is given as 9 November 1931. The Canadian Encyclopedia has also identified this to be her date of death.

== Legacy ==
In 1962, Edwards was recognized as Person of National Historic Significance by the government of Canada. A plaque commemorating this is placed at the entrance to Fort Macleod Post Office, Haultain Ave & 22 St., Fort Macleod, Alberta. The "Persons case" was recognized as an Historic Event in 1997. In addition, in October 2009, the Senate voted to name Edwards and the rest of the Five, Canada's first "honorary senators."
