= 218th Field Artillery Regiment =

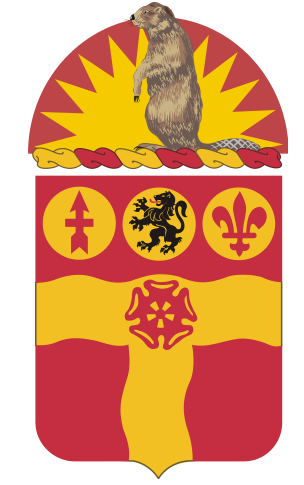
- Coat of arms
- Active: 1866 – present
- Country: United States
- Allegiance: Oregon
- Branch: United States Army National Guard
- Type: Field artillery
- Garrison/HQ: Forest Grove, Oregon
- Motto: PER ANGUSTA AD AUGUSTA (Through Difficulties To Things Of Honor)
- Branch color: Red and yellow

Insignia
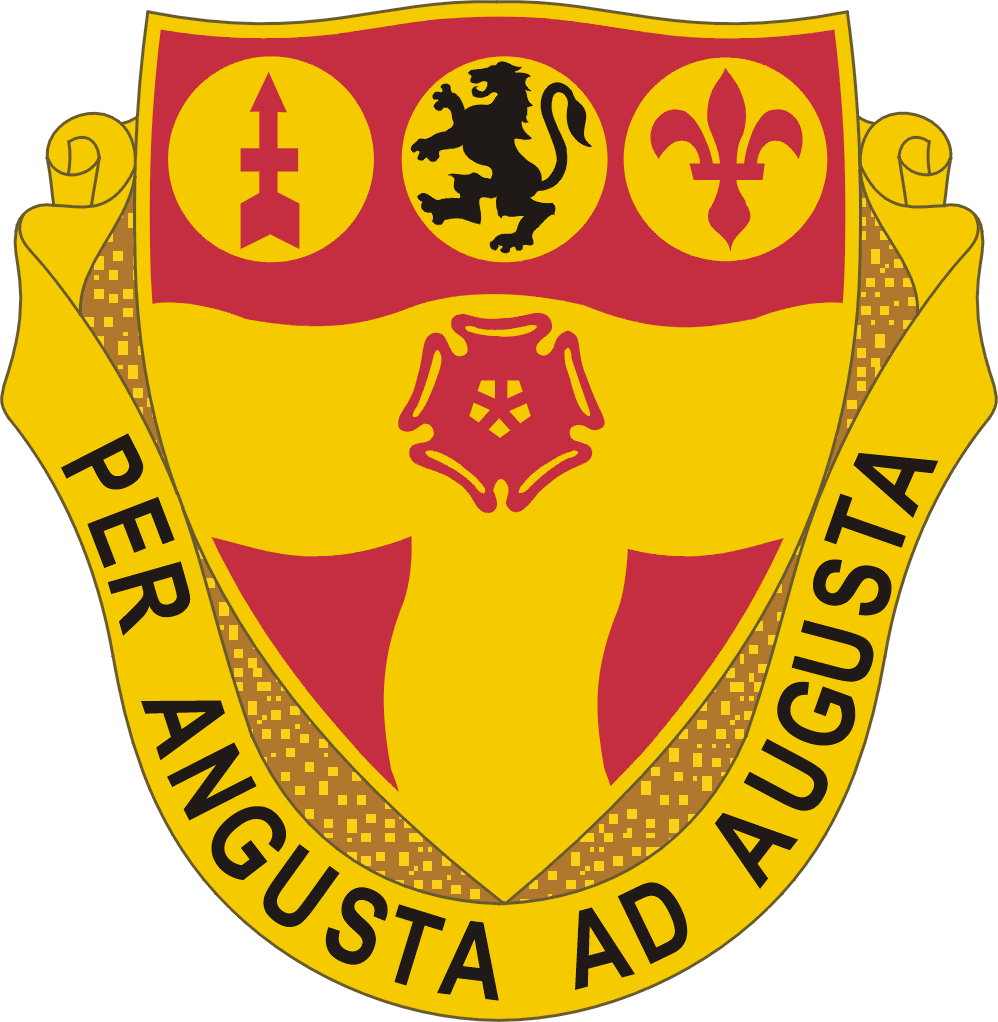
- Distinctive unit insignia

The 218th Field Artillery Regiment is a Field Artillery Regiment of the United States Army, Oregon Army National Guard. With lineage tracing back to 1866, it is the oldest National Guard artillery unit west of the Mississippi River continually serving. Today, its 2nd Battalion (2-218th Field Artillery) is a part of the 41st Infantry Brigade Combat Team and is currently headquartered in Forest Grove, Oregon.

== Current structure ==
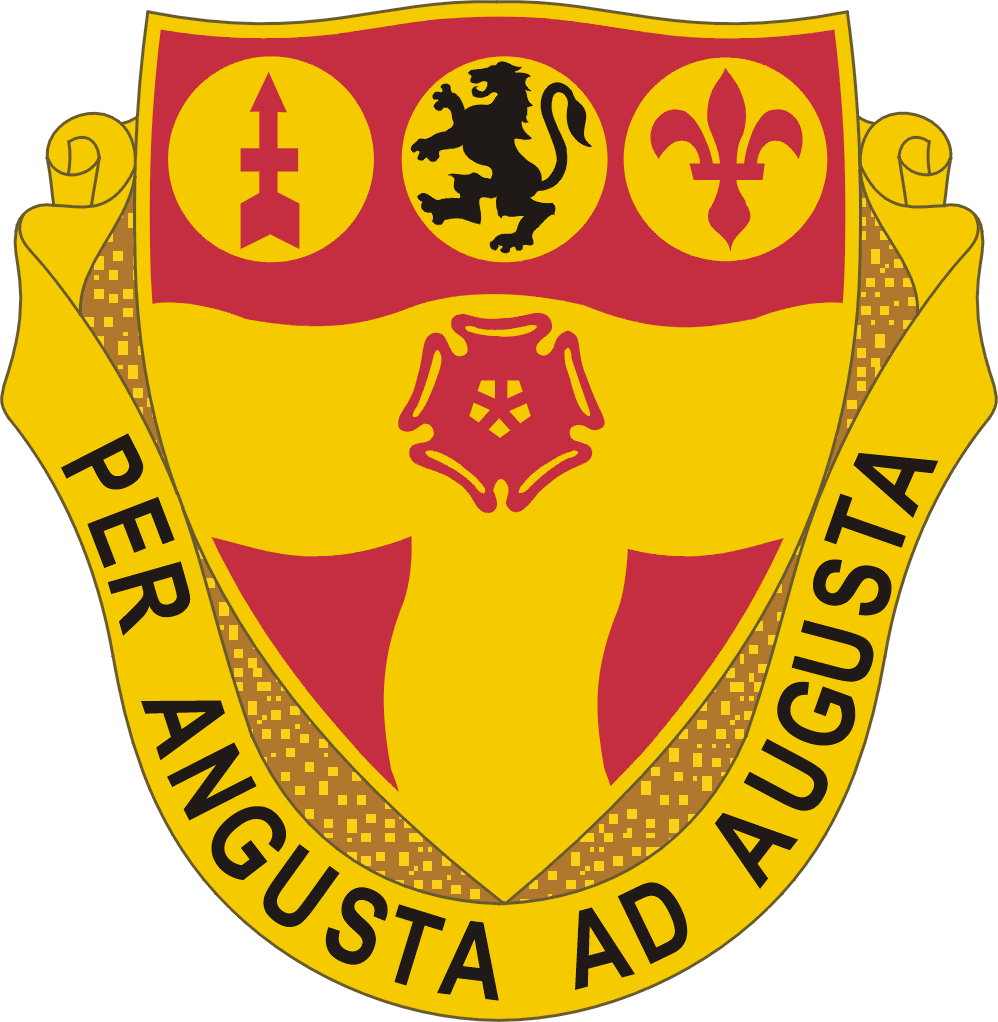
- 2nd Battalion, 218th Field Artillery Regiment
  - Headquarters and Headquarters Battery Forest Grove
  - Battery A, Portland
  - Battery B, McMinnville
  - Battery C, Portland
  - Headquarters and Headquarters Battery, Detachment 1, Salem
  - Headquarters and Headquarters Battery, Detachment 2, Las Cruces
  - F Forward Support Company, 141st Brigade Support Battalion, Forest Grove

== Early history ==
The 218th Field Artillery Regiment traces its lineage to the Portland Light Battery, a militia unit founded by Portland volunteers in 1866, immediately after the American Civil War. However, the status of militia units declined as the citizens didn't consider a well-armed and disciplined reserve force necessary anymore. By 1872, the Portland Light Battery and three infantry companies were all that remained of the Oregon militia. During the Bannock War in 1878, the battery was mobilized to defend northeastern Oregon, but it never saw action and the Indians surrendered by September of that year. The Bannock War did, however, convince Oregonians of the need of skilled reserve forces, and new units were formed and the old ones were revamped. Membership in these militia organizations was more fraternal than military. For example, the published by-laws of the Portland Light Battery stated that "new members shall be voted upon by the membership and if three nay votes are counted, the man will not be accepted." Dues of fifty cents per month were charged to enable a member to buy his own equipment. Centralized control and military standardization within the State was nonexistent.

During the late Nineteenth Century, the National Guard underwent serious reorganization and expansion. In 1916, Battery A of the artillery was sent to the Mexico–United States border for federal service defending against cross-border raids by Pancho Villa. While the unit did not see combat, it underwent valuable training. In 1917, The Oregon Field Artillery helped form the 147th Field Artillery Regiment. The 147th served with the 32nd Infantry Division during World War I. The 218th claims heritage from the 147th, thus, the symbol of the 32nd Division is on its coat of arms.

=== Interwar period ===
The 218th Field Artillery Regiment was first constituted in the National Guard in 1921, assigned to the 224th Field Artillery Brigade (General Headquarters Reserve), and allotted to Illinois. It was placed on the "Deferred National Guard" list on 2 July 1923, redesignated the 417th Field Artillery Regiment (DNG), and allotted to the Sixth Corps Area. The 1st Battalion was withdrawn from allotment to Illinois on 30 September 1924 and allotted to Oregon. Battery A was organized on 18 May 1925 at Portland, Oregon, by redesignating Battery A, 148th Field Artillery. The reminder of the regiment was withdrawn from the Sixth Corps Area on 17 September 1927. The Headquarters, 1st Battalion, was organized and federally recognized on 5 April 1929 at Portland. The remainder of the regiment was allotted to Oregon on 13 November 1929 and reorganized as a 155-mm howitzer regiment. It was assigned on 12 December 1929 to the 41st Division. The regimental headquarters was organized and federally recognized on 5 June 1930 at Portland. The 3rd Battalion was organized and federally recognized on 6 June 1930 at Portland. The regiment conducted annual summer training at numerous locations to include Fort Lewis, Washington, Camp Jackson, Medford, Oregon, Camp Clatsop, Warrenton, Oregon, Camp Murray, Washington, but most years at Fort Stevens, Oregon. It was inducted into federal service on 16 September 1940 at homme stations and moved to Camp Murray, where it arrived on 19 September 1940. It was transferred on 20 March 1941 to Fort Lewis.

== World War II ==
In late 1941, the 218th Field Artillery was ordered to head to the Philippines to guard against possible Japanese attack. When the Attack on Pearl Harbor occurred, the 218th was at sea, and was immediately rerouted back to San Francisco to rejoin the 41st Division at Fort Lewis. America had entered World War II, and the 41st Infantry Division was sent to the Pacific War to fight against the Empire of Japan. In the summer of 1943, the 162nd Infantry Regiment alongside a Brigade of Australian troops assaulted Nassau Bay on the north coast of New Guinea in order to drive the Japanese out of Salamaua. The landings were disastrous, and heavy surf swamped may landing craft. The infantry struggled to get ashore, and the invasion was soon called "shipwreck landing." The 218th Field Artillery Battalion was slated to follow the 162nd Infantry in, but not enough boats were available anymore, so B and C Batteries landed several days later. Japanese snipers, booby traps, and jungle ambushes greeted the artillerymen starting the first day, and the constant rain broken by periods of intense steamy heat marked a difficult campaign ahead. The 80 men of C Battery hauled their 4 M116 howitzers through 5 miles of jungle by hand, and were forced to cross and recross rivers in the twisting terrain. Despite the difficulties of moving howitzers through the jungle, the men were dug in on 8 July 1943, six thousand yards from a Japanese controlled hill called, "the Pimple."

On 8 July, the men of C Battery gathered to sign their names on the first shell to be fired by the 218th in combat in World War II. For several days, the 218th shelled the Pimple and its Japanese defenders in support of the US and Australian infantry assaults. The men were forced to hand carry the heavy shells hundreds of yards from the beach in order to resupply the howitzers. Some ammunition was air-dropped but most rounds were destroyed or damaged on impact. The 218th's NCOs organized working parties to sift through the damaged shells and salvage what primers and projectiles they could from the dented casings. On 10 July, C Battery fired in support of Australian assault and managed to destroy an entire Japanese company with nine high-explosive shells fired in thirty-six seconds. The enemy company had stopped for a rest while marching, and made a perfect target for the 75mm howitzers; at least 50 were killed and many more were wounded. The Australians took the Pimple the next day.

As the New Guinea Campaign continued, the 218th Field Artillery supported infantry assaults on countless ridges and enemy strongpoints. On 4 August, the unit suffered its first combat fatalities when an Australian mortar round fell short and killed a forward observer team of five men. On 1 September, as the Battle of Salamaua was nearing its conclusion, the Japanese counterattacked. Dawn Company, 15th Brigade, Australian Army was cut off on a steep jungle ridge, and was low on ammunition. Captain Burelbach, the 218th's FSO (Fire Support Officer) attached to Dawn Company expertly called for fire on the attackers, and all the 218th's guns opened fire, driving the Japanese back, and rescuing Dawn Company. Japanese Marines took up the assault the next day, and the beleaguered Australians seemed on the verge of collapse. CPT Burelbah again called for the 218th to support, and the Japanese were once again thrown back. Later in the day, Dawn Company's CO, Captain Provan, hobbled into the 218th perimeter to thank the Oregon artillerymen who saved the lives of his men.

The regiment would go on to serve in the Philippines Campaign from 1944 to 1945, and returned home when the war ended. The 41st Infantry Division was deactivated in 1946.

== Deployments to Iraq ==
The Second Battalion of the Regiment continues to exist as a part of the 41st Infantry Brigade Combat Team. During the Iraq War, there was less need for artillery, and the 2-218th has been called upon to serve in multiple non-artillery duties. Several volunteers from the Battalion agreed to serve in infantry companies during the Iraq War (OIF II), including Forward Observer Patrick Eldred. Serving with B Co, 2-162 Infantry, Eldred called for close artillery and air support over the course of 16 days of desperate fighting during the Battle of Najaf in 2004.

The 2-218th Field Artillery was again called to serve in Iraq from July 2009-April 2010. They served as a route security force and escorted more than 13,000 trucks in hostile environments as US forces began withdrawing from Iraq. For their service in a role not usually suited for an artillery unit, the battalion earned the Meritorious Unit Commendation.
