= William Edwardes =

William Edwardes may refer to:

- William Edwardes, 1st Baron Kensington (c. 1711–1801), British peer and MP
- William Edwardes, 2nd Baron Kensington (1777–1852), British peer and MP
- William Edwardes, 3rd Baron Kensington (1801–1872), British peer and naval commander
- William Edwardes, 4th Baron Kensington (1835–1896), British peer and Liberal politician

== See also ==
- William Edwards (disambiguation)
