= Bill Edwards =

Bill Edwards may refer to:

- Big Bill Edwards (1877–1943), American football player, guard for Princeton University football team, first president of first American Football League
- Bill Edwards (basketball) (born 1971), retired American basketball player
- Bill Edwards (actor) (1918–1999), American film and television actor
- Bill Edwards (English footballer) (1874–after 1896), English footballer with Small Heath
- Bill Edwards (Australian footballer) (1933–2018), Australian rules footballer with Richmond
- Bill Edwards (American football coach) (1905–1987), American football player and coach
- Bill Edwards (offensive lineman) (1920–2009), American football offensive lineman for the New York Giants
- Bill Edwards (businessman) (1945–2026), American businessman in Florida
- Billy Edwards (boxer) (1844–1907), English boxer
- Billy Edwards (footballer, born 1952), English footballer
- Billy Edwards (footballer, born 1895) (1896–1952), English footballer

== See also ==
- William Edwards (disambiguation)
