= William Edward (disambiguation) =

William Edward (1916–2005) was a cricketer.

William Edward may also refer to:

- William Edward, List of Lord Mayors of London

== See also ==
- William Edwards (disambiguation)
