= William Muir Edwards =

Canadian academic (1879–1918)

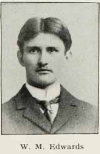
- William Muir Edwards (1901)
- Born: November 14, 1879; Montreal, Quebec, Canada
- Died: November 14, 1918 (aged 39); Edmonton, Alberta, Canada
- Education: McGill University
- Occupations: Professor of Mathematics and Civil Engineering
- Employer: University of Alberta
- Spouse: Evelyn Douglas (m. 1906)
- Children: 3
- Parents: Oliver Cromwell Edwards (father); Henrietta Muir Edwards (mother)

William Muir Edwards (14 November 1879 – 14 November 1918) was the first professor of Mathematics and Civil Engineering at the University of Alberta. His mother, Henrietta Edwards, was a notable women's rights activist, author, artist, and member of The Famous Five. He died 14 November 1918 during the Spanish flu pandemic after contracting influenza while caring for ill students at Pembina Hall at the University of Alberta.

== Early life and education ==
Edwards was born on 14 November 1879 to Dr. Oliver Cromwell Edwards and Henrietta (née Muir) Edwards in Montreal, Quebec. He attended local schools, and following his family's relocation to Ottawa, Ontario, he attended Ottawa Collegiate.

In 1900, Edwards began his studies in applied science at McGill University. A gifted athlete, Edwards played rugby for McGill University and broke the university's record for the two-mile run, a feat which earned him the McGill Athletic Association silver medal. He also competed in track and field events, winning a first place medal for high jump in 1902. After graduating in 1904, he enrolled in a Master of Science, with a specialization in civil engineering. He graduated in 1905 and received the British Association medal for Applied Sciences.

In 1906, he married Evelyn Douglas. Together, the couple had three children.

== Professional life ==
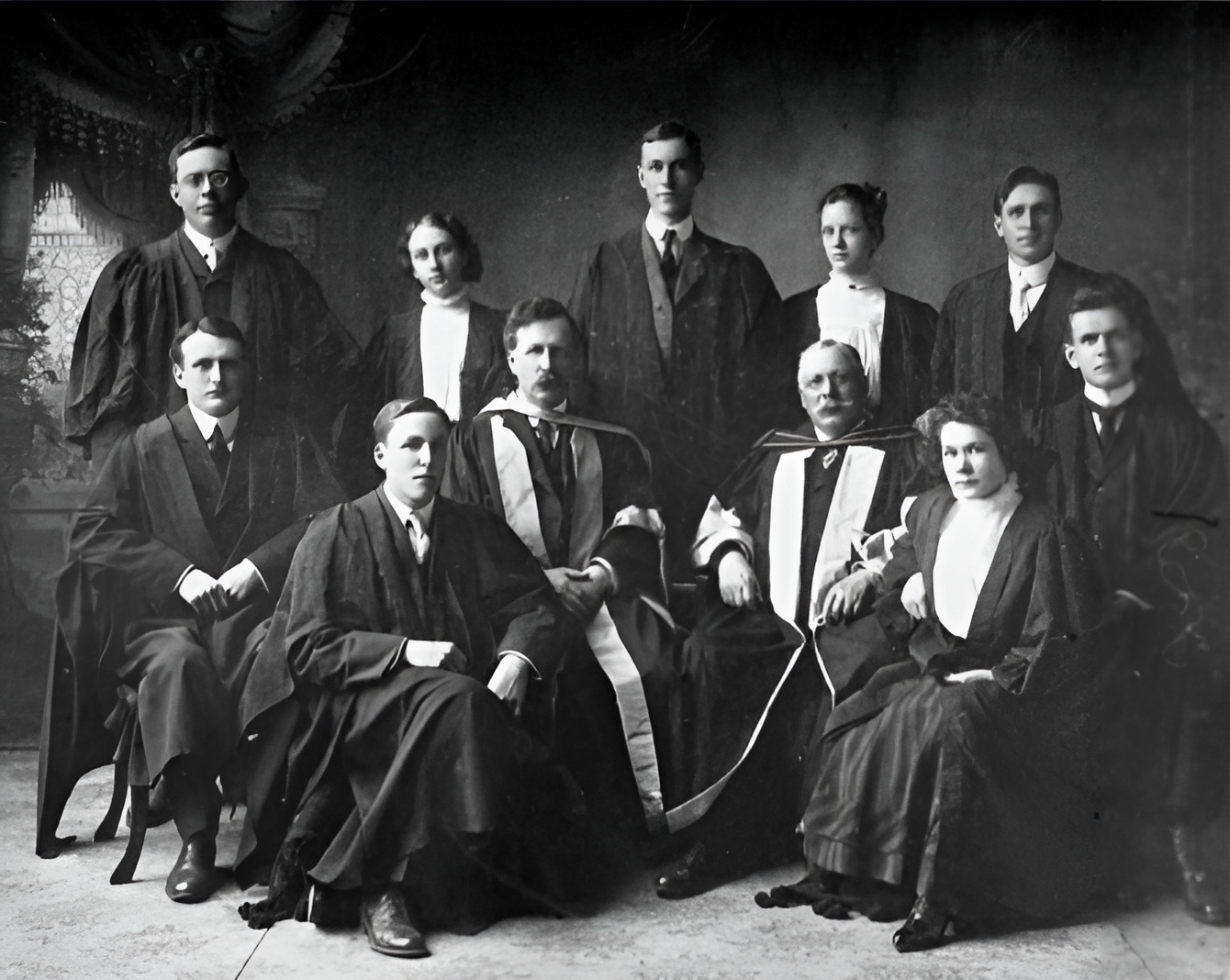
First Students' Union Executive, University of Alberta (1908). Standing, left to right: Albert Ottewell, Ada J. Johnston, S.B. Montgomery, Ethel Anderson, Jim Law. Seated, left to right: Professor William Muir Edwards, Cecil Alexander Rutherford, University of Alberta President Henry Marshall Tory, Premier Alexander Cameron Rutherford, Kathleen Wilson, Stacey McCall

Following his graduation from McGill, Edwards briefly worked in the private sector before being hired by his alma mater as a lecturer in science and mathematics. He was promoted to assistant professor of mathematics in 1907.

It was during Edwards's time studying and working at McGill that he became well acquainted with Henry Marshall Tory, then Associate Professor of Mathematics, who, in 1908, accepted the invitation of Alberta Premier Alexander Cameron Rutherford to head the University of Alberta as its first president. Tory was clearly impressed with the young Edwards as he invited him to join the university's faculty as Assistant Professor of Mathematics and Civil Engineering, an offer which Edwards accepted. Of the first five professors — Henry Marshall Tory, Luther Herbert Alexander, William Hardy Alexander, Edmund Kemper Broadus, and Edwards — he was the only faculty member to be appointed to the rank and pay of assistant professor.

Alongside his teaching duties at the University of Alberta, Edwards was actively involved in university athletics and student affairs. He served as the honorary chair for the first University of Alberta Students' Union and as honorary president of the Athletic Association for many years. A lover of sports, he organized sports matches for students and undertook the arduous task of laying out the first temporary football grid on the empty fields outside Strathcona. Additionally, he served as coach for several years for the University of Alberta football team.

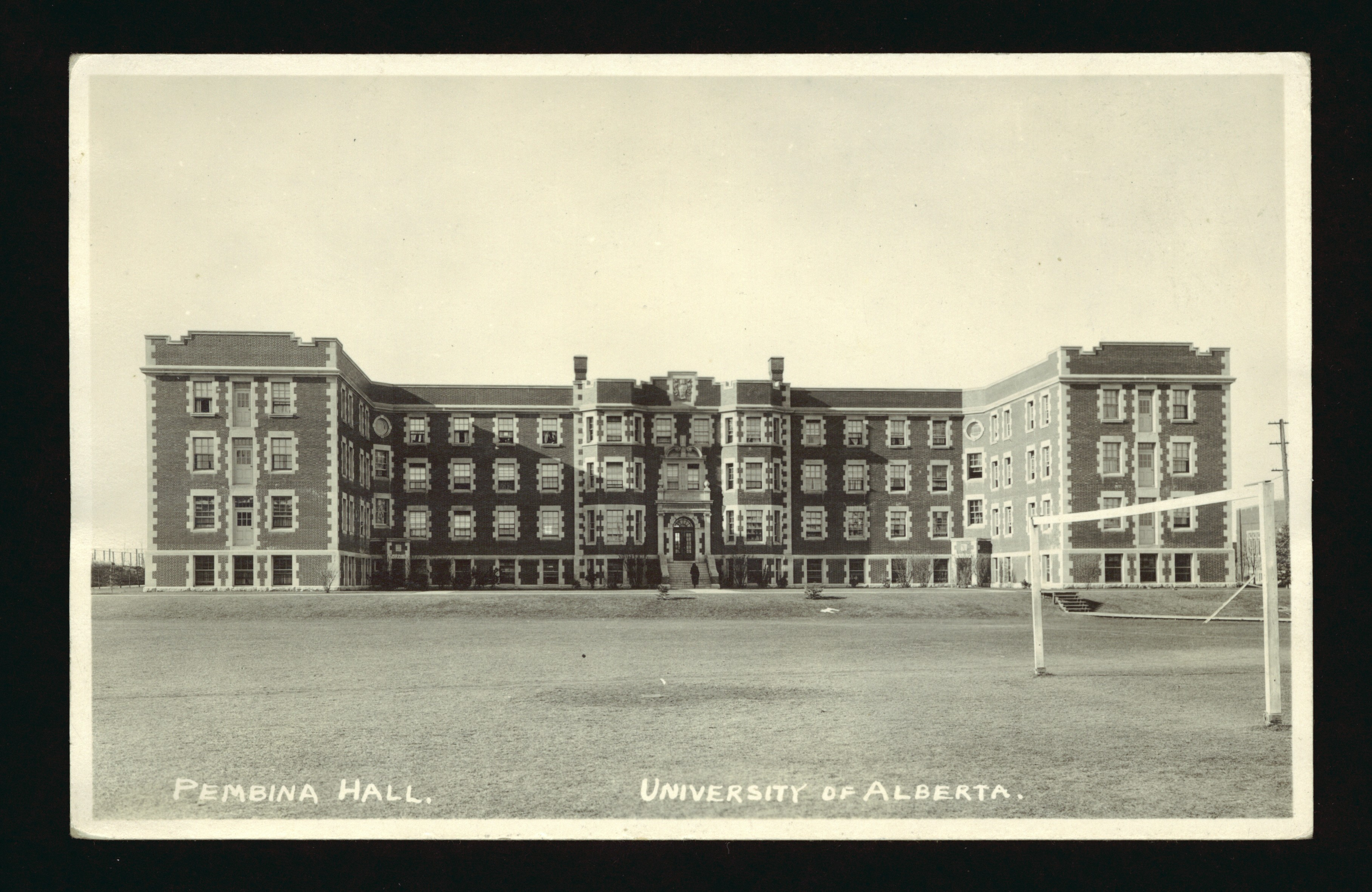
Pembina Hall, University of Alberta (1914)

Outside of his regular duties, Edwards's expertise was occasionally requested as the University of Alberta expanded. In 1913, as construction on Pembina Hall progressed, rumours quickly spread among the student population that the building was sinking due to the large piles of sand created during excavation. To quell the rumours, Tory tasked Edwards with ensuring the foundation of Pembina Hall was level and the ground sturdy. Upon completion of his survey, Edwards found "not 1/8th inch difference” between any two sections of the foundation.

In 1916, alongside the Wuaneita Society, Edwards edited the University Weekly News Letter - a newsletter which published University of Alberta and Edmonton news for students of the university serving in the First World War. The University Weekly New Letter was occasionally published in the University of Alberta's student newspaper, The Gateway. He remained as editor until his death in November 1918.

=== 1910 typhoid epidemic ===
In 1910, a typhoid epidemic broke out in Edmonton after an ice flow on the North Saskatchewan river created water eddies that accidentally diverted sewage into the city's drinking water. Many residents became ill, and several deaths occurred, leading to the temporary closure of schools and the University of Alberta. Edwards was among several individuals tasked with finding the cause of the contaminated water. He identified the cause of the outbreak being a faulty design of the inlet pipe at the city's water treatment plant and quickly fixed the pipe to ensure that such a situation would not occur again.

== Death and legacy ==
In October 1918, Pembina Hall was transformed into a temporary hospital to care for the increasing number of Edmonton residents and university students who fell ill with the Spanish flu. Edwards volunteered to serve as the admitting officer and nurse to care for the sick, contracting the flu in the process. He died in Pembina Hall on 14 November 1918, his 39th birthday.

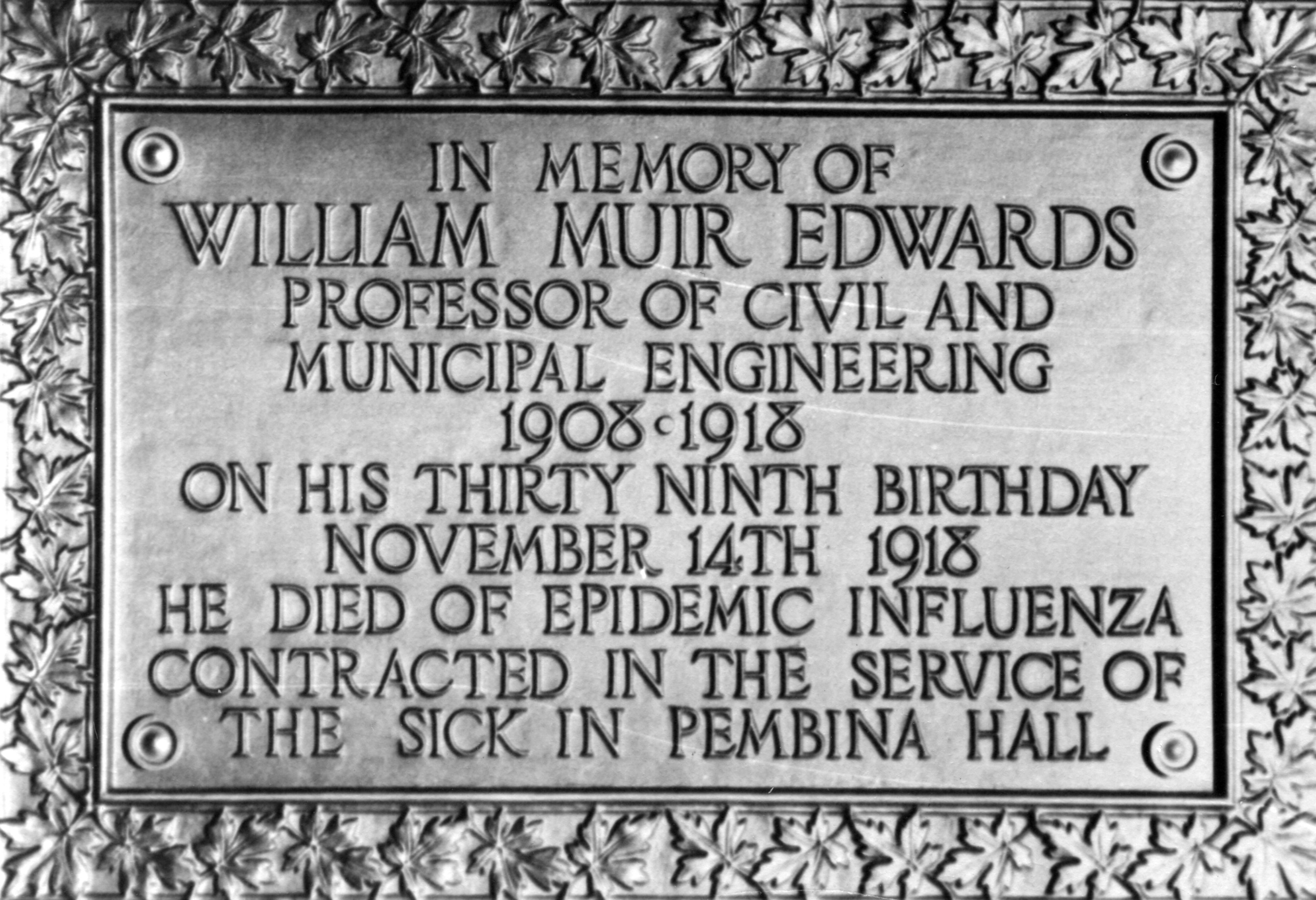
Plaque Honoring William Muir Edwards

A plaque commemorating Edwards's contributions was installed in the Old Arts Building (Arts and Convocation Hall) at the University of Alberta. It remains the only plaque at the University of Alberta dedicated to one professor from the community.

On 14 November 2018, the 100th anniversary of Edwards's death, the city of Edmonton named the day William Muir Edwards Day in honour of his sacrifice and service.

In 2019, the University of Alberta created the William Muir Edwards Citizenship Award, named in Edwards's honour. The award recognizes undergraduate students in the Faculty of Engineering who have made "exceptional contributions to society."
