= John McLennon =

U.S. Army soldier (1855–1888)

- Born: 1855; Fort Belknap, Texas
- Died: 1888 (aged 32–33); Rock Springs, Wyoming
- Military career
- Allegiance: United States of America
- Branch: United States Army
- Service years: 1871–1888
- Rank: Sergeant
- Conflicts: Indian Wars
- Awards: Medal of Honor

John McLennon (c. 1855–May 14, 1888) was a United States Army musician who was awarded the Medal of Honor for his actions at the Battle of the Big Hole in Montana in 1877.

== Biography ==
McLennon's parents were Michael and Mary (Ryan). His father entered the US military and McLennon was born Fort Belknap, Texas in about 1855. His family had a three-generation-long connection with the 7th Infantry. His father Michael also served in Company A for at least 14 years, through the American Civil War. Two of his nephews also served with the 7th Infantry in the Spanish–American War. One of McLennon's brothers-in-law, Patrick Rogan, served with him in Company A and was also awarded a Medal of Honor for their actions at the Battle of the Big Hole. Another of his sisters married Mildon Wilson, another United States Army soldier from the 7th Infantry who also secured the medal of Honor for his activity during the Indian Wars.

In September 1871, McLennon enlisted in the Army at Fort Ellis, Montana Territory. He never reached a height over five feet. Later, McLennon became a sergeant and stayed with the infantry until he died from a kidney inflammation on May 14, 1888, participating in many battles against Indians during his career. He died of "acute nephritis". He never married and is buried in Rock Springs, Wyoming, beside his relative Rogan.

== Medal of Honor citation ==
Rank and organization: Musician, Company A, 7th U.S. Infantry. Place and date: At Big Hole, Mont., 9 August 1877. Entered service at: ------. Birth: Fort Belknap, Tex. Date of issue: 2 December 1878.

Citation:

Gallantry in action.

== See also ==
- List of Medal of Honor recipients for the Indian Wars
