= William Edwards (inventor) =

American inventor

William Edwards (c. 1770–1851) was an American inventor, grandson of Jonathan Edwards, the elder. He was born in Elizabethtown, New Jersey. He introduced a valuable improvement in the manufacture of leather, whereby tanning was accomplished in a quarter of the usual time. He invented machines which greatly advanced the production of leather in America.
