= Bill Edwards (Australian footballer) =

Australian rules footballer (1933–2018)

Personal information
- Full name: Bill Edwards
- Born: 3 July 1933
- Died: 22 August 2018 (aged 85)
- Original team: Hawthorn reserves / Moorabbin
- Height: 183 cm (6 ft 0 in)
- Weight: 85 kg (187 lb)

Playing career^{1}
Years	Club	Games (Goals)
1959	Richmond	2 (1)
- ^{1} Playing statistics correct to the end of 1959.

Bill Edwards (3 July 1933 – 22 August 2018) was an Australian rules footballer who played with Richmond in the Victorian Football League (VFL).
