= William J. Edwards (general) =

U.S. Army general

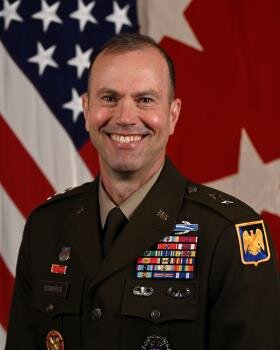
- Official portrait, 2024
- Military career
- Allegiance: United States
- Branch: United States Army
- Service years: 1990–present
- Rank: Major General
- Commands: NATO Headquarters Sarajevo; Oregon Land Component; 41st Infantry Brigade Combat Team; 2nd Battalion, 162nd Infantry
- Conflicts: Iraq War
- Awards: Defense Superior Service Medal (2); Legion of Merit (2); Bronze Star Medal (2)

William J. Edwards is a United States Army major general who has served as the director of strategy, policy, plans, and international affairs of the National Guard Bureau since July 2024. He most recently served as the deputy director for Strategic Initiatives of the Joint Staff from January 2021 to May 2024. Previously, he served as the Commander and Senior Military Representative to the NATO Headquarters Sarajevo from December 12, 2019, to January 2021.

Military offices
Preceded by John M. Hillyer	Mobilization Assistant to the Director of Operations of the United States Indo-Pacific Command; 2018–2019	Succeeded by ???
Preceded by Marti J. Bissell	Commander and Senior Military Representative to the NATO Headquarters Sarajevo; 2019–2021	Succeeded by Eric Folkestad
Preceded by Lawrence B. Jackson	Deputy Director for Strategic Initiatives of the Joint Staff; 2021–2024	Succeeded by Jamelle C. Shawley
Preceded by Darrin E. Slaten	Director of Strategy, Policy, Plans, and International Affairs of the National Guard Bureau; 2024–present	Incumbent
