= 41st Infantry Brigade Combat Team =

- Shoulder sleeve insignia
- Active: 1 March 1963–7 February 2008 (41st Infantry Bge.); 7 February 2008–present (41st IBCT)
- Country: United States
- Branch: Army National Guard
- Role: Brigade combat team
- Part of: 40th Infantry Division
- Garrison/HQ: Oregon
- Nickname: Sunset (special designation) Jungleers
- Engagements: Iraq War (U.S. phase, 2003-2010); War in Afghanistan (2001-2021); Combined Joint Task Force – Horn of Africa; Capital response peace keeping Mission

Insignia
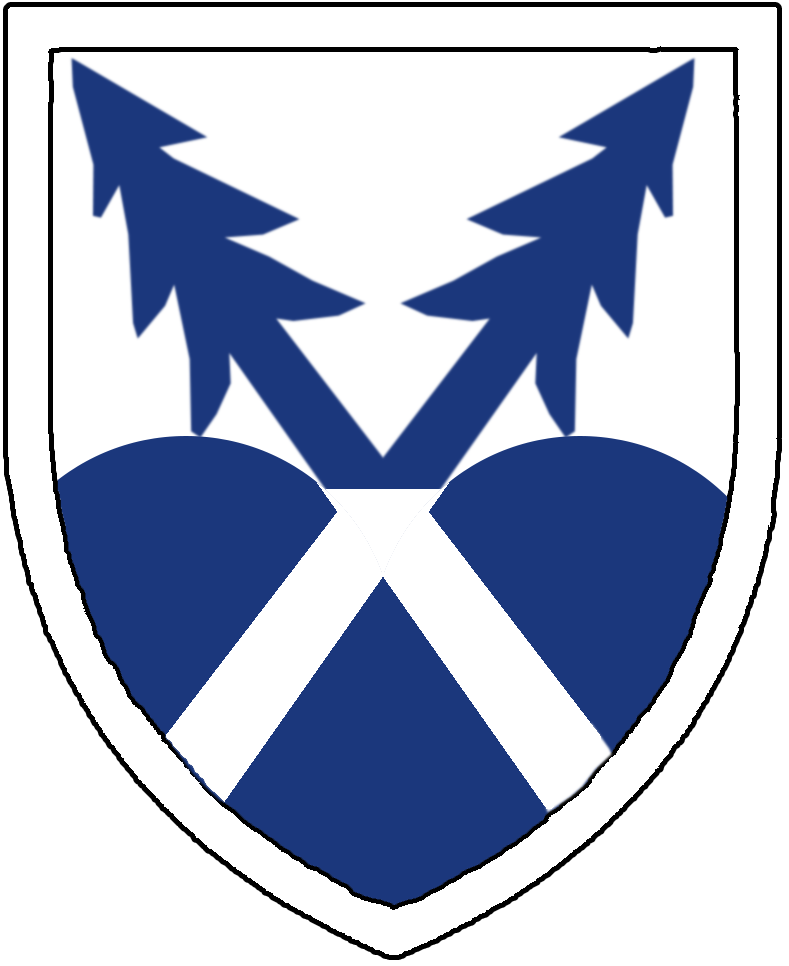
- Identification symbol: 41ST INFANTRY BRIDAGE OBSOLETE SSI

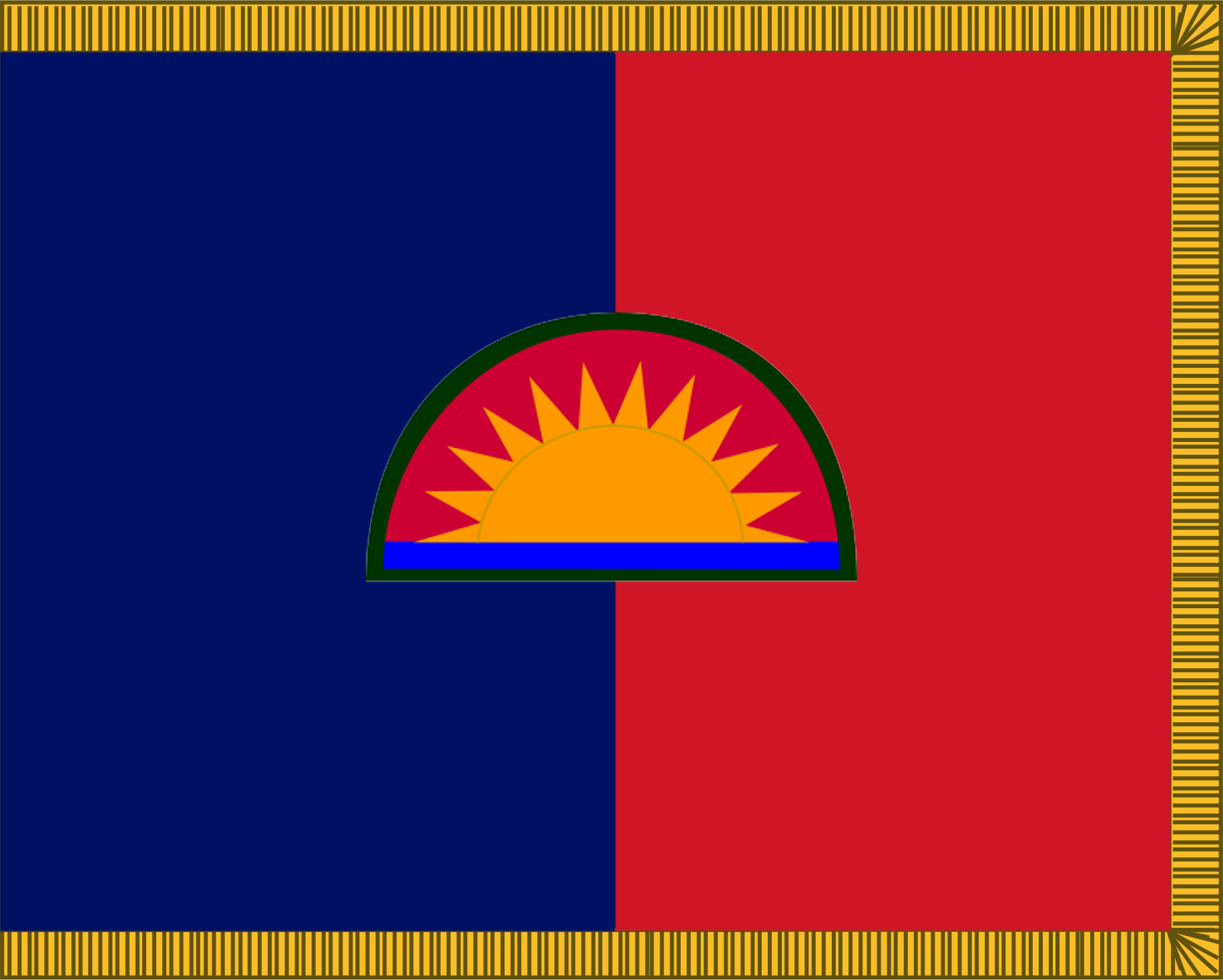
- 41st Infantry Brigade Combat Team Flag

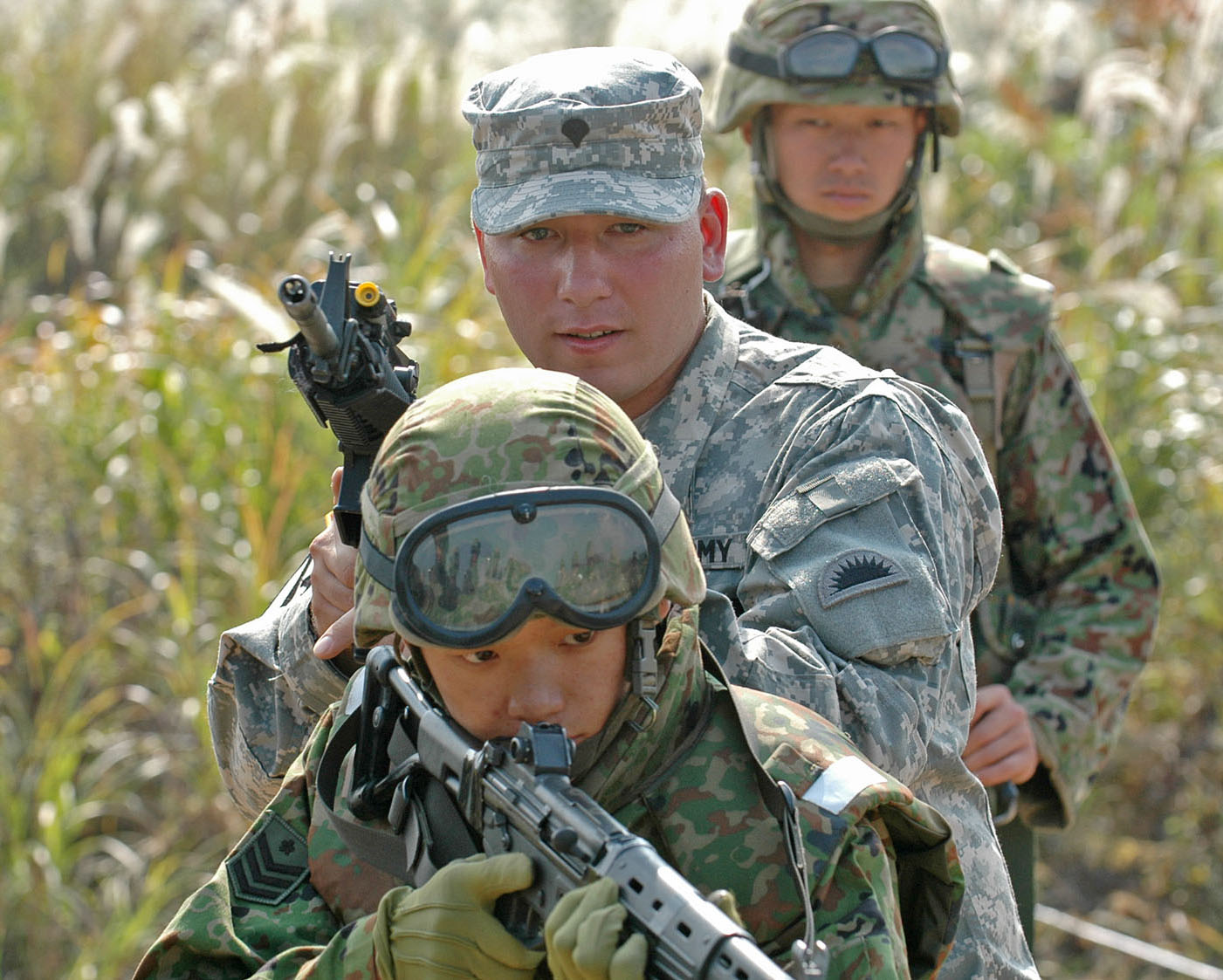
Japanese and Oregon National Guard Soldiers participate in an exercise at the Sekiyama Maneuver Area, Japan.

The 41st Infantry Brigade Combat Team ("Sunset") is an element in the Oregon Army National Guard. Headquartered at Camp Withycombe, Clackamas, Oregon, it was part of the 7th Infantry Division based at Ft. Carson in Colorado (inactivated in 2006). The brigade traces its lineage back to the 41st Infantry Division.

== History ==
Owing to the deployment of active duty troops to the intensifying Vietnam War, Secretary of Defense Robert McNamara established the Selected Reserve Force, composed of Army National Guard units authorized at a full wartime strength of almost 4,500 men and given increased priority for the receipt of new equipment so that they could be mobilized within a week. In return, such units had an increased number of drilling days. The 41st Infantry Division, split between the Washington and Oregon Army National Guard, was among those selected to contribute units to the force and on 15 November 1965 subordinate units of it were withdrawn from it to form the 41st Infantry Brigade. The brigade included two Washington (the 1st and 2nd Battalions of the 161st Infantry) and one Oregon (the 1st Battalion, 162nd Infantry) infantry battalions. Oregon provided the brigade headquarters at Portland, the brigade armored cavalry reconnaissance troop (Troop E, 82nd Cavalry), the field artillery (2nd Battalion, 218th Artillery), engineers (162nd Engineer Company) and the administration company (Company A, 141st Support Battalion). Washington provided the remainder of the 141st Support Battalion and the brigade aviation company. The remaining units of the 41st Infantry Division contributed men to bring those selected for the brigade up to strength, reducing them from 60% to 50% of authorized TO&E strength. The headquarters of the 1st Brigade of the 41st Infantry Division was reorganized to form the brigade headquarters, leaving it with two brigades.

In 1968, the 41st Infantry Division was inactivated. The brigade was redesignated as the 41st Infantry Brigade (Separate), located primarily within the Oregon Army National Guard. In 1975 the brigade became the "roundout brigade" to the 7th Infantry Division, serving this capacity until August 2006.

In 1994, the 41st Separate Infantry Brigade was designated as "Enhanced" and in 1998 was selected as one of three SIB's assigned to the 7th Infantry Division (Light).

In 1999, 136 members of Company C, 2nd Battalion, 162nd Infantry and Company B, 1st Battalion, 186th Infantry were called up to active duty to protect Patriot missile batteries in Saudi Arabia and Kuwait as part of Operation Southern Watch.

On 11 September 2001, advance elements of the 241st Military Intelligence Company arrived in Tuzla, Bosnia, for a seven-month deployment as part of the NATO Stabilization Force.

1st Battalion, 162nd Infantry was deployed 6 February 2003 in support of Operation Iraqi Freedom, the first unit in 41st Brigade to deploy to combat operations since World War II.

Several months after 1st Battalion, 162nd Infantry deployed to Iraq, 2nd Battalion, 162nd Infantry deployed as part of the 39th Infantry Brigade (Enhanced) (Arkansas National Guard) to Iraq. The battalion served in Baghdad and other parts of Iraq, suffering a number of casualties while conducting stabilization security missions. During the same time, a handful of personnel were sent to train foreign soldiers in Afghanistan as part of Task Force Phoenix III and IV.

The 2nd Platoon of Company B, 2nd Battalion, 162nd Infantry was awarded the Presidential Unit Citation for their gallantry in combat, the first award of the Presidential Unit Citation to an Oregon National Guard unit since World War II.

The Presidential Unit Citation reads: "On 3 November 2004, the unit was placed under the operational control of the 1st Regimental Combat Team of the 1st Marine Division, to execute offensive operations in the central Iraqi city of Fallujah. The unit was selected for the initial attack on the city and tasked with penetrating the enemy's defenses and isolating the Jolan District in northwestern Fallujah. The Jolan District was believed to be the strongest of the enemy's defenses. The unit's rapid penetration deep into the city overwhelmed enemy positions, leading the way for further exploitation by the Marines. Throughout the remainder of the battle, the unit continued to isolate western Fallujah while attacking and destroying numerous enemy strong points. The unit's heroic Soldiers, and their expert use of combined arms firepower, led to the destruction of the insurgents in Fallujah."

In September, 2005, in the aftermath of Hurricane Katrina, Brigadier General Douglas Pritt commanded the majority of the brigade as part of Task Force Oregon in relief and security efforts near the French Quarter in New Orleans. By the end of the month, when Hurricane Rita wreaked havoc again on the Gulf Coast, the 41st was put in charge of the newly designated Joint Task Force Rita to assist in all disaster-related needs in Texas and Louisiana.

In the spring of 2006, Brig. Gen. Pritt and elements of the brigade joined the personnel already in Afghanistan, making the total force approximately 950 soldiers. In 2006 the brigade was redesignated to officially become the 41 Infantry Brigade Combat Team.

The brigade fought in Iraq, under the command of Colonel Daniel R. Hokanson, from 2009 to 2010. The Brigade conducted convoy security for the 13th Expeditionary Sustainment Command and base defense operations across Iraq including Anbar province, Baghdad, and southern Iraq. It was the largest mobilization of Oregon National Guard troops since the 41st Infantry Division mobilized for World War II.

The 41st IBCT and subordinate units were awarded a Meritorious Unit Commendation for its service in Iraq from 29 July 2009 to 15 April 2010 on 24 September 2013 by GO 2013-77.

In 2014, units of the brigade, including the 2nd Battalion, 162nd Infantry, 1st Battalion, 186th Infantry, and 1st Squadron, 82nd Cavalry, deployed to Afghanistan in support of Operation Enduring Freedom.

In 2016, the 41st IBCT was reorganized to add a brigade engineer battalion and a Stryker battalion. AFter these changes the brigade had elements located in Washington and New Mexico.

In an demobilization ceremony at the Salem Convention Center in Salem, Oregon June 14, 2026, personnel from the brigade were released from a year's duty. The Soldiers, from Bravo Company, 2nd Battalion, 162nd Infantry Regiment, and Alpha Company, 741st Brigade Engineer Battalion, deployed to the Horn of Africa from May 2025 to April 2026 as part of Task Force Bataan, a multi-state National Guard formation of more than 1,100 Soldiers from Oregon, New Mexico, Washington and Louisiana. While operating with U.S. Special Operations Command and U.S. Africa Command, including Combined Joint Task Force – Horn of Africa, they secured and defended installations in Djibouti, Kenya and Somalia.

== Organization 2025 ==
- 41st Infantry Brigade Combat Team, at Camp Withycombe (OR) (Oregon Army National Guard)
  - Headquarters and Headquarters Company, 41st Infantry Brigade Combat Team, at Camp Withycombe (OR)
  - 1st Squadron, 303rd Cavalry Regiment, in Centralia (WA) (Washington Army National Guard)
    - Headquarters and Headquarters Troop, 1st Squadron, 303rd Cavalry Regiment, in Centralia (WA)
    - Troop A, 1st Squadron, 303rd Cavalry Regiment, in Montesano (WA)
    - Troop B, 1st Squadron, 303rd Cavalry Regiment, in Longview (WA)
    - Troop C (Dismounted), 1st Squadron, 303rd Cavalry Regiment, in Centralia (WA)
  - 2nd Battalion, 162nd Infantry Regiment, in Springfield (OR) (Oregon Army National Guard)
    - Headquarters and Headquarters Company, 2nd Battalion, 162nd Infantry Regiment, in Springfield (OR)
    - Company A, 2nd Battalion, 162nd Infantry Regiment, in Springfield (OR)
    - Company B, 2nd Battalion, 162nd Infantry Regiment, in Corvallis (OR)
    - Company C, 2nd Battalion, 162nd Infantry Regiment, in Gresham (OR)
    - Company D (Weapons), 2nd Battalion, 162nd Infantry Regiment, at Camp Withycombe (OR)
  - 1st Battalion, 186th Infantry Regiment, in Ashland (OR) (Oregon Army National Guard)
    - Headquarters and Headquarters Company, 1st Battalion, 186th Infantry Regiment, in Ashland (OR)
    - Company A, 1st Battalion, 186th Infantry Regiment, in Medford (OR)
      - Detachment 1, Company A, 1st Battalion, 186th Infantry Regiment, at Kingsley Field Air National Guard Base (OR)
    - Company B, 1st Battalion, 186th Infantry Regiment, in Salem (OR)
    - Company C, 1st Battalion, 186th Infantry Regiment, in Roseburg
      - Detachment 1, Company C, 1st Battalion, 186th Infantry Regiment, in Coos Bay (OR)
    - Company D (Weapons), 1st Battalion, 186th Infantry Regiment, in Grants Pass (OR)
  - 1st Battalion, 200th Infantry Regiment, in Las Cruces (NM) (New Mexico Army National Guard)
    - Headquarters and Headquarters Company, 1st Battalion, 200th Infantry Regiment, in Las Cruces (NM)
    - Company A, 1st Battalion, 200th Infantry Regiment, in Rio Rancho (NM)
    - Company B, 1st Battalion, 200th Infantry Regiment, in Rio Rancho (NM)
    - Company C, 1st Battalion, 200th Infantry Regiment, in Las Cruces (NM)
    - Company D (Weapons), 1st Battalion, 200th Infantry Regiment, in Espanola (NM)
  - 2nd Battalion, 218th Field Artillery Regiment, in Forest Grove (OR) (Oregon Army National Guard)
    - Headquarters and Headquarters Battery, 2nd Battalion, 218th Field Artillery Regiment, in Forest Grove (OR)
      - Detachment 1, Headquarters and Headquarters Battery, 2nd Battalion, 218th Field Artillery Regiment, in Salem (OR)
      - Detachment 2, Headquarters and Headquarters Battery, 2nd Battalion, 218th Field Artillery Regiment, in Las Cruces (NM) (New Mexico Army National Guard)
    - Battery A, 2nd Battalion, 218th Field Artillery Regiment, in Portland (OR)
    - Battery B, 2nd Battalion, 218th Field Artillery Regiment, in McMinnville (OR)
    - Battery C, 2nd Battalion, 218th Field Artillery Regiment, in Portland (OR)
  - 741st Brigade Engineer Battalion, at Camp Withycombe (OR) (Oregon Army National Guard)
    - Headquarters and Headquarters Company, 741st Brigade Engineer Battalion, at Camp Withycombe (OR)
    - Company A (Combat Engineer), 741st Brigade Engineer Battalion, at Camp Withycombe (OR)
    - Company B (Combat Engineer), 741st Brigade Engineer Battalion, in St. Helens (OR)
    - Company C (Signal), 741st Brigade Engineer Battalion, at Camp Withycombe (OR)
    - Company D (Military Intelligence Company), 741st Brigade Engineer Battalion, at Portland Air National Guard Base (OR)
      - Detachment 1, Company D (Military Intelligence), 741st Brigade Engineer Battalion, at Pendleton Field (OR) (RQ-28A UAV)
  - 141st Brigade Support Battalion, in Portland (OR) (Oregon Army National Guard)
    - Headquarters and Headquarters Company, 141st Brigade Support Battalion, in Portland (OR)
    - Company A (Distribution), 141st Brigade Support Battalion, in Portland (OR)
    - Company B (Maintenance), 141st Brigade Support Battalion, in Portland (OR)
    - Company C (Medical), 141st Brigade Support Battalion, in Portland (OR)
    - Company D (Forward Support), 141st Brigade Support Battalion, in Montesano (WA) — attached to 1st Squadron, 303rd Cavalry Regiment (Washington Army National Guard)
    - Company E (Forward Support), 141st Brigade Support Battalion, at Camp Withycombe (OR) — attached to 741st Brigade Engineer Battalion
    - Company F (Forward Support), 141st Brigade Support Battalion, in Forest Grove (OR) — attached to 2nd Battalion, 218th Field Artillery Regiment
    - Company G (Forward Support), 141st Brigade Support Battalion, in Springfield (OR) — attached to 2nd Battalion, 162nd Infantry Regiment
    - Company H (Forward Support), 141st Brigade Support Battalion, in Medford (OR) — attached to 1st Battalion, 186th Infantry Regiment
    - Company I (Forward Support), 141st Brigade Support Battalion, in Las Cruces (NM) — attached to 1st Battalion, 200th Infantry Regiment (New Mexico Army National Guard)

== Commanders ==
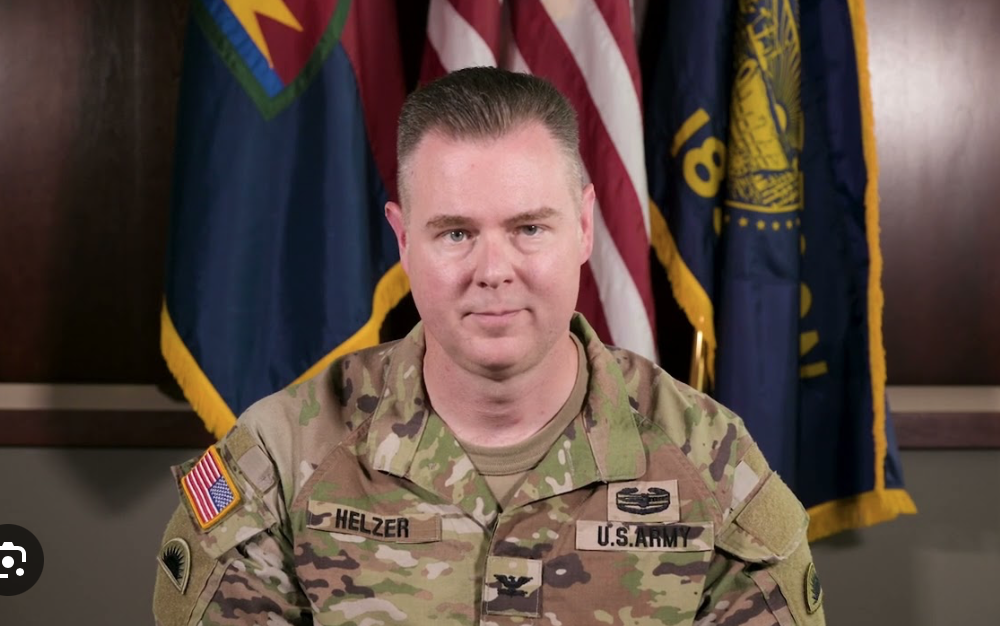
COL Peter D. Helzer Commander, 41st IBCT 2023–present

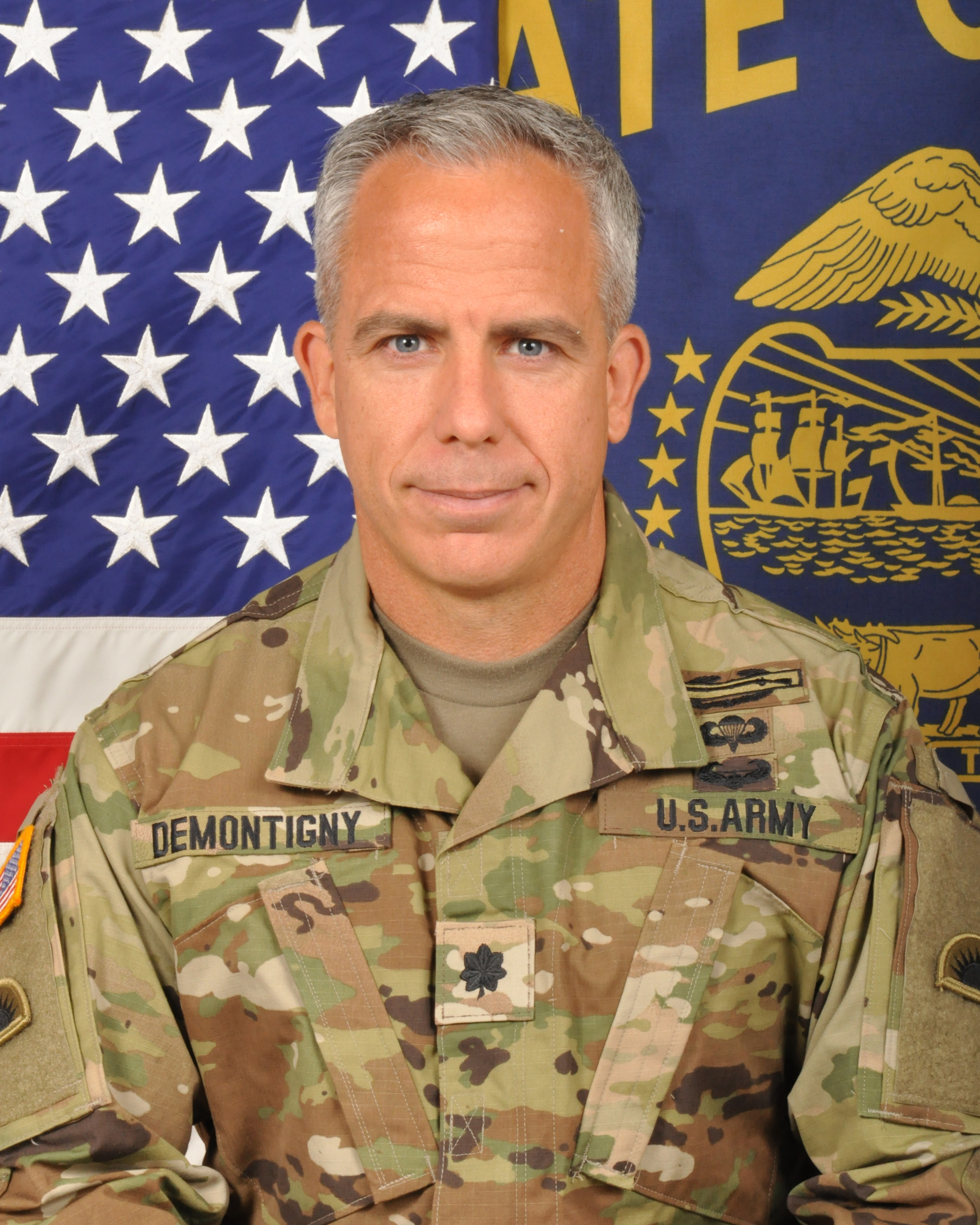
COL Philip R. Demontigny Commander, 41st IBCT 2021 - 2023

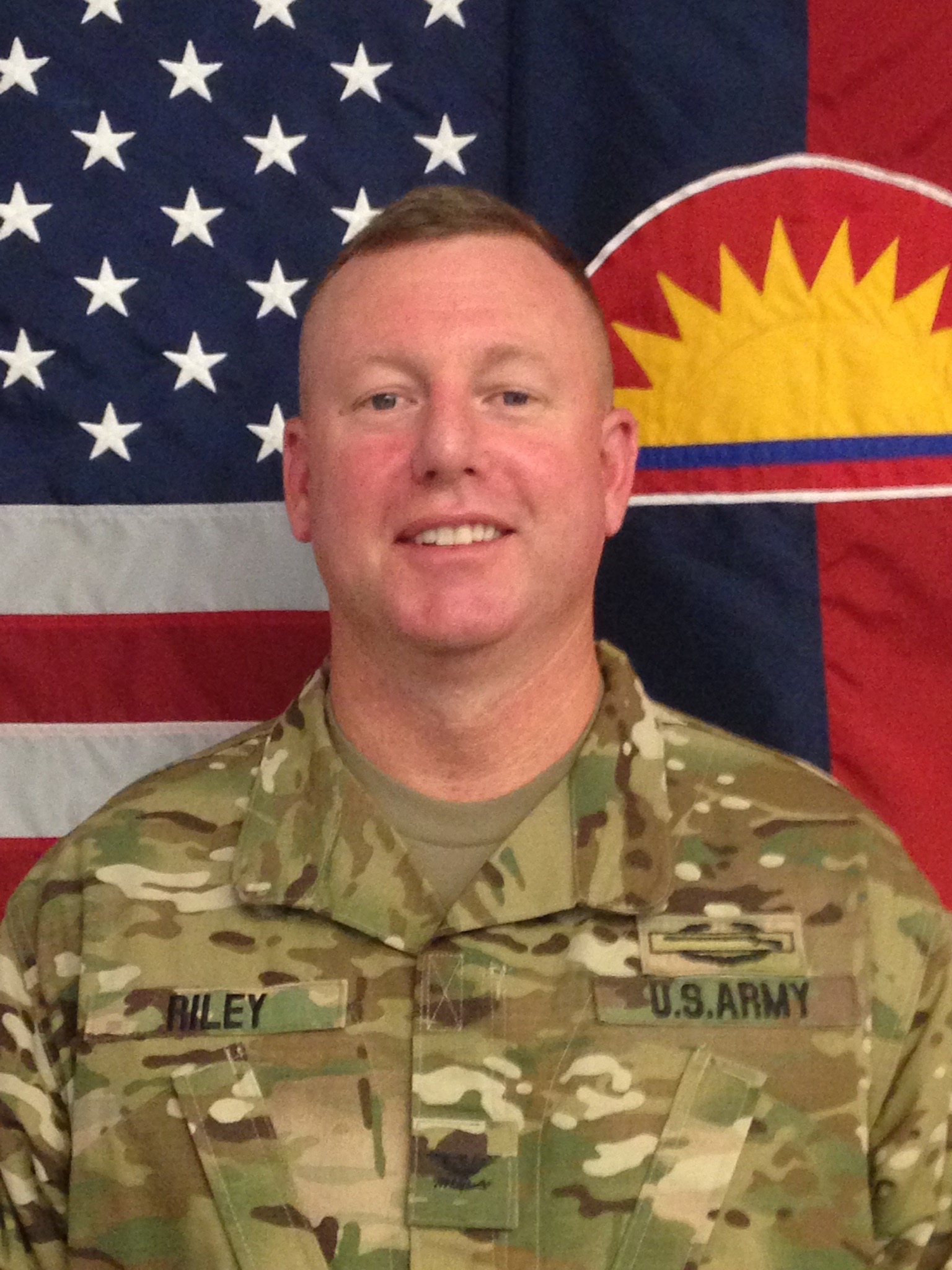
COL Eric J. Riley Commander, 41st IBCT 2017 – 2021

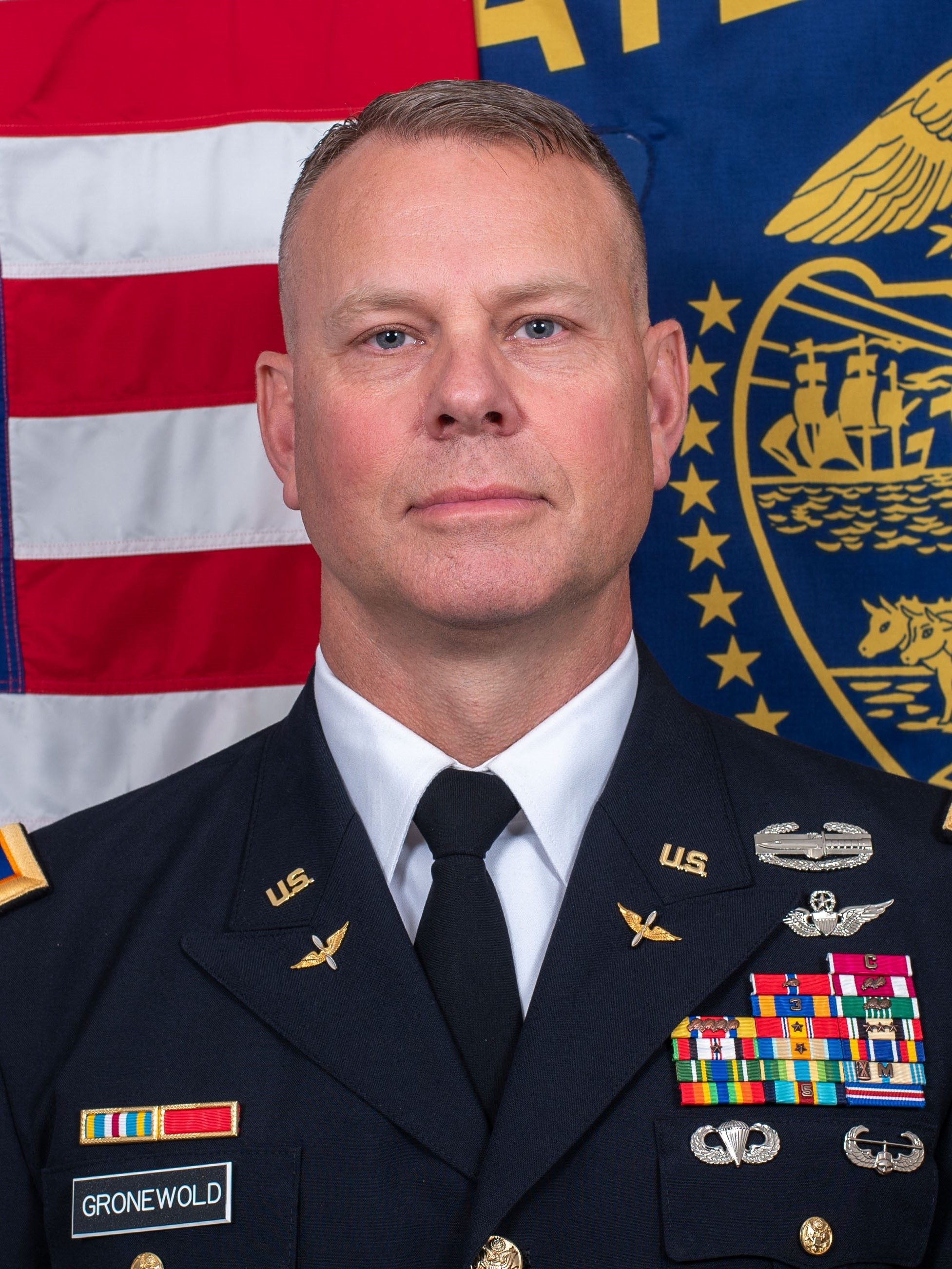
COL Alan R. Gronewold Commander, 41st IBCT 2019-2020 (Rear)

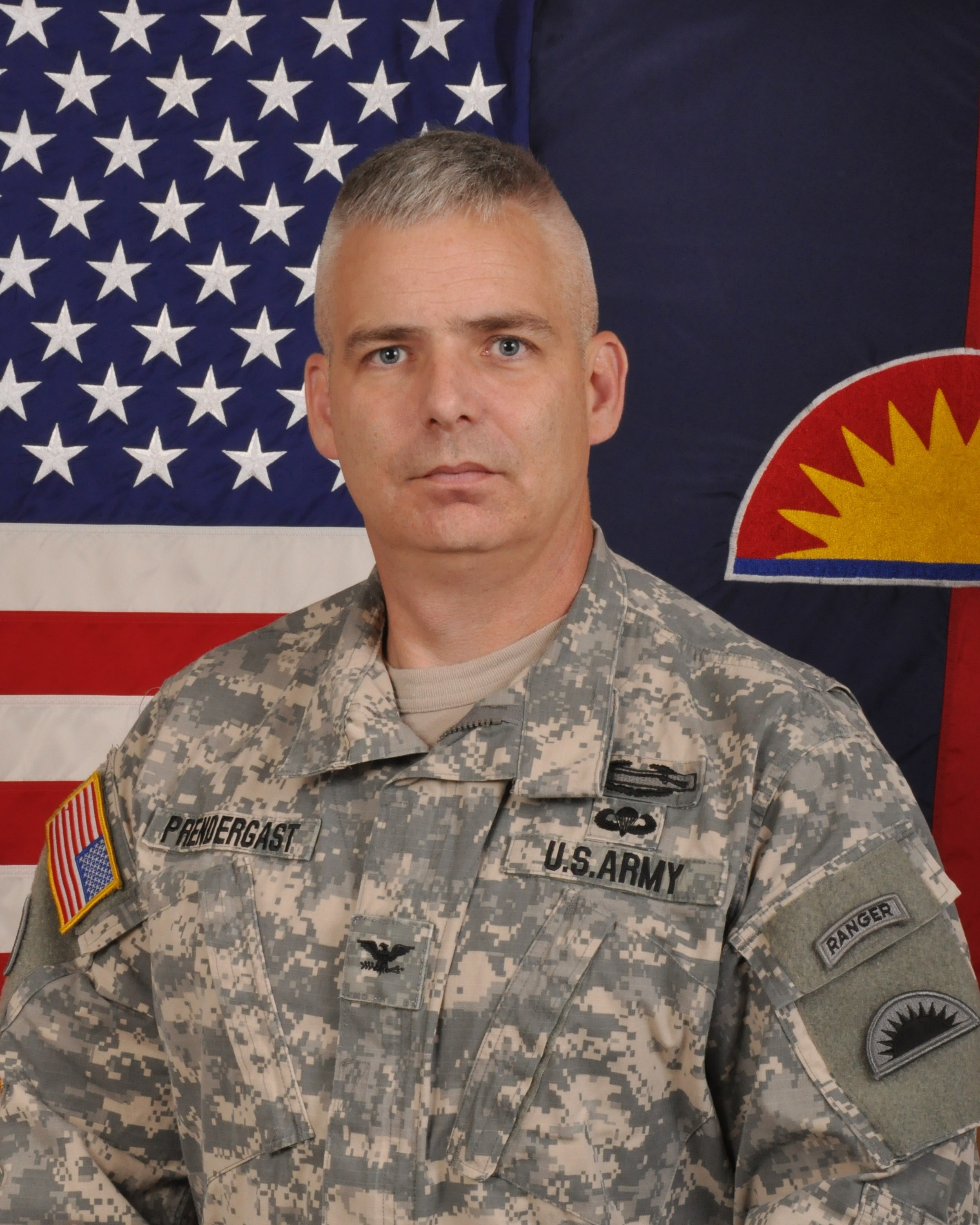
COL William J. Prendergast Commander, 41st IBCT 2014 - 2017

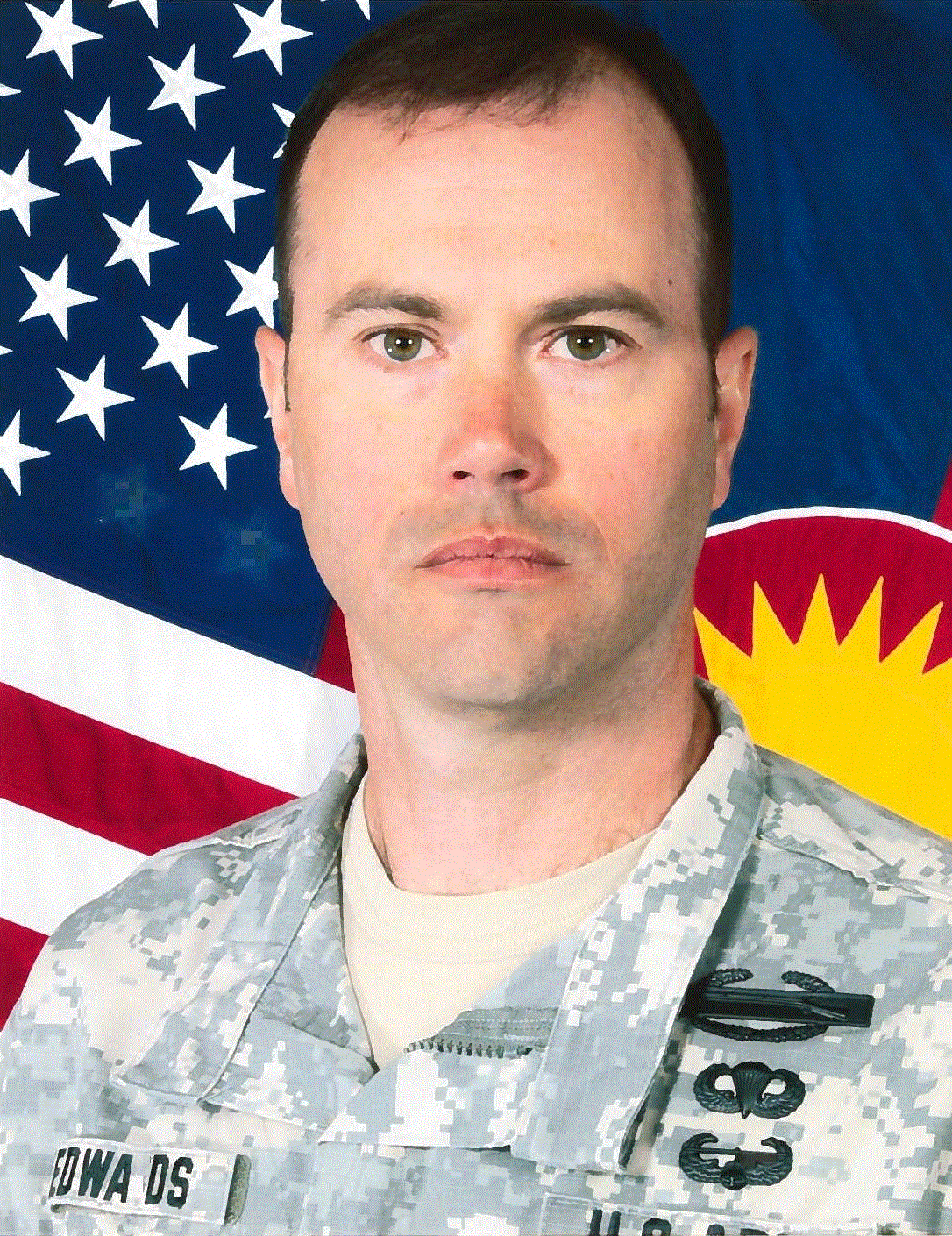
COL William J. Edwards Commander, 41st IBCT 2011 - 2014

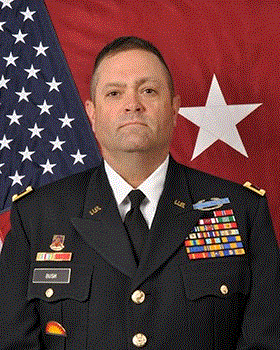
COL Eric C. Bush Commander, 41st IBCT 2010 - 2011

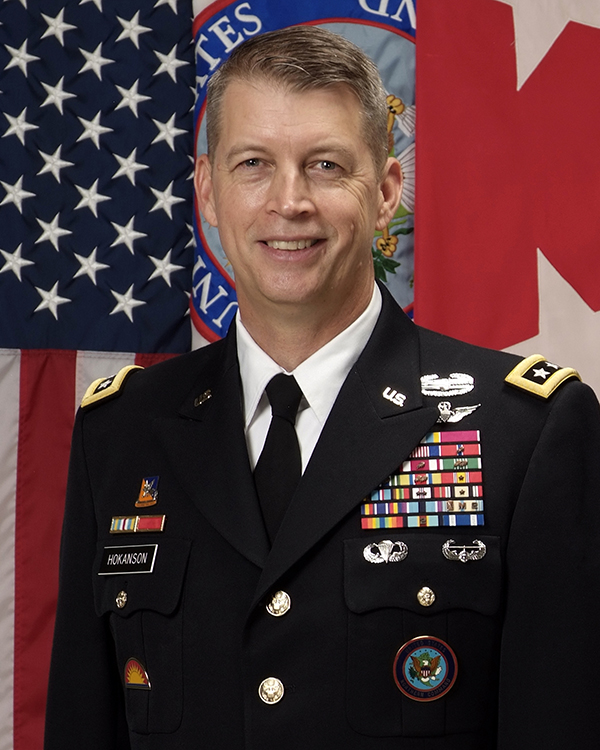
COL Daniel R. Hokanson Commander, 41st IBCT 2008 - 2010

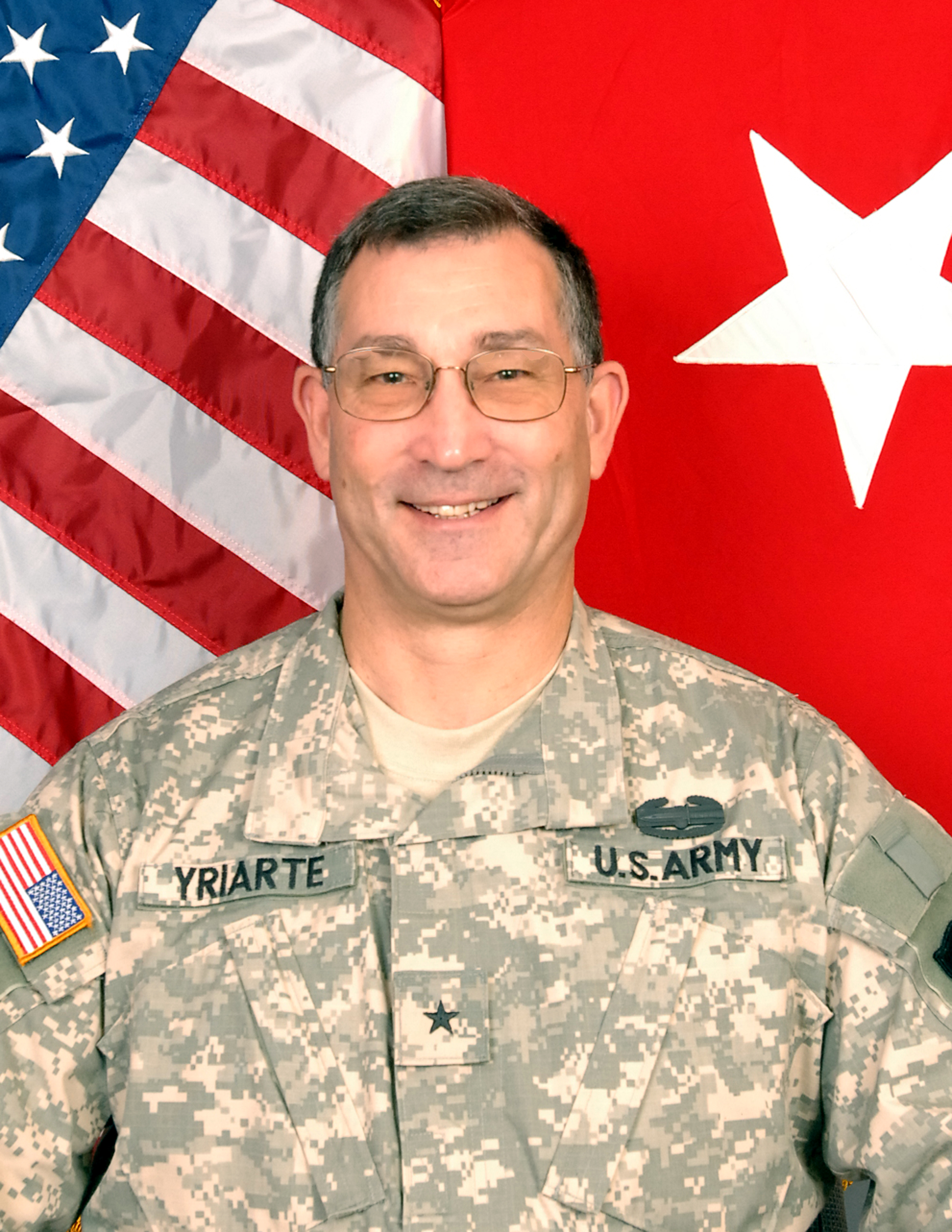
BG Charles L. Yriarte Commander, 41st IBCT 2009 - 2010 (Rear)

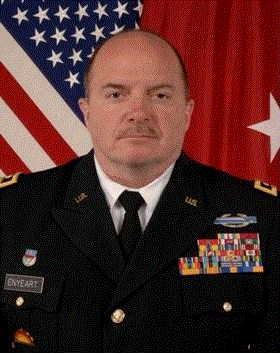
COL David B. Enyeart Commander, 41st IBCT 2007 - 2008

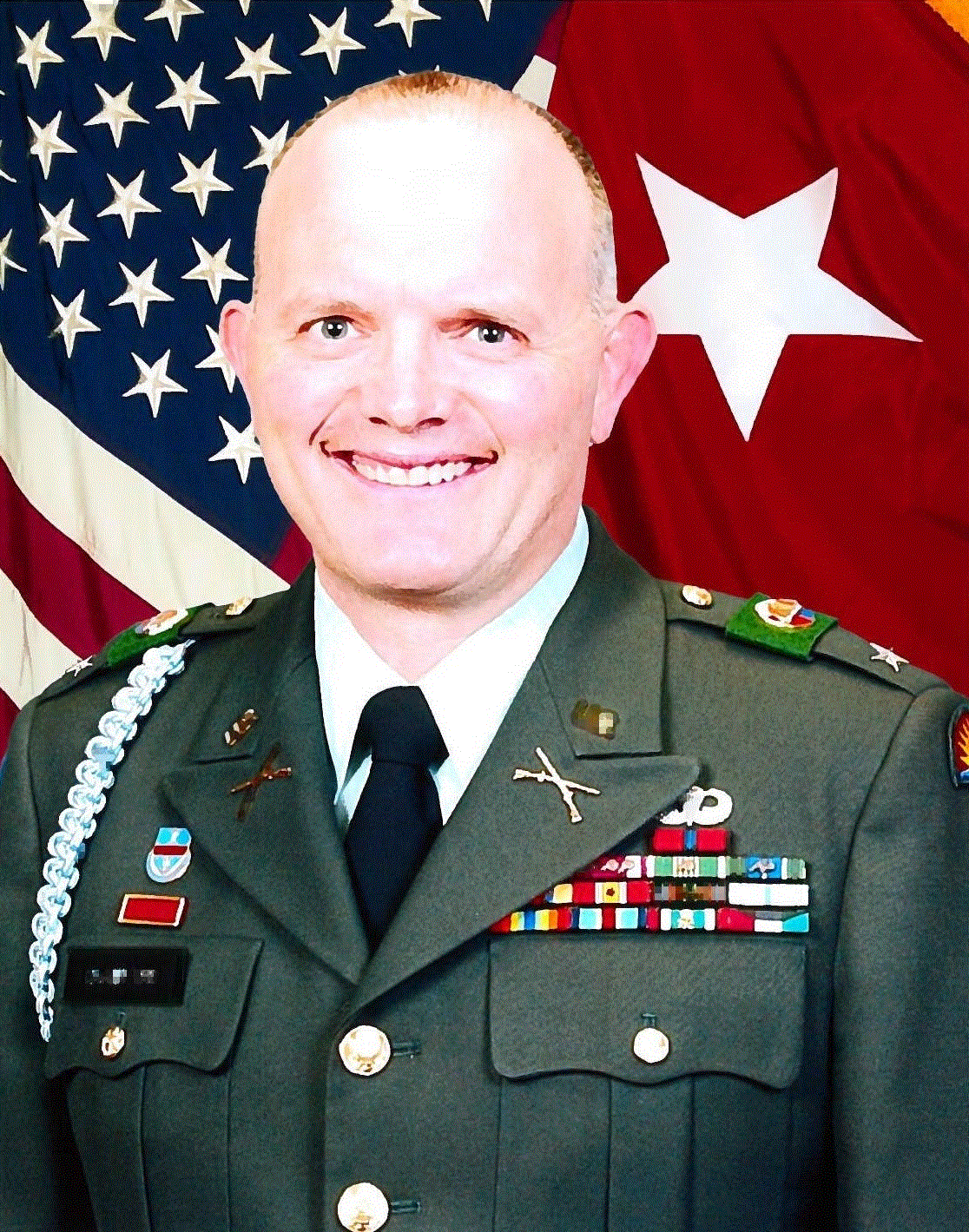
COL Cameron A. Crawford Commander, 41st IB 2006 - 2007

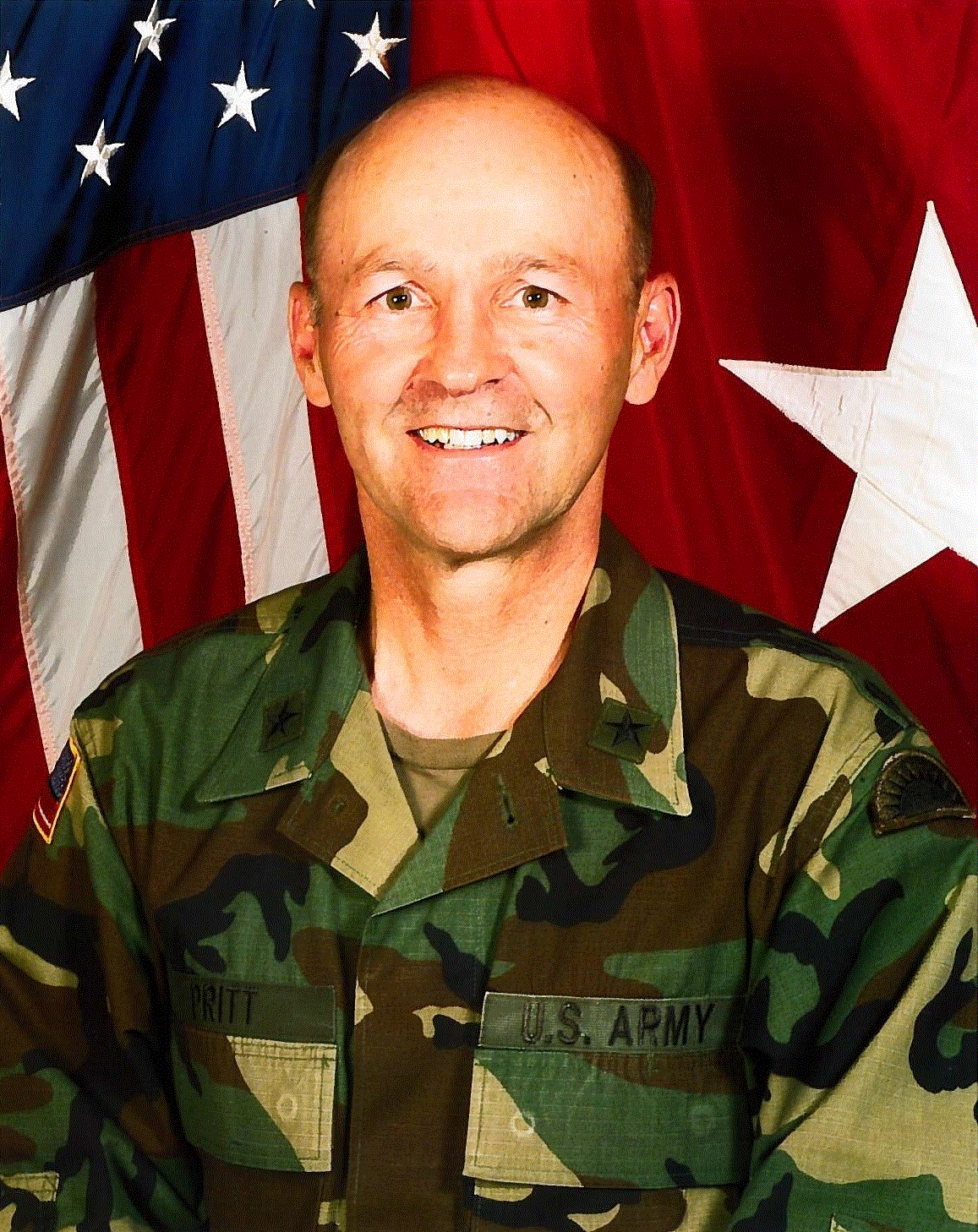
BG Douglas A. Pritt Commander, 41st IB 2003 - 2006

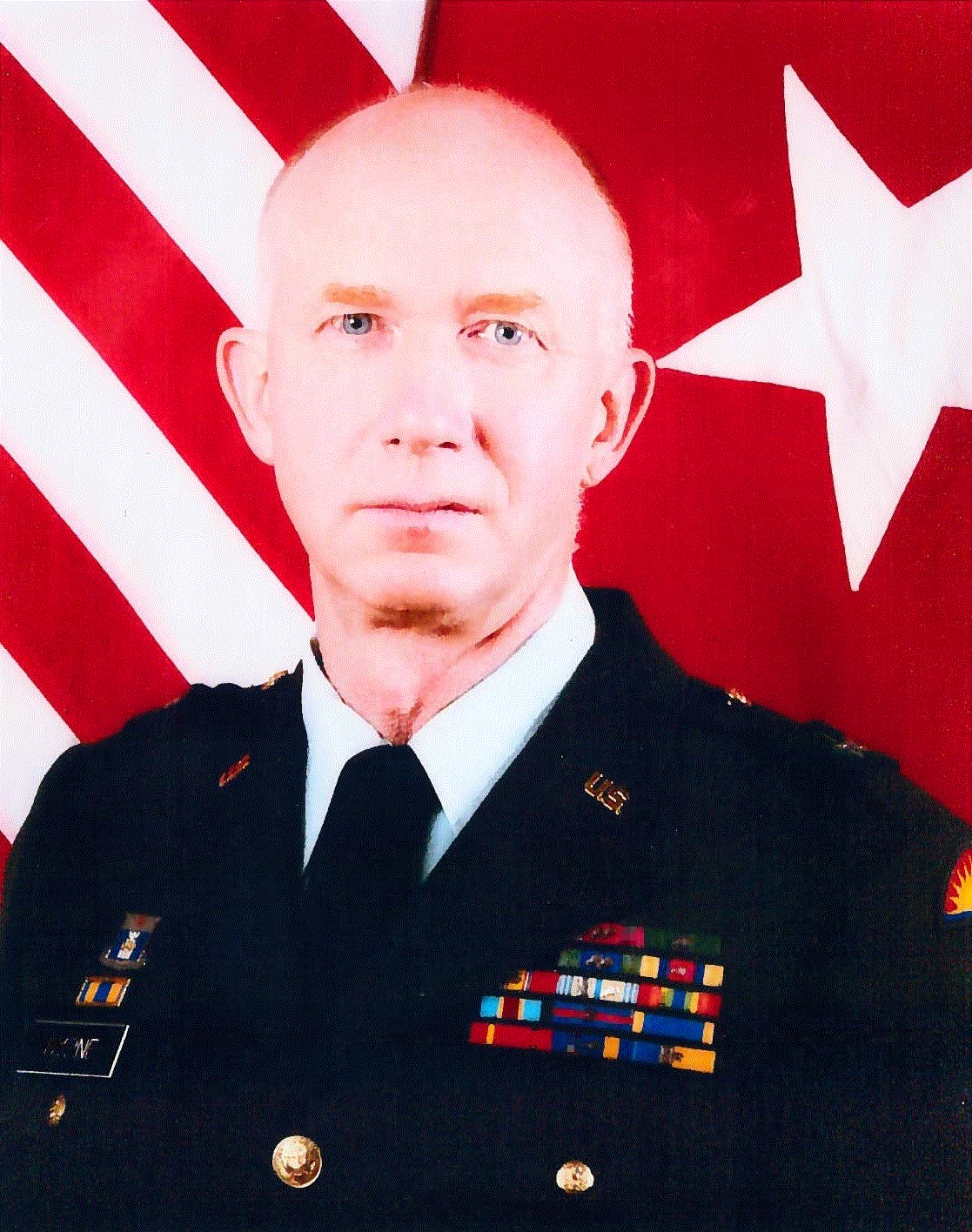
BG Raymond C, Byrne Jr. Commander, 41st IB 1998 - 2003

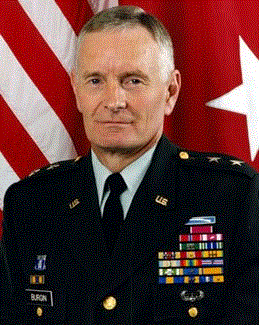
BG Alexander H. Burgin Commander, 41st IB 1993 - 1998

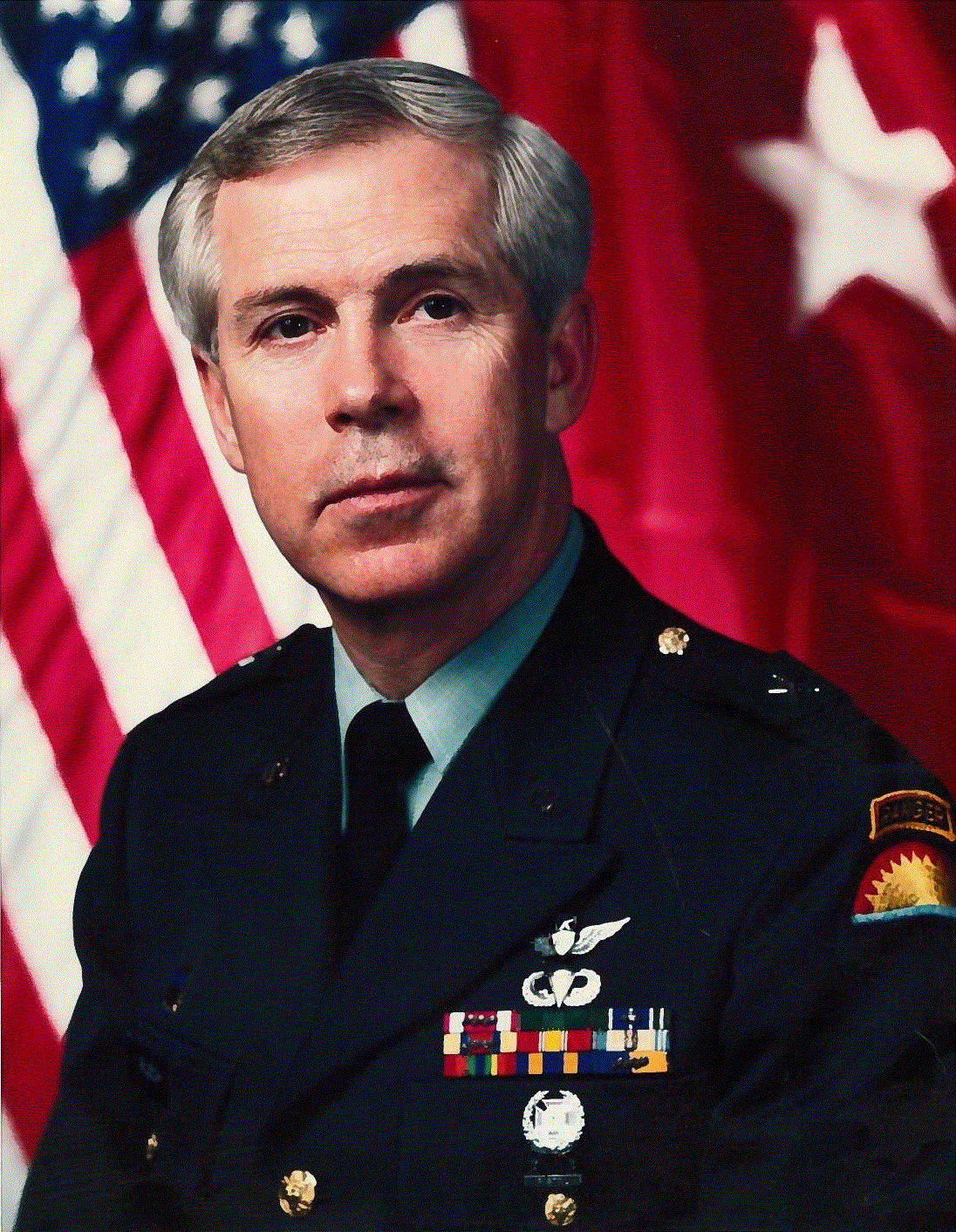
BG Richard Rusch Commander, 41st IB 1990 - 1993

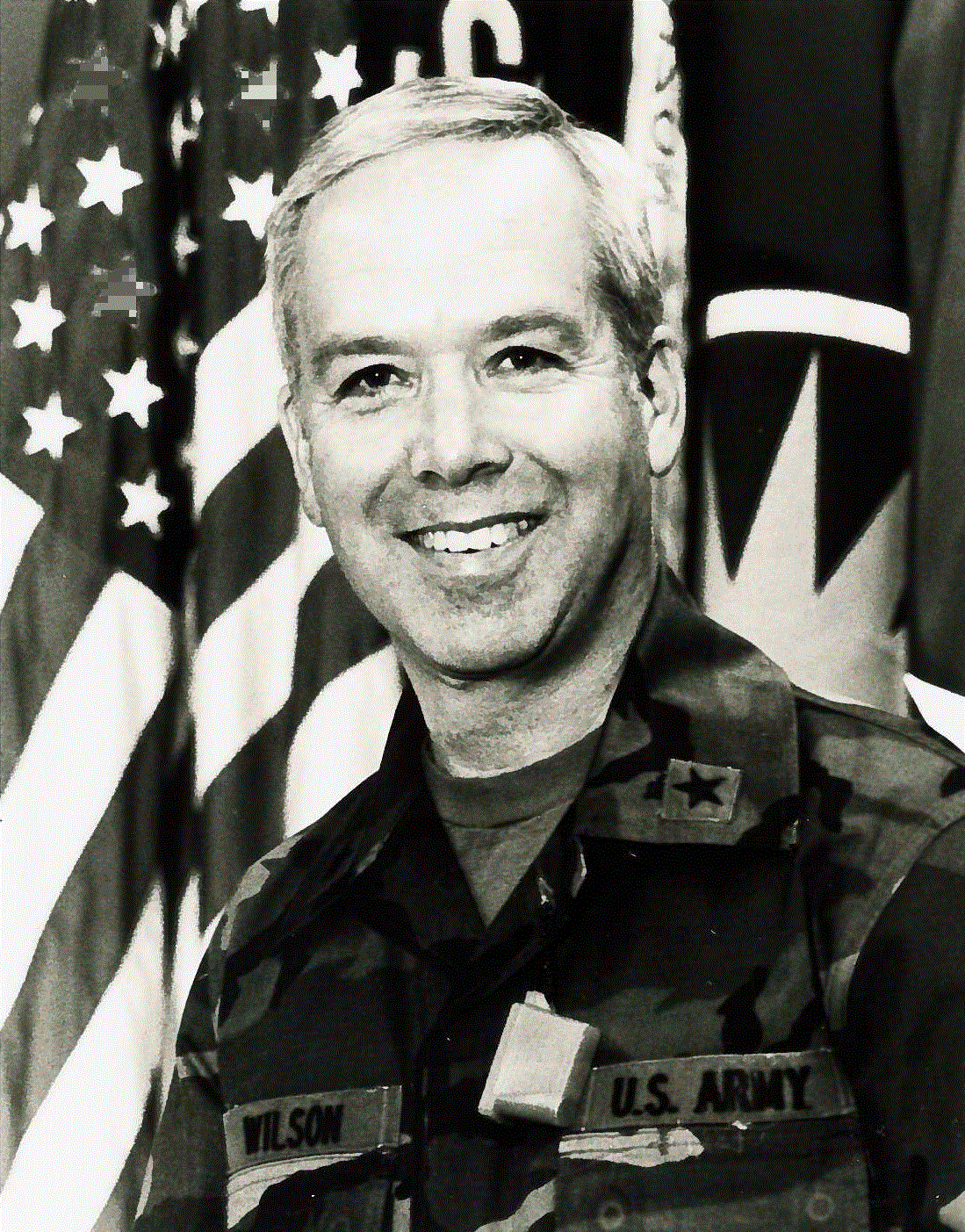
BG Robert Wilson Commander, 41st IB 1988 - 1990

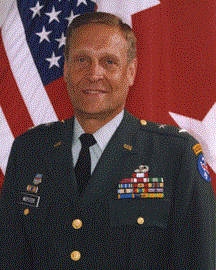
MG Jan P. Wepster Commander, 41st IB 1986 - 1988

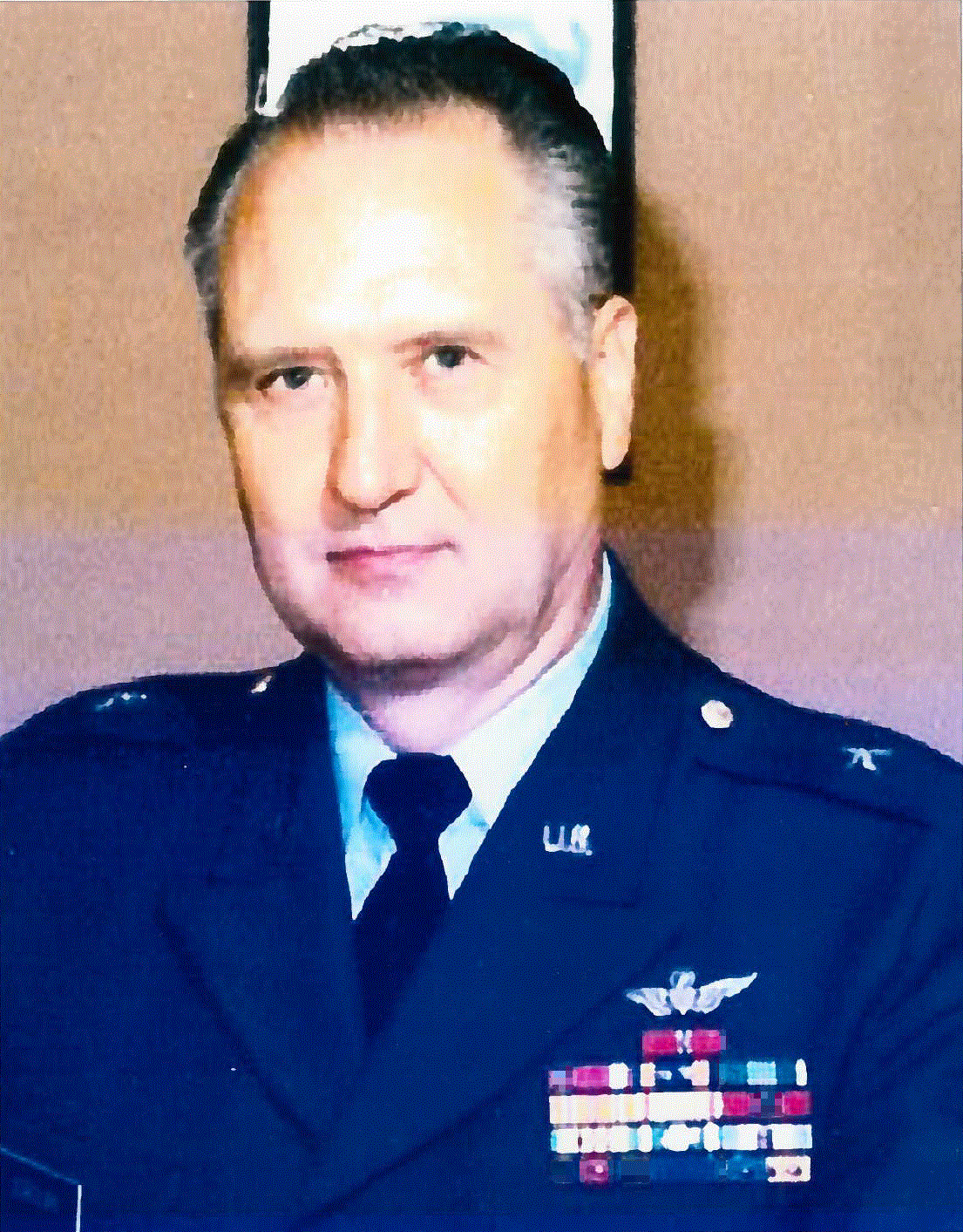
BG Ervin T. Osbourn Commander, 41st IB 1982 - 1986

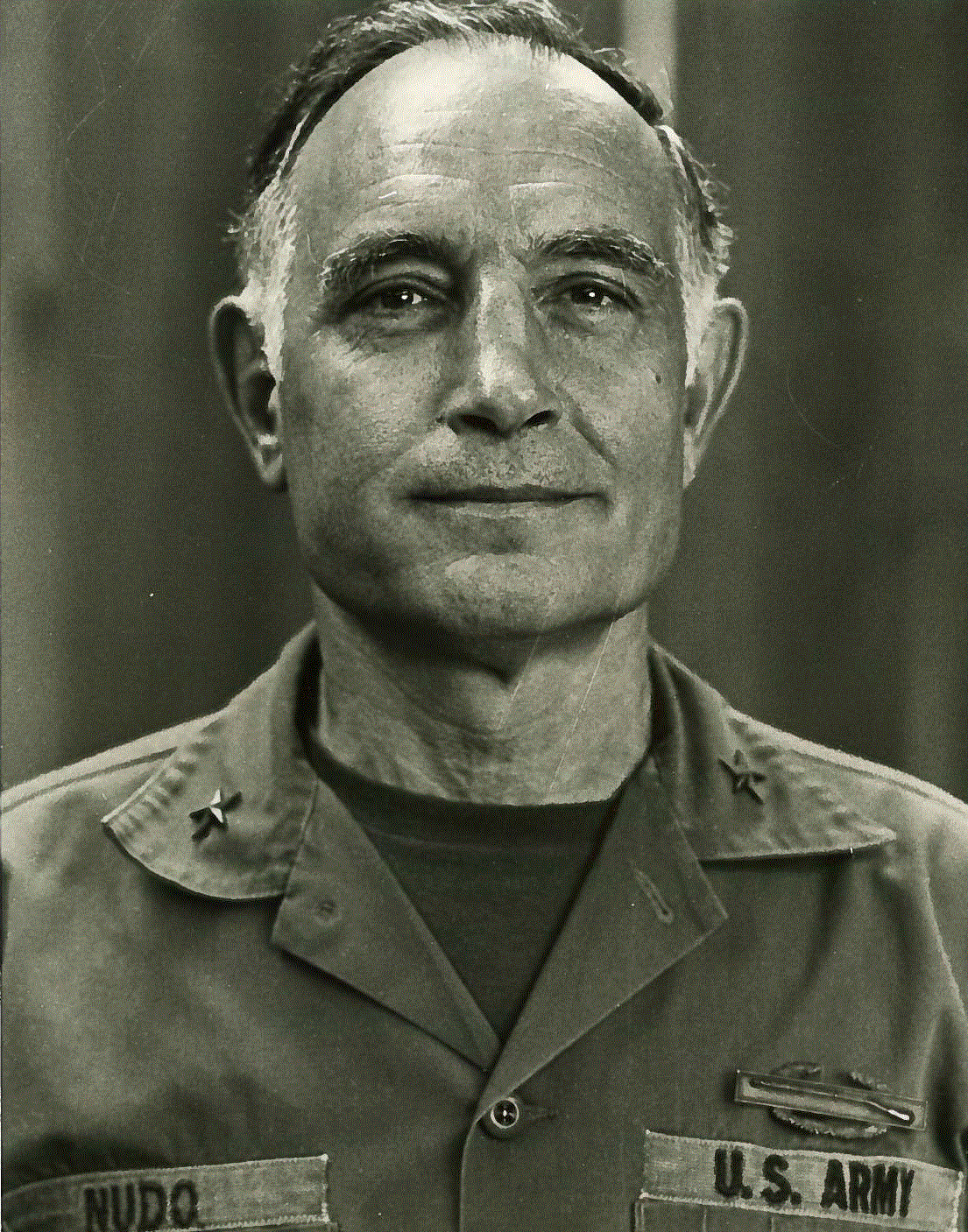
BG David L. Nudo Commander, 41st IB 1979 - 1982

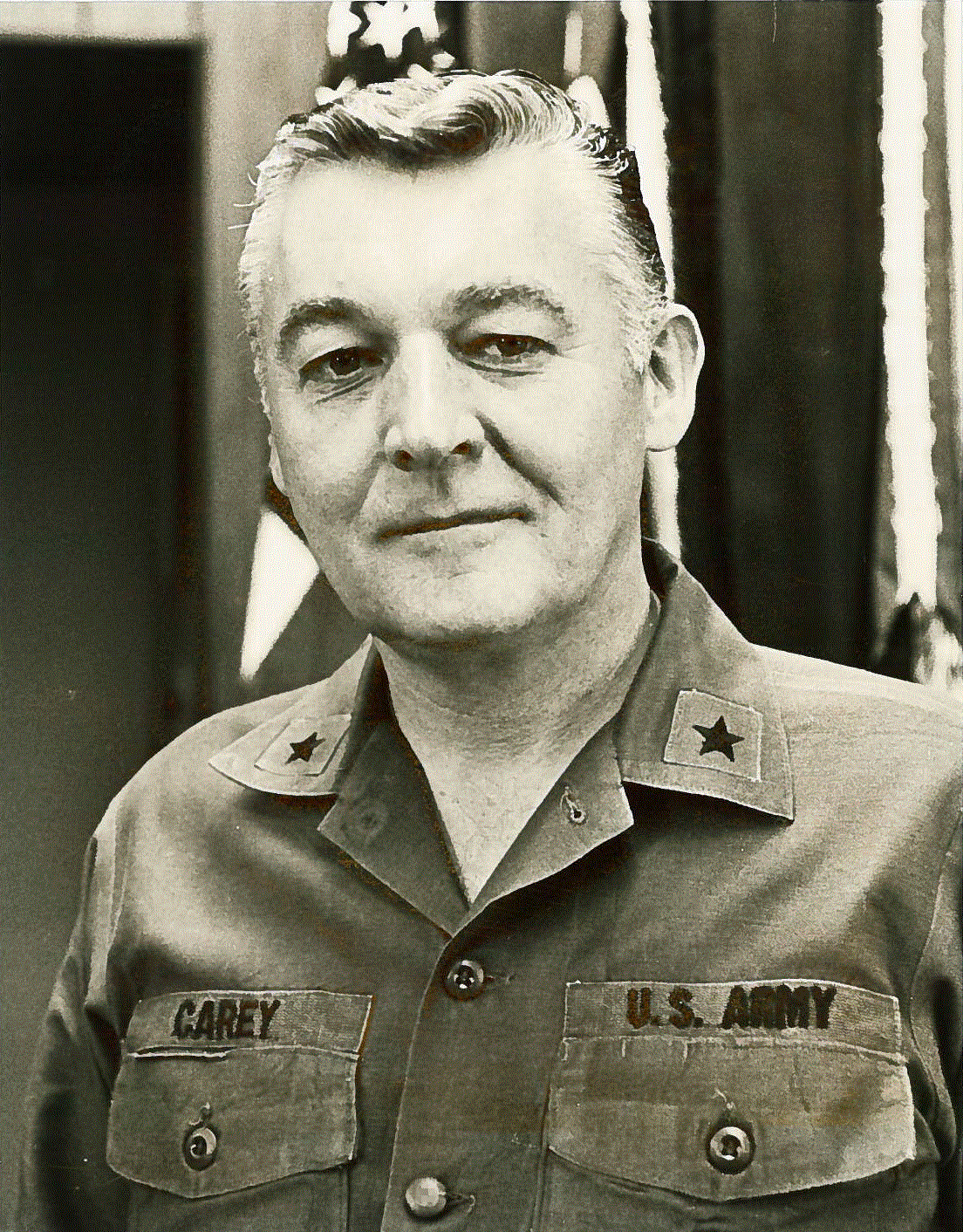
BG Willard K. Carey Commander, 41st IB 1973 - 1974 & 1977 - 1978

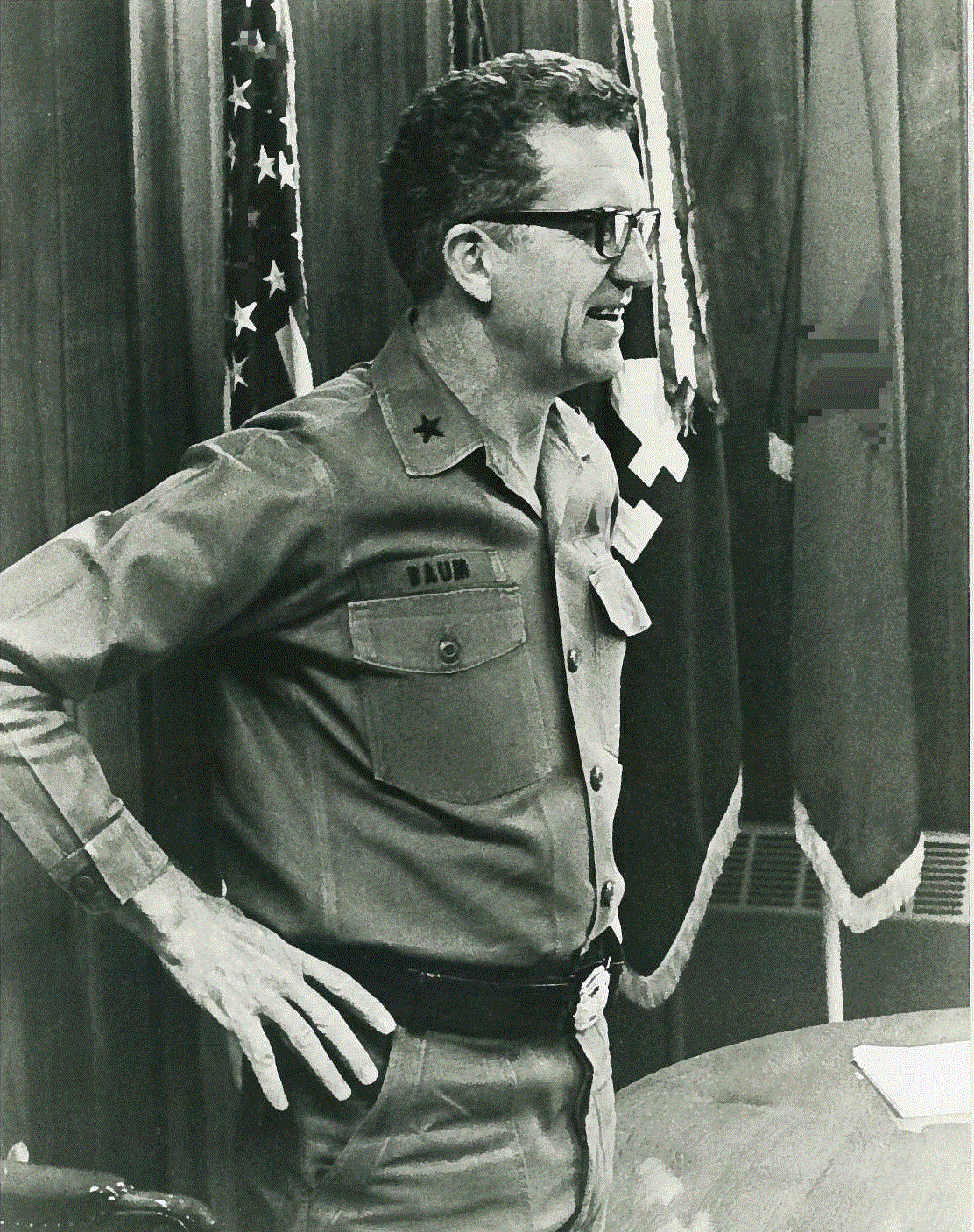
BG Richard K. Baum Commander, 41st IB 1974 - 1977

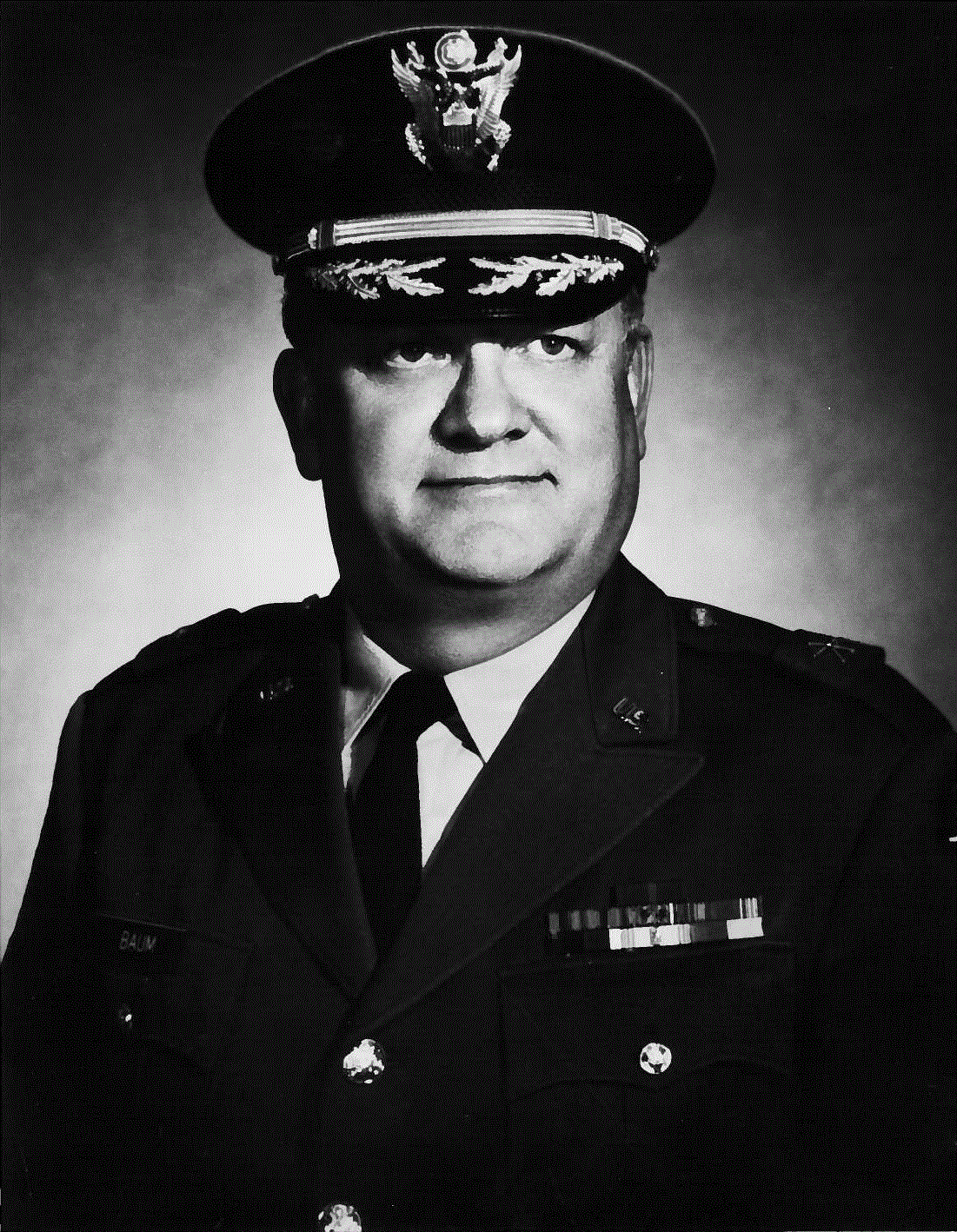
BG David C. Baum Commander, 41st IB 1965 - 1973
