= Billy Edwards (rugby union) =

Northern Irish rugby union player (1887–1917)

- Full name: William Victor Edwards
- Born: 16 October 1887 Strandtown, Belfast, Ireland
- Died: 29 December 1917 (aged 30) near Deir Ibzi, Palestine
- School: Coleraine Academical Institution; Campbell College
- University: Queen's University Belfast
- Occupation: Chartered accountant

Rugby union career
- Position: Forward
International career
Years	Team	Apps	(Points)
1912	Ireland	2	(0)

William Victor Edwards (16 October 1887 — 29 December 1917) was an Irish international rugby union player.

== Biography ==
The son of a merchant, Edwards was born in Strandtown, Belfast. He attended Coleraine Academical Institution, Campbell College and Queen's University Belfast, where he studied to be an accountant.

Edwards played his rugby for Belfast clubs Knock and Malone. A forward, Edwards represented Ulster and was capped twice for Ireland in the 1912 Five Nations, against France in Paris and England at Twickenham.

During his youth, Edwards also excelled in aquatic sports, winning the Irish 220 yards swimming championship title in 1912, as well as representing Ireland as a water polo player. He had the distinction of being the first person to swim across the Belfast Lough, a feat he achieved on 16 August 1913, clocked at a little over four hours.

Edwards was commissioned as a second lieutenant to the 7th Battalion, Royal Irish Fusiliers, in late 1914. Posted to Tipperary, Edwards was promoted to captain the following year and in February 1916 got sent to France. He suffered the effects of being gassed while on the Western Front and also received a head wound in the Battle of Ginchy. After being transferred to the Royal Dublin Fusiliers, Edwards got posted to the Middle East and was killed in action on 29 December 1917 during the Battle of Jerusalem.

== See also ==
- List of Ireland national rugby union players
