= Patrick Rogan (Medal of Honor) =

Patrick Rogan (c. 1847 – December 17, 1912) was an Irish-American US Army soldier who received the Medal of Honor for his actions during the Indian Wars. He was born in County Leitrim, Ireland.

Shortly after immigrating to the United States, Rogan was paid $625 to be a substitute for a man recently called up for the draft. He enlisted in the army in February 1865, serving during the final months of the American Civil War. He was discharged from the army the following July, but reenlisted almost a year later in 1866, joining the 7th US Infantry.

During his first enlistment, Rogan married Margaret McLennon, who was the sister of future MOH recipient John McLennon (who received the medal for the same action as Rogan). By the end of his first enlistment in 1870, he had already been promoted to the rank of sergeant. During his second enlistment, he served with his brother-in-law under colonel John Gibbon in the Nez Perce War. By the end of fifth enlistment in 1889, he had finally been promoted to the rank of first sergeant. He retired from the army in September 1895.

Following his retirement, Rogan was employed as a night watchman for the Union Pacific Coal Company. He died in Rock Springs, Wyoming, and was buried beside his wife and brother-in-law McLennon.

== Medal of Honor citation ==
Rank and organization: Sergeant, Company A, 7th U.S. Infantry. Place and date: At Big Hole, Mont., 9 August 1877. Entered service at: ------. Birth: Ireland. Date of issue: 2 December 1878.

Verified and reported the company while subjected to a galling fire from the enemy.
