= Horace H. Fuller =

United States Army general

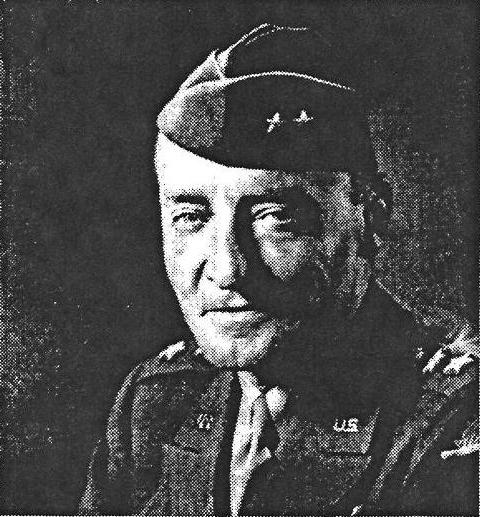
- Major General Horace H. Fuller
- Born: August 10, 1886; Fort Meade, South Dakota
- Died: September 18, 1966 (aged 80)
- Military career
- Allegiance: United States
- Branch: United States Army
- Service years: 1909–1946
- Rank: Major General
- Service number: 0-2616
- Units: Cavalry Branch; Field Artillery Branch
- Commands: 41st Infantry Division of the United States Army
- Conflicts: World War I: Meuse–Argonne offensive; Battle of the Sambre; World War II; Operation Cartwheel; Salamaua-Lae campaign; Western New Guinea campaign; Battle of Hollandia; Landing at Aitape; Battle of Biak; Burma campaign
- Awards: Army Distinguished Service Medal; Silver Star; Legion of Merit

Major General Horace H. Fuller (August 10, 1886 – September 18, 1966) was an American soldier and general in the first half of the 20th century. He is best known for his command of the 41st Infantry Division in the South West Pacific Area during World War II.

== Education and early life ==
Horace Hayes Fuller was born on August 10, 1886, in Fort Meade, South Dakota, the son of Major Ezra B. Fuller. He was appointed to the United States Military Academy at West Point – where his father had graduated with the class of 1873 – by President Theodore Roosevelt in 1904. He graduated 59th in the class of 1909, a distinguished class that also included future generals George S. Patton (46), Jacob L. Devers (39), John C. H. Lee (12), Edwin F. Harding (74), Robert L. Eichelberger (68), and William H. Simpson (101). He was commissioned as a Second Lieutenant in the 11th Cavalry. He was stationed with the 11th Cavalry at Fort Oglethorpe until April 1914 when he transferred to the 7th Cavalry which was then based at Fort William McKinley. He remained in the Philippines until 1916, transferring to the 8th Cavalry. He was promoted to First Lieutenant on June 12, 1916. He transferred to the field artillery on July 1, 1916, but returned to United States to serve with the 17th Cavalry at Fort Bliss. He was promoted to captain on May 15, 1917.

== Great War ==
Fuller transferred to the 11th Field Artillery in July 1917, and attended a course of instruction at Fort Sill. He was promoted to temporary Major on January 8, 1918. He sailed for France in October 1918 and joined the 108th Field Artillery at Véronnes. He participated in the Meuse–Argonne offensive and commanded the 108th Field Artillery in the Battle of the Sambre, earning promotion to temporary Lieutenant Colonel on September 11, 1918. He commanded the 109th Field Artillery until March 1919 and then served with the Motor Transport Corps and Graves Registration Service.

== Interwar years ==
Fuller reverted to his permanent rank of captain on April 15, 1920, but was promoted to major on July 1, 1920. On returning to the United States he was posted to the 83rd Field Artillery at Fort Benning. He attended the United States Army Command General Staff College at Fort Leavenworth from 1922 to 1923 and, a distinguished graduate, stayed on as an instructor until 1927, when he left to attend the Army War College. Regimental duty followed with the 76th Field Artillery at the Presidio of Monterey, California but he returned to Washington, D.C., in 1929 for duty on the War Department General Staff. In 1933 he was posted to the 6th Field Artillery at Fort Hoyle, Maryland. He was finally promoted to lieutenant colonel on May 1, 1934.

After attending a chemical warfare course at Edgewood Arsenal, Maryland, Fuller was posted to Paris as military attaché to France. He remained there until August 1940, watching the Fall of France first hand. While there he was promoted to colonel on July 1, 1938.

== World War II ==
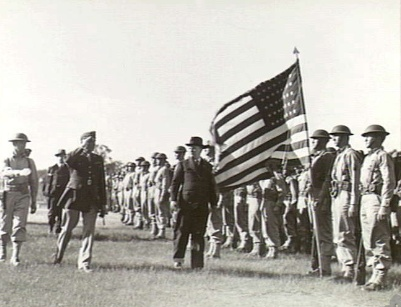
Recently arrived troops of the 41st Infantry Division are reviewed by Australian Army Minister Frank Forde on April 14, 1942, accompanied by Major General Horace H. Fuller. Note the World War I style M1917A1 Steel helmets.

On returning to the United States, Fuller attended a refresher course at Fort Sill before being posted to command the artillery of the 3rd Infantry Division at Fort Lewis. As such, he was promoted to the temporary rank of brigadier general on October 1, 1940.

Fuller returned to the Command and General Staff College as its commandant in June 1941, but, in December 1941, following the sudden death of Major General George A. White, he became commander of the 41st Infantry Division and was promoted to the temporary rank of major general on December 15, 1941. That same month saw the United States officially enter World War II.

Fuller led the 41st Infantry Division in the attacks on Salamaua, Hollandia, and Biak. At Biak, tenacious defence by well-dug-in Japanese defenders frustrated his attempt to rapidly secure the island. Running afoul of General Douglas MacArthur's need to have the island secured quickly, Fuller found himself superseded in command at Biak by Lieutenant General Robert L. Eichelberger, a West Point classmate. In June 1944, Fuller asked to be relieved of his command, becoming the only divisional commander to be relieved in the Western New Guinea campaign.

Brigadier General Jens A. Doe, formerly the assistant division commander (ADC) of the 41st, took over command of the division and remained in command for the rest of the war. Fuller became commander of the U.S. Army Forces Far East in August 1944. In November he became deputy chief of staff at South East Asia Command.

== Later life ==
Fuller retired from the army in August 1946 and died on September 18, 1966.

== Awards ==
- Army Distinguished Service Medal
- Mexican Border Service Medal
- World War I Victory Medal with "Meuse-Argonne" campaign clasp
- American Defense Service Medal with "Foreign Service" clasp
- Asiatic-Pacific Campaign Medal with two campaign stars
- World War II Victory Medal

Distinguished Service Medal citation:

For service in the Southwest Pacific from 6 April 1942 to 17 June 1944. Commanding one of the first infantry divisions to arrive in the theater, he demonstrated exceptional ability and sound judgement in bringing his division to a high standards of efficiency in preparation for jungle combat. He successfully commanded his division in the defense of the Oro bay-Gona area and in operations against the enemy from Gona to Morobe, while elements of his division participated in the landing at Nassau Bay and the subsequent drive on Salamaua. Later he led his division in the amphibious assaults against Hollandia and Biak Island. Elements of his division made the successful landing at Aitape and in the Wakde Island-Sarmi area. In all his attacks he inflicted decisive defeat on an experienced enemy. His personal courage and inspiring leadership made possible the able expedition of assigned missions, and contributed materially to our success in dislodging the enemy and forcing him to relinquish his conquests.

== Notes ==
Military offices
Preceded by Converse R. Lewis	Commandant of the United States Army Command and General Staff College; June–November 1941	Succeeded by Edmund L. Gruber
Preceded by George A. White	Commanding General 41st Infantry Division; 1941–1944	Succeeded by Jens A. Doe
