= 41st Infantry Division (United States) =

- 41st Infantry Division shoulder sleeve insignia
- Active: 18 July 1917–22 February 1919; 3 January 1930–31 December 1945; 26 February 1947–1 March 1968; became 41st Infantry Brigade
- Country: United States
- Branch: United States Army
- Role: Infantry
- Size: Division
- Nickname: "Jungleers" or "Sunsetters"
- Engagements: World War I; World War II; Papua; New Guinea; Southern Philippines

Commanders
- Notable commanders: Major General George A. White; Major General Horace H. Fuller; Major General Jens A. Doe

Insignia
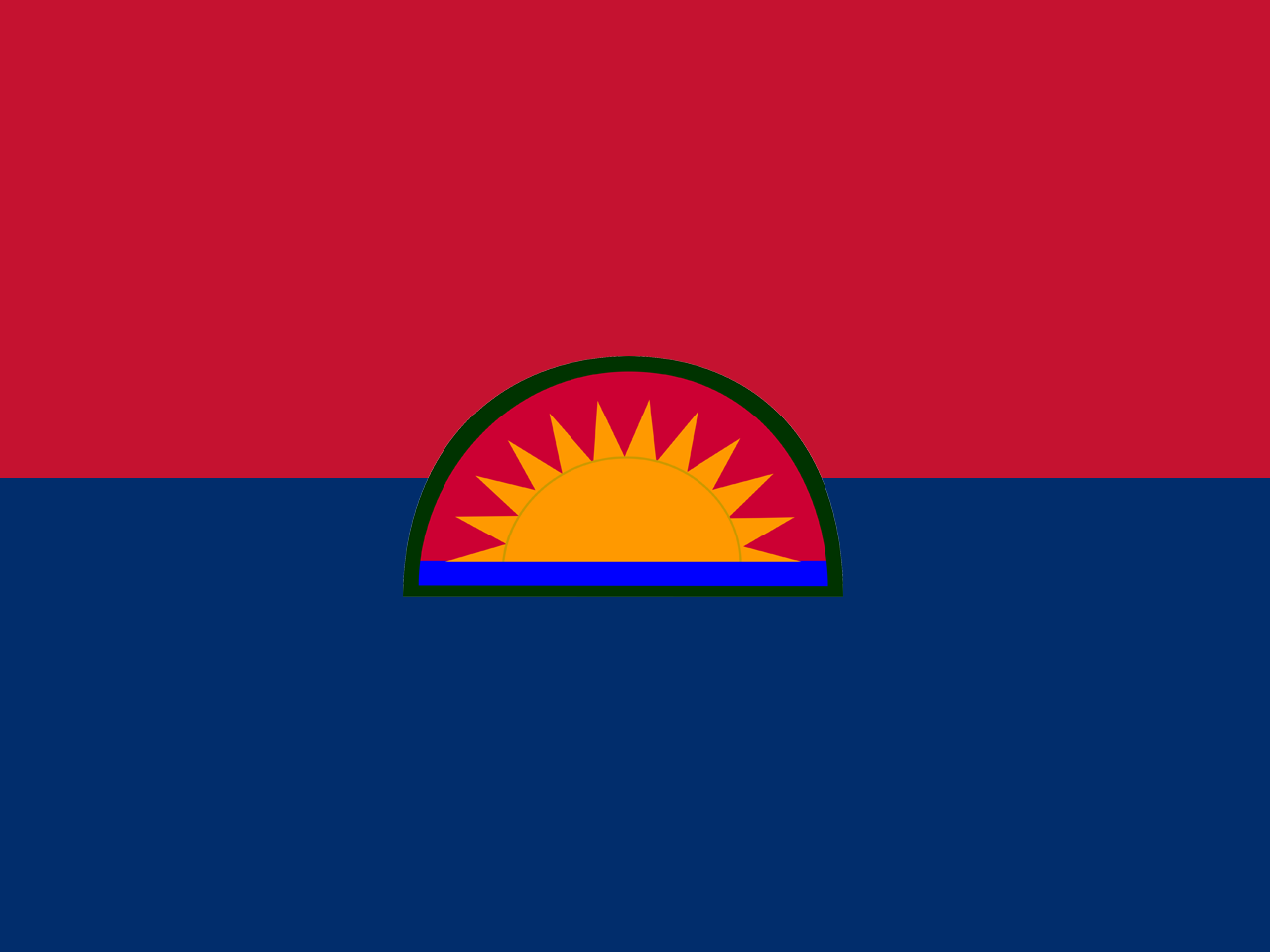
- Flag of the United States Army 41st Infantry Division

The 41st Infantry Division was an infantry division of the United States Army National Guard composed primarily of units from the Pacific Northwest. The division saw active service in World War I and World War II, receiving the nickname “Jungleers” during the latter.

Organized in 1917 after the American entry into World War I, the division was selected as a replacement division after being deployed to France as part of the American Expeditionary Forces. Its infantry units were used to provide individual replacements and the division functioned as a replacement depot. The 41st Division was reorganized in the National Guard during the interwar period, consisting of units from Oregon, Washington, Montana, Idaho and Wyoming. Sent to Australia after the Attack on Pearl Harbor, the 41st became one of the first Army units to engage in offensive ground combat operations during World War II when elements of the division were committed to the New Guinea campaign in the last months of 1942. The division suffered its heaviest casualties in the 1944 Battle of Biak at the conclusion of the campaign. In the final months of the war, the division took a major role in the liberation of the Southern Philippines, including the Palawan, Zamboanga, Eastern Mindanao and Sulu Archipelago operations. The division ended its active service in the occupation of Japan.

Postwar, the 41st Infantry Division was re-established in the National Guard, split between Oregon and Washington. The 41st Infantry Brigade was formed from mainly Oregon elements of the division in 1965 and in 1968 the division was eliminated during reductions of the National Guard. Its former units were used to form two separate brigades, the 41st Infantry Brigade in Oregon, and the 81st Infantry Brigade in Washington.

== History ==
=== World War I ===
The 41st was ordered to be organized by the War Department on 18 July 1917, about three months after the American entry into World War I, from National Guard units from Idaho, Montana, Oregon, Washington state, and Wyoming. Additional units from Colorado, New Mexico, North Dakota, South Dakota, and the District of Columbia were later added to complete the division. It trained at Camp Greene, North Carolina. It consisted of the 81st Infantry Brigade (161st and 162nd Infantry Regiments) and the 82nd Infantry Brigade (163rd and 164th Infantry Regiments). On 26 November 1917 the 41st Division embarked for Europe as part of the American Expeditionary Force (AEF), commanded by General John J. Pershing. Men of the 41st were aboard the SS Tuscania when it was torpedoed by a German U-boat and sunk off the coast of Northern Ireland.

==== Order of battle ====
- Headquarters, 41st Division
- 81st Infantry Brigade
  - 161st Infantry Regiment (former 2nd Washington Infantry and Companies A, B, C, and D, 3rd D.C. Infantry)
  - 162nd Infantry Regiment (former 3rd Oregon Infantry and Companies E, F, G, and H, 3rd D.C. Infantry)
  - 147th Machine Gun Battalion (former Machine Gun Company, 3rd D.C. Infantry, Machine Gun Troop, Washington Cavalry, Company H, 2nd North Dakota Infantry, and Machine Gun Company, 2nd Idaho Infantry)
- 82nd Infantry Brigade
  - 163rd Infantry Regiment (former 2nd Montana Infantry and Companies I, K, L, and M, 3rd D.C. Infantry)
  - 164th Infantry Regiment (former 2nd North Dakota Infantry, 1st Battalion and Machine Gun Company, 1st North Dakota Infantry, and 64 men from Headquarters Company, 3rd D.C. Infantry)
  - 148th Machine Gun Battalion (former Companies I, K, and L, 4th South Dakota Infantry, and 2 officers from 2nd North Dakota Infantry)
- 66th Field Artillery Brigade
  - 146th Field Artillery Regiment (75 mm) (former Headquarters and Supply Companies and 1st Battalion, 2nd Idaho Infantry, Battalion of Washington Field Artillery, and Battery A, New Mexico Field Artillery)
  - 147th Field Artillery Regiment (155 mm) (former Headquarters and Supply Companies, 1st Battalion, and Companies H and M, 4th South Dakota Infantry, and Batteries A and B, Oregon Field Artillery)
  - 148th Field Artillery Regiment (155 mm) (former Headquarters and Supply Companies and 1st Battalion, 3rd Wyoming Infantry, 1st Battalion Colorado Field Artillery, and 1st Separate Squadron Oregon Cavalry)
  - 116th Trench Mortar Battery
- 146th Machine Gun Battalion (former 3rd Battalion, 2nd Idaho Infantry, Machine Gun Company, 3rd Wyoming Infantry, and Machine Gun Company, 4th South Dakota Infantry)
- 116th Engineer Regiment (former 2nd Battalion, 2nd Idaho Infantry, part of Headquarters Company, 2nd North Dakota Infantry, and Battalion of Oregon Engineers)
- 116th Field Signal Battalion (former 1st Battalion, Washington Signal Corps, and Supply Company, 3rd D.C. Infantry)
- Headquarters Troop, 41st Division (former Troop C, 1st Squadron Washington Cavalry)
- 116th Train Headquarters and Military Police (former portion of Headquarters Company, 2nd North Dakota Infantry, and Troops A, B, and D, 1st Squadron Washington Cavalry)
  - 116th Ammunition Train (former 2nd and 3rd Battalions, 3rd Wyoming Infantry)
  - 116th Supply Train (former Companies E, F, and G, 4th South Dakota Infantry)
  - 116th Engineer Train (former Supply Company, 2nd North Dakota Infantry)
  - 116th Sanitary Train
    - 161st, 162nd, 163rd, and 164th Ambulance Companies and field Hospitals (former 1st Idaho Field Hospital, 1st Washington Field Hospital, Companies F, G, I, K, L, and M, 2nd North Dakota Infantry, detachment from 2nd Idaho Infantry, 3 officers from 3rd Wyoming Infantry, and 1 man from 4th South Dakota Infantry)

In France the 41st Division received a major disappointment when it was designated a replacement division and did not go into combat as a unit. The majority of its infantry personnel went to the 1st, 2nd, 32nd and 42nd Infantry Divisions where they served throughout the war. The 147th Field Artillery Regiment was attached mostly to the 32nd Division and saw action at the Third Battle of the Aisne, the Meuse-Argonne Offensive and other areas. The 146th and 148th Regiments of the 66th Field Artillery Brigade were also attached as corps artillery units and participated in the battles of Château-Thierry, Aisne-Marne, Saint-Mihiel and Meuse-Argonne Offensive.

=== Interwar period ===
The 41st Division headquarters arrived at the port of Hoboken, New Jersey, aboard the USS Leviathan on 12 February 1919, and was demobilized on 22 February at Camp Dix, New Jersey. Pursuant to the National Defense Act of 1920, the 41st Division was reconstituted in the National Guard in 1921 and allotted to the states of Idaho, Montana, Oregon, Washington and Wyoming, and assigned to the IX Corps. The division headquarters was organized and federally recognized on 3 January 1930 at Portland, Oregon, with Major General George A. White appointed as commander; he would remain in command until his death in 1941.

The designated mobilization training center for the “Sunset” Division was Camp Murray, Washington. The division staff, composed of personnel from all five states, came together to conduct joint training for several summers before World War II, usually at Fort Lewis or Camp Murray. However, for the 1938 camp, the staff assembled for training at Fort William Henry Harrison, near Helena, Montana. The division staff also participated in the Fourth Army command post exercise at Fort Lewis in 1935 and 1936, and at the Presidio of San Francisco in 1939. From 1922 to 1939, the division’s subordinate units generally held separate summer camps at locations within their respective states: Oregon units at the state military reservation at Camp Clatsop; Washington units at Camp Murray, Montana units at Fort William Henry Harrison, and Idaho units at Boise Barracks. For the 1937 camp, the division participated in the Ninth Corps Area phase of the Fourth Army maneuvers at Centralia-Fort Lewis held in August. The 41st paired with the 3rd Division, and a "Blue Army" drawn from the 41st Division attempted a combat crossing of the Nisqually River, which was defended by a "Red Army" under the command of Brigadier General (later US Army Chief of Staff) George Marshall, then the commander of the 3rd Division's 5th Infantry Brigade at Vancouver Barracks. The 41st Division's mission was accomplished by a night crossing of the river. In 1940, the “Sunset” Division again participated in the Fourth Army maneuvers at Fort Lewis, this time as part of the provisional IX Corps.

=== World War II ===
==== WWII division organization ====
===== Square division =====
The 41st Division's annual summer camp at Fort Lewis in June and July 1940 was extended from two weeks to three, and on 16 September 1940 with President Franklin D. Roosevelt's signing of the Selective Training and Service Act of 1940, the 41st Division was inducted into federal service for one year. It was one of four National Guard divisions to be inducted into federal service that day. The other divisions were the 30th Division, 44th Division and 45th Division. By this time, a National Guard recruiting campaign had raised the strength of the division to 14,000 – still well short of its war establishment strength of 18,500. The difference was made up by 7,000 Selective Service men, the first of whom arrived in February 1941.

At the time the division still retained its World War I square organization and consisted of the following units.

41st Division square organization (click to enlarge)

- 41st Division, in Portland (OR)
  - 41st Division Headquarters
  - 81st Infantry Brigade, in Tacoma (WA)
    - Headquarters and Headquarters Company, in Camp Murray (WA)
    - 161st Infantry Regiment, in Spokane (WA)
      - Headquarters and Headquarters Company
      - 3× Infantry battalions
        - each battalion consists of: 1× Headquarters and Headquarters Detachment, 3× Rifle companies, 1× Weapons Company
      - Anti-Tank Company (M3 37mm Anti-Tank guns)
      - Service Company
    - 163rd Infantry Regiment, in Whitefish (MT)
      - same organization as 161st Infantry Regiment
  - 82nd Infantry Brigade, in Portland (OR)
    - Headquarters and Headquarters Company, in Portland (OR)
    - 162nd Infantry Regiment, in Portland (OR)
      - same organization as 161st Infantry Regiment
    - 186th Infantry Regiment, in Medford (OR)
      - same organization as 161st Infantry Regiment
  - 66th Field Artillery Brigade, in Seattle (WA)
    - Headquarters and Headquarters Battery, in Seattle (WA)
    - 146th Field Artillery Regiment, in Seattle (WA)
      - Headquarters and Headquarters Battery
      - 2× Light Field Artillery battalions
        - Headquarters and Headquarters Battery
        - 3× Howitzer batteries (M1897 75mm field guns), replaced by M2 105mm towed howitzers in 1941)
        - Service Battery
    - 148th Field Artillery Regiment, in Tacoma (WA)
      - same organization as 146th Field Artillery Regiment
    - 218th Field Artillery Regiment, in Portland (OR)
      - Headquarters and Headquarters Battery
      - 2× Medium Field Artillery battalions
        - Headquarters and Headquarters Battery
        - 3× Howitzer batteries (M1918 155mm towed howitzers, replaced by M1 155mm towed howitzers in 1941)
        - Anti-Tank Battery (M1897 75mm anti-tank guns)
        - Service Battery
  - 116th Engineer Regiment, in Boise (ID)
    - Headquarters and Headquarters and Service Company
    - 2× Engineer battalions
      - each battalion consists of: 1× Headquarters, 3× Engineer companies
  - 116th Medical Regiment, in Seattle (WA)
    - Headquarters and Headquarters and Service Company
    - Collecting Battalion
      - battalion consists of: 1× Headquarters, 3× Collecting companies
    - Ambulance Battalion
      - battalion consists of: 1× Headquarters, 3× Ambulance companies
    - Clearing Battalion
      - battalion consists of: 1× Headquarters, 3× Clearing companies
  - 116th Quartermaster Regiment, in Seattle (WA)
    - Headquarters and Headquarters Company
    - 2× Truck battalions
      - each battalion consists of: 1× Headquarters, 2× Truck companies
    - Light Maintenance and Car Battalion
      - battalion consists of: 1× Headquarters, 1× Light Maintenance Company, 1× Car Company
    - Service Company
  - Headquarters, Special Troops, in Centralia (WA)
    - Headquarters Company, 41st Division, in Blackfoot (ID)
    - 41st Signal Company, in Portland (OR)
    - 116th Ordnance Company, in Jerome (ID)
    - 41st Military Police Company, in Green River (WY)

The division was initially accommodated in a tented camp at Camp Murray until the construction of new permanent barracks at nearby Fort Lewis could be completed. Delayed by strike action at sawmills in Washington and Oregon and by maritime workers, the project fell behind schedule, and the entire division was not accommodated in the new barracks until April 1941.

The 41st Division was grouped with the 3rd Division as part of IX Corps. In May 1941, the two divisions moved to the Hunter Liggett Military Reservation where June war games pitted them against Major General Joseph Stilwell's 7th Division and the 40th Division. Large scale maneuvers continued in August on the Olympic Peninsula, with IX Corps defending Tacoma, Washington until the two divisions from California could arrive to assist.

General White died of complications of dysentery on 23 November 1941 and was replaced by Brigadier General Horace H. Fuller, the former commander of the 3rd Division Artillery. Promoted to Major General on 15 December 1941, he would remain commander until June 1944.

Following the attack on Pearl Harbor, the 41st Infantry Division was deployed to defend the coastline of Washington and Oregon against a possible Japanese landing. The 218th Field Artillery had earlier been assigned to the defense of the Philippines, and was at sea en route when news of the attacks came; it was turned back to San Francisco and eventually rejoined the division.

===== Triangular division =====
On 17 February 1942, as a part of an Army-wide reorganization of National Guard divisions, the 41st Division was reorganized as a triangular division. The division's two brigade headquarters were disbanded in favor of a structure containing three separate regimental commands reporting directly to the division headquarters, as well as four field artillery battalions under a division artillery headquarters, with the engineer, medical, and quartermaster regiments also reduced to battalions. The 161st Infantry Regiment had already sailed to Hawaii on 16 December 1941. On 17 February 1942, the 161st Infantry Regiment was reassigned from the 41st Infantry Division to the Hawaiian Department, and on 3 August 1942, the regiment was reassigned from the Hawaiian Department to the 25th Infantry Division. With the reorganization the division was renamed 41st Infantry Division. Afterwards the 41st Infantry Division was composed of the following units:

41st Infantry Division triangular organization (click to enlarge)

- 41st Infantry Division
  - 41st Infantry Division Headquarters
  - 41st Cavalry Reconnaissance Troop (Mechanized) (M3 scout cars and then M8 Greyhound armored cars)
  - 162nd Infantry Regiment (assigned to division on 1 September 1942)
    - Headquarters and Headquarters Company
    - 3× Infantry battalions
      - each battalion consists of: 1× Headquarters and Headquarters Company, 3× Rifle companies, 1× Heavy Weapons Company
    - Cannon Company (T12 Gun Motor Carriages and T19 Howitzer Motor Carriages, later replaced by either M3 105mm towed howitzers or M7 Priest self propelled howitzers)
    - Anti-Tank Company (M3 37mm anti-tank guns, which were replaced by 1944 with M1 57mm anti-tank guns)
    - Service Company
  - 163rd Infantry Regiment
    - same organization as 162nd Infantry Regiment
  - 186th Infantry Regiment
    - same organization as 162nd Infantry Regiment
  - 41st Infantry Division Artillery
    - Headquarters and Headquarters Battery
    - 146th Field Artillery Battalion
      - Headquarters and Headquarters Battery
      - 3× Batteries (M2 105mm towed howitzers)
      - Service Battery
    - 167th Field Artillery Battalion
      - same organization as 146th Field Artillery Battalion
    - 205th Field Artillery Battalion
      - same organization as 146th Field Artillery Battalion
    - 218th Field Artillery Battalion
      - Headquarters and Headquarters Battery
      - 3× Batteries (M1 155mm towed howitzers)
      - Service Battery
  - Headquarters Special Troops
    - Headquarters Company, 41st Infantry Division
    - 41st Signal Company
    - 41st Quartermaster Company
    - 741st Ordnance Light Maintenance Company
    - 116th Military Police Platoon
    - 41st Infantry Division Band (attached)
  - 41st Quartermaster Battalion (Between September and November 1942 Quartermaster battalions were disbanded and their platoons used to form a Quartermaster Company and an Ordnance Company, which were both assigned to Headquarters Special Troops)
    - Headquarters and Headquarters Company (includes a service platoon and a maintenance platoon)
    - Truck Company
  - 116th Engineer Combat Battalion
    - Headquarters and Headquarters and Service Company
    - 3× Engineer combat companies
  - 116th Medical Battalion
    - Headquarters and Headquarters Detachment
    - 3× Collecting companies
    - Clearing Company

==== Combat chronicle ====
In February 1942, the 41st Infantry Division was alerted for overseas movement. It handed over its coastal defence responsibilities to the 3rd Infantry Division and concentrated at Fort Lewis. First to depart was the 162nd Infantry Regiment, the attached 641st Tank Destroyer Battalion, and 41st Cavalry Reconnaissance Troop, which entrained later that month for Fort Dix. This group departed the Brooklyn Navy Yard on 3 March 1942 and sailed for the Pacific via the Panama Canal, reaching Melbourne on 9 April. They were among the first U.S. military units to be engaged in offensive ground combat operations. (The others were the 32nd who preceded them into combat on New Guinea; the Americal and the 1st Marine on Guadalcanal, Carlson's Raiders on Makin Island; and the 9th, 3rd Infantry, 34 and the 2nd Armored Divisions who fought in North Africa.)

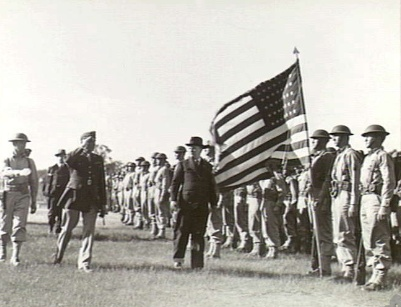
Recently arrived troops of the 41st Infantry Division are reviewed by Australian Army Minister Frank Forde on 14 April 1942, accompanied by Major General Horace H. Fuller. Note the World War I style M1917A1 Steel helmets.

A second group consisting of Division Headquarters, the 163rd Infantry Regiment, 41st Signal Company, 116th Engineer Battalion, 167th Field Artillery Battalion, 116th Medical Battalion, and 41st Quartermaster Battalion embarked from San Francisco on 19 March in a convoy that included the liner RMS Queen Elizabeth. This convoy reached Australia before the first, on 6 April. Because Melbourne could not accommodate the Queen Elizabeth, it unloaded at Sydney and the troops and cargo were moved to Melbourne by rail and smaller Dutch ships. That month the remainder of the division, including the 186th Infantry and 146th, 205th and 218th Field Artillery battalions entrained at Fort Lewis for San Francisco, from whence they sailed for Australia, arriving on 13 May. As each contingent arrived it moved to a camp near Seymour, Victoria, where training was conducted at the nearby Australian Army base at Puckapunyal.

In July the division moved by rail to Rockhampton, Queensland. The division had arrived in Australia with a reputation as "the top ranking National Guard division and one of the three top divisions in the whole Army", a reason for its early deployment.

Major General Robert L. Eichelberger, whose I Corps headquarters arrived in Rockhampton in August, ordered the division to commence training in jungle warfare. Each infantry battalion in turn was sent down to Toorbul, Queensland for training in amphibious warfare by the Australian Army.

===== Sanananda =====
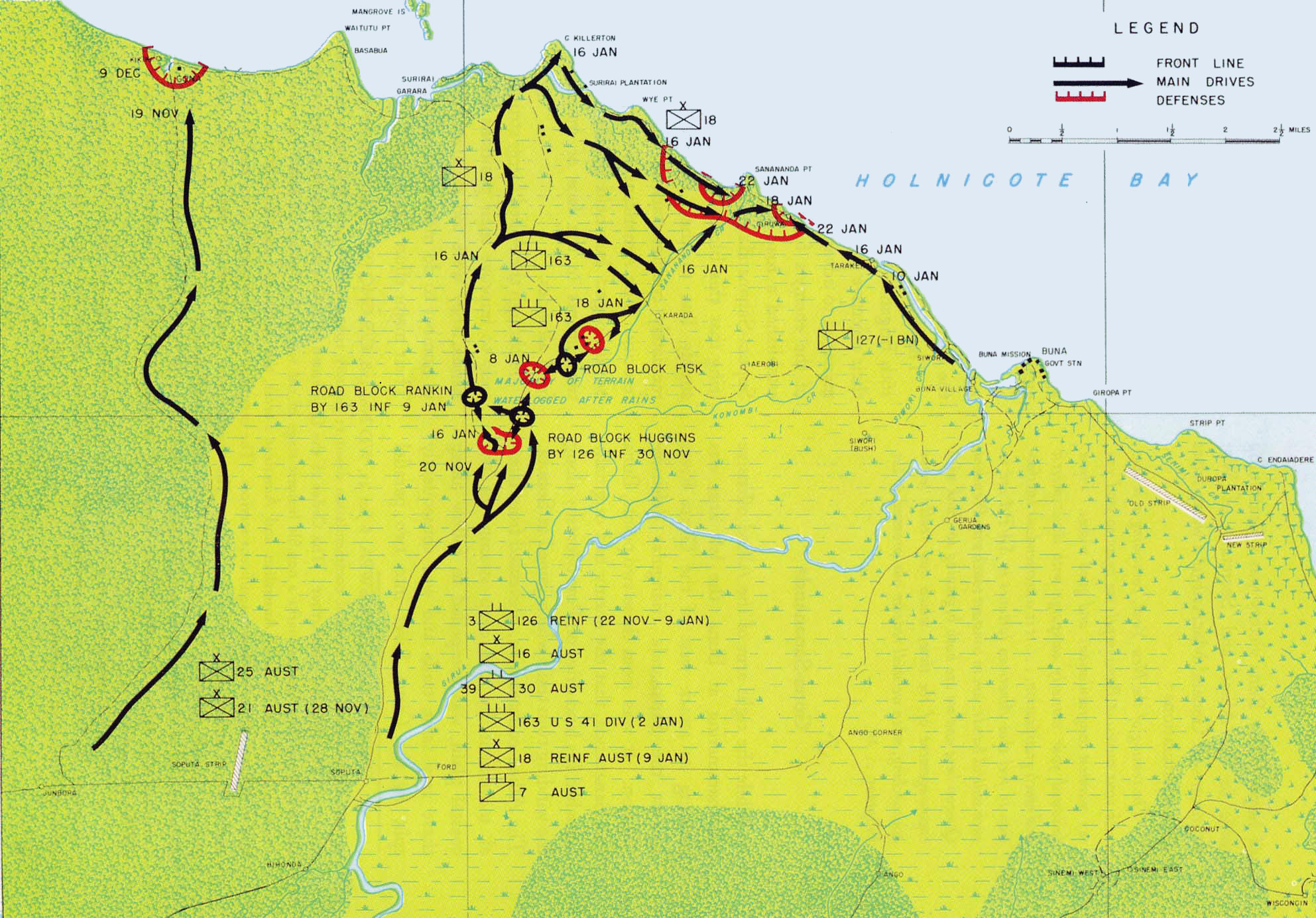
Sanananda Front, 22 November 1942 – 22 January 1943

In December, General Douglas MacArthur decided to commit more American troops to the Battle of Buna-Gona. The 163rd Regimental Combat Team, under the command of Colonel Jens A. Doe, was alerted on 14 December 1942. It arrived at Port Moresby on 27 December. The first elements, which included the 1st Battalion and regimental headquarters, flew over the Owen Stanley Range to Popondetta and Dobodura on 30 December, where they came under the command of Australian Lieutenant General Edmund Herring's Advanced New Guinea Force.

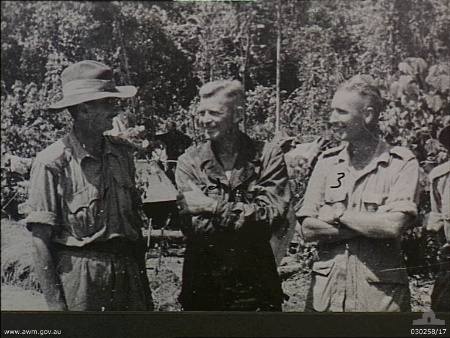
Allied commanders at Sanananda. Major General George Alan Vasey, commander of the 7th Australian Division (left), chatting to Colonel J. A. Doe, 163rd Infantry (centre).

The 163rd Regimental Combat Team was attached to Major General George Alan Vasey's 7th Australian Division and Doe assumed command of the positions on the Sanananda track from Brigadier Ivan Dougherty on 3 January 1943. The front line consisted of a raised road with Japanese positions on relatively dry ground astride it, surrounded by jungle swamp. Roadblocks had been established behind the Japanese positions but they had not been budged; both sides resupplied their positions through the swamp. Vasey's plan was for the Americans to fix the Japanese in position while he attacked with Brigadier George Wootten's 18th Australian Infantry Brigade, supported by Australian armor and artillery consisting of M3 Stuart light tanks of the 2/6th Armoured Regiment and 25 pounders of the 2/1st Field Regiment.

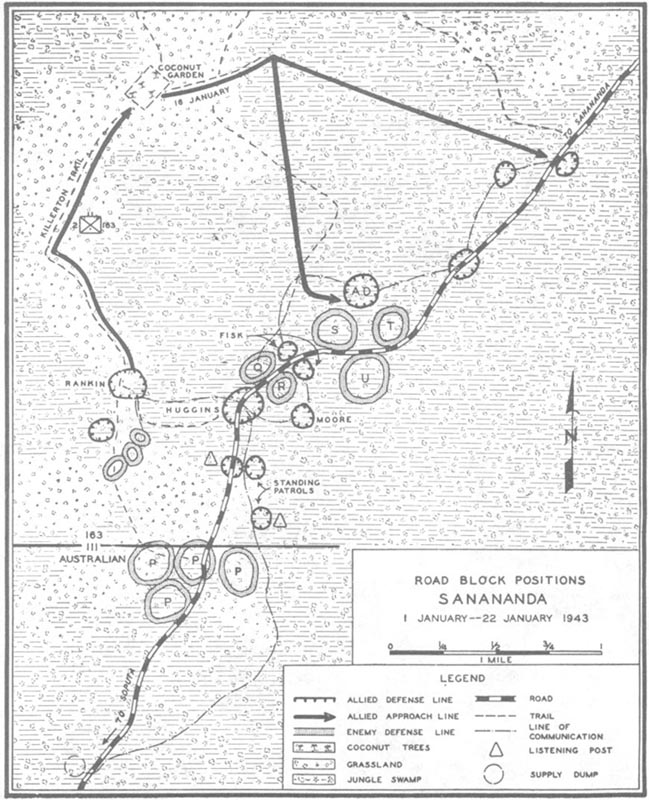
Sanananda road block positions 1–22 January 1943.

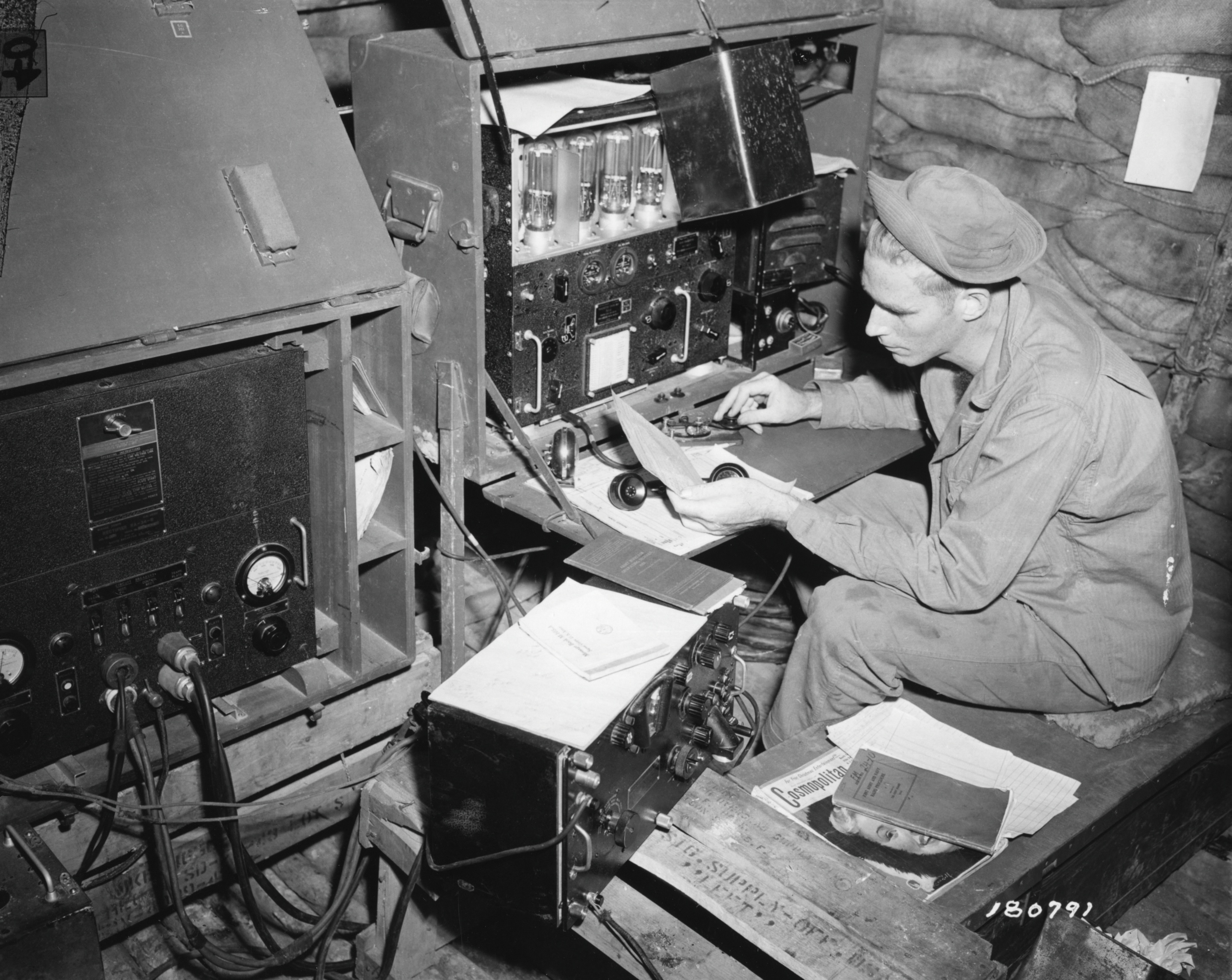
New Guinea. Radio Operator, Cpl. John Robbins of Louisville, Nebraska, 41st Signal, 41st Infantry Division, operating his SCR 188 in a sandbagged hut at Station NYU, Dobodura Airfield, New Guinea on 9 May 1943.

Doe, "eager to come to close grips with the Japanese", requested permission to launch an attack against the enemy Perimeters Q and R between his two roadblocks. Herring and Vasey thought that he was underestimating the enemy, but Vasey gave permission for the attack, provided that it would not jeopardize the main plan. The attack went ahead on the afternoon of 8 January 1943 but both attacking companies of the 1st Battalion, 163rd Infantry encountered heavy fire and were thrown back. First Lieutenant Harold R. Fisk became the first officer of the division to be killed in action. His body could not be immediately recovered. He was posthumously awarded the Silver Star. The roadblock position he had attacked from was named Fisk in his honor.

The first part of Vasey's plan involved the blocking of the Killerton Trail to prevent the Japanese from using it as an escape route, and to provide a jumping off point for a later advance by the 18th Infantry Brigade. The 2nd Battalion, 163rd Infantry, under Major Walter R. Rankin, set out early on 9 January 1943. Company G, covering the flank of the advance, was strongly engaged by Japanese heavy machine gun, mortar, and rifle fire. The remainder of the battalion established themselves astride the trail in a new position which was named Rankin after the battalion commander. The attack had cost four dead and six wounded. More casualties would be taken holding the position over the next few days.

On 10 January, a patrol from the 163rd Infantry discovered that the Japanese had unaccountably evacuated Perimeter Q. This was occupied at once by Company A, which sent out tree snipers and patrols to harass the enemy and feel out the contour of the Perimeter R, which was now open to attack from all sides. The Japanese had left behind a considerable quantity of material, including a water-cooled .50 caliber machine gun. The Japanese had evidently been very hungry and there was evidence of cannibalism.

With the roadblock established, the 18th Infantry Brigade launched the main attack against Perimeter P on 12 January. Vasey's plan of attack was based on the assumption that the Japanese defenders had no antitank guns. This proved to be incorrect, and three Stuart tanks were hit by fire from a concealed 37mm anti-tank gun. Although the 2/9th and 2/12th Infantry Battalions killed some Japanese and gained some ground, the Japanese position remained intact. The attack cost 18th Infantry Brigade 34 killed, 66 wounded and 51 missing.

Wootten reported that to continue the attack under the existing conditions could only lead to heavy casualties. Vasey directed him to continue aggressive patrolling. They had completely misread the situation. On 14 January, a patrol from the 163rd Infantry captured a very sick Japanese soldier. Taken to 7th Division headquarters for interrogation, the man revealed that the Japanese commander, Lieutenant Colonel Tsukamoto Hatsuo, had ordered all able bodied men to evacuate Perimeter P, leaving the sick and wounded to hold it to the last. Vasey ordered an immediate attack. Supported by a troop of the 2/1st Field Regiment and their own mortars, Rankin's 2nd Battalion reduced the three small enemy perimeters to the south of their position and advanced to meet the Australians on the Killerton Track. By early afternoon the Australians and Americans had also joined hands on the Sanananda Road as well. Some 152 Japanese were killed and six captured.

On 15 January, a platoon of A Company managed to get inside Perimeter R undetected. The rest of the company followed, taking the Japanese defenders by surprise. Company C joined in the attack from the Fisk while Company B attacked from the west. Bunker after bunker fell to small groups attacking with rifles, grenades and submachine guns but the Japanese resistance was desperate and the entire position was not taken until the next day.

The Australians carried out a wide envelopment, reaching the sea on 16 January, but the 163rd Infantry remained confronted by Perimeters S, T, and U, although these were not immediately located. A first attack succeeded in establishing a new position called AD. On 19 January, an attack supported by 250 25-pounder and 750 M1 Mortar rounds faltered after a Japanese mortar round killed Company I's commander, Captain Duncan V. Dupree and its First Sergeant, James W. Boland. In his situation report, under "American troops", Vasey wrote "Heb. 13:8" ("Jesus Christ, the same yesterday, today and for ever.") But the next day, Companies A and K managed to fight their way into Perimeter T. This softened resistance from Perimeter S, and Companies B and C were then able to capture it. Some 525 Japanese dead were counted after the attack. Finally, on 22 January, Companies I and L were able to capture Perimeter U, counting another 69 Japanese dead.

In just three weeks of fighting in January 1943, the 163rd Infantry lost 85 killed, 16 other deaths, 238 wounded and 584 sick, a total of 923 casualties.

===== Salamaua =====
The 162nd Infantry, commanded by Colonel A. R. MacKechnie, ended its long period of waiting and got its baptism of fire in early 1943. The fight, which resulted in the fall of Salamaua and Lae, lasted for 76 days after the initial landing. The Presidential unit citation awarded the 1st Battalion, 162nd Infantry Regiment, reads "for outstanding performance of duty against the enemy near Salamaua, New Guinea. On 29 and 30 June 1943, this battalion landed at Nassau Bay in one of the first amphibious operations by American forces in the Southwest Pacific Area, on a beach held by the enemy, and during a severe storm which destroyed 90 percent of the landing craft able to reach the beach. Moving inland through deep swamps, crossing swift rivers, cutting its way through dense jungle, over steep ridges, carrying by hand all weapons, ammunition, and food, assisted by only a limited number of natives, this battalion was in contact with the enemy for 76 consecutive days without rest or relief. All operations after the initial landing were far inland. Living conditions were most severe because of constant rain, mud, absence of any shelter, tenacious enemy, and mountainous terrain. The supply of rations, ammunition and equipment was meager. For five weeks all personnel lived on rations dropped by airplane, for days at a time on half rations. Malaria and battle casualties greatly depleted their ranks, but at no time was there a let-up in morale or in determination to destroy the enemy. Each officer and enlisted man was called upon to give his utmost of courage and stamina. The battalion killed 584 Japanese during this period, while suffering casualties of 11 officers and 176 enlisted men. Cutting the Japanese supply line near Mubo, exerting constant pressure on his flank, the valiant and sustained efforts of this battalion were in large part instrumental in breaking enemy resistance and forcing his withdrawal from Salamaua on 12 September 1943. General Orders 91."

===== Hollandia =====
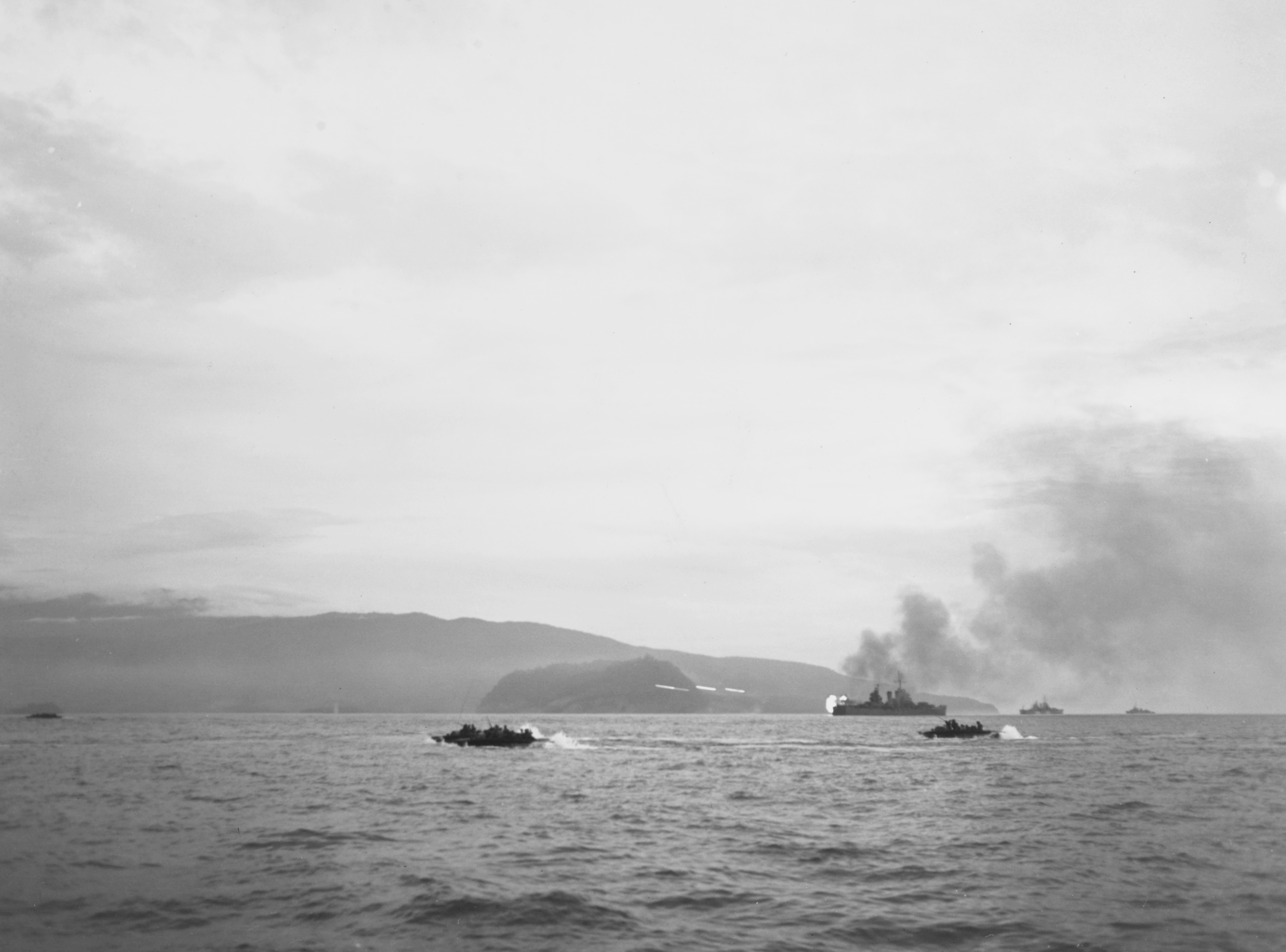
22 April 1944. LVTs (Landing Vehicles Tracked) in the foreground head for the invasion beaches at Humboldt Bay

The 41st Infantry Division returned to Australia for rest, reinforcements, and re-equipping. By April 1944, an armada of a hundred ships carrying 25,000 men and tons of equipment had been assembled for an attack on the Humboldt Bay area of New Guinea to secure Japanese-held airfields. A massive naval bombardment was followed by air strikes to soften the area for the amphibious landing. The 162nd Infantry moved north to overrun its objective, Hollandia Town, while the 186th Infantry moved west to capture two airfields. On the second day, a low-flying enemy bomber made a direct hit on an American ammunition dump. The subsequent explosions ignited a two-day firestorm that consumed all American ammunition and rations landed in that beach area, and caused 24 deaths and over 100 injuries. Rationing became necessary. Soft sand bogged tanks, and LVTs became mired along swampy roads. The terrain was favorable for the Japanese defense, but most Japanese troops had moved to Wewak, where the next Allied thrust was expected. As a result, casualties were light. High-ranking Army and Navy officers who had witnessed the landing described it as the perfect amphibious assault."

===== Aitape =====
While the 162nd Infantry and 186th Infantry were making the landings in Humboldt Bay, the 163rd Regimental Combat Team, backbone of a task force of 22,500 men under the command of General Doe, was making a simultaneous landing at Aitape. The mission of this force was to rapidly seize the airfields in the Aitape-Tadji area and to prepare them quickly to accommodate one fighter group. The naval bombardment was so well executed that the enemy fled inland. The advance was so rapid that engineer units pronounced the captured airstrip ready for use two days after the landing. Some enemy resistance was encountered by patrols, but was pushed back effectively. On 3 May the 163rd was relieved by the 32nd Division.

===== Wakde Island =====
The occupation of Wakde was to be a shore-to-shore operation, it was too small an island to permit a major landing force. Following a naval bombardment on 17 May, the 163rd Infantry landed four companies (A, B, C and F), seized the beachhead and began the push inland assisted by four M4 Sherman medium tanks. The companies executed a successful flanking maneuver which left the important airfield in the middle of the island in Allied control after only two days of fighting. The campaign was unique for its brevity and conclusiveness, and marked the first time that terrain and conditions permitted the full use of tanks.

===== Biak =====
The 41st Division's bloodiest engagement was on the island of Biak, off New Guinea's coast. It marked the first time the division had fought as a whole, and resulted in the defeat of over ten thousand well-entrenched and well-led Japanese forces. The campaign extended from May through August 1944, and the 41st earned a new nickname, "The Jungleers." The first tank battle of the Pacific Theater occurred on Biak, when Japanese Type 95 Ha-Go tanks attempted to attack the beachhead. They were destroyed by US Army M4 Sherman tanks. Casualties on Biak were 435 Americans KIA and 2,360 WIA. The Japanese lost an estimated 6,125 KIA, with 460 POWs, and 360 Formosan POWs. After finally securing the island, American troops developed southern Biak into a large airbase and staging area. Biak contained three aerodromes; Mokmer, Borokoe and Sorido. The capture of Mokmer Drome was particularly challenging due to the proximity of cliffs of coral that provided very strategic cover for Japanese heavy guns. Because the 41st failed to repeat the swift progress made in prior landings, General Fuller was relieved as commander of Hurricane Task Force. Continuous heavy fighting, intense heat and scarcity of water had tired the task force troops to a critical degree. General Eichelberger and General Doe were to prove able successors, but it took until 20 August to officially terminate a campaign that had begun with beach landings on 27 May 1944.

===== Palawan =====
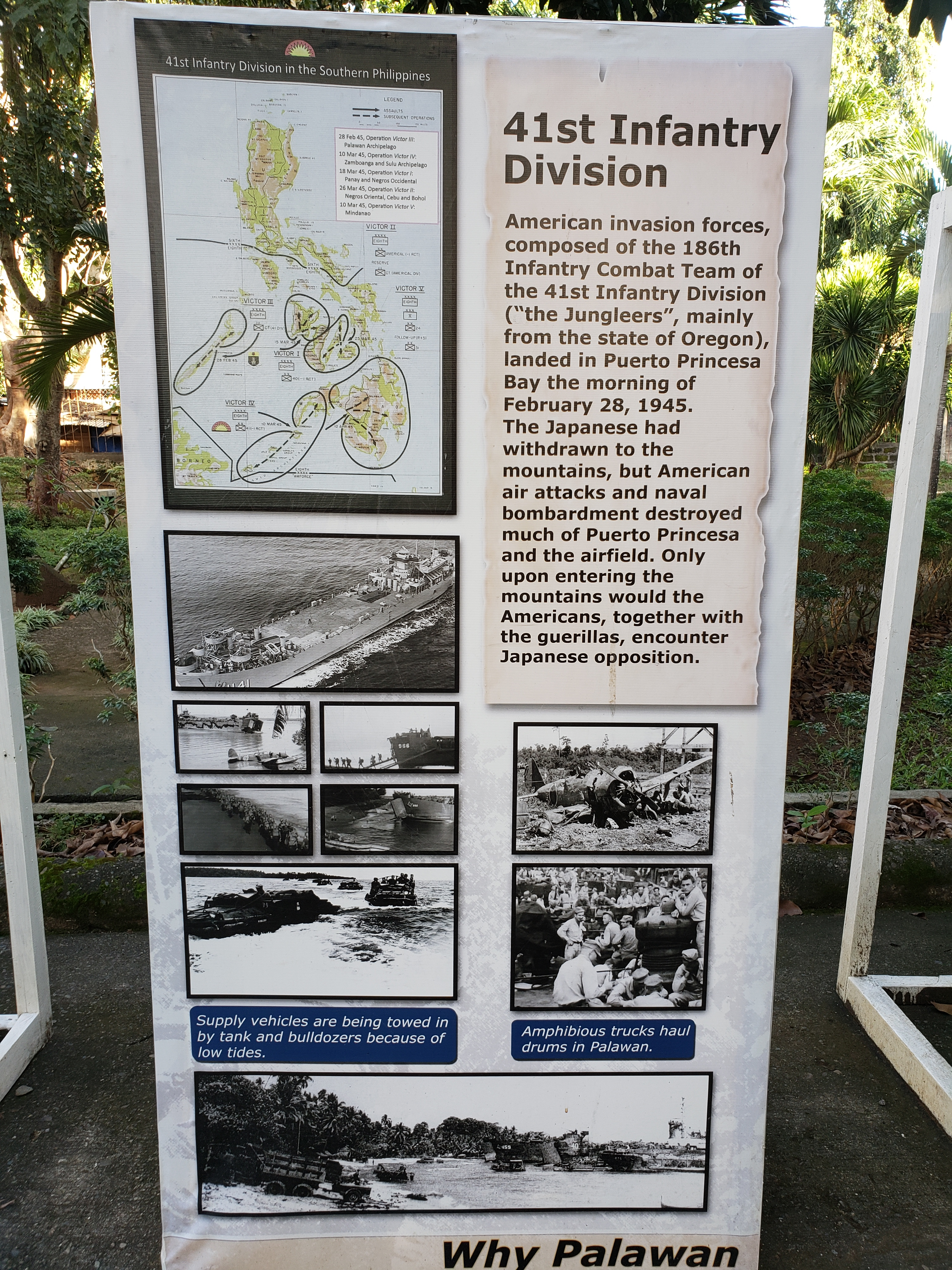
Plaza Cuartel Museum, Puerto Princesa, historical marker for the 41st Division

The 186th Regimental Combat Team landed on Palawan on 28 February 1945 in their first action in the Philippine Islands. The local airfields were found to be unserviceable due to the pre-landing bombardments, and the town of Puerto Princesa was mostly destroyed. However, in three years of campaigning, this was the first semblance of civilization. American casualties were 12 killed and 56 wounded. Filipino casualties were 55 killed and 120 wounded. Japanese losses were 890 dead and 20 POWs. The operation terminated on 20 June 1945.

===== Zamboanga =====
U.S. amphibious forces riding up the Mindanao River

Zamboanga, and the Sulu Archipelago. The massive assault on the Philippine island of Mindanao began with naval and air bombardments along the beach defenses east of Zamboanga City, forcing the enemy to evacuate these excellent defensive positions. The 162nd and 163rd Infantry Regiments made their landings, and the enemy fled into the hills in disorder. These assault landings earned the division its arrowhead distinction for its campaign streamer. A series of counterattacks faced the Jungleers, but they prevailed despite well-established hill positions, which were overrun by 24 March. By the end of March, the 186th Infantry had rejoined the Division and relieved elements of the 163rd, who proceeded to the island of Jolo, followed by more island-hopping to Tawi-Tawi. The conquest of the entire Sulu chain of islands left just mopping up to be done. The Southern Philippines had been freed from Japanese oppression.

===== Occupation of Japan =====
After the fall of the Philippines, the division began training for the attack on Japan itself, but surrender came first. The division did move to Japan where it occupied the island of Honshū for a few months. The 41st Infantry Division was inactivated at Kure-Hiro, Japan on 31 December 1945.

==== Casualties ====
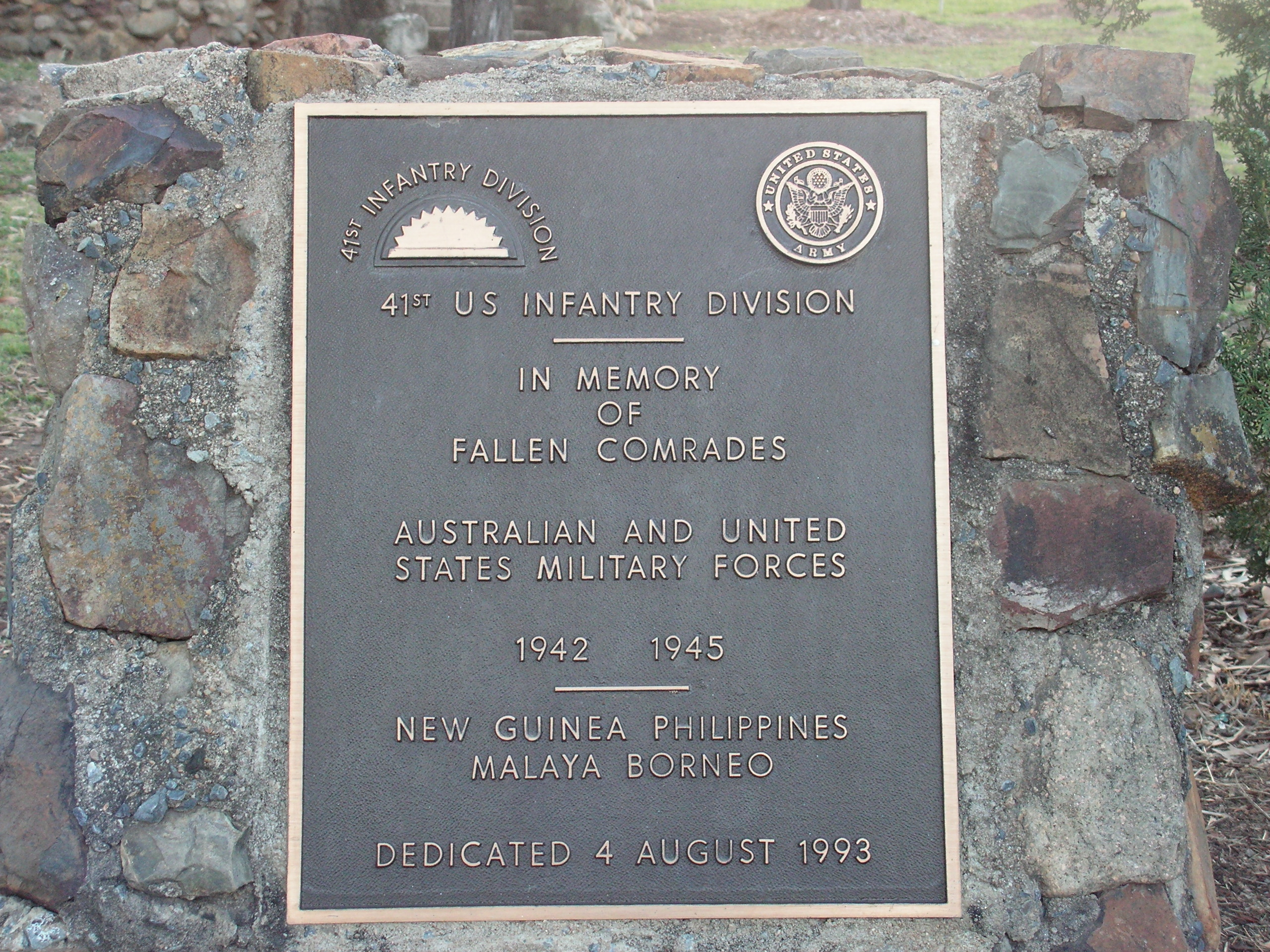
Memorial Plaque near Rockhampton, Australia

- Total battle casualties: 4,260
- Killed in action: 743
- Wounded in action: 3,504
- Missing in action: 13

=== Cold War ===
At the conclusion of World War II, the National Guard was almost completely demobilized, its Soldiers separated from military service, and sent directly to civilian life leaving virtually no National Guard at all. Despite this immediate purge of manpower, the War Department was already planning its reconstitution. The War Department published a postwar policy statement on October 13, 1945 which called for the rebuilding of the Regular Army, National Guard of the United States, and the Organized Reserve Corps. This ultimately led to the decision to reconstitute 27 divisions within the National Guard, to include the 41st. Of these 27, ten of them would be divided among multiple states.

Preliminary plans for the post-war reorganization of the 41st was to maintain its triangle task organization from the Second World War and proposed it split between Idaho, Oregon, and Washington. However, after Oregon’s desire to reorganize two of its infantry regiments of the Division, modifications to the plan were made between Idaho and Oregon, with concurrence of Chief, National Guard Bureau, so that the final distribution of the 41st Division was split between Oregon and Washington. This division of the 41st between the two states required an agreement between them as to the assignment of the Division Commander and Division headquarters. Eventually, the Adjutants General of Oregon and Washington agreed to a rotation of certain staff personnel coinciding with the rotation of the Division Commander, with each state maintaining a partial Division headquarters element in Portland and Seattle, respectively. Initially, it was agreed that the first Division Commander would go to Oregon, but only on the condition that the first command be given to Brigadier General Thomas E. Rilea, formerly the Assistant Division Commander, with the new Assistant Division Commander to Washington. Then every four years afterwards, the seats would rotate states. However, if General Rilea was not able to qualify for federal recognition as Division Commander, then the position would at once revert to the Washington and the Assistant Division Commander to Oregon. On August 2, 1946, it was announced that General Rilea had been disqualified for military service for medical reasons and the first Division Commander of the 41st since post-war reorganization would go to Washington.

In the mid-1950s, the Division followed suit with the rest of the Army reorganizing itself into a Pentomic division. This concept was derived as a means to create five somewhat autonomous elements within a division, called battle groups, that could activate and attack quicker than a brigade as a new strategy to prepare for tactical nuclear warfare. Each battle group was commanded by a colonel and comprised five maneuver companies and a support company. The regiment and battalion echelons were removed and the Combat Arms Regimental System (CARS) was adopted to account for the significant shift in unit lineage and heritage.

The Division saw yet another reorganization in March 1963 when it adopted the Reorganization Objective Army Division (ROAD) concept returning the Division back to a triangular task organization, but this transformation was short lived. Assessing a lack of necessity, the Secretary of Defense McNamara reduced the number of National Guard combat divisions from 15 to 8, in 1967, however the total number of separate brigades went up to 18 from 7. As a result of McNamara’s decision, the Division was divided into two infantry brigades, the 41st Infantry Brigade in Oregon, and the 81st Infantry Brigade in Washington, the later reactivating the Division’s original Washington brigade under its World War I task organization. The 41st Infantry Division deactivated in 1968.

The 41st Infantry Division holds annual reunions for its World War II veterans. In 2008 the reunion was held in Washington, D.C. The veterans had the opportunity to visit Arlington National Cemetery and hold a special wreath laying ceremony at the Tomb of the Unknown Soldier. Many of the veterans also visited the World War II memorial for the first time. Several were accompanied by family (including spouses, children, grandchildren, and in a couple of cases, great-grandchildren). The Jungeleer is the publication of the 41st Infantry and is available to all former members of this division.

== Commanders ==
=== World War I ===
- Major General Hunter Liggett (18 September 1917)
- Brigadier General Henry Jervey (20 September 1917)
- Brigadier General George LeRoy Irwin (12 December 1917)
- Major General Hunter Liggett (20 December 1917)
- Brigadier General George LeRoy Irwin (18 January 1918)
- Brigadier General Richard Coulter Jr. (23 January 1918)
- Brigadier General Robert Alexander (14 February 1918)
- Brigadier General Edward Vollrath (3 August 1918)
- Brigadier General William Sherley Scott (19 August 1918)
- Major General John E. McMahon (21 October 1918)
- Brigadier General Edward Vollrath (24 October 1918)
- Brigadier General Eli K. Cole, USMC (29 October 1918)
- Brigadier General Edward Vollrath (27 December 1918)
- Major General Peter E. Traub (29 December 1918)

=== World War II ===
- Major General George A. White (3 January 1930)
- Brigadier General Carlos A. Pennington (23 November 1941)
- Major General Horace H. Fuller (2 December 1941)
- Major General Jens A. Doe (18 June 1944)
- Major General Ralph S. Phelps April 1963-September 1968 (last commanding Major General). General Phelps was also the commanding officer of the first Army Ski Patrol established in 1941 at Camp Murray which later became the 10th Mountain Division. He joined the 41st in 1938 as a private.
