= Jens A. Doe =

United States Army general (1891–1971)

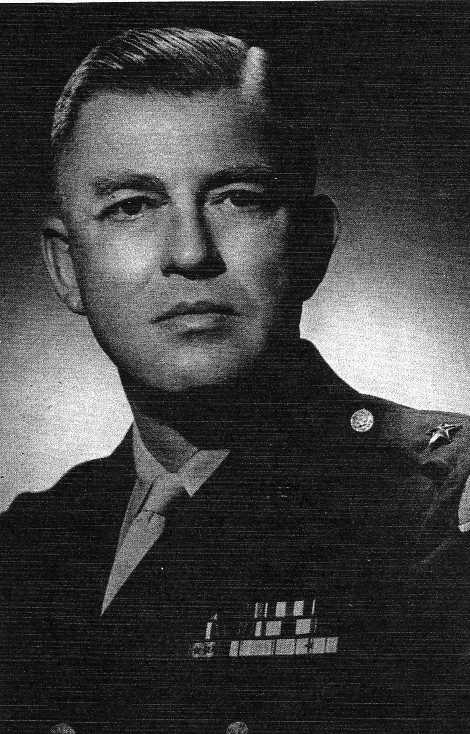
- Born: June 20, 1891; Chicago, Illinois, United States
- Died: February 25, 1971 (aged 79); Carmel, California, United States
- Burial place: West Point Cemetery, West Point, New York, United States
- Military career
- Allegiance: United States
- Branch: United States Army
- Service years: 1914−1949
- Rank: Major General
- Service number: 0-3743
- Unit: Infantry Branch
- Commands: 14th Machine Gun Battalion; 15th Machine Gun Battalion; 1st Battalion, 17th Infantry Regiment; 17th Infantry Regiment; 163rd Infantry Regiment; 41st Infantry Division; 5th Infantry Division; 3rd Infantry Division; 4th Infantry Division
- Conflicts: World War I World War II
- Awards: Distinguished Service Cross; Distinguished Service Medal (3); Silver Star (5); Purple Heart; Air Medal

Jens Anderson Doe (20 June 1891 – 25 February 1971) was a major general in the United States Army best known for his command of the 41st Infantry Division in the South West Pacific Area during World War II.

== Education and early life ==
Jens Anderson Doe was born on 20 June 1891 in Chicago, Illinois to Norwegian immigrant parents. He graduated 105th of 107 from the United States Military Academy (USMA) at West Point, New York and was commissioned as a second lieutenant in the 11th Infantry on 12 June 1914. Doe was initially stationed with the 11th Infantry successively at Texas City, Texas, Naco, Arizona, and Douglas, Arizona.

== World War I ==
Doe was promoted to first lieutenant on 1 July 1916 and captain on 15 May 1917, a few weeks after the American entry into World War I. From May to August 1917 he was stationed with the 11th Infantry at Fort Oglethorpe, Georgia. He attended a machine gun training course at Fort Sill before assuming command of the 15th Machine Gun Battalion, part of the newly created 5th Division, in December 1917. In April 1918, he sailed for France.

Promoted to the temporary rank of major on 17 June 1918, Doe served as the 5th Division's Machine Gun Officer before assuming command of the 14th Machine Gun Battalion, also of the 5th Division, in July. As such, he participated in the Battle of Saint-Mihiel and the subsequent Meuse–Argonne offensive, the largest battle in the history of the United States Army, where he was wounded, although his gallantry earned him the Silver Star.

In November 1918, the same month the Armistice with Germany brought the war to an end, Doe organised and became an instructor at the Army Machine Gun School at Langres. He was an instructor at the II Corps Schools, and a student at the Artillery Center. In June 1919 he joined the 61st Infantry, returning to the United States with it in June 1919.

== Between the wars ==
In September 1919 he became an instructor at the Infantry School at Fort Benning. He attended the Field Officers' Course in 1921–1922, after which he was assigned to the 2nd Infantry at Fort Sheridan, Illinois, as a machine gun officer at Fort Custer, and to the USMA at West Point.

Doe attended the United States Army Command and General Staff College at Fort Leavenworth from 1925 to 1926 and on graduation was posted to the 15th Infantry at Tientsin, China. He did not return to the United States until 1930, when he joined the 16th Infantry at Fort Jay. He then commanded the machine gun school at Fort Dix until 1932, when he left to attend the United States Army War College. After nearly 18 years as a major, he was finally promoted to lieutenant colonel on 1 January 1936. He was an instructor at the Command and General Staff College and Professor of Military Science and Tactics at the University of California, Berkeley.

== World War II ==
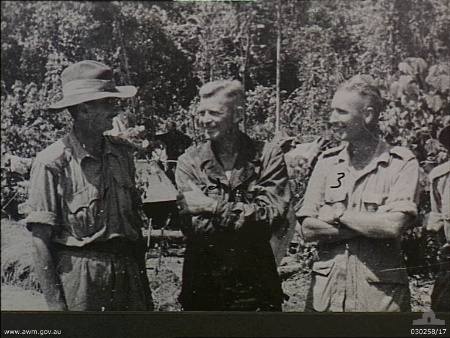
Major General George Alan Vasey, commanding the 7th Australian Division (left), chatting to Colonel Jens A. Doe, commanding the U.S. 163rd Infantry Regiment (center), and other Australian officers at a unit headquarters in the forward area during the advance to Sanananda, January 1943.

Doe joined the newly reformed 7th Division at Fort Ord in September 1940 and became both the executive officer (XO) and commanding officer (CO) of the 1st Battalion, 17th Infantry Regiment, part of the 7th Division. He was to hold this post until February 1941. After assuming command of the regiment in March 1941, he was promoted to colonel on 1 July 1941.

In June 1942, six months after the United States entered World War II, Doe relinquished command of the regiment and was sent to Australia to command the 163rd Infantry.

The 163rd Infantry was selected as the first regiment of the 41st Infantry Division to enter combat, at Sanananda in January 1943. For his leadership, Doe was awarded the Distinguished Service Cross. His citation read:

For extraordinary heroism in connection with military operations against an armed enemy while serving as Commanding Officer of the 163d Infantry Regiment, 41st Infantry Division, in action against enemy forces on 21 and 22 January, near Sanananda, New Guinea. As commander of an infantry regiment which was engaged in wiping out the remaining points of enemy resistance, Colonel Doe distinguished himself with his coolness and gallantry under fire. In the reduction of these strongly fortified areas his outstanding leadership and courageous conduct were a continuous inspiration to his troops. Colonel Doe's presence in the most forward areas and his disregard of personal danger were largely responsible for the high morale of his troops and the successful outcome of these operations. Colonel Doe's inspiring leadership, personal bravery and zealous devotion to duty exemplify the highest traditions of the military forces of the United States and reflect great credit upon himself, the 41st Infantry Division, and the United States Army.

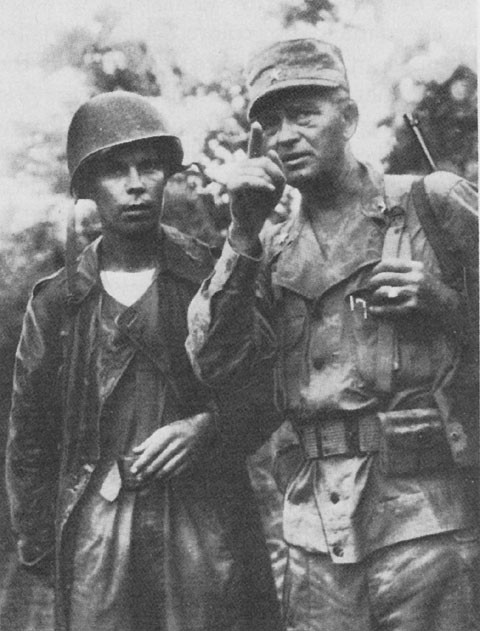
Brigadier General Jens A. Doe and his aide, First Lieutenant Rob D. Trimble, during the landing at Arare, May 1944.

This action also resulted in Doe becoming the Assistant Division Commander (ADC) and being promoted to the temporary rank of brigadier general on 2 February 1943, while his permanent rank was promoted from lieutenant colonel to colonel on the same date.

Doe led the Persecution Task Force that landed at Aitape, and the Tornado Task Force that landed at Wakde, both of which were built around the 163rd Infantry. When Sixth Army commander Lt. Gen. Walter Krueger tried to visit him at his headquarters on 26 April 1944, he found that Doe had gone to the front lines to be with his men. For these actions he was awarded the Army Distinguished Service Medal.

His task force was absorbed back into the 41st Infantry Division for the Battle of Biak. In this battle he earned an oak leaf cluster to the Silver Star he had won in the Great War. His citation read:

In the Southwest Pacific in June 1944, he displayed outstanding leadership and devotion to duty under Japanese machine gun, rifle and mortar fire, and in personally moving among forward assault troops. By his calm manner and courageous actions, he greatly assisted the advance.

At Biak the commander of the 41st Infantry Division, Major General Horace H. Fuller asked to be relieved of his command. Both Fuller and Major General Robert L. Eichelberger, commanding I Corps, had recommended Doe for the next available divisional command, so Doe assumed command of the 41st Infantry Division and was promoted to the temporary rank of major general on 1 August 1944. For his leadership at Biak he was also awarded an oak leaf cluster to his Distinguished Service Medal.

In February and March 1945, Doe led 41st Infantry Division at Palawan and Zamboanga, where he earned a second oak leaf cluster to his Silver Star. His citation read:

For gallantry in action at Zamboanga, Mindanao, Philippine Islands from 10 March 1945 to 23 April 1945. During this time in the capacity of division commander General Doe directed the initial assault and the consequent capture of Zamboanga. His outstanding leadership, indomitable courage and skilful tactical knowledge resulted in his division scoring a firm foothold on Mindanao Island. On many occasions without regard to his personal safety, he went forward to units engaged in heavy fighting in order to gain first hand information bout the tactical situation.

Doe also received the Air Medal for his numerous flights over Japanese held areas.

== Later life ==
Doe remained in command of the 41st Infantry Division until it was inactivated in Japan at midnight on 31 December 1945. He returned to the United States for a brief tour of duty at the War Department before assuming command of the 5th Infantry Division, with which he had served in World War I, at Fort Campbell on 9 August 1946. On 29 September 1946 he assumed command of the 3rd Infantry Division and, from July 1947 until February 1949, he took command of the 4th Infantry Division

Doe was promoted to the permanent rank of major general on 24 January 1948, backdated to 6 September 1944. He retired from the army in February 1949 and settled in Carmel, California. Doe died there on 25 February 1971, at the age of 79. He was buried at the West Point Cemetery on 3 March 1971.

== Bibliography ==
- Ancell, R. Manning; Miller, Christine (1996), The Biographical Dictionary of World War II Generals and Flag Officers: The US Armed Forces, Westport, Connecticut: Greenwood Press, p. 86, ISBN 0-313-29546-8
- Eichelberger, Robert L. (1950), Our Jungle Road to Tokyo, New York City: Viking Press, ISBN 0-89839-132-6
- McCartney, William F. (1948), The Jungleers: A History of the 41st Infantry Division (1st ed.), Washington, D.C.: Infantry Journal Press, pp. 190–191, OCLC 2339701

Military offices
Preceded by Horace H. Fuller	Commanding General 41st Infantry Division; 1944–1945	Succeeded by Post deactivated
Preceded by Albert E. Brown	Commanding General 5th Infantry Division; July–September 1946	Succeeded by Post deactivated
Preceded by Robert N. Bathurst	Commanding General 3rd Infantry Division; 1946–1947	Succeeded by Percy W. Clarkson
Preceded by George P. Hays	Commanding General 4th Infantry Division; 1947–1949	Succeeded by Robert T. Frederick
