= George A. White =

American journalist (1880–1941)

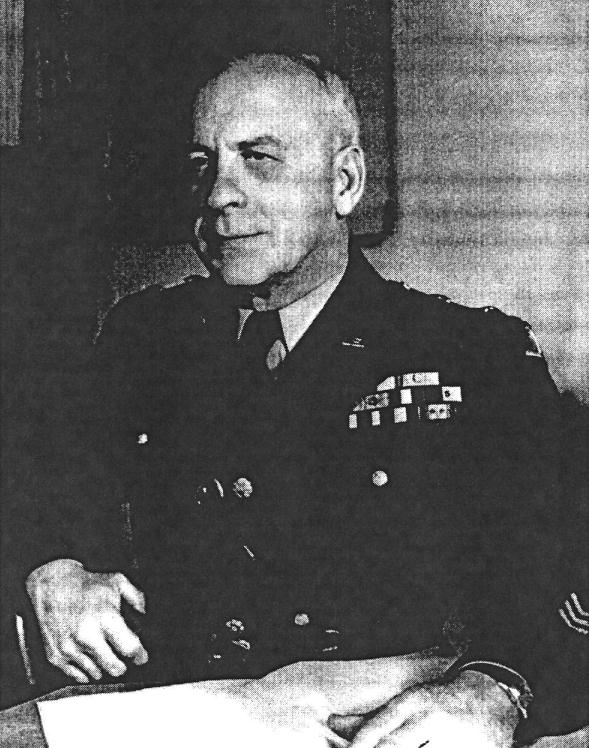
- White in uniform, 1941
- Born: July 18, 1880; Saline County, Illinois, U.S.
- Died: November 23, 1941 (aged 61); Clackamas, Oregon, U.S.
- Burial place: River View Cemetery, Portland, Oregon, U.S. 45°27′42.3″N 122°40′24.8″W
- Military career
- Allegiance: United States
- Branch: United States Army
- Service years: 1895–1941
- Rank: Major General
- Commands: 41st Infantry Division
- Conflicts: Spanish–American War World War I: Meuse-Argonne; Defensive Sector
- Awards: Grand Cross of the Legion of Honor (France); Knight, Order of the Black Star (France)

Major General George A. White (18 July 1880 – 23 November 1941) was an American journalist, magazine editor, and senior officer of the Oregon National Guard, who helped organize The American Legion. He commanded the 41st Infantry Division, made up of troops from the Idaho, Montana, Oregon, Washington, and Wyoming National Guards, from January 1930 until his death in November 1941.

== Early life ==
George Ared White was born on July 18, 1880, in Saline County, Illinois. On August 1, 1895, he enlisted in the Utah National Guard as a musician. He was discharged in June 1898 in order to enlist in the U.S. Volunteers for the Spanish–American War. He remained in Federal service until discharged in December 1898. White re-enlisted in the Guard in 1899 was promoted to sergeant and later first sergeant before being discharged in 1903. He moved to Oregon, where he enlisted in the 3d Infantry, Oregon National Guard on August 4, 1907. The next day he was promoted to first lieutenant. White was promoted to Captain on March 21, 1911.

== Military career ==
=== Mexican Border Service ===
White was appointed Adjutant General of Oregon on February 1, 1915. When the National Guard was Federalized for Mexican Border Service, he obtained a leave of absence in order to command a troop of Oregon cavalry. After service on the Mexican border from June 1916 to February 1917, White resumed his post in Oregon.

=== World War I ===
On March 23, 1917, the National Guard was mobilized. As Adjutant General of Oregon, White was involved in recruiting efforts to bring the State's units up to strength, and he directed the establishment of state machinery for conscription. He re-entered federal service on September 10, 1917, with the rank of major and assigned as Assistant Adjutant General of the 41st Division, a new division being organized from National Guard units from Oregon, Washington, Idaho, Montana and Wyoming.

White served in France from January 1918 to June 1919. Initially, he was with the 41st but subsequently posted to the General Headquarters, American Expeditionary Forces (A. E. F.). He was promoted to lieutenant colonel on November 13, 1918. For his services, White was appointed Knight of the French Order of the Black Star.

=== Later years ===
White was separated from Federal service on July 23, 1919, resumed his duties as Adjutant General on April 15, 1920. His first task was the reconstruction of the Oregon National Guard, in which he was promoted to colonel on June 23, 1920. He assumed command of the 82nd Infantry Brigade, a brigade composed of Oregon troops, the same day and was later promoted to brigadier general. White attended the Command and General Staff School from 1925 to 1926 and took part in training seminars organized by the War College in 1928. On January 3, 1930, he was promoted to major general and appointed to command the 41st Division.

The 41st Division's annual summer camp at Fort Lewis in June and July 1940 was extended from two weeks to three, and on September 16, 1940, with President Franklin D. Roosevelt's signing of the Selective Training and Service Act of 1940, the 41st Division was inducted into Federal service for one year. Selective service men began to arrive in February 1941. In May 1941, the 41st Division moved to the Hunter Liggett Military Reservation where June war games pitted it against Major General Joseph Stilwell's 7th Infantry Division and the 40th Infantry Division. Large scale maneuvers continued in August on the Olympic Peninsula. George A. White would become Oregon's longest-serving adjutant general, having served from 1915 to 1918 and 1920–1941.Historical Outreach Foundation

White was also a pulp writer under the name Ared White, writing the following stories (with magazine name and date)according to http://www.philsp.com/:

White, (George) Ared (1880–1941) (about) (chron.)

- Across the Lines, (ss) Adventure July 15, 1929
- The Agent from Berlin, (ss) Adventure December 1937
- At Sunrise, (ss) Adventure December 15, 1931
- Attack on America, (sl) Adventure Jun, Jul, Aug, Sep 1939
- Baited Cipher, (nv) Argosy March 23, 1935
- Buzzards, (ss) Everybody's March 1928
- By Command of, (ss) Adventure December 1, 1932
- Caissons, (ss) Everybody's July 1927
- The Cipher Trail, (ss) Adventure September 15, 1929
- Citizen Fouché, (ss) Adventure June 15, 1932
- The Courier from Spa, (nv) Argosy June 15, 1935
- Crooked Dice, (ss) Adventure May 1, 1930
- Devil Buster, (ss) Adventure February 15, 1931
- Diamond in Spain, (nv) The Blue Book Magazine December 1937
- The Duel at Charleville, (ss) Adventure December 1, 1930
- Dungeon of Spies, (nv) Argosy May 23, 1936
- The Emperor's Agent, (ss) Argosy December 29, 1934
- Escape, (sl) Adventure Feb 1, Feb 15, Mar 1 1933
- General Yu Died Gloriously, (ss) Adventure August 1938
- Gold Bars, (nv) Everybody's May 1928
- The Herr Kapitan, (sl) Adventure Aug, Sep 1933
- The House on Rue Carnot, (nv) Adventure November 15, 1929
- The Imperial Code, (nv) Argosy February 15, 1936
- Imperial Shadows, (nv) Argosy April 13, 1935
- Intercepted by Radio, (ss) Everybody's January 1927
- Lilies of the Battlefield, (nv) Munsey's Magazine December 1926
- The Loyal Grenadier, (ss) Everybody's October 1927
- A Matter of Geometry, (ss) The Popular Magazine May 7, 1915
- Mlle. Belgique, (ss) Everybody's February 1927
- Monsieur Dix, (ss) Everybody's September 1927
- Monsieur Le Falcon, (sl) Adventure Aug 1, Aug 15, Sep 1, Sep 15 1931
- The Monster of St. Gobain, (nv) Adventure September 1936
- The Order of St. Peter, (ss) Adventure June 1934
- Orders, (ss) Everybody's November 1928
- O’Vane's Chevrons, (ss) Everybody's May 1927
- O’Vane's Epa’lettes, (nv) Everybody's June 1927
- Over Paris, (nv) Adventure August 15, 1932
- The Parachute Courier, (ss) Adventure October 1933
- Parachute Spy, (nv) Adventure January 1936
- The Phantom Muscovite, (nv) Adventure February 1934
- The Prisoner of Vincennes, (na) Adventure March 15, 1930
- The Prussian Spymaster, (nv) Adventure June 15, 1930
- Pursuit, (ss) Adventure June 1937
- Secret Agent B-7, (sl) Adventure Sep 1, Sep 15, Oct 1, Oct 15, Nov 1 1934
- Secret Orders, (ss) Everybody's December 1927
- Seven Tickets to Singapore, (sl) Short Stories Nov 10, Nov 25, Dec 10, Dec 25 1938
- Silhouettes, (ss) Everybody's January 1928
- Sons of Allah, (nv) Everybody's October 1928
- The Spy at Charleville, (nv) Argosy July 21, 1934

Argosy (Canada) July 21, 1934

- The Spy at Lyons, (ss) Adventure April 1, 1932
- Spy Cargo, (nv) Adventure July 1, 1935
- The Spy Double, (nv) Argosy August 15, 1936
- Spy Master, (nv) Adventure September 1, 1935
- Spy Nest, (na) Complete Stories 2 December 1929
- The Spy Net, (sl) Adventure Aug 1, Aug 15, Sep 1 1930
- The Spy Trap, (na) Adventure April 15, 1929
- Submarine Bait, (ss) Adventure January 15, 1931
- Sun Cipher, (ss) Short Stories February 10, 1938

Short Stories (UK) mid May 1938

- Thumbs Down, (ss) Adventure May 15, 1931
- To the Colors, (ss) Everybody's April 1928
- The Trail for Jolo, (ss) Adventure November 15, 1931
- Under Paris, (ss) Adventure July 1, 1931
- Under the Front Lines, (nv) Adventure February 1, 1935
- War Bars, (ss) Short Stories May 25, 1929

Short Stories (UK) early October 1929

- The Watch on the Rhine, (ss) Everybody's March 1927
- Zeppelin Raider, (ss) Adventure September 1937

== The American Legion ==
White was one of 20 officers at the Allied Officers' Club, Rue Faubourg St. Honore, on February 16, 1919, who were credited with the founding of The American Legion. He subsequently became its first national vice commander. He founded The American Legion magazine and was its first editor. For his services to The American Legion, and for promoting friendship between the United States and France, he was awarded the French Grand Cross of the Legion of Honor on July 9, 1934. He also wrote several short stories for both pulp magazines and "slick" magazines, such as Adventure, Everybody's Magazine and The Saturday Evening Post.

== Illness and death ==
White contracted dysentery during the maneuvers at Hunter Liggett. He died from complications of the infection at his home in Clackamas, Oregon, on November 23, 1941.

== Honors ==
White's legacy included one of the National Guard's best-trained World War II era divisions. In his honor, Camp White was named after him in 1942.

== See also ==
- List of members of the American Legion

== Bibliography ==
- McCartney, William F. (1948). The Jungleers: A History of the 41st Infantry Division (1st ed.). Washington, D.C.: Infantry Journal Press. OCLC 2339701.
