= 163rd Infantry Regiment (United States) =

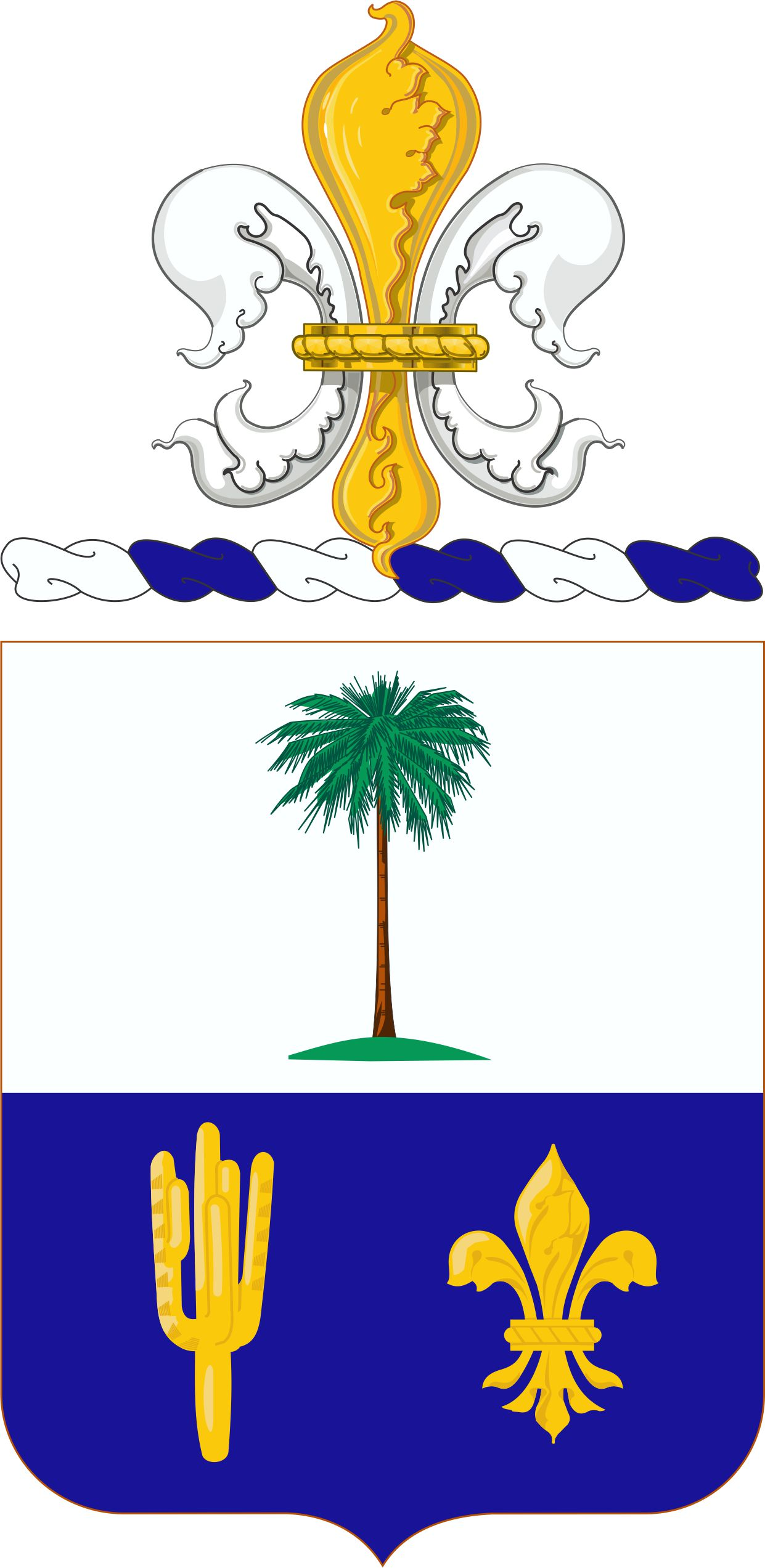
- Coat of arms
- Active: 1884
- Country: United States of America
- Branch: Montana Army National Guard
- Mottos: "Men, Do Your Duty"

Commanders
- Notable commanders: Jens A. Doe

Insignia
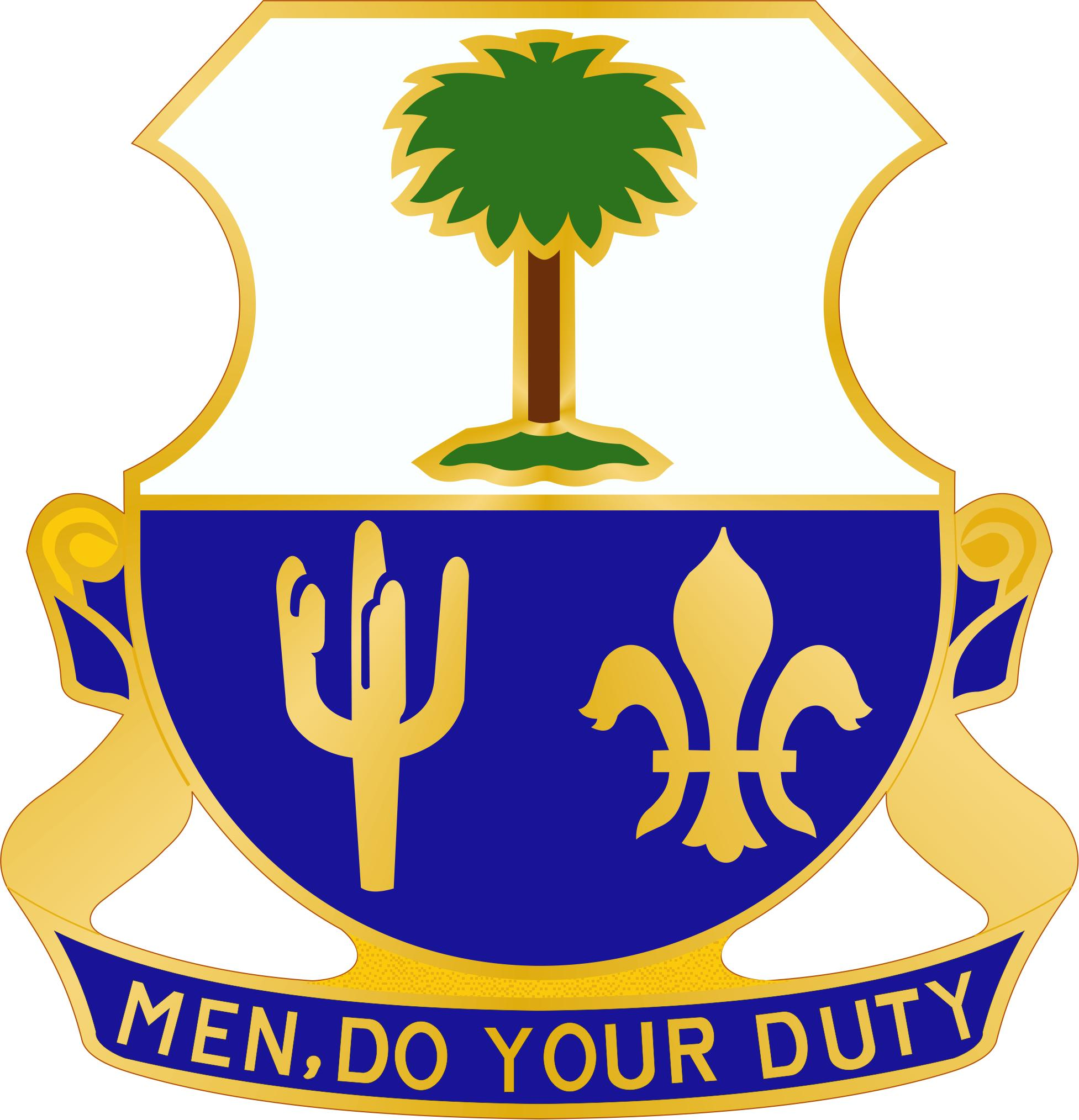
- Distinctive unit insignia

The 163rd Infantry Regiment is a regiment of the Montana National Guard. It went overseas with the 41st Infantry Division in World War II.

== History ==
=== Origins ===
The 1st Regiment of Infantry was constituted in the Montana National Guard and organized 1884 to 1887 from existing companies. It was redesignated as the 1st Montana Volunteer Infantry and mustered into federal service 5–10 May 1898 at Helena. After service in the Philippines, it mustered out 17 October 1899 at San Francisco, California. It was reorganized from 30 May 1901 to 1 December 1903 as the 2nd Infantry, Montana National Guard. It was mustered into federal service at Fort William Henry Harrison, Montana. on 27 June 1916 for the Mexican border and stationed at Douglas, Arizona, and mustered out 3 November 1916 at Fort William Henry Harrison. It was again mustered into federal service 7 April 1917 at Fort William Henry Harrison for World War I. It was later consolidated with the 3rd Battalion, 3rd Infantry, District of Columbia National Guard, reorganized and redesignated the 163rd Infantry Regiment, and assigned to the 41st Division on 19 September 1917.

=== Interwar period ===
The 163rd Infantry arrived at the port of New York on 12 February 1919 on the USS Leviathan and was demobilized on 21 February 1919 at Camp Dix, New Jersey. Pursuant to the National Defense Act of 1920, the regiment was reconstituted in the National Guard in 1921, assigned to the 41st Division, and allotted to the state of Montana. Reorganized on 1 May 1922 by redesignation of the 2nd Infantry, Montana National Guard (organized 1921–22) as the 163rd Infantry. Regimental headquarters organized on 20 January 1924 and federally recognized at Bozeman, Montana. Headquarters successively relocated to Helena, Montana, 9 March 1925, and to Billings, Montana, 29 December 1939. Company B formed in 1922 at Poplar, Montana, entirely with Native American personnel from the Fort Peck Indian Reservation. Elements called up to conduct disaster relief duties in Helena due to an earthquake in October–November 1935. The regiment conducted annual summer training most years at Fort William Henry Harrison, Helena, Montana, from 1921–39. Inducted into active federal service at home stations on 16 September 1940 and moved to Camp Murray, Washington, where it arrived on 23 September 1940. Transferred 20 March 1941 to Fort Lewis, Washington.

=== World War II ===
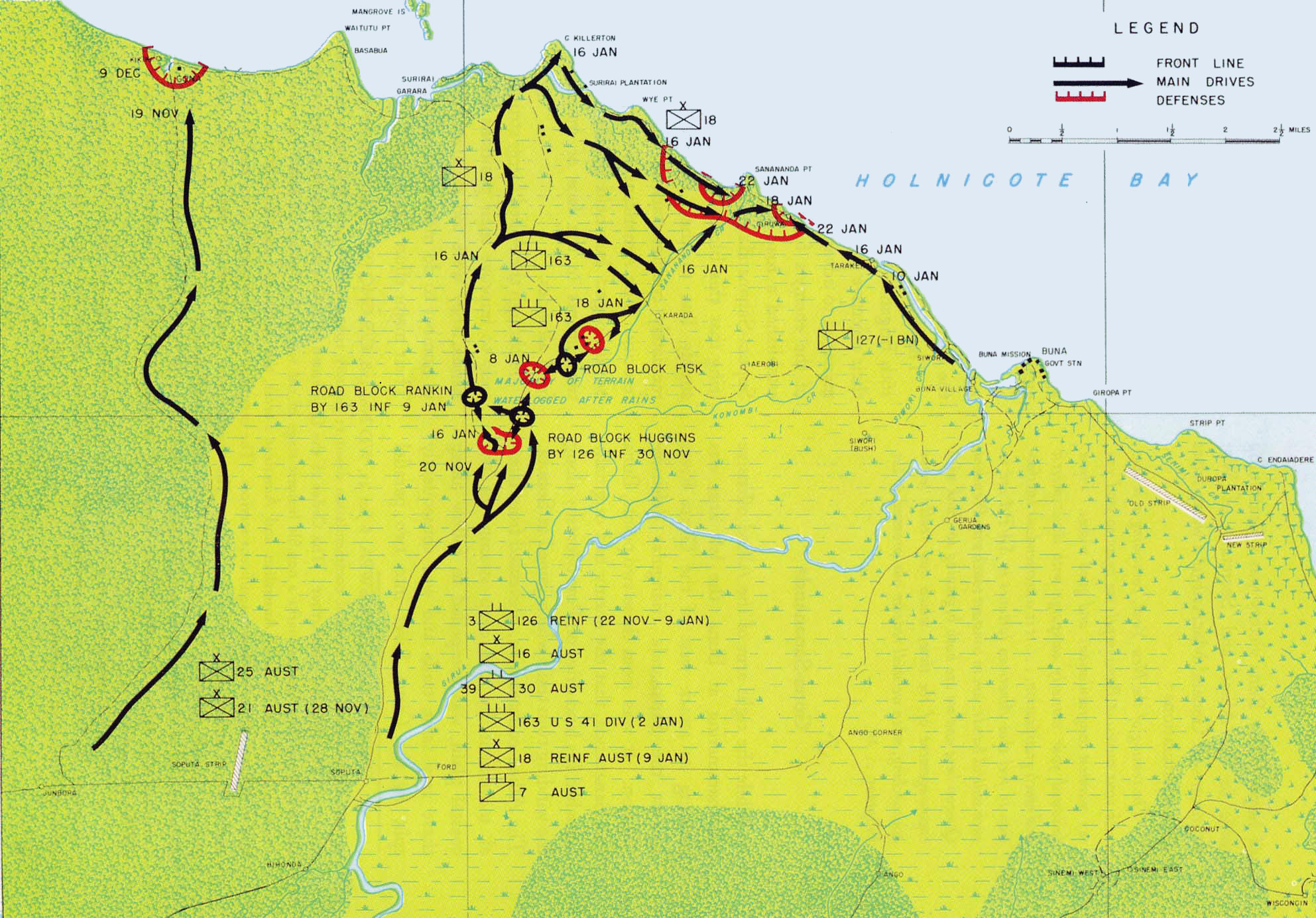
Sanananda Front, 22 November 1942 – 22 January 1943

In December 1942, General Douglas MacArthur decided to commit more American troops to the Battle of Buna-Gona. The 163rd Regimental Combat Team, under the command of Colonel Jens A. Doe, was alerted on 14 December 1942. It arrived at Port Moresby on 27 December. The first elements, which included the 1st Battalion and regimental headquarters, flew over the Owen Stanley Range to Popondetta and Dobodura on 30 December, where they came under the command of Lieutenant General Edmund Herring's Advanced New Guinea Force.

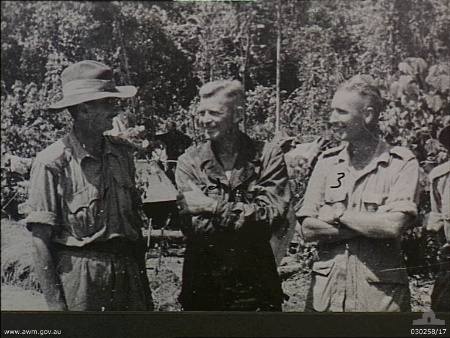
Allied commanders at Sanananda. Major General George Alan Vasey, Commanding 7th Division (left), chatting to Colonel J. A. Doe, 163rd Infantry (centre).

The 163rd Regimental Combat Team was attached to Major General George Alan Vasey's 7th Division and Doe assumed command of the Sanananda Front from Brigadier Ivan Dougherty on 3 January 1943. The front line consisted of a raised road with Japanese positions on relatively dry ground astride it, surrounded by jungle swamp. Roadblocks had been established behind the Japanese positions, but they had not been budged; both sides resupplied their positions through the swamp. Vasey's plan was for the Americans to fix the Japanese in position while he attacked with Brigadier George Wootten's 18th Infantry Brigade, supported by M3 Stuart light tanks of the 2/6th Armoured Regiment and 25 pounders of the 2/1st Field Regiment.

=== Cold War ===
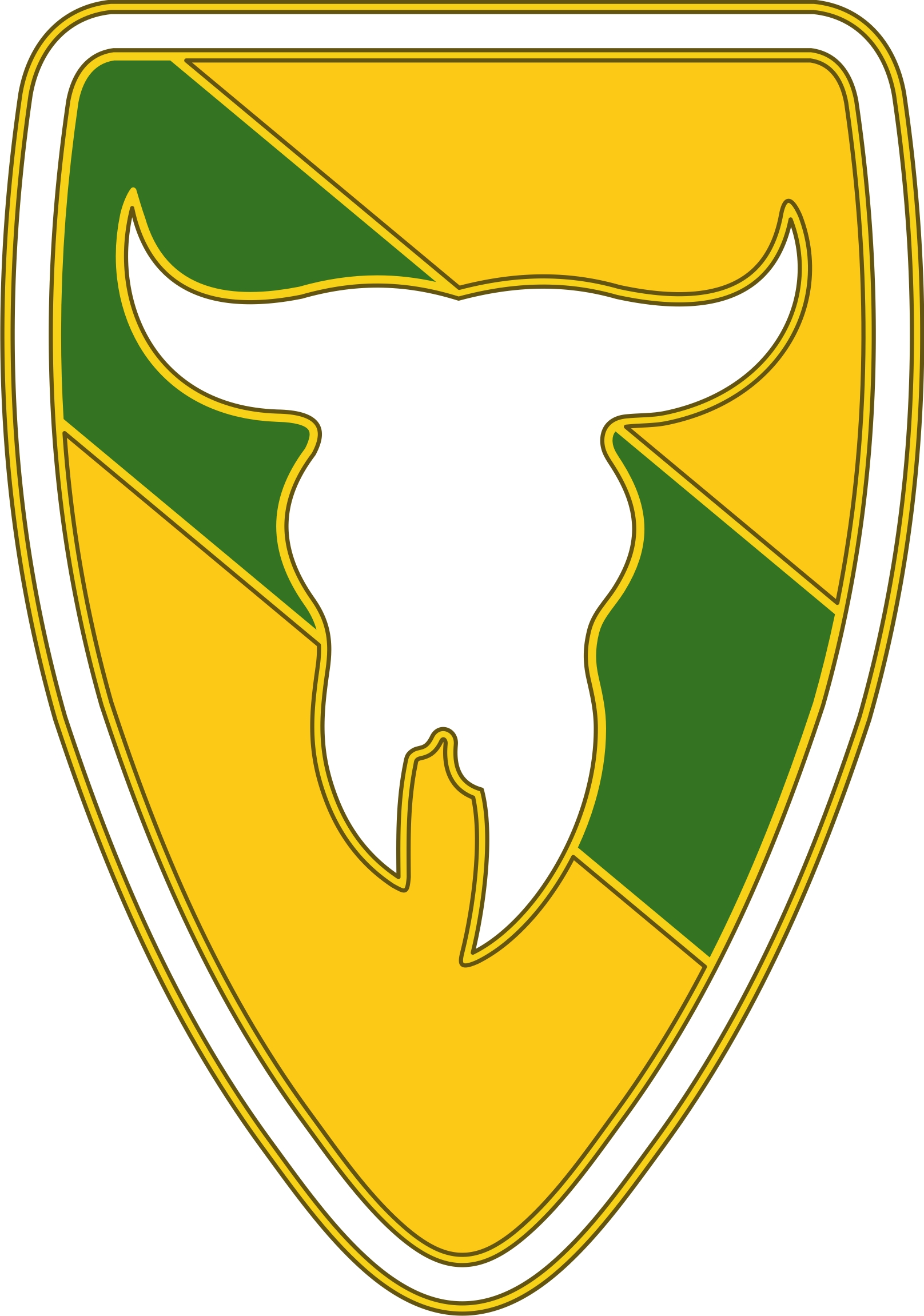
CSIB of the 163rd Armored Cavalry Brigade

The 163rd Infantry was inactivated on 31 December 1945 in Japan, and relieved from the 41st Infantry Division on 17 June 1946. It was reorganized and federally recognized on 21 April 1947 with headquarters at Bozeman. It was converted and redesignated as the 163rd Armored Cavalry on 1 March 1953. The 3rd Squadron was allotted to the Oregon Army National Guard on 1 March 1968, withdrawn 1 May 1974 from Oregon and allotted to the Nevada Army National Guard, withdrawn 1 May 1980 from Nevada and allotted to the Texas Army National Guard and withdrawn 1 July 1988 from Texas. On 1 December 1988, the regiment was reorganized as the 163rd Cavalry under the U.S. Army Combat Arms Regimental System, to consist of headquarters at Butte with the 1st and 2nd Battalions and Troop E (elements of the 163rd Armored Brigade), and the 163rd Infantry (hereafter separate lineage). Reorganized 1 June 1989 under the U.S. Army Regimental System.

The 163rd Armored Brigade was inactivated in 1997, and the regiment was assigned to the 116th Cavalry Brigade Combat Team.

=== Twenty-first century ===
In 2025-26 the regiment's 1st Battalion has its headquarters in Belgrade, Montana.

The battalion includes:

- Headquarters and Headquarters Company, 1st Battalion, 163rd Infantry Regiment, in Belgrade
- Company A, 1st Battalion, 163rd Infantry Regiment, in Billings
- Detachment 1, Company A, 1st Battalion, 163rd Infantry Regiment, in Belgrade
- Company B, 1st Battalion, 163rd Infantry Regiment, in Missoula
  - Detachment 1, Company B, 1st Battalion, 163rd Infantry Regiment, in Kalispell
- Company C, 1st Battalion, 163rd Infantry Regiment, in Great Falls
- Company I (Forward Support), 145th Brigade Support Battalion, at Fort William Henry Harrison
  - Detachment 1, Company I (Forward Support), 145th Brigade Support Battalion, in Livingston

== Distinctive unit insignia ==
- Description

A Gold color metal and enamel device 1 1/8 inches (2.86 cm) in height overall consisting of a shield blazoned: Per fess Argent and Azure, in chief a palm tree on a mount Proper and in base a giant cactus and fleur-de-lis Or. Attached below the shield is a Blue scroll doubled and inscribed "MEN, DO YOUR DUTY" in Gold letters.

- Symbolism

The palm tree represents Philippine service, the giant cactus Mexican Border duty and the fleur-de-lis service in France during World War I. Blue and white are the colors associated with Infantry and refer to the organization's combat service as the 163d Infantry during World War II.

- Background

The distinctive unit insignia was originally approved for the 163d Infantry Regiment, Montana National Guard on 8 December 1941. It was redesignated for the 163d Armored Cavalry Regiment, Montana National Guard on 17 September 1953. It was amended to change the symbolism on 21 January 1970. The insignia was updated to include both the Montana and Nevada Army National Guard on 20 January 1975. It was redesignated for the 163d Infantry Regiment, Montana Army National Guard on 1 February 1989.

== Coat of arms ==
- Blazon
- Shield

Per fess Argent and Azure, in chief a palm tree on mount Proper and in base a giant cactus and a fleur-de-lis Or.

- Crest

That for the regiments and separate battalions of the Montana Army National Guard: On a wreath of the colors Argent and Azure a fleur-de-lis the middle leaf and tie Or, and outside leaves Argent. Motto: MEN, DO YOUR DUTY.

- Symbolism
- Shield

The palm tree represents Philippine service, the giant cactus Mexican Border duty and the fleur-de-lis service in France during World War I. Blue and white are the colors associated with Infantry and refer to the organization's combat service as the 163d Infantry during World War II.

- Crest

The crest is that of the Montana Army National Guard.

- Background

The coat of arms was originally approved for the 163d Infantry Regiment, Montana National Guard on 15 December 1941. It was redesignated for the 163d Armored Cavalry Regiment, Montana National Guard on 17 September 1953. The insignia was amended to change the symbolism on 21 January 1970. It was amended to add the crest of the State of Oregon on 22 March 1971. It was amended to delete the crest of the State of Oregon and add the crest of the State of Nevada on 20 January 1975. The insignia was redesignated for the 163d Infantry Regiment and amended to delete the crest of the State of Nevada on 1 February 1989

== Campaign streamers ==
Philippine Insurrection

- Manila
- Malolos

World War I

- Streamer without Inscription

World War II

- Papua
- New Guinea (with arrowhead)
- Luzon
- Southern Philippines (with arrowhead)

== Decorations ==
- Presidential Unit Citation, streamer embroidered PAPUA
- Philippine Presidential Unit Citation streamer embroidered 17 OCTOBER 1944 TO 4 JULY 1945
- Valorous Unit Award 15 FEBRUARY 2005 TO 01 NOVEMBER 2005
- Meritorious Unit Commendation 15 NOVEMBER 2010 TO 30 AUGUST 2011
