= Senda =

Senda or SENDA may refer to:

== People ==
- Senda Berenson Abbott (1868–1954), was a figure of women's basketball and the author of the first Basketball Guide for Women
- Senda Chekir (born 1992) Tunisian handball player
- Senda Gharbi (born 1967), Tunisian swimmer
- Aisa Senda (千田 愛紗; born 1982), Japanese singer, actress and television presenter
- Akihiro Senda (仙田 晃宏; born 1982), Japanese politician
- Danny Senda (born 1981) English retired professional football defender
- Kakou Senda (千田 夏光; 1924–2000), Japanese writer
- Koreya Senda (千田 是也; 1904–1994), Japanese stage director, translator and actor
- Mitsuo Senda (千田 光男; 1940–2023), Japanese voice actor
- Sadaaki Senda (千田 貞暁; 1836–1908), Japanese Governor of Hiroshima Prefecture
- Sadasue Senda (千田 貞季; 1892–1945), Japanese lieutenant general in the Imperial Japanese Army
- Sadatoshi Senda (千田 貞敏; 1890–1944), Japanese Rear Admiral in the Imperial Japanese Navy
- Yoshihiro Senda (千田 嘉博; born 1963), Japanese castle archeologist
- Yoshio Senda (1922–2009) Canadian judoka

== Places ==
- Senda F a Bolivian town belonging to the municipality of Chimoré
- Senda del Oso a 50-kilometre rail-trail
- Senda Station a passenger railway station

== Music ==
- Senda '91 a live album by the Spanish rock band Héroes del Silencio

== Film and television ==
- La senda oscura a 1947 Argentine melodrama film
- Senda de gloria a Mexican telenovela
- Senda prohibida the first telenovela produced in Mexico
- Senda prohibida (2023 TV series) a Mexican streaming television series

== Others ==
- Special Educational Needs and Disability Act 2001
- La Senda Verde a non-government organization
- Derbi Senda a Supermotard made by Spanish company Derbi
- Grupo Senda a private bus and coach operator
