= List of Hibiya High School people =

This is a list of people associated with Tokyo, Japan's Hibiya High School or its predecessor, the First Tokyo Middle School.

== Students ==
- Natsume Sōseki (Sōseki Natsume), author
- Kōda Rohan (Rohan Kōda), author
- Ozaki Kōyō (Kōyō Ozaki), author
- Kidō Okamoto, author
- Jun'ichirō Tanizaki, author
- Yoshii Isamu (Isamu Yoshii), author
- Jirō Osaragi, author
- Choe Nam-seon, poet
- Yuzō Yamamoto, author
- Yokoyama Taikan (Taikan Yokoyama), painter
- Ryushi Kawabata, painter (after transferred to the Tokyo Third Middle School)
- Yuzuru Hiraga, naval architect, President of Tokyo Imperial Univ. in 1938
- Naomasa Yamasaki, geographer, regarded as the father of modern Japanese geography
- Shōji Hamada, potter
- Koyama Fujio (Fujio Koyama), a scholar of Japanese pottery and porcelain and Chinese ceramics
- Hisayoshi Takeda, Japanese botanist. His father was the British diplomat, Sir Ernest Satow.
- Kunio Maekawa, architect
- Hideo Kobayashi, author and literary critic
- Jun Takami, author
- Musei Tokugawa, a Japanese benshi, actor, raconteur, essayist, and radio and television personality
- Nobuyuki Abe, 36th Prime Minister of Japan, general in the Imperial Japanese Army
- Jirō Minami, general in the Imperial Japanese Army
- Shunroku Hata, field marshal in the Imperial Japanese Army
- Yukio Kasahara, lieutenant general in the Imperial Japanese Army
- Kiyohide Shima, vice admiral in the Imperial Japanese Navy
- Senda Sadasue (Sadasue Senda), lieutenant general in the Imperial Japanese Army, killed in action during Battle of Iwo Jima
- Takeichi Nishi, lieutenant colonel in the Imperial Japanese Army, killed in action during Battle of Iwo Jima
- Junichi Sasai, lieutenant JG in the Imperial Japanese Navy, Fighter ace during World War II
- Tadashi Kaneko, lieutenant commander in the Imperial Japanese Navy
- Hisatsune Sakomizu, Chief Cabinet Secretary of Japan in 1945
- Toshikazu Kase, Japan's first Ambassador to the United Nations
- Nobuhiko Ushiba, Foreign, economic charge Minister in 1977, Ambassador of Japan to U.S.A in 1970, Administrative Vice-Minister of Ministry of Foreign Affairs
- Toshizō Ido, Japanese politician, 52nd Governor of Hyōgo Prefecture
- Takeshi Watanabe, chairman of Trilateral Commission in 1976, founder governor of Asian Development Bank in 1966, Vice-Minister of Finance for International Affairs in 1949
- Michiji Tajima, Chief of Imperial Household Agency in 1949
- Toshio Yuasa, Chief of Imperial Household Agency in 2001, Administrative Vice-Minister of Ministry of Home Affairs
- Hisanori Fujita, Grand Chamberlain in 1944, general in the Imperial Japanese Navy
- Satoru Yamamoto, Grand chamberlain in 1988, head of Local Finance Bureau of Ministry of Home Affairs
- Makoto Watanabe, Grand chamberlain in 1996, Chief of Protocol of Ministry of Foreign Affairs
- Yutaka Kawashima, Grand chamberlain, Ambassador of Japan to Israel in 1996, Administrative Vice-Minister of Ministry of Foreign Affairs
- Kōichirō Matsuura, Director-General of UNESCO, Ambassador of Japan to France
- Yoshiji Nogami, Ambassador of Japan to United Kingdom, Administrative Vice-Minister of Ministry of Foreign Affairs
- Suehiko Shiono, Minister of Justice in 1937, Minister of Communications in 1939
- Shōzō Murata, entrepreneur, Minister of Communications and Minister of Railways and diplomat before, during and after World War II
- Yasumaro Shimojō, Minister of Education in 1948
- Saburo Ōkita, Minister of Foreign Affairs in 1979 (List of Magsaysay awardees)
- Yūji Tsushima, Minister of Health in 1990 and 2000
- Kōichi Katō, Chief Cabinet Secretary of Japan in 1991, Secretary of Defense in 1994
- Yukihiko Ikeda, Minister of Foreign Affairs in 1996
- Okiharu Yasuoka, Minister of Justice in 2000
- Nobutaka Machimura、 Minister of Foreign Affairs in 2004 in 2007, Chief Cabinet Secretary of Japan in 2007
- Kazuo Aichi, Secretary of Defense in 1993, Secretary of Environment in 1990
- Shitagau Noguchi, Founder of Chisso and Asahi Kasei
- Taizō Ishizaka, President of Toshiba in 1949, Chief of Nippon Keidanren in 1956
- Kōgorō Uemura, Chief of Nippon Keidanren in 1968
- Shōichirō Toyoda, President of Toyota Motor Corporation in 1982, Chief of Nippon Keidanren in 1992
- Tatsurō Toyoda, President of Toyota Motor Corporation in 1992
- Takashi Imai, President of Nippon Steel Corporation in 1993, chief of Nippon Keidanren in 1998
- Koichirō Ejiri, President of Mitsui & Co. in 1985
- Yorihiko Kojima, president and CEO of Mitsubishi Corporation in 2004
- Yasuhiko Asahina, chemist and lichenologist
- Hirofumi Uzawa, economist
- Takashi Negishi, economist, president of the Econometric Society in 1994
- Masao Maruyama, political scientist and political theorist
- Shūichi Katō, literary critic
- Toshikazu Wakatsuki, a medical doctor (List of Magsaysay awardees)
- Susumu Tonegawa, molecular biologist, 1987 Nobel Prize winner in Physiology / Medicine
- Shigeo Hirose, robotics expert
- Sōjirō Motoki, film producer
- Toshiko MacAdam, textile artist
- Jun Etō, literary critic
- Yoshikichi Furui, author
- Makoto Shinohara, composer
- Junya Sato, film director
- Sadao Nakajima, film director
- Masatoshi Akihara, film director
- Yasuo Yamada, voice actor
- Toyō Itō, architect
- Nanami Shiono, female author
- Yūko Andō, female TV newscaster
- Kanako Fukaura, actress
