= USS LST-462 =

1942 LST-1-class tank landing ship

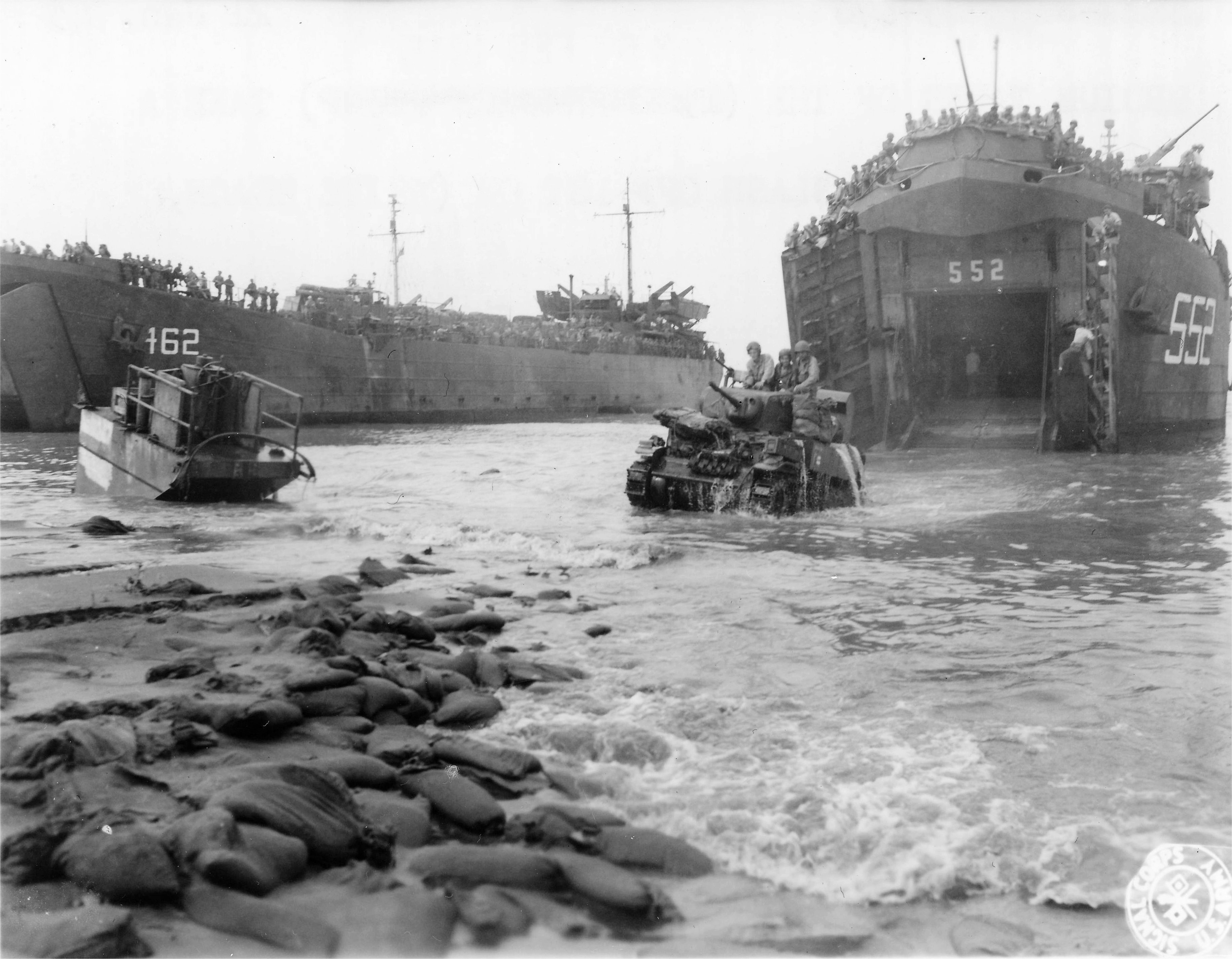
- USS LST-462, beached in the background an M3 light tank splashes off LST-552 on White Beach, Luzon, Philippine Islands, 1945

History

United States
- Name: LST-462
- Ordered: as a Type S3-M-K2 hull, MCE hull 982
- Builder: Kaiser Shipbuilding Company, Vancouver, Washington
- Yard number: 166
- Laid down: 4 October 1942
- Launched: 6 November 1942
- Commissioned: 21 February 1943
- Decommissioned: 21 March 1946
- Stricken: 1 May 1946
- Identification: Hull symbol: LST-462; Code letters: NFOZ
- Honors and awards: 5 × battle stars
- Fate: Sold for scrapping, 15 December 1948

General characteristics
- Class & type: LST-1-class tank landing ship
- Displacement: 4,080 long tons (4,145 t) full load; 2,160 long tons (2,190 t) landing
- Length: 328 ft (100 m) oa
- Beam: 50 ft (15 m)
- Draft: Full load: 8 ft 2 in (2.49 m) forward; 14 ft 1 in (4.29 m) aft; Landing at 2,160 t: 3 ft 11 in (1.19 m) forward; 9 ft 10 in (3.00 m) aft
- Installed power: 2 × 900 hp (670 kW) Electro-Motive Diesel 12-567A diesel engines; 1,700 shp (1,300 kW)
- Propulsion: 1 × Falk main reduction gears; 2 × Propellers
- Speed: 12 kn (22 km/h; 14 mph)
- Range: 24,000 nmi (44,000 km; 28,000 mi) at 9 kn (17 km/h; 10 mph) while displacing 3,960 long tons (4,024 t)
- Boats & landing craft carried: 2 or 6 x LCVPs
- Capacity: 2,100 tons oceangoing maximum; 350 tons main deckload
- Troops: 16 officers, 147 enlisted men
- Complement: 13 officers, 104 enlisted men
- Armament: Varied, ultimate armament; 2 × twin 40 mm (1.57 in) Bofors guns; 4 × single 40 mm Bofors guns; 12 × 20 mm (0.79 in) Oerlikon cannons

Service record
- Operations: Hollandia operation (15 May 1944); Western New Guinea operation; Biak Islands operation (27–29 May, 31 May–4 June, 9–13 June 1944); Noemfoor Island operation (4–11 July 1944); Cape Sansapor operation (30 July and 4, 6–19 August 1944); Morotai landing (15 September 1944); Leyte landings (13–28 October 1944); Lingayen Gulf landings (4–17 January 1945); Balikpapan operation (3–7 July 1945)
- Awards: American Campaign Medal; Asiatic–Pacific Campaign Medal; World War II Victory Medal; Philippine Republic Presidential Unit Citation; Philippine Liberation Medal

USS LST-462 was a United States Navy LST-1-class tank landing ship used in the Asiatic-Pacific Theater during World War II. As with many of her class, the ship was never named. Instead, she was referred to by her hull designation.

== Construction ==
The ship was laid down on 4 October 1942, under Maritime Commission (MARCOM) contract, MC hull 982, by Kaiser Shipyards, Vancouver, Washington; launched 6 November 1942; sponsored by Mrs. Eugene E. Blazier; and commissioned on 21 February 1943.

== Service history ==
During World War II, LST-462 was assigned to the Asiatic-Pacific theater. She took part in the Hollandia operation in May 1944; the Western New Guinea operations, the Biak Islands operation in May and June 1944, the Noemfoor Island operation in July 1944, the Cape Sansapor operation in July and August 1944, and the Morotai landing in September 1944; the Leyte operation in October 1944; the Lingayen Gulf landings in January 1945; and the Balikpapan operation in June and July 1945.

Following the war, LST-462 returned to the United States and was decommissioned on 21 March 1946, and struck from the Navy list on 1 May, that same year. On 15 December 1948, the tank landing ship was sold to Hughes Bros., Inc., of New York City, and subsequently scrapped.

== Honors and awards ==
LST-462 earned five battle stars for her World War II service.

== Notes ==
Citations

== Bibliography ==
Online resources

- "LST-462". Dictionary of American Naval Fighting Ships. Naval History and Heritage Command. This article incorporates text from this source, which is in the public domain.
- "Kaiser Vancouver, Vancouver WA". www.ShipbuildingHistory.com. 27 November 2010.
- "USS LST-462". NavSource. 9 October 2015.
