= 俊一 =

俊一 or 준일, meaning 'talented, one', may refer to:

- Chun Yat, a Cantonese given stage name for Hong Kong actor Anson Leung (born 1979) who appeared in Flaming Butterfly
- Jun-il, a Korean given name for North Korean professional footballer Ri Jun-Il (born 1987)
- Shun'ichi, a masculine Japanese given name
- Toshikazu, a masculine Japanese given name
