= Sankō Shrine =

Shinto shrine in Osaka Prefecture, Japan

Sankō Shrine 三光神社
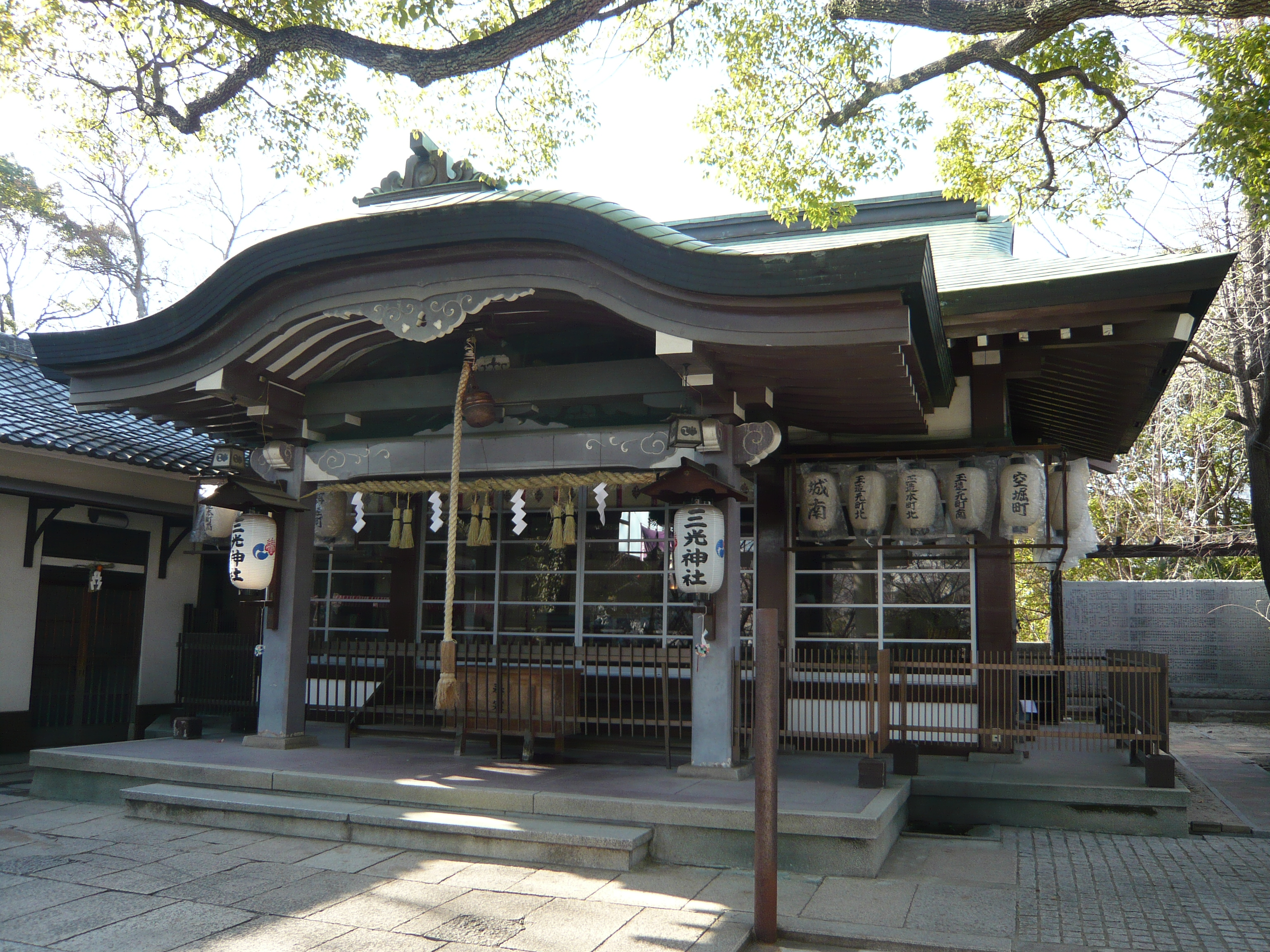
- The haiden or prayer hall

- Location within Japan

Religion
- Affiliation: Shinto
- Deity: Amaterasu Omikami, Tsukuyomi-no-Mikoto, Susanoo-no-Mikoto
- Festival: "Chūbu-yoke" (June 1–7)

Location
- Interactive map of Sankō Shrine 三光神社
- Coordinates: 34°40′23″N 135°31′46″E

Architecture
- Established: 5th century

Website
- www.sankoujinja.com

Sankō Shrine (三光神社, Sankō-jinja) is a Shinto shrine on a hill named Mt. Sanada (真田山, Sanada-yama) in Tennōji-ku, Osaka, Japan. It is notable for being the possible location of a legendary tunnel used during the 17th century Siege of Osaka.

== History ==
The temple is said to have been built in the 5th century CE, during the reign of Emperor Hanzei. In the past it was also known as Himeyama Shrine, but has become more commonly known as the Sanko Shrine of Mt. Sanada. According to the shrine's history, the current head priest is the 86th head in the shrine's lineage.

== Grounds ==
There is a statue of Sanada Yukimura on the grounds in recognition of the belief that the area is the location of the Sanada Maru, a fortification defended by the Toyotomi clan during the 1614 Winter Campaign of the Siege of Osaka. Within the grounds of the shrine is the opening of a tunnel, the "Sanada-no Nuke-ana" (真田の抜け穴), that is said to have connected the Sanada Maru to Osaka Castle during the siege. The number of worshippers visiting the shrine has increased dramatically since the shrine has been featured in the 2016 NHK taiga drama Sanada Maru. However, recent research by Yoshihiro Senda, Professor of Archeology and President of Nara University, concluded that the Sanada Maru was likely located several hundred metres away from the shrine. Senda further found that the tunnel on the shrine's grounds is not the legendary passage, but more likely a trench dug by the attacking Maeda forces.

== Festivals ==
In June each year the shrine hosts the "Chūbu-yoke" festival, a week-long festival devoted to warding off the ill effects (e.g. paralysis and numbness) caused by stroke. During the rare event, a ring of grass measuring two metres in height is erected within the temple's hall. After receiving a blessing from the priest, the worshipper steps through the ring while praying for good health and long life.

== Access ==
A small shopping street commonly referred to as the "Tamatsukuri Yukimura Road" leads from Tamatsukuri Station to the shrine. The station is connected to JR West's Osaka Loop Line and the Osaka subway's Nagahori Tsurumi-ryokuchi Line.

== Gallery ==
Entrance to Sanko Shrine

A tunnel entrance, said to have been a tunnel to Osaka Castle
