= Sadatoshi =

- Gender: Male

Origin
- Origin: Japanese
- Meaning: Different meanings depending on the kanji used

Sadatoshi (written: 貞敬, 貞利, 定俊 or 贞敏) is a masculine Japanese given name. Notable people with the name include:

- Sadatoshi Senda (千田 贞敏) (died 1944), Imperial Japanese Navy admiral
- Sadatoshi Sugawara (菅原 貞敬) (born 1939), Japanese volleyball player
- Sadatoshi Tomioka (富岡 定俊) (1900–1970), Imperial Japanese Navy admiral
