= Toshikazu =

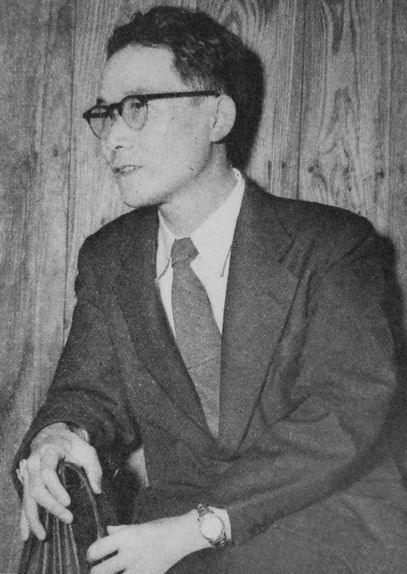
- Toshikazu Wakatsuki (1910–2006), Japanese medical doctor
- Pronunciation: toɕikadzɯ (IPA)
- Gender: Male

Origin
- Origin: Japanese
- Meaning: Different meanings depending on the kanji used

Other names
- Alternative spelling: Tosikazu (Kunrei-shiki) Tosikazu (Nihon-shiki) Toshikazu (Hepburn)

Toshikazu is a masculine Japanese given name.

== Written forms ==
Toshikazu can be written using different combinations of kanji characters. Some examples:

- 敏一, "agile, one"
- 敏和, "agile, harmony"
- 敏多, "agile, many"
- 敏数, "agile, number"
- 俊一, "talented, one"
- 俊和, "talented, harmony"
- 俊多, "talented, many"
- 俊数, "talented, number"
- 利一, "benefit, one"
- 利和, "benefit, harmony"
- 利多, "benefit, many"
- 利数, "benefit, number"
- 年一, "year, one"
- 年和, "year, harmony"
- 寿一, "long life, one"
- 寿和, "long life, harmony"

The name can also be written in hiragana としかず or katakana トシカズ.

== Notable people with the name ==
- Toshikazu Ichimura (市村 俊和, born 1941), Japanese aikidoka.
- Toshikazu Irie (入江 利和, born 1984), Japanese footballer.
- Toshikazu Kase (加瀬 俊一, 1903–2004), Japanese civil servant and diplomat.
- Toshikazu Katayama (片山 敏一, born 1913), Japanese figure skater.
- Toshikazu Kato (加藤 寿一, born 1981), Japanese footballer.
- Toshikazu Kawasaki (川崎 敏和, born 1955), Japanese origami artist.
- Toshikazu Nakamichi (中道 紀和, born 1971), Japanese rugby union player.
- Toshikazu Sano (佐野 敏一, born 1940), Japanese football referee.
- Toshikazu Sugihara (杉原 敏一, born 1964), Japanese golfer.
- Toshikazu Sunada (砂田 利一, born 1948), Japanese mathematician and writer.
- Toshikazu Saito (齋藤 俊一, ????–1582), Japanese samurai.
- Toshikazu Wakatsuki (若月 俊一, 1910–2006), Japanese medical doctor.
- Toshikazu Yamanishi (山西 利和, born 1996), Japanese racewalker.
- Toshikazu Yamashita (山下 敏和, born 1977), Japanese sport shooter.
