= Derbi =

Spanish motorcycle manufacturer

- Derbi Logo
- Type: Subsidiary
- Industry: Powersports
- Founded: 1922; 104 years ago
- Founder: Simeó Rabasa i Singla
- Defunct: 2018; 8 years ago
- Headquarters: Barcelona, Spain
- Products: motorcycles, scooters, mopeds, recreations vehicles
- Parent: Piaggio Group
- Website: www.derbi.com

Derbi was a manufacturer of motorcycles, scooters, mopeds and recreational all-terrain vehicles produced by Nacional Motor S.A.U., currently integrated into the Italian (2009) Piaggio Group.

== History ==
Derbi's origins began with a little bicycle workshop in the village of Mollet near Barcelona, founded in 1922 by Simeó Rabasa i Singla (1901–1988). The focus remained the repair and hire of bicycles until May 1944 when Rabasa formed a limited liability company named Bicycletas Rabasa with the aim of moving into manufacturing bicycles. The venture proved very successful and in 1946, supported by its profits, work began on a motorised version. More moped than motorcycle, this first model, the 48cc SRS included plunger rear suspension, and a motorcycle type gas tank and exhaust system. The SRS proved so successful it prompted a change in the company's direction, and on November 7, 1950, the company changed its name to the Nacional Motor SA. Just prior to this, at that summer's Barcelona Trade Fair, the company unveiled its first real motorcycle, the Derbi 250.

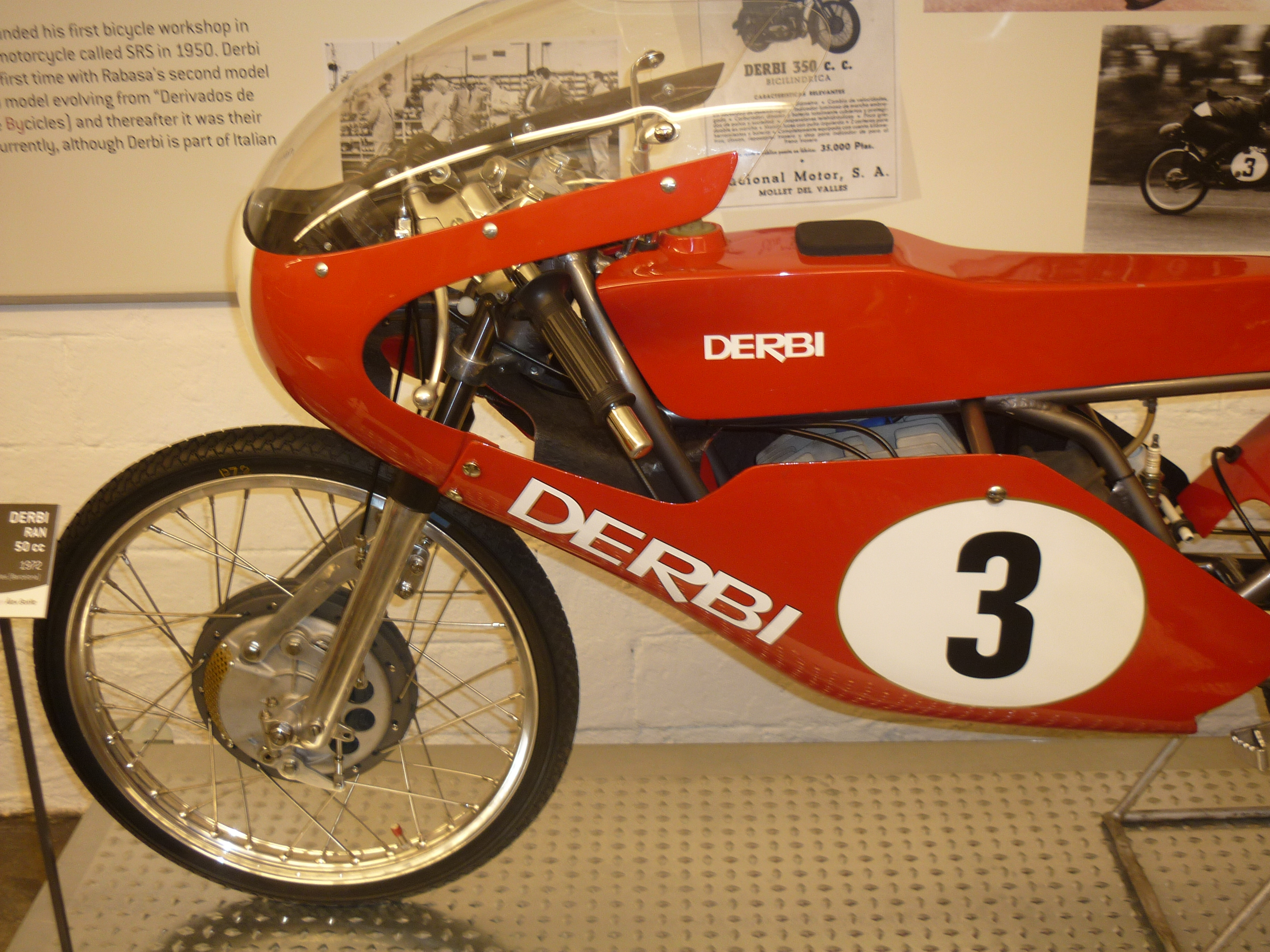
1972 Derbi 50 cc

First win in 1968 with Barry Smith at TT race, Derbi successfully competed in Grand Prix motorcycle racing, winning 50cc world championships in 1969, 1970 and 1972. When the 50cc class was increased to an 80cc displacement in 1984, Derbi would claim four consecutive world championships between 1986 and 1989, before the class was discontinued in Grand Prix competition. The firm also experienced racing success in 125cc Grand Prix competitions, winning world championships in 1971, 1972, 1988, 2008 and 2010.

== Modern history ==
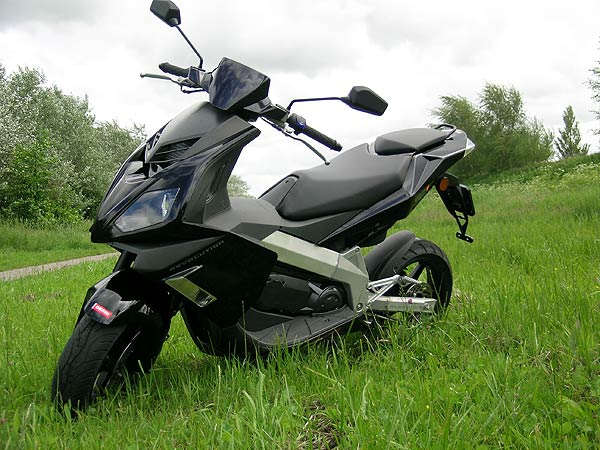
A 2005 model Derbi GP1 Scooter

Unlike Ossa, Bultaco, and Montesa, Derbi successfully met the challenges that followed the Spanish transition to democracy and Spain's entry into the European Community. Simeó Rabasa i Singla died in 1988 but the company remained independent until 2001, when it was bought out by the Piaggio group.

== The Derbi name ==
The name Derbi is an acknowledgement of the company's history, and is an amalgamation from the Catalan-phrase Derivats de BIcicletes (derivatives of bicycles).

== Past models ==
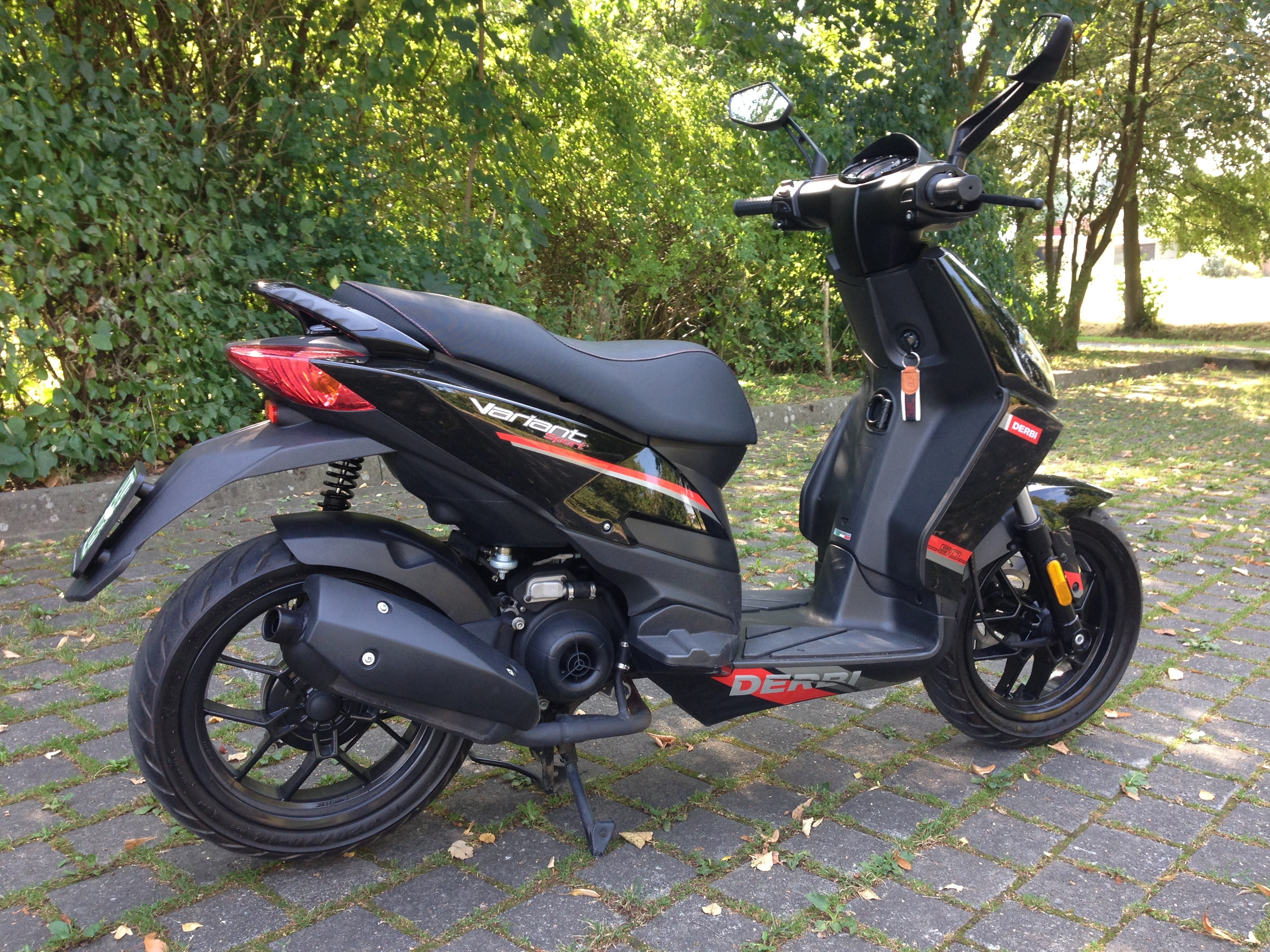
Derbi Variant Sport

Pedal Mopeds

- Derbi Variant SL
- Derbi Variant SLE
- Derbi Variant TT
- Derbi Variant Sport
- Derbi DS50, step through scooter
- Derbi Diablo C4, enduro styling
- Derbi Diablo C5, enduro styling (using the Variant engine and transmission)
- Derbi RD50, enduro styling (using the Variant engine and transmission)
- Derbi Laguna, road styling (some models using the Variant engine and transmission)
- Derbi Laguna Sport

Road

- Derbi T 250 6V
- Derbi Cross City 125
- Derbi Etx 150
- Derbi Stx 150
- Derbi Terra Adventure 125

Scooters

- Derbi Manhattan
- Derbi Hunter
- Derbi Predator
- Derbi Paddock
- Atlantis
- Boulevard 50
- Boulevard 125
- Bullet

== Current models ==
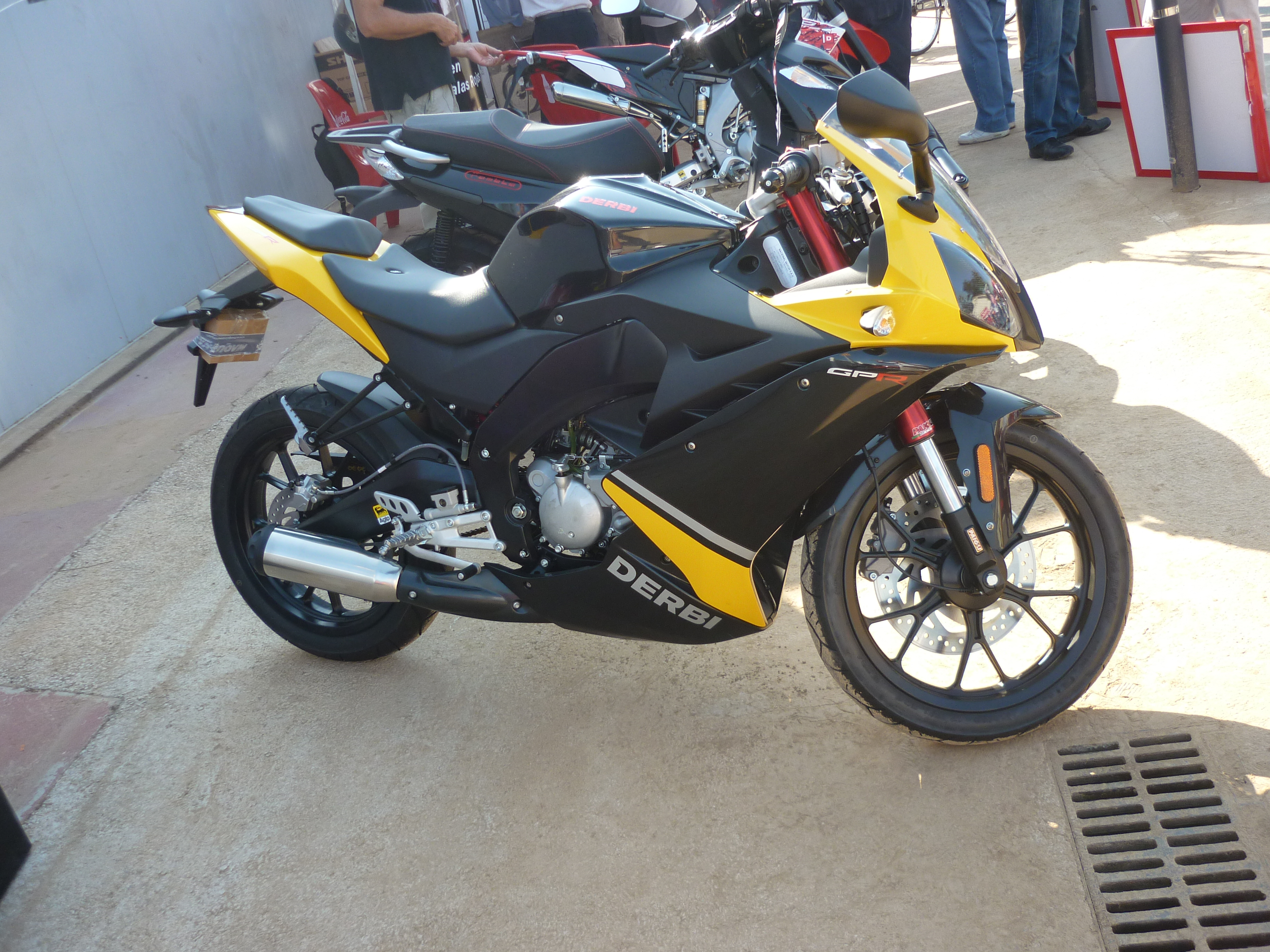
Derbi GPR 50

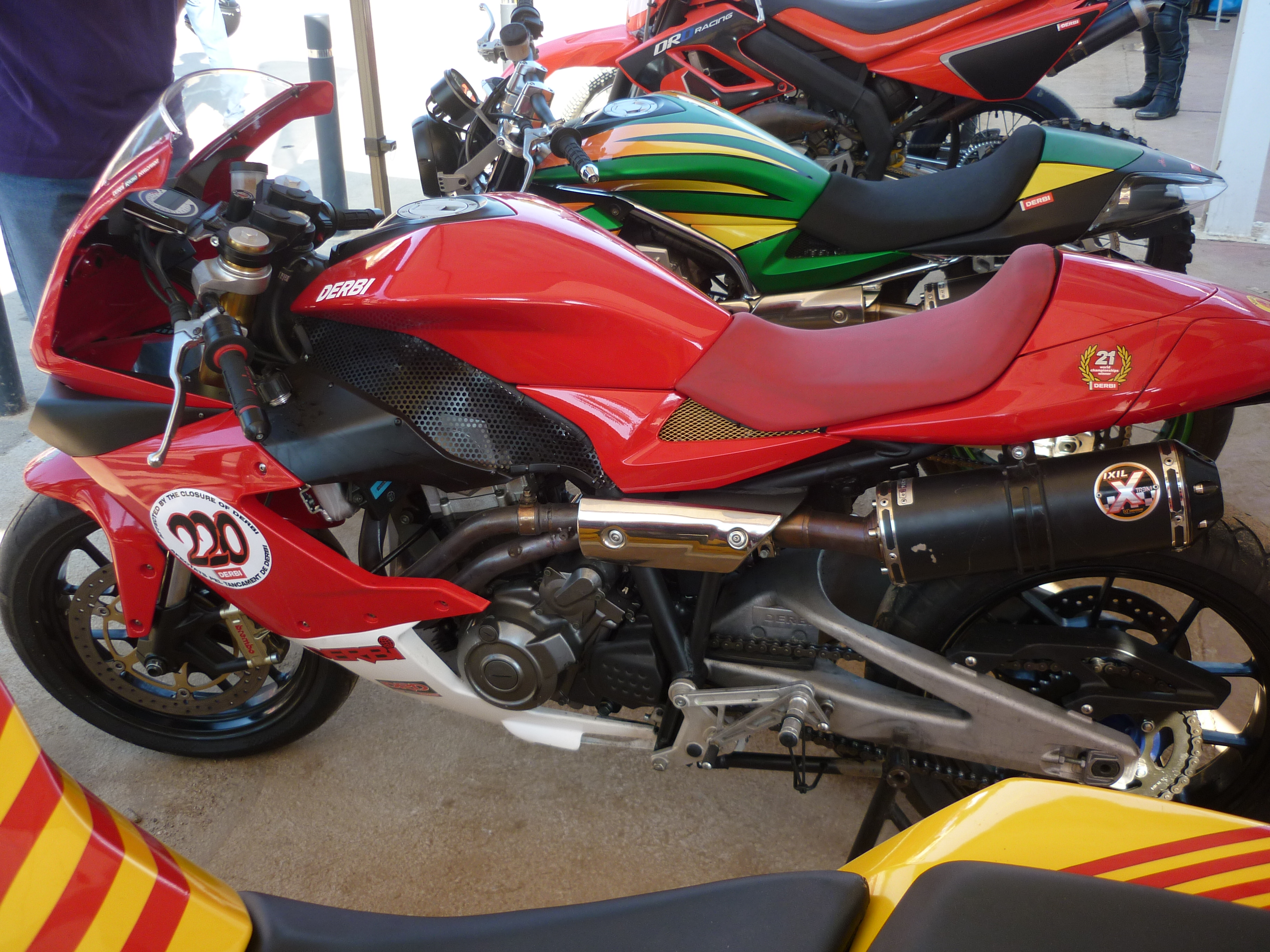
Derbi Mulhacén 659

Road

- Derbi GPR 50
- Derbi GPR 125
- Derbi GPR Nude
- Derbi Mulhacén 125
- Derbi Mulhacén Café 125
- Derbi Mulhacén 659

Supermoto

- Derbi Senda
- Derbi Senda X-Race/X-Treme
- Derbi Senda 125 SM
- Derbi Senda DRD Pro
- Derbi Senda Xtreme SM/R

Scooters

- GP1 50
- GP1 125
- GP1 250
