= USS LST-552 =

1944 LST-542-class tank landing ship

History

United States
- Name: USS LST-552
- Builder: Missouri Valley Bridge and Iron Company, Evansville, Indiana
- Laid down: 19 January 1944
- Launched: 14 March 1944
- Sponsored by: Mrs. Robert A. Burns
- Commissioned: 19 April 1944
- Decommissioned: 19 April 1946
- Stricken: 1 May 1946
- Honors and awards: Four battle stars for World War II
- Fate: Sold for scrapping 3 November 1947

General characteristics
- Class & type: LST-542-class tank landing ship
- Displacement: 1,625 long tons (1,651 t) light; 4,080 long tons (4,145 t) full (seagoing draft with 1,675-ton load
- Length: 328 ft (100 m)
- Beam: 50 ft (15 m)
- Draft: Unloaded 2 ft 4 in (0.71 m) forward; 7 ft 6 in (2.29 m) aft; Full load: 8 ft 2 in (2.49 m) forward; 14 ft 1 in (4.29 m) aft; Landing with 500-ton load: 3 ft 11 in (1.19 m) forward; 9 ft 10 in (3.00 m) aft
- Installed power: 1,800 horsepower (1.34 megawatts)
- Propulsion: Two 900-horsepower (0.67-megawatt) General Motors 12-567 diesel engines, two shafts, twin rudders
- Speed: 12 knots (22 km/h; 14 mph)
- Range: 24,000 nautical miles (44,448 kilometerss) at 9 knots while displacing 3,960 tons
- Boats & landing craft carried: 2 x LCVPs
- Capacity: 1,600–1,900 tons cargo depending on mission
- Troops: 16 officers, 147 enlisted men
- Complement: 7 officers, 104 enlisted men
- Armament: 2 × twin 40 mm gun mounts; 4 × single 40-millimeter gun mounts; 12 × 20 mm guns

USS LST-552 was a United States Navy LST-542-class tank landing ship in commission from 1944 to 1946.

== Construction and commissioning ==
LST-552 was laid down on 19 January 1944 at Evansville, Indiana, by the Missouri Valley Bridge and Iron Company. She was launched on 14 March 1944, sponsored by Mrs. Robert A. Burns, and commissioned on 19 April 1944.

== Service history ==
During World War II, LST-552 was assigned to the Pacific Theater of Operations. She participated in the capture and occupation of the southern Palau Islands in September and October 1944. She then took part in the Philippines campaign, participating in the Leyte landings in October and November 1944 and the landings at Zambales and Subic Bay in January 1945.

LST-552 was damaged in a Japanese air attack on Leyte Gulf on 24 October 1944. A Wildcat fighter pilot, Lt. Ralph Elliott off USS Savo Island, shot down a twin-engine bomber that he thought crashed into an LST. Other information indicates that 552 sustained bomb damage.

She then participated in the assault on and occupation of Okinawa Gunto in April 1945.

Following the war, LST-552 performed occupation duty in the Far East – during which Lieutenant Robert J. McKenna succeeded Lieutenant Sandvigen as commanding officer on 23 September 1945 – until mid-October 1945, when she departed to return to the United States.

== Decommissioning and disposal ==
LST-552 was decommissioned on 19 April 1946 and stricken from the Navy List on 1 May 1946. On 3 November 1947, she was sold to Dulien Steel Products, Inc. of Seattle, Washington, for scrapping.

== Honors and awards ==
LST-552 received four battle stars for her World War II service.
