= Kuzume Naoyuki =

Japanese general

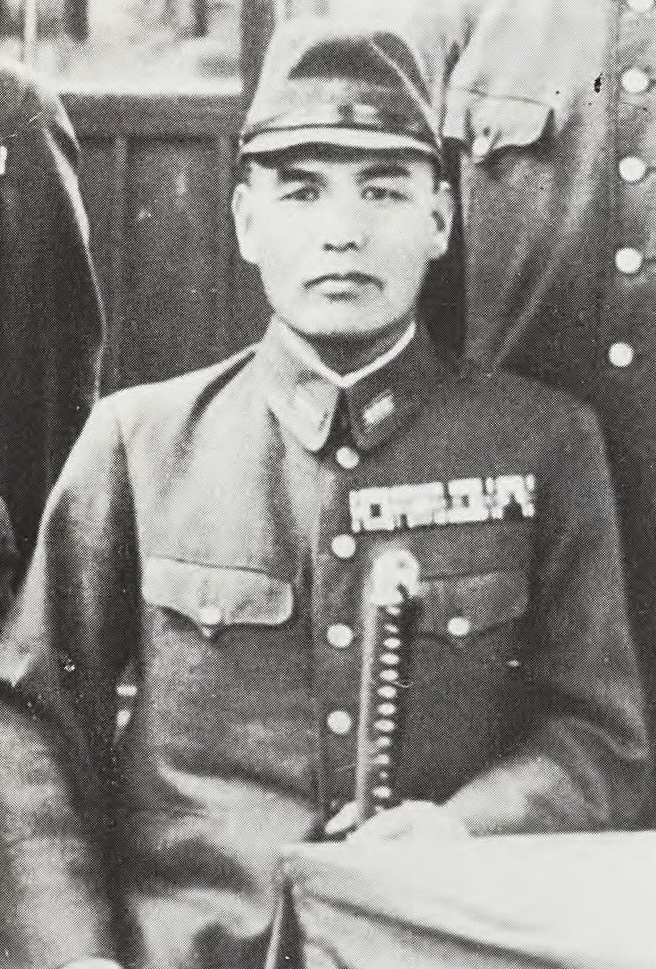
- Native name: 葛目 直幸
- Born: October 10, 1890
- Died: June 28, 1944 (aged 53) Biak
- Allegiance: Empire of Japan
- Branch: Imperial Japanese Army
- Rank: Lieutenant General
- Commands: IJA 22nd Infantry Regiment
- Conflicts: World War II; New Guinea campaign; Battle of Biak ‡‡

Kuzume Naoyuki (葛目 直幸, Naoyuki Kuzume; October 10, 1890 – June 28, 1944) was a colonel in the Imperial Japanese Army.

== Biography ==
Kuzume was the commander of defenses on the island of Biak, near the Japanese-held bases in Papua New Guinea. He led the IJA 22nd Infantry Regiment, over 3,400 troops. He made a desperate defense of the island, covering it with pillboxes, bunkers, and spider holes. Nevertheless, the US troops were able to successfully fight their way to the east caves. On June 28, Kuzume decided to commit seppuku, the ritual suicide, since the Japanese had little chance of victory. He was posthumously promoted as lieutenant general.

== Works cited ==
- 『高知県人名事典新版』刊行委員会 ("The New Biographical Dictionary Kōchi Prefecture" Publication Board), ed. (September 1999). 高知県人名事典 [Biographical Dictionary of Kōchi Prefecture] (in Japanese) (新版 ed.). The Kōchi Shinbun Company. ISBN 4-87503-285-4.
- Ikuhiko Hata, ed. (August 2005). 日本陸海軍総合事典 [Comprehensive Encyclopedia of the Japanese Army and Navy] (in Japanese) (2nd ed.). University of Tokyo Press. ISBN 4-13-030135-7.
