= Derbi Senda =

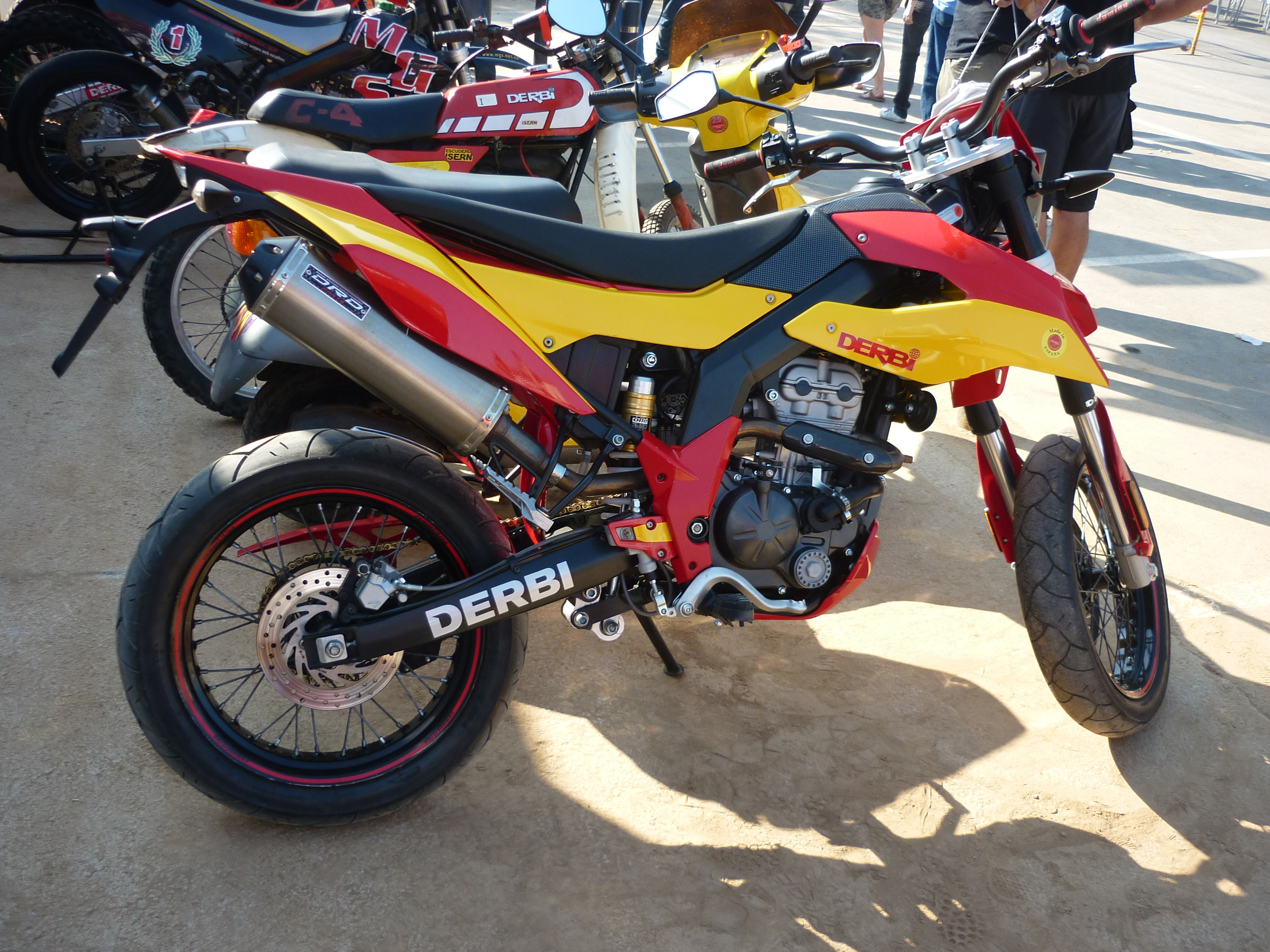
- Derbi Senda DRD 125 SM
- Manufacturer: Derbi
- Also called: Senda Xtreme SM/R, Senda DRD, Senda SM
- Parent company: Piaggio
- Production: 1994–2020
- Class: Supermotard
- Engine: 50–125 cc (3.1–7.6 cu in) liquid cooled, two stroke single cylinder
- Compression ratio: 11.5:1
- Transmission: 6-speed Sequential Manual. Straight Cut Gears
- Suspension: Ø40 mm hydraulic fork with leading axle; wheel travel 195 mm Rear: hydraulic monoshock; Non-adjustable; wheel travel 180 mm
- Brakes: Front: 260mm drilled or slotted steel disc (depending on model); single-piston caliper Rear: 180 mm drill or slotted steel disc (depending on model); single-piston caliper
- Tires: Front: 100/80-17; Rear: 130/70-17

The Derbi Senda is a Supermotard made by Spanish company Derbi. It is one of the most popular bikes made by Derbi due to its appeal to young riders, its styling and its amazing tuning possibilities.

== History ==
The Derbi Senda was launched in 1994, and throughout the 2000s, it went under several design evolutions. The early models featured a steel perimeter frame, which was later refined to improve rigidity and handling. In 2006, Derbi introduced a significant restyling, giving the bike sharper bodywork and a more modern aesthetic that aligned it with larger enduro and supermoto machines.

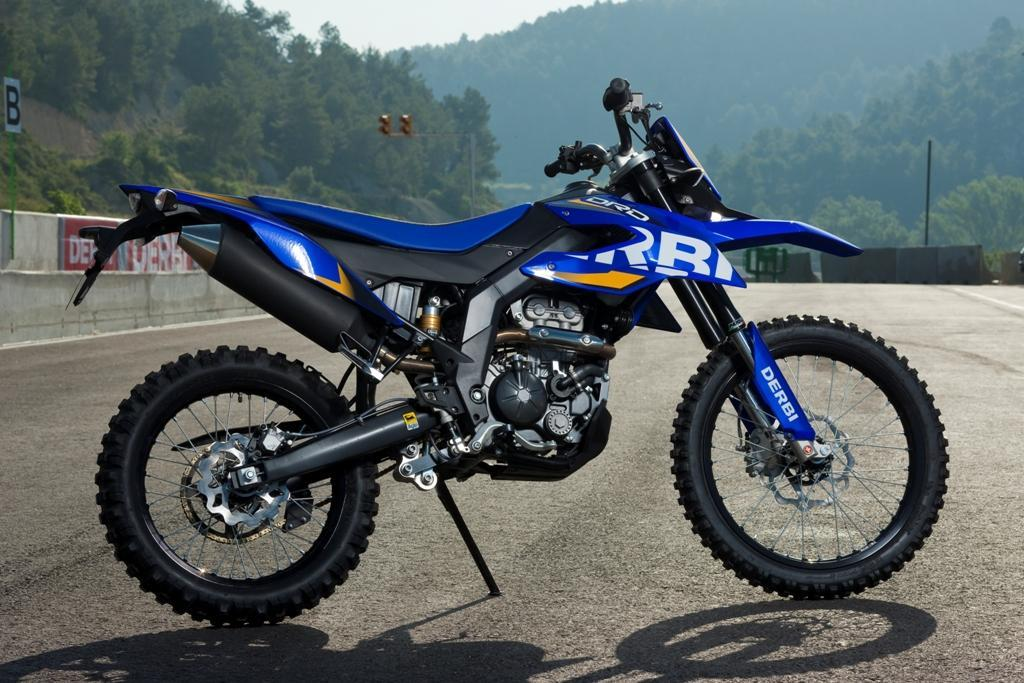
Derbi Senda DRD 125 R

The Senda is widely recognized for its two main variants:

- Senda R (Enduro): Designed for off-road use, featuring off-road tires and long-travel suspension.
- Senda SM (Supermotard): Designed for asphalt, featuring road tires and stiffer suspension settings.

== Engine ==
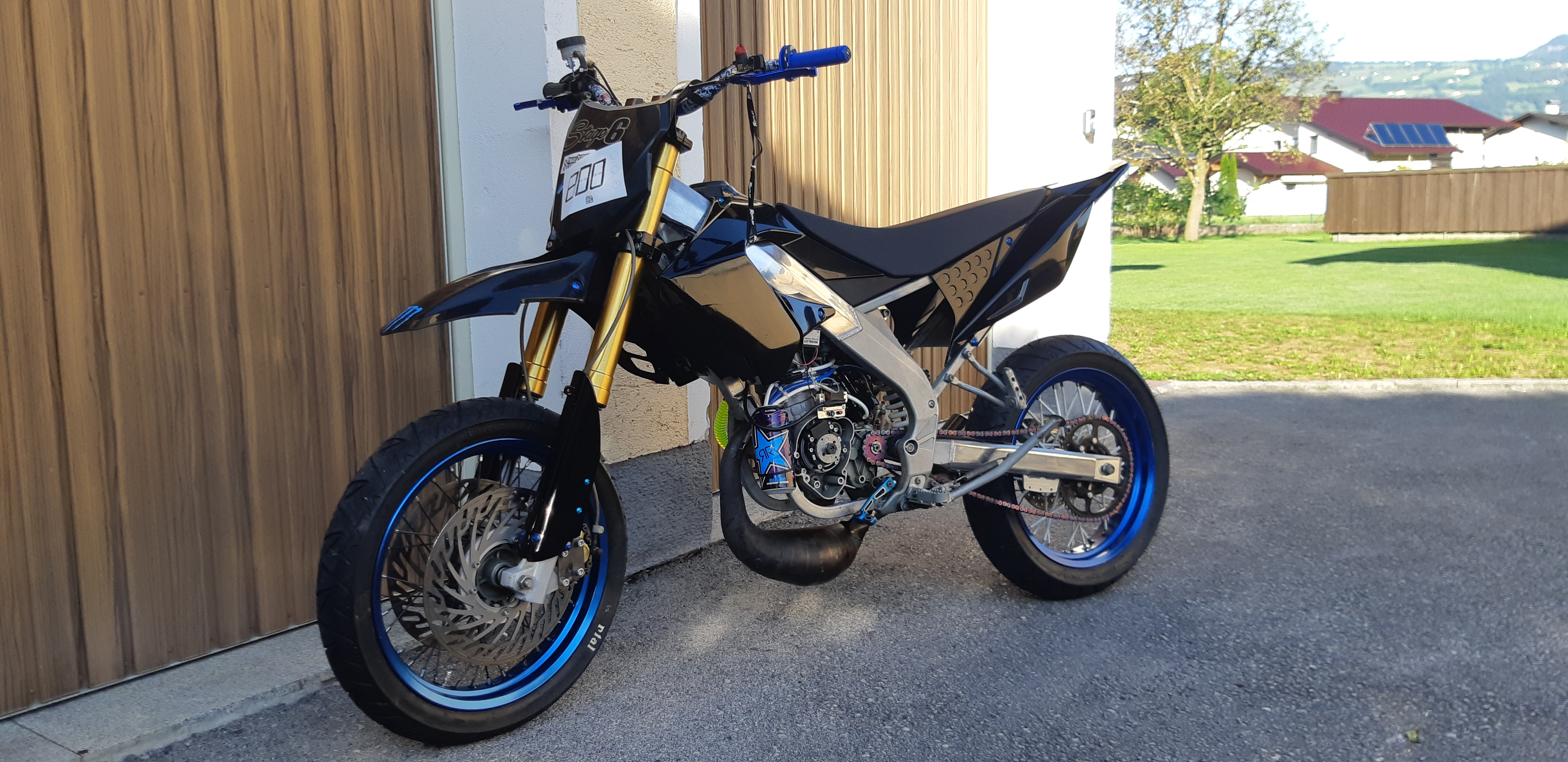
A tuned Derbi Senda DRD 50 SM

The bike itself uses an EBS/EBE, D50B0 or D50B1 engine which produces a staggering 5bhp. The Derbi Senda is identically constructed as the Gilera SMT 50. Between 1995 and 2005, Derbi was produced with an EBS / EBE engine, and after 2005, D50B0 / D50B1 engines were used until 2023.

=== Derbi Senda 50 Specifications ===
50 cc single cylinder, four-petal plastic reed valve case induction and two-stroke injection (automix) carburetor fueled.

Engine displacement – 49.76 cc
Bore/stroke – 39,88×40 mm
Compression ratio – 11.5:1
Clutch – Wet, multiple plate
Starting – Kickstart
Exhaust
Rotor Ignition/Generator = 85w/120w
Cooling system – liquid-cooled
Fuel tank size = 7.45 litres
Fuel system – Carburetor Dell'Orto PHVA 17.5 mm

Main jet = 85
Needle Jet = A13, notch #2
Idle jet = 30 Fuel capacity: 7.45 liters

Transmission

1st = 1st 11/34
2nd = 2nd 15/30
3rd = 3rd 18/27
4th = 4th 20/24
5th = 5th 22/23
6th = 6th 23/22
Primary drive = 21/78

Sprockets

Front = 14 Teeth
Rear = 52 Teeth
Overall Final Drive ratio = 14/52

Spark plug = NGK BR9ES/BR9EG/BR9EIX/BR8ES

Gap = .6-7 mm

Wheelbase = 55.354 in (1,406 mm)
Length = 79.68 in (2,024 mm)
Width = 80.511 in (2,045 mm)
Height = 32.677 in (830 mm)
Tires = Front: 100/80 - 17 inch; Rear: 130/70 - 17-inch

=== Restriction ===
Restriction varies depending on the country and dealer, person, or company the bike is purchased from. The engine is usually restricted in the following ways:

CDI unit restricted to 9,400 RPM

Carburetor

'Strangle' baffle/plate in Air filter manifold

[74 Main jet
Exhaust

Exhaust fume/pressure outlet pipes

Sprockets

Front; reduced to 11/53 12/53 or 14/54
