= Sadatoshi Senda =

Imperial Japanese Navy vice admiral (1890–1944)

- 千田 貞敏
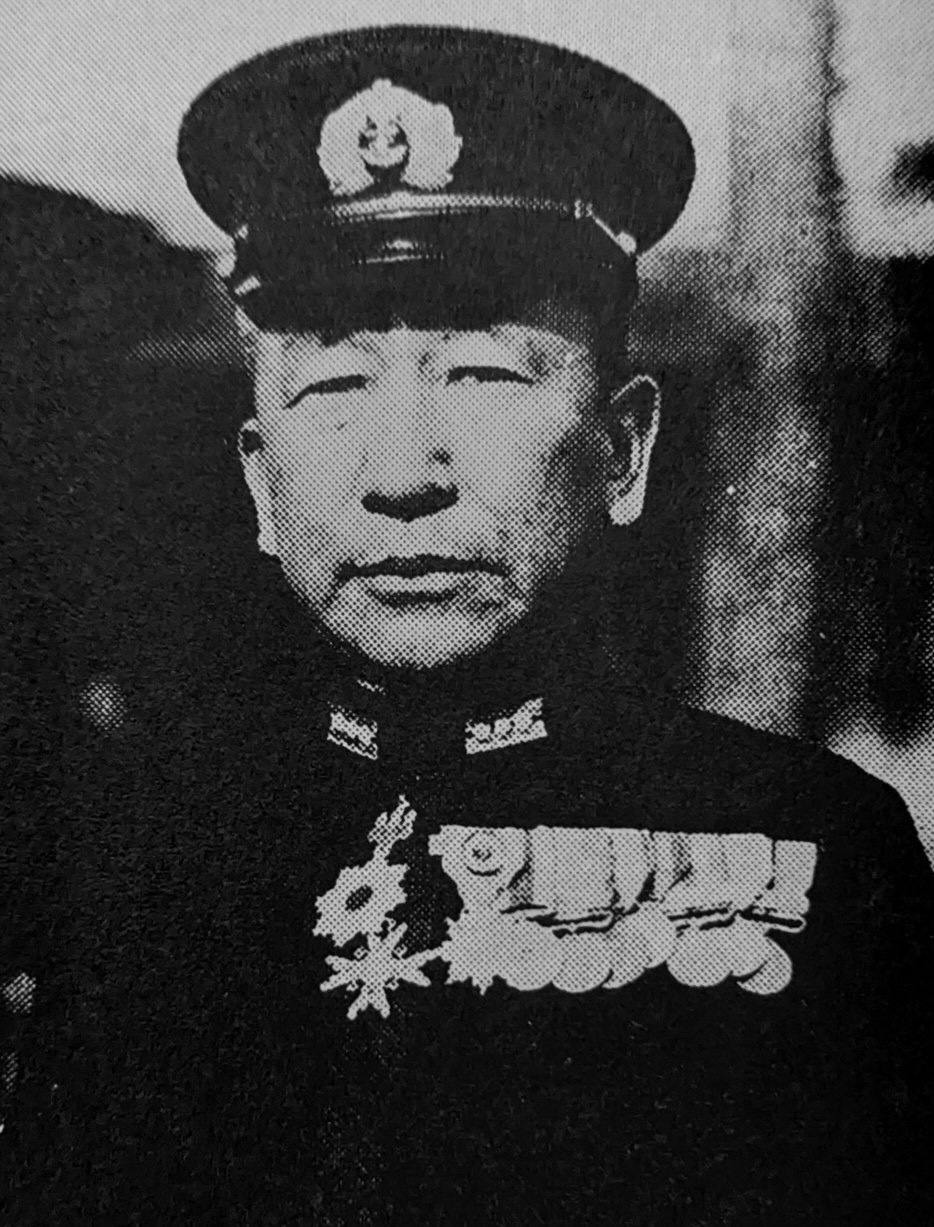
- Born: July 22, 1890
- Died: December 25, 1944 (aged 54); Biak
- Military career
- Allegiance: Empire of Japan
- Branch: Imperial Japanese Navy
- Rank: Vice admiral
- Commands: 28th Marine Department
- Conflicts: World War II; New Guinea campaign; Battle of Biak †

Sadatoshi Senda (千田 貞敏, Senda Sadatoshi; July 22, 1890 – December 25, 1944) was a vice admiral in the Imperial Japanese Navy during World War II.

== Biography ==
Senda was born on July 22, 1890. He graduated from the 40th class of the Imperial Japanese Naval Academy.

During World War II, Senda served as an officer stationed on the island of Biak, near New Guinea. Though he was the highest-ranking officer on the island, he was placed under the command of Kuzume Naoyuki, who was only a colonel. He commanded 1,500 troops of the 28th Marine Department, yet only 125 had engaged in combat training. He aided in the defense of Biak against the United States Army, but was killed in action after trying to fight off the US landings on December 25, 1944.
