= Shun'ichi =

- Gender: Male

Origin
- Origin: Japanese
- Meaning: Different meanings depending on the kanji used

Shun'ichi or Shunichi (written: 俊一 or 駿一) is a masculine Japanese given name. Notable people with the name include:

- Shunichi Amachi (天知 俊一; 1903–1976), Japanese baseball player and manager
- Shun'ichi Amari (甘利 俊一; born 1936), Japanese academic
- Shunichi Ikenoue (池ノ上 俊一; born 1967), Japanese footballer
- Shunichi Iwamura (岩村 俊一; born 1940), Japanese sprint canoeist
- Shun-ichi Iwasaki (岩崎 俊一; 1926–2025), Japanese engineer
- Shunichi Kajima (梶間 俊一; born 1944), Japanese film director
- Shun'ichi Kase (加瀬 俊一; 1897–1956), Japanese diplomat
- Shunichi Kawai (川合 俊一; born 1963), Japanese volleyball player, announcer and television personality
- Shunichi Kumai (熊井 俊一), Japanese footballer
- Shun'ichi Kuryu (born 1958), Japanese bureaucrat
- Shunichi Matsumoto (松本 俊一; 1897–1987), Japanese diplomat
- Shunichi Miyamoto (宮本 駿一; born 1986), Japanese musician and voice actor
- Shunichi Mizuoka (水岡 俊一; born 1956), Japanese politician
- Shunichi Nagasaki (長崎 俊一; born 1956), Japanese film director and screenwriter
- Shunichi Nemoto (根元 俊一; born 1983), Japanese baseball player
- Shunichi Shimizu (清水 俊一; born 1985), Japanese mixed martial artist
- Shun'ichi Suzuki (politician) (鈴木 俊一; born 1953), Japanese politician
- Shunichi Tanaka (田中 俊一; born 1987), Japanese footballer
- Shunichi Tokura (都倉 俊一; born 1948), Japanese composer
- Wakashoyo Shunichi (若翔洋 俊一; born 1966), Japanese mixed martial artist, kickboxer and sumo wrestler
- Shunichi Yamaguchi (山口 俊一; born 1950), Japanese politician
- Shunichi Yamashita (山下 俊一; born 1952), Japanese physician
- Shun'ichi Yukimuro (雪室 俊一; born 1941), Japanese screenwriter
