= Yoshihiro Senda =

Japanese archaeologist

- 千田 嘉博
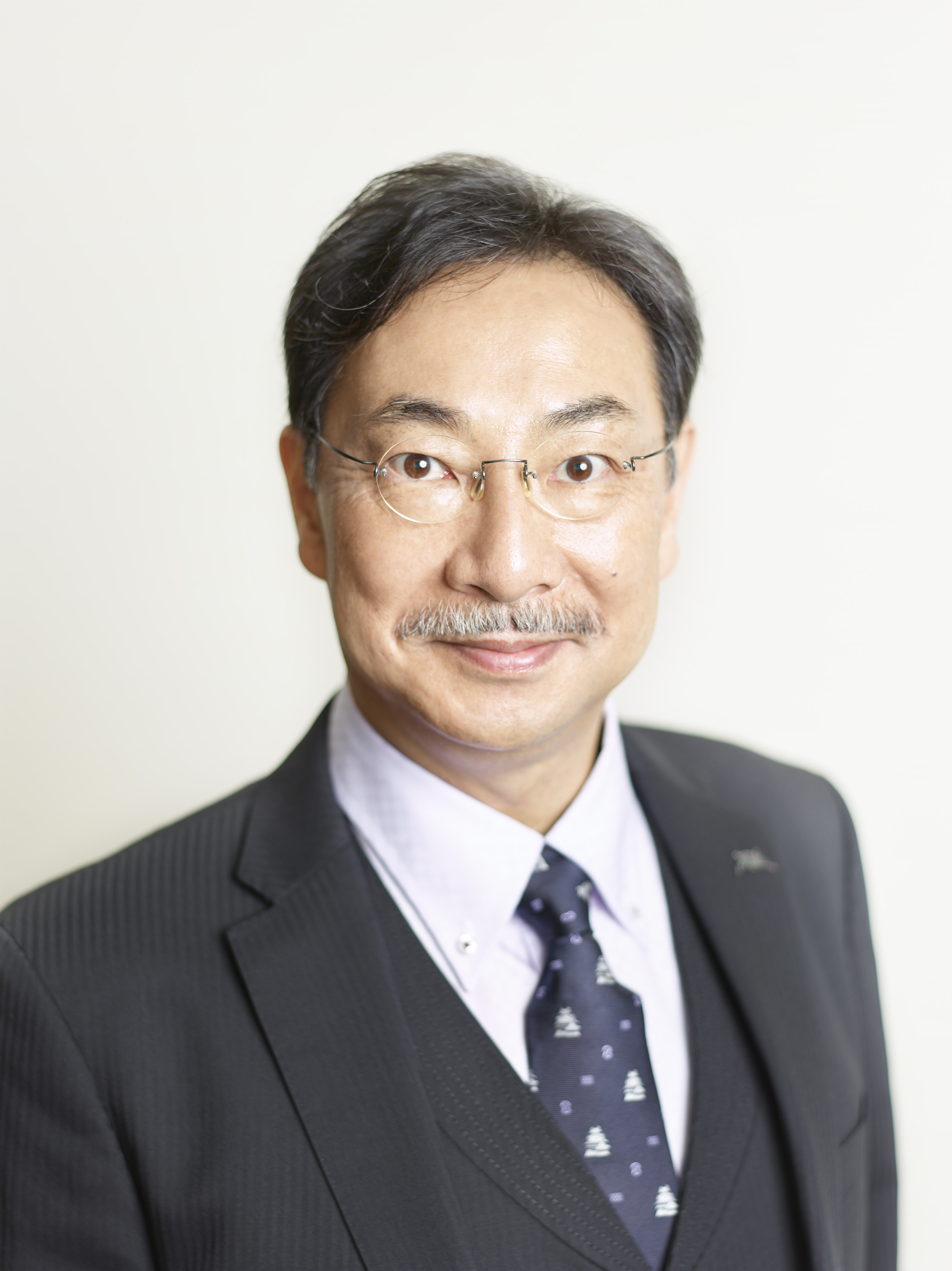
- Senda in 2019
- Born: July 19, 1963 (age 63); Aichi Prefecture, Japan
- Occupation: Castle archaeologist

Academic background
- Education: Nara University; Osaka University

Yoshihiro Senda (千田 嘉博, Senda Yoshihiro; born July 19, 1963) is a Japanese castle archeologist. He is a professor at Nara University and was president of the university from April 2014 to August 2016. His work focuses on the excavation and maintenance of castles from medieval and modern Japan, as well as comparative studies of castles around the world including those in Europe and Mongolia. He received the Hamada Seiryō Prize in 2015. He worked as a historical consultant for the taiga drama Sanada Maru in 2016. He has made several appearances on television. His books include Nobunaga's Castles, published by Iwanami Shoten.

== Biography ==
Yoshihiro Senda was born in Aichi Prefecture. He entered Nara University in 1982 and graduated in 1986. Afterwards, he became a curator at Nagoya City Miharashidai Archeological Museum. In 1990, he became an assistant at the National Museum of Japanese History. In 1995, he studied at the German Archeological Institute and the University of York in the United Kingdom as an overseas researcher for the Ministry of Education, Science and Culture. In 2000, he received a Doctor of Letters from Osaka University for his book The Construction of Shokuhō Castles. In 2001, he worked as assistant professor for the Archeology Division of the National Museum of Japanese History. In 2005, he became associate professor at Nara University and professor in 2009. He served as guest professor at the University of Tübingen and the Frankfurt University from August 2012 until August 2013. He acted as president of Nara University from 2014 until 2016. He was awarded the Hamada Seiryo Prize in 2015 by the city of Kishiwada and Asahi Shimbun for his contributions to and breakthroughs in the field of archeology of castles. In 2016, Senda worked on the researched-based historical reconstruction of the Sanada Maru for the NHK's taiga drama Sanada Maru. He appeared in the NHK's programs Historical Anecdotes and Shumi Doki! Oshiro he Ikou! The head of the NHK Osaka Broadcasting Center expressed gratitude to Senda for improving the programs' quality by providing castle knowledge and insights in an easy to understand manner. In 2018, the Nara Newspaper awarded him the Nara Newspaper Culture Award and the city of Uto, Kumamoto Prefecture honored him for his contributions to the city.

== Published work ==
- Construction of Shokuhō Castles (織豊系城郭の形成). University of Tokyo Press，2000.
- A Walk through Sengoku Period Castles (戦国の城を歩く). Chikuma Shobō, 2003.
- Nobunaga's Castles (信長の城). Iwanami New books, 2013.
- Mysteries of the Sanada Maru: Understanding the Sengoku Period through Castles (真田丸の謎 戦国時代を「城」で読み解く). NHK publication new books, 2015.
- Sanada Nobushige's Path to Victory (真田信繁「勝利」への条件). Mikasa Publishing, 2015.

=== Co-authored ===
- Castles and the Unification of Japan (天下統一と城), National Museum of Japanese History, Plan exhibition display pictorial record (compilation) Yomiuri Shimbun, 2000

== Public activities ==
- Contributed to the Asu he no Wadai column in Nihon Keizai Shimbun's evening paper from July to December 2016.
- Assisted in the excavation and maintenance of castles in various locales, helped protect cultural property, and helped compile histories of local governments. Has been a member of the committee responsible for selecting Japan's Top 100 Castles as well as the Continued Top 100 Japanese Castles.

== See also ==
- Castle
- Archaeology
