= Nara University =

Private university in Nara, Japan

Coordinates: 34°42′55″N 135°46′59″E

- 奈良大学
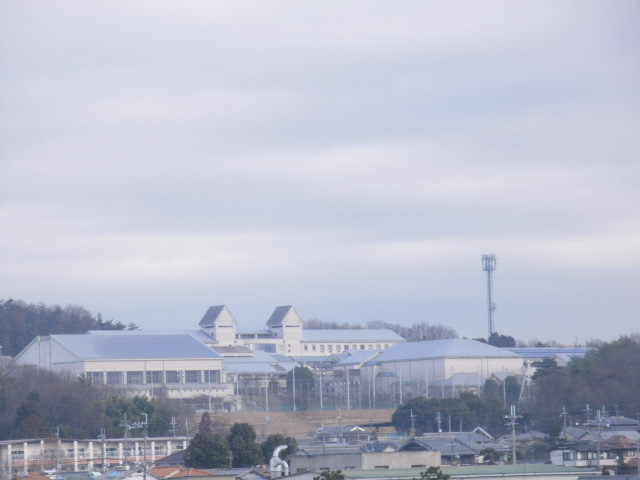
- Type: Private
- Established: 1969
- Location: Nara, Japan
- Campus: 1
- Language: Japanese
- Colours
- Website: http://www.nara-u.ac.jp

Nara University (奈良大学, Nara Daigaku) is a private university of approximately 3,700 students, in Misasagi-cho, Nara, Japan. It opened in 1969.

It is approximately a 20-minute walk from the Kintetsu train line's Takanohara Station.
