= Toshikazu Wakatsuki =

Doctor

- 若月俊一
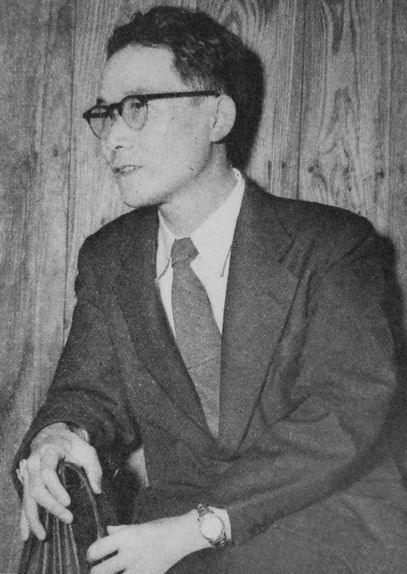
- Wakatsuki in 1953
- Born: June 26, 1910; Japan
- Died: August 22, 2006 (aged 96); Saku Central Hospital
- Spouse: Tsugie Takahashi
- Children: 2

Toshikazu Wakatsuki (若月俊一, Wakatsuki Toshikazu; June 26, 1910 – August, 2006) was a Japanese medical doctor. He received a M.D. from the University of Tokyo in 1936 and a PhD from the same institution in 1947, after imprisonment for anti-war views during World War II. In 1946, Wakatsuki performed Japan's first tubercular spinal caries and also organised its first blood bank. He founded the Japanese Association of Rural Medicine. Wakatsuki was awarded the 1976 Ramon Magsaysay Award for his contributions to rural medicine, as well as the Order of the Rising Sun with Gold and Silver Star in 1981. He died of pneumonia in August 2006, at the age of 96.
