= Sadasue Senda =

Imperial Japanese Army general

- 千田 貞季
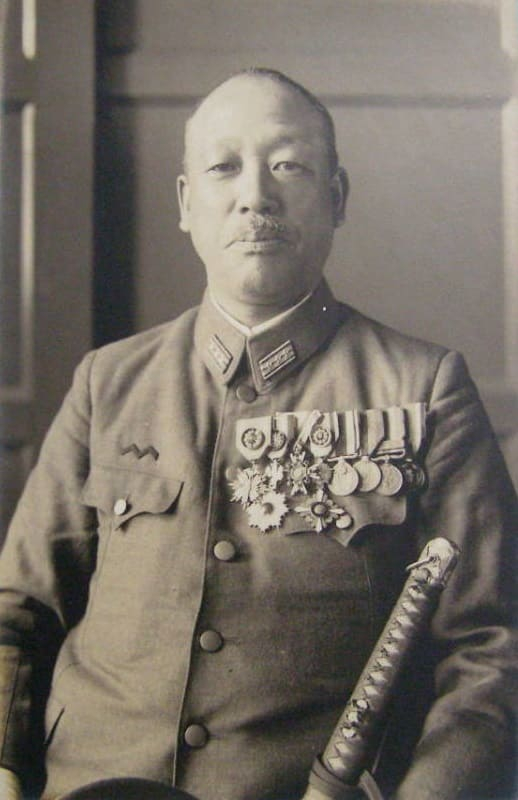
- Born: 16 December 1892; Kagoshima Prefecture, Japan
- Died: 8 March 1945 (aged 52); Iwo Jima, Japan
- Military career
- Allegiance: Empire of Japan
- Branch: Imperial Japanese Army
- Service years: 1914–1945
- Rank: Lieutenant General
- Unit: 2nd Independent Mixed Brigade
- Conflicts: World War II; Battle of Iwo Jima †

Senda Sadasue (千田 貞季, Sadasue Senda; 16 December 1892 – 8 March 1945) was a lieutenant general in the Imperial Japanese Army in World War II. He died in combat during the Battle of Iwo Jima.

== Biography ==
Senda was a native of Kagoshima Prefecture, and was born to the Takayama family, and was later adopted by the Senda family, whose surname he took. A graduate of the 26th class of the Imperial Japanese Army Academy in 1914, one of his classmates was General Tadamichi Kuribayashi. He was promoted to major in 1924. Assigned to the IJA 11th Division, he was in combat in the disastrous Battle of Lake Khasan against the Red Army in 1938. He was promoted to colonel in 1939, but was reassigned as chief of the discipline section in the Sendai Army Youth School.

On 29 May 1940, he became commanding officer of the 44th Infantry Regiment of the Japanese Imperial Army. He later became commandant of the Sendai Army Youth School on 5 February 1943, a post he maintained until 27 November 1944.

In Autumn 1944, general Tadamichi Kuribayashi, in charge of the defense of the island of Iwo Jima, replaced many local officers with others whom he judged more competent. Imperial General Headquarters promoted Senda to major general and sent assigned him to Iwo Jima, after general Kuribayashi requested "the best infantry leader" available. The choice was puzzling, as Senda had never attended the Army War College, a prerequisite for higher ranking officers, and his combat experience was very limited. Nevertheless, Senda took office at the 2nd Mixed Brigade as its commanding officer on 16 December 1944.

Senda built his headquarters in a cave in Mount Tamana, near Motoyama Airfield. He also organized his men in to "special assault squadrons" who were assigned suicide missions to rush enemy tanks with explosives. The 2nd Mixed Brigade bore the brunt of the attack by the IUSMC 4th Division for six days, from March 2 to March 8, in which it became completely encircled. As the US Marines resorted to flamethrowers to burn Senda's men in place, Kuribayashi refused Senda's repeated requests to be allowed to lead his men on a final Banzai charge attack. Instead, Kuribayashi ordered Senda to retreat with his remaining forces to the Japanese headquarters. Senda attempted a breakout with 427 men, but were pinned down on a beach and were annihilated, with only two men reaching Kuribayashi's lines. Some of Senda's men refused the order to surrender, and remained behind at Mount Tamana to continue guerrilla-style attacks on the American forces. Approximately half of the American forces killed in action during the battle died in Senda's sector. Senda was posthumously promoted to Lieutenant General and awarded the Order of the Golden Kite. 4th class.

== Decorations ==
- Order of the Rising Sun, 2nd class
- Order of the Golden Kite, 4th class
