= 82nd Cavalry =

82nd Cavalry may refer to:

- 82nd Cavalry Division, Soviet Union
- 82nd Cavalry Regiment, United States

== See also ==
- 82nd Division (disambiguation)
- 82nd Brigade (disambiguation)
- 82nd Regiment (disambiguation)
- 82nd (disambiguation)
