= LXXXII Corps =

LXXXII Corps or 82nd Corps may refer to:

- LXXXII Army Corps, Wehrmacht, Germany
- 82nd Rifle Corps, Soviet Union
- 82nd (Hindley) Lancashire Rifle Volunteer Corps, United Kingdom

== See also ==
- List of military corps by number
- 82nd Brigade (disambiguation)
- 82nd Division (disambiguation)
- 82nd Regiment (disambiguation)
- 82nd (disambiguation)
