= 82nd =

82nd is the ordinal form of the number 82. 82nd or Eighty-second may also refer to:

- A fraction, 1/82, equal to one of 82 equal parts

== Geography ==
- 82nd meridian east, a line of longitude
- 82nd meridian west, a line of longitude
- 82nd parallel north, a circle of latitude
- 82nd parallel south, a circle of latitude
- 82nd Avenue, Portland, Oregon
- 82nd Street (Manhattan)

== Military ==
- 82nd Group Army, People's Republic of China
- 82nd Brigade (disambiguation)
- 82nd Division (disambiguation)
- 82nd Regiment (disambiguation)
- 82nd Squadron (disambiguation)

== Other ==
- 82nd century
- 82nd century BC

== See also ==
- 82 (disambiguation)
