= 81st Mobile Brigade Combat Team =

Infantry brigade of the US Army National Guard

- 81st SBCT Shoulder Sleeve Insignia
- Founded: 18 July 1917–22 February 1919 (HHC 41st Div.); 3 January 1930–31 December 1945 (41st Infantry Div.); 26 February 1947–1 January 1968 (41st Infantry Div.); 1 January 1968–November 2003 (81st Infantry Bge.); November 2003–July 2015 (81st ABCT); July 2015–May 2025 (81st SBCT); May 2025–present (81st MBCT)
- Country: United States
- Allegiance: Washington Army National Guard
- Branch: United States Army National Guard
- Type: Motorized infantry
- Size: Brigade
- Part of: 36th Infantry Division
- Garrison/HQ: Camp Murray, Washington
- Nickname: "Cascade Rifles"
- Mottos: “Fight Outnumbered and Win”
- Colors: Red, white, black
- Mascot: Raven
- Equipment: M1301 ISV
- Engagements: World War I; World War II; New Guinea; Luzon; Southern Philippines (with arrowhead); Global War on Terrorism; Iraq; Operation Iraqi Freedom
- Website: https://mil.wa.gov/81st-brigade

Commanders
- Current commander: COL William Cooper

Insignia
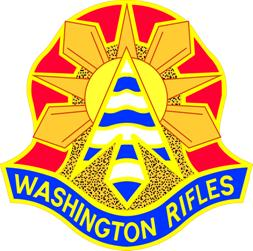
- Distinctive unit insignia

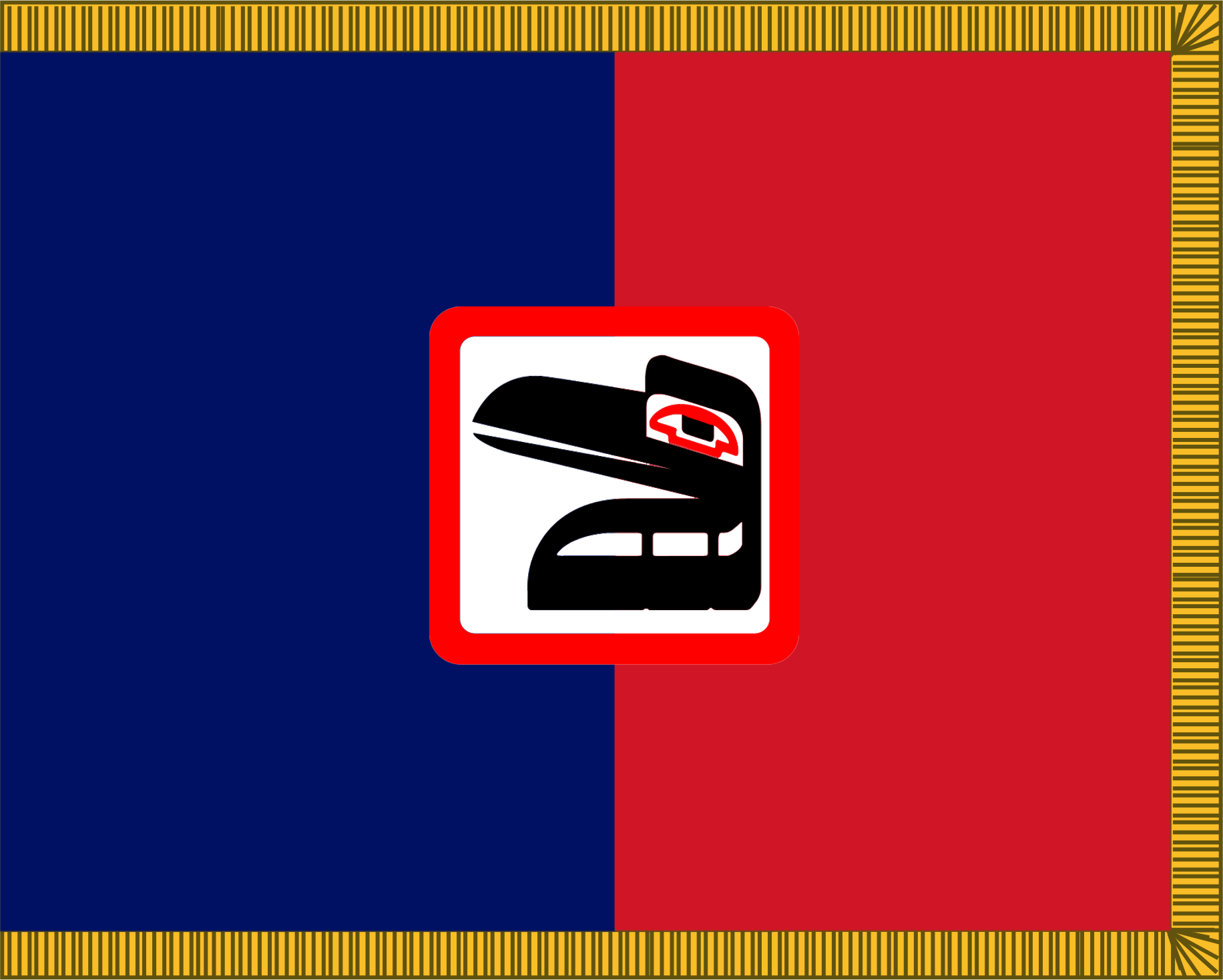
- 81st Stryker Brigade Combat Team Flag

The 81st Mobile Brigade Combat Team is a modular mechanized infantry brigade of the United States Army National Guard based in Washington, Oregon and California. On 9 July 2015 it was announced that the 81st Brigade would convert from being an Armored BCT to a Stryker BCT.

In September 2016 the 81st Brigade began the transition to a Stryker Brigade Combat Team. From 2016 to 2021, the 81st Brigade was part of the 7th Infantry Division and wore the ‘Indianhead’ patch under the Associated Unit Program (AUP). However, with the end of the AUP, the brigade donned its original "Raven" patch again in September 2021. As of 2022, the 81st SBCT has changed its alignment from the 7th Infantry Division to the 36th Infantry Division. In fall 2025, the Pentagon announced that the 81st Stryker Brigade Combat Team will convert to a Mobile Brigade Combat Team.

== Organization 2025 ==
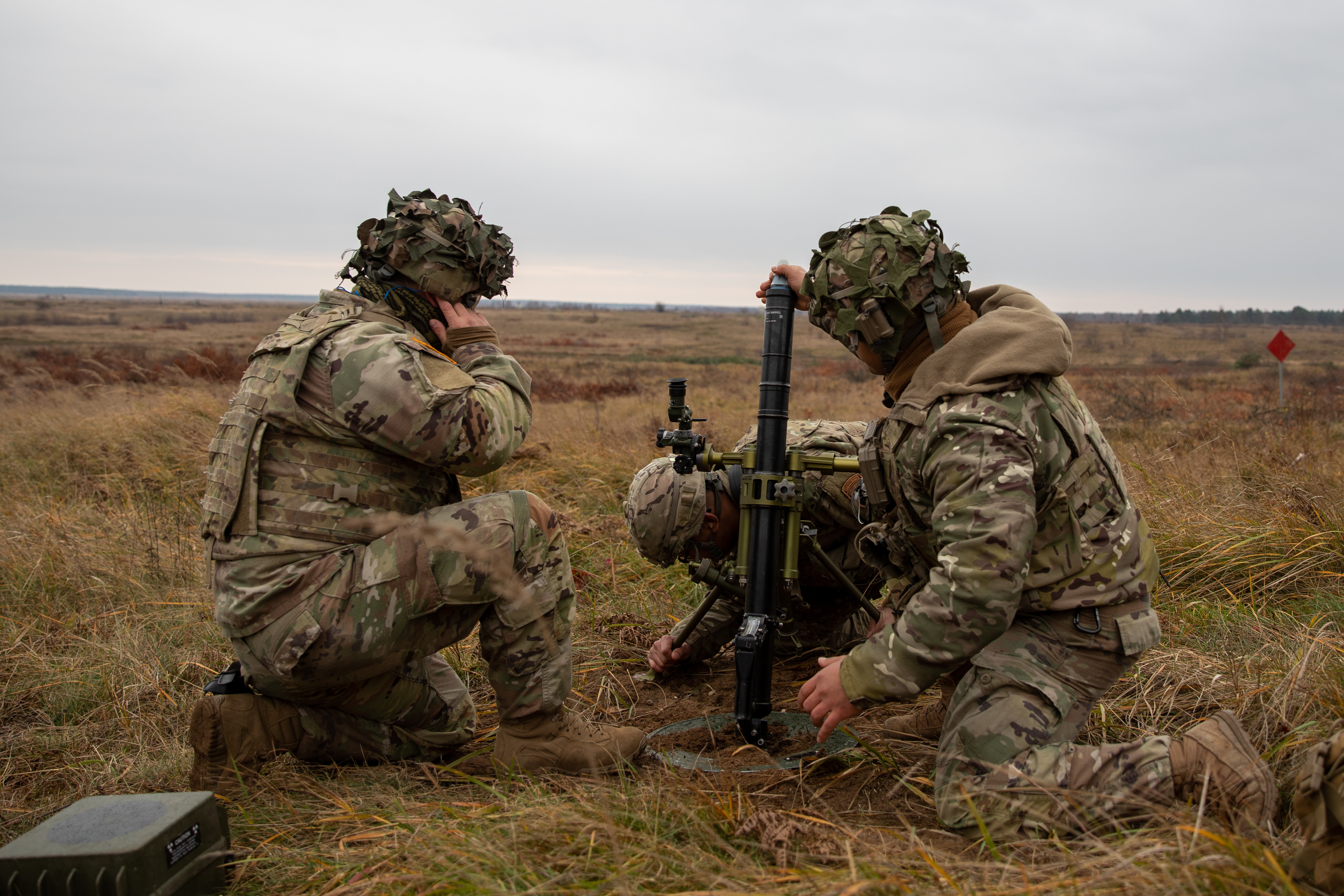
3rd Battalion, 161st Infantry Regiment, fire a M224 mortar during Rifle Forge, a live-fire exercise at Bemowo Piskie Training Area, Poland, Nov. 7, 2021.

The 81st Stryker Brigade contains seven battalions and a headquarters company. It assumed its current organizational structure as of 9 July 2015, when the 81st Brigade converted from a mechanized to a Stryker brigade and some units are attached to 2nd Infantry division which includes the 1-185th Infantry.

- 81st Stryker Brigade Combat Team, at Camp Murray
  - Headquarters and Headquarters Company, 81st Stryker Brigade Combat Team, at Camp Murray
  - 1st Squadron, 82nd Cavalry Regiment, in Bend (OR) (Oregon Army National Guard)
    - Headquarters and Headquarters Troop, 1st Squadron, 82nd Cavalry Regiment, in Bend
    - Troop A, 1st Squadron, 82nd Cavalry Regiment, in Albany
    - Troop B, 1st Squadron, 82nd Cavalry Regiment, in Redmond
    - Troop C, 1st Squadron, 82nd Cavalry Regiment, in Portland
    - Troop D (Weapons), 1st Squadron, 82nd Cavalry Regiment, in The Dalles
  - 1st Battalion, 161st Infantry Regiment, in Spokane
    - Headquarters and Headquarters Company, 1st Battalion, 161st Infantry Regiment, in Spokane
      - Detachment 1, Headquarters and Headquarters Company, 1st Battalion, 161st Infantry Regiment, in Richland
    - Company A, 1st Battalion, 161st Infantry Regiment, at Yakima Training Center
      - Detachment 1, Company A, 1st Battalion, 161st Infantry Regiment, in Wenatchee
    - Company B, 1st Battalion, 161st Infantry Regiment, in Richland
      - Detachment 1, Company B, 1st Battalion, 161st Infantry Regiment, in Walla Walla
    - Company C, 1st Battalion, 161st Infantry Regiment, in Spokane
      - Detachment 1, Company C, 1st Battalion, 161st Infantry Regiment, at Geiger Field
  - 3rd Battalion, 161st Infantry Regiment, in Kent
    - Headquarters and Headquarters Company, 3rd Battalion, 161st Infantry Regiment, in Kent
    - Company A, 3rd Battalion, 161st Infantry Regiment, in Anacortes
      - Detachment 1, Company A, 3rd Battalion, 161st Infantry Regiment, in Redmond
    - Company B, 3rd Battalion, 161st Infantry Regiment, in Kent
    - Company C, 3rd Battalion, 161st Infantry Regiment, in Bremerton
      - Detachment 1, Company C, 3rd Battalion, 161st Infantry Regiment, in Port Orchard
  - 1st Battalion, 185th Infantry Regiment, in San Bernardino (CA) (California Army National Guard — will be replaced by 1st Battalion, 204th Infantry Regiment (Utah Army National Guard) in 2026)
    - Headquarters and Headquarters Company, 1st Battalion, 185th Infantry Regiment, in San Bernardino
    - Company A, 1st Battalion, 185th Infantry Regiment, in Apple Valley
    - Company B, 1st Battalion, 185th Infantry Regiment, in Colton
    - Company C, 1st Battalion, 185th Infantry Regiment, in Palmdale
  - 2nd Battalion, 146th Field Artillery Regiment, in Olympia
    - Headquarters and Headquarters Battery, 2nd Battalion, 146th Field Artillery Regiment, in Olympia
      - Detachment 1, Headquarters and Headquarters Battery, 2nd Battalion, 146th Field Artillery Regiment, in Moses Lake
      - Detachment 2, Headquarters and Headquarters Battery, 2nd Battalion, 146th Field Artillery Regiment, in San Bernardino (CA) (California Army National Guard)
    - Battery A, 2nd Battalion, 146th Field Artillery Regiment, in Olympia
      - Detachment 1, Battery A, 2nd Battalion, 146th Field Artillery Regiment, in Moses Lake
    - Battery B, 2nd Battalion, 146th Field Artillery Regiment, in Olympia
    - Battery C, 2nd Battalion, 146th Field Artillery Regiment, in Olympia
  - 898th Brigade Engineer Battalion, in Marysville
    - Headquarters and Headquarters Company, 898th Brigade Engineer Battalion, in Marysville
    - Company A (Combat Engineer), 898th Brigade Engineer Battalion, at Yakima Training Center
    - Company B (Engineer Support), 898th Brigade Engineer Battalion, in Vancouver
    - Company C (Signal), 898th Brigade Engineer Battalion, in Marysville
    - Company D (Military Intelligence), 898th Brigade Engineer Battalion, at Camp Murray
      - Detachment 1, Company D (Military Intelligence), 898th Brigade Engineer Battalion, at Yakima Training Center (RQ-28A UAV)
  - 181st Brigade Support Battalion, in Seattle
    - Headquarters and Headquarters Company, 181st Brigade Support Battalion, in Seattle
    - Company A (Distribution), 181st Brigade Support Battalion, in Seattle
    - Company B (Maintenance), 181st Brigade Support Battalion, in Seattle
    - Company C (Medical), 181st Brigade Support Battalion, in Seattle
    - Company D (Forward Support), 181st Brigade Support Battalion, in Prineville (OR) — attached to 1st Squadron, 82nd Cavalry Regiment (Oregon Army National Guard)
    - Company E (Forward Support), 181st Brigade Support Battalion, in Marysville — attached to 898th Brigade Engineer Battalion
      - Detachment 1, Company E (Forward Support), 181st Brigade Support Battalion, at Yakima Training Center
      - Detachment 2, Company E (Forward Support), 181st Brigade Support Battalion, in Vancouver
    - Company F (Forward Support), 181st Brigade Support Battalion, in Olympia — attached to 2nd Battalion, 146th Field Artillery Regiment
    - Company G (Forward Support), 181st Brigade Support Battalion, in Ephrata — attached to 1st Battalion, 161st Infantry Regiment
      - Detachment 1, Company G (Forward Support), 181st Brigade Support Battalion, at Yakima Training Center
    - Company H (Forward Support), 181st Brigade Support Battalion, in Barstow (CA) — attached to 1st Battalion, 185th Infantry Regiment (California Army National Guard)
    - Company I (Forward Support), 181st Brigade Support Battalion, in Kent — attached to 3rd Battalion, 161st Infantry Regiment

The brigade normally conducts its annual training at the Yakima Training Center, near Yakima, Washington.

== Organization 2026 ==
- 81st Mobile Brigade Combat Team, at Camp Murray
  - Headquarters and Headquarters Company, 81st Mobile Brigade Combat Team, at Camp Murray
  - 1st Battalion, 161st Infantry Regiment, in Spokane
    - Headquarters and Headquarters Company, 1st Battalion, 161st Infantry Regiment, in Spokane
    - Company A, 1st Battalion, 161st Infantry Regiment, at Yakima Training Center
      - Detachment 1, Company A, 1st Battalion, 161st Infantry Regiment, in Wenatchee
    - Company B, 1st Battalion, 161st Infantry Regiment, in Richland
    - Company C, 1st Battalion, 161st Infantry Regiment, in Spokane
    - Company D (Multi-purpose Company), 1st Battalion, 161st Infantry Regiment, in Spokane
  - 3rd Battalion, 161st Infantry Regiment, in Kent
    - Headquarters and Headquarters Company, 3rd Battalion, 161st Infantry Regiment, in Kent
    - Company A, 3rd Battalion, 161st Infantry Regiment, in Anacortes
    - Company B, 3rd Battalion, 161st Infantry Regiment, in Kent
    - Company C, 3rd Battalion, 161st Infantry Regiment, in Bremerton
    - Company D (Multi-purpose Company), 3rd Battalion, 161st Infantry Regiment, in Marysville
  - 1st Battalion, 204th Infantry Regiment, in Ogden (UT) (Utah Army National Guard)
    - Headquarters and Headquarters Company, 1st Battalion, 204th Infantry Regiment, in Ogden (UT)
    - Company A, 1st Battalion, 204th Infantry Regiment, in Logan, in Ogden (UT)
    - Company B, 1st Battalion, 204th Infantry Regiment, in Tooele, in Ogden (UT)
    - Company C, 1st Battalion, 204th Infantry Regiment, in St. George, in Ogden (UT)
    - Company D (Multi-purpose Company), 1st Battalion, 204th Infantry Regiment, in Ogden (UT)
  - 81st Multi-Functional Reconnaissance Company, at Camp Murray
  - 898th Combat Engineer Company — Infantry, in Vancouver
  - 241st Signal Company, in Marysville
  - 281st Military Intelligence Company, at Camp Murray

=== Aligned units ===
36th Infantry Division units aligned with the 81st Mobile Brigade Combat Team:

- 36th Division Artillery
  - 2nd Battalion, 146th Field Artillery Regiment, in Olympia
    - Headquarters and Headquarters Battery, 2nd Battalion, 146th Field Artillery Regiment, in Olympia
    - Battery A, 2nd Battalion, 146th Field Artillery Regiment, in Olympia
    - Battery B, 2nd Battalion, 146th Field Artillery Regiment, in Olympia
    - Battery C, 2nd Battalion, 146th Field Artillery Regiment, in Olympia
    - Service Battery, 2nd Battalion, 146th Field Artillery Regiment, in Olympia
- 36th Division Sustainment Brigade
  - 181st Light Support Battalion, in Seattle
    - Headquarters and Distribution Company, 181st Light Support Battalion, in Seattle
    - Company A (Maintenance and Supply), 181st Light Support Battalion, in Seattle
    - Company B (Medical), 181st Light Support Battalion, in Seattle
    - Company C (Combat Logistic), 181st Light Support Battalion, at Yakima Training Center — aligned with the 1st Battalion, 161st Infantry Regiment
    - Company D (Combat Logistic), 181st Light Support Battalion, in Kent — aligned with the 3rd Battalion, 161st Infantry Regiment
    - Company E (Combat Logistic), 181st Light Support Battalion, in Ogden (UT) — aligned with the 1st Battalion, 204th Infantry Regiment (Utah Army National Guard)

== History ==
=== World Wars ===
The 81st Infantry Brigade was constituted as part of the 41st Infantry Division on 1 April 1917, consisting of the 161st and 162nd Infantry Regiments. The 41st deployed to France, but was designated a replacement division, with its infantry components sent to the 1st, 2nd, 32nd and 42nd Infantry Divisions.

Between the wars, the brigade joined the rest of the division in the Pacific Northwest, the headquarters moving with the home of the current brigade commander.

In January 1942, the 41st Infantry Division was reorganized from a two-brigade, four-regiment structure to a three-regiment structure with no brigade echelon. The 81st ceased to exist and its two component regiments split up. The 161st went to the 25th Infantry Division while the 162nd remained in the 41st Infantry Division, where they both saw extensive combat.

=== Cold War ===
As part of an Army reorganization, the 81st was revived as a separate light infantry brigade on 1 January 1968 under Brigadier General Albert Kaye and built around the three battalions of the 161st Infantry Regiment. In 1971, the brigade converted to mechanized infantry, substituting one infantry battalion with 1st Battalion, 303rd Armor.

In subsequent years, the brigade was consecutively "affiliated" with the 9th Infantry Division and 4th Infantry Division before finally becoming the "roundout brigade" for the 9th Division and wearing its patch instead of the separate brigade patch. In 1991, the 9th Division was deactivated and the 81st was a separate brigade once again, tasked to augment the 2nd Infantry Division in the Republic of Korea in wartime.

Like many National Guard units, the 81st Brigade has been activated for state duty several times to respond to disasters and disorder. It responded to floods in December 1975 and November 1990, the 1980 eruption of Mount St. Helens, forest fires in 1994 and many other years, and the WTO Riots of 1999.

=== Iraq (2004) ===
The 3,600-member 81st, one of the United States Army's 15 National Guard "enhanced readiness" or E-brigades, was federalized in November 2003 to support Operation Iraqi Freedom under Brigadier General Oscar Hilman. Most of its troops conducted pre-mobilization training at Fort Lewis, WA and the National Training Center and served in theater from March 2004 to March 2005. The brigade was broken up, and its components extensively reorganized under the 13th Corps Support Command (COSCOM) to meet the mission requirements:

Unit	Organizational notes	Area of Operation
81st Bde (-)	HQ, 81st Armor Brigade; 181st Support Battalion	LSA Anaconda
1st Battalion, 161st Infantry; 1st Battalion, 303d Armor	Attached to 1st Cavalry Division	Central and Southeast Baghdad
"Task Force Tacoma"	Company A, 1st Battalion, 185th Armor (after fall 2004); Company B, 1st Battalion, 185th Armor; Company B, 160th Infantry (CA Army National Guard); Company A, 579th Engineer Battalion (CA Army National Guard), Headquarters Company, 898th Engineer Battalion (WA Army National Guard); and other elements. Attached to 1st Infantry Division. On Dec 6th, 2017, Task Force Tacoma was awarded the Valorous Unit Award for their support in operation founding fathers. The unit displayed extraordinary heroism in action against an armed enemy and help set the conditions for the first free democratic elections in the Ninevah Province, Iraq.	Area surrounding LSA Anaconda (2004)
1st Battalion, 185th Armor(-)	Minus Company B, 1st Battalion, 185th Armor, and Company A, 1st Battalion, 185th Armor after fall 2004	Various sites in Southern Iraq
2nd Battalion, 146th Field Artillery; Troop E, 303d Cavalry		Various sites in Kuwait, Battery B, 2d Battalion, 146th Field Artillery in Saudi Arabia

A total of ten brigade soldiers died from enemy action over the course of the deployment, the majority of those from the 1st Battalion, 161st Infantry, the unit most directly involved in day-to-day combat operations. The 1st Battalion, 161st Infantry was responsible for the security and combat operations of a densely populated area of southeast Baghdad known as Al Zafranaya and Jsr Diayla. The battalion operated primarily out of Forward Operating Base Gunner (later renamed to FOB Highlander in honor of the battalion's nickname), Baghdad, Iraq. For its performance in combat, the 1–161st Infantry was awarded the Meritorious Unit Citation by the Department of the Army.

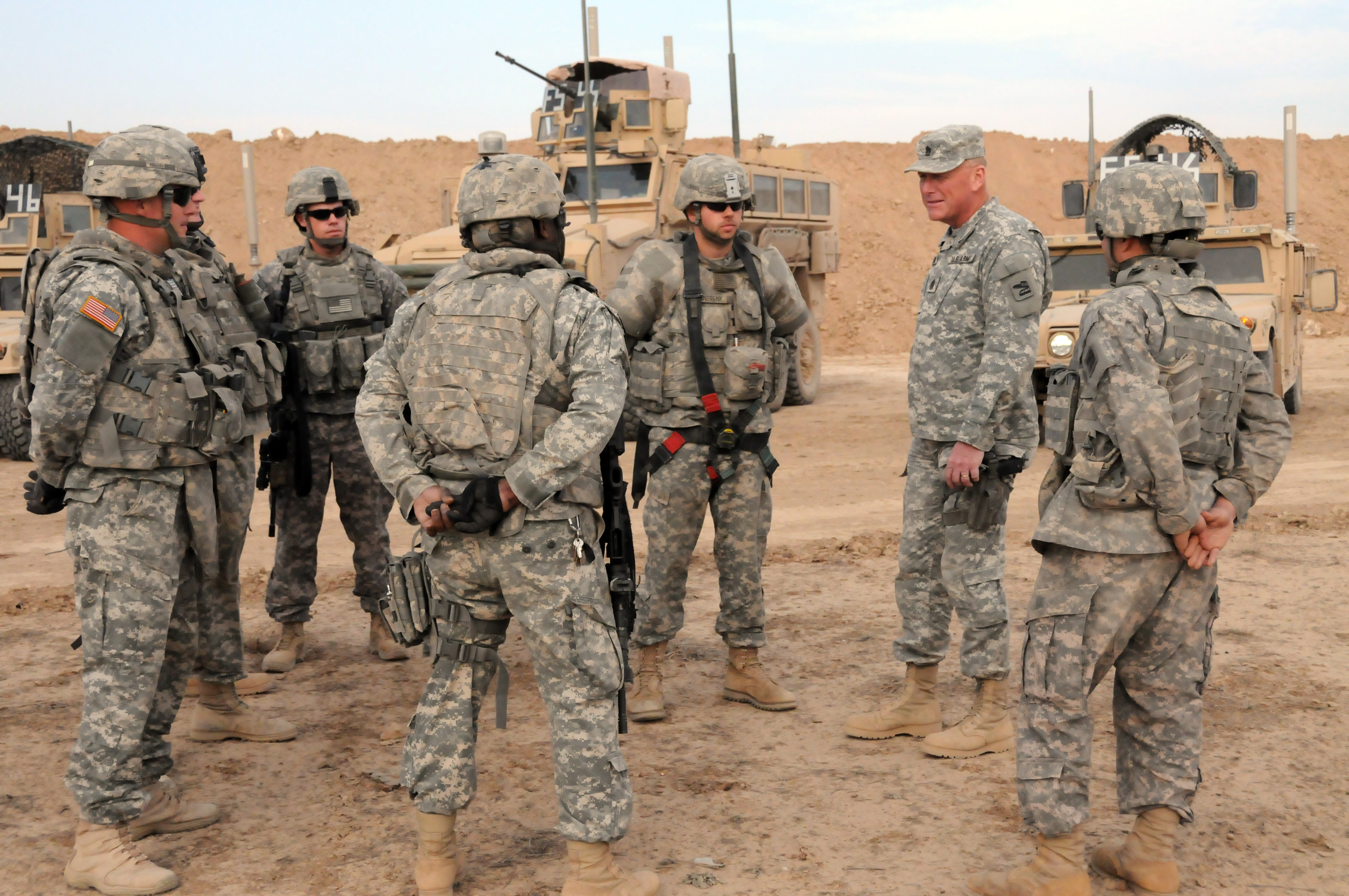
81st Brigade Combat Team Command Sergeant Major meets with his soldiers in Iraq.

Upon its return from overseas in March 2005, the brigade began to reorganize in accordance with the Army's new "Unit of Action" Brigade design, adopting the organization it has today.

Between deployments, the brigade responded to floods in Southwest Washington caused by the Great Coastal Gale of 2007.

=== Iraq (2008) ===
The 81st Brigade was alerted for a deployment in support of Operation Iraqi Freedom. It received its mobilization order on 19 March 2008 from the Department of Defense. The brigade completed pre-deployment training at Fort McCoy, WI and then deployed to Iraq from August 2008 to August 2009. The main focus of the brigade in OIF was security and "force protection operations."

The brigade was led into Iraq by Colonel Ronald Kapral and State Command Sergeant Major Robert Sweeney. During their time in Iraq, the brigade was visited by Washington state Governor Christine Gregoire and Washington Adjutant General, Brigadier General Toney. It suffered one fatality during its deployment, Specialist Samuel D. Stone, in a vehicle accident while on patrol.

Troop A, 1st Squadron, 303rd Cavalry Regiment received the Distinguished Service Unit award. The award was received on behalf of the unit by Captain Patrick Gehring and First Sergeant Travis Wise.

The brigade has shifted mobilization affiliation several times since the 1990s. It had been associated with the 2nd Infantry Division in South Korea. With the shift to being an armored brigade in 2005, it was affiliated for mobilization purposes to the 40th Infantry Division. From 2015 to 2021, the 81st SBCT was affiliated with the JBLM-based 7th Infantry Division.

== Notable members ==
- Laverne Parrish - Technician-4, a medic with 1st Battalion, 161st Infantry Regiment received the Medal of Honor for his valorous actions in the Philippine Campaign of WWII
- James Dalton II - Brigadier General, Commander of the 161st Infantry Regiment and later Deputy Commander of the 25th Infantry Division during the Pacific Campaigns of WWII. He was killed in action during Battle of Balete Pass on 16 May 1945. Posthumously awarded the Distinguished Service Cross, Silver Star and Purple Heart. One of 11 US General Officers Killed in Action during the Second World War.
- Matthew Shea - Captain, 1st Battalion, 161st Infantry Regiment. Elected to the Washington House of Representatives from the 4th Legislative District 12 January 2009 to 11 January 2021. Deployed to both Bosnia (1999) and Iraq (2004) where he served as the Commander of HHC, 1-161 Infantry.
- Ryan G. Anderson - Specialist who attempted to provide relief to al-Qaeda
