= J82 =

J82 may refer to:

== Places ==
- Ground Equipment Facility J-82, Keno Air Force Station, Keno, Oregon, USA; a U.S. Air Force facility
- Leyland Observatory (observatory code J82), Leyland, UK; see List of observatory codes

== Other uses ==
- HMS Hussar (J82), a British Royal Navy WW2 Halcyon-class minesweeper
- Gyrate bidiminished rhombicosidodecahedron (Johnson solid J_{82})

== See also ==
- Shenyang J-8 II "Finback", a Chinese jet fighter plane, a variant of the MiG-21
- 82 (disambiguation)
- J (disambiguation)
