= M82 =

M82, M 82 or M-82 most often refers to:

- Barrett M82, a .50 caliber rifle
- Messier 82, a galaxy

M82, M 82 or M-82 may also refer to:

== Astronomy ==
- M82 X-1, a candidate black hole in Messier 82

== Aviation ==
- Shvetsov ASh-82, an aircraft engine produced in the Soviet Union

== Military ==
- Arsenal M82, an 82 mm mortar
- Parker-Hale M82, 7.62-caliber rifle
- Valmet M82, an assault rifle
- HMAS Huon (M 82), a Royal Australian Navy minehunter

== Transportation ==
- M-82 (Michigan highway), a state highway in Michigan
- Madison County Executive Airport, an airport near Huntsville, Alabama (former FAA LID code: M82)

== Music ==
- Piano Concerto for the Left Hand (Ravel), M82 in the Marnat catalogue

== See also ==
- 82 (disambiguation)
