= 146th Field Artillery Regiment =

US military unit

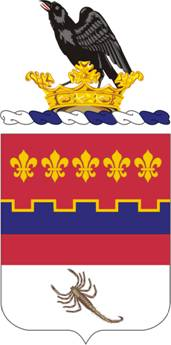
- Coat of arms
- Active: 1886
- Country: United States
- Branch: Washington Army National Guard
- Type: Field artillery
- Motto: Action Front

Insignia
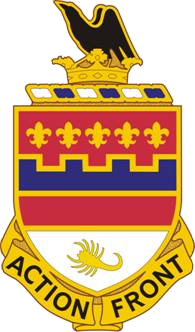
- Distinctive Unit Insignia

The 146th Field Artillery Regiment is a field artillery regiment of the Army National Guard first Constituted in 1886 as the 1st, and 2nd Regiments of Infantry.

== Lineage ==
Organized 9 March 1886 and 7 April 1887 from existing companies in the Washington Territorial Militia as the 1st (west of the Cascade Mountains) and 2d (east of the Cascade Mountains) Regiments of Infantry

(Washington Territorial Militia redesignated 28 January 1888 as the Washington National Guard)

2d Infantry Regiment reorganized and redesignated 23 July 1895 as the 1st Infantry Battalion

1st Infantry Regiment reorganized and redesignated in 1897 as the 2d Infantry Battalion

Ten companies of the 1st and 2d Infantry Battalions mustered into federal service 6–13 May 1898 at Tacoma as elements of the 1st Regiment, Washington Volunteer Infantry and mustered out of federal service 1 November 1899 at San Francisco, California; two companies of the 1st and 2d Infantry Battalions mustered into federal service 2–15 July 1898 at Tacoma as elements of the Independent Battalion, Washington Volunteer Infantry, and mustered out of federal service 28 October 1898 at Vancouver Barracks, Washington

Elements of the former 1st and 2d Infantry Battalions consolidated 9 November 1899 with the 1st and 2d Infantry Regiments (organized in 1898 in the Washington National Guard) and consolidated unit reorganized and designated as the 1st Infantry Regiment

Redesignated 15 May 1903 as the 2d Infantry Regiment

Mustered into federal service 28 June 1916 at Camp Elmer M. Brown, Washington; mustered out of federal service 8 October 1916 at American Lake

Drafted into federal service 5 August 1917

Consolidated 19 September – 20 October 1917 with elements of the 3rd Infantry Regiment (District of Columbia National Guard) to form the 161st Infantry, and assigned to the 41st Infantry Division (United States)

Demobilized 1–8 March 1919 at Camp Dix, New Jersey, and Camp Dodge, Iowa

Former 2d Infantry Regiment reorganized 1 January 1921 in the Washington National Guard as the 161st Infantry Regiment (United States), with headquarters at Spokane, and assigned to the 41st Division

1st Battalion and Headquarters and Supply Company, 161st Infantry, consolidated 10 May 1921 with the former Washington National Guard field artillery battalion (see ANNEX) to form the 146th Field Artillery, with headquarters at Seattle, and assigned to the 41st Division (remainder of 161st Infantry – hereafter separate lineage)

146th Field Artillery inducted into federal service 16 September 1940 at home stations

Regiment broken up 17 February 1942 and its elements reorganized and redesignated as follows:

Headquarters disbanded

1st and 2d Battalions as the 146th and 167th Field Artillery Battalions, elements of the 41st Infantry Division

(Headquarters Battery as Headquarters and Service Company, 133d Engineers; Band as the Band, 41st Division Artillery – hereafter separate lineages)

After 17 February 1942 the above units underwent changes as follows:

Headquarters, 146th Field Artillery, reconstituted 25 August 1945 in the Washington National Guard Reorganized and federally recognized 9 March 1948 at Seattle as Headquarters, 66th Field Artillery Group Ordered into active federal service 11 September 1950 at Seattle; released from active federal service 10 July 1952 and reverted to state control; federal recognition withdrawn 1 August 1952

146th Field Artillery Battalion inactivated 31 December 1945 in Japan Reorganized and federally recognized 13 May 1947 with headquarters at Seattle

167th Field Artillery Battalion inactivated 31 December 1945 in Japan Reorganized and federally recognized 9 July 1947 at Vancouver

Headquarters, 66th Field Artillery Group, and the 146th and 167th Field Artillery Battalions consolidated, reorganized, and redesignated 15 April 1959 as the 146th Artillery, a parent regiment under the Combat Arms Regimental System, to consist of the 1st Howitzer Battalion and 2d Rocket Howitzer Battalion, elements of the 41st Infantry Division

Reorganized 1 March 1963 to consist of the 1st and 2d Battalions

Reorganized 1 January 1968 to consist of the 2d Battalion, an element of the 81st Infantry Brigade

Withdrawn 1 June 1989 from the Combat Arms Regimental System and reorganized under the United States Army Regimental System with headquarters at Olympia

Redesignated 16 October 2005 as the 146th Field Artillery Regiment

Ordered into active federal service 15 November 2003 at home stations; released from active federal service 12 May 2005 and reverted to state control (81st Infantry Brigade reorganized 1 September 2005 as the 81st Armored Brigade Combat Team)

Transitioned from self-propelled howitzer battalion (Paladins) to a towed howitzer battalion (m777)

=== Annex ===
Constituted in 1914 in the Washington National Guard as a field artillery battalion Assigned 18 July 1917 to the 41st Division

Battery A organized and drafted into federal service 5 August 1917; remainder of battalion organized 25 September 1917 while in federal service at Camp Greene, North Carolina, from personnel recruited for the Washington National Guard field artillery

Consolidated 19 September 1917 with Headquarters Company, Supply Company, and 1st Battalion, 2d Infantry (Idaho National Guard), and Battery A, Field Artillery (New Mexico National Guard), to form the 146th Field Artillery and assigned to the 41st Division

Demobilized 26 June 1919 at Fort D.A. Russell, Wyoming

== Distinctive unit insignia ==
- Description

A gold color metal and enamel device 1 1/8 inches (2.9 cm) in height consisting of the shield, crest and motto of the coat of arms.

- Symbolism

The divisions of the shield are three, indicating the service as follows: Chief – five fleurs-de-lis on a red field to indicate service as Field Artillery in France and participating in five battles. Base – scorpion on white field, to indicate service as Infantry on the Mexican Border. Fess – the colors of the Philippine flag, red and blue, embattled to indicate actual participation in combat. The crest is that of George Washington. The State of Washington is a part of the Oregon Territory whose American title was established in 1846.

- Background

The distinctive unit insignia was originally approved for the 146th Field Artillery Regiment, Washington National Guard on 9 October 1926. It was amended to revise the blazon of the shield on 16 February 1927. It was redesignated for the 146th Field Artillery Battalion, Washington National Guard on 25 August 1942. The insignia was redesignated for the 146th Artillery Regiment, Washington National Guard on 5 April 1961. It was redesignated for the 146th Field Artillery Regiment, Washington Army National Guard on 14 July 1972.

== Coat of arms ==
=== Blazon ===
- Shield

Parti per fess Gules and Argent, a fess similarly divided embattled Azure and of the first fimbriated to chief Or, in chief five fleurs-de-lis of the last, in base a scorpion bendways Proper.

- Crest

That for the regiments and separate battalions of the Washington Army National Guard: On a wreath of the colors Argent and Azure, a raven with wings endorsed issuing out of a ducal coronet all Proper. Motto ACTION FRONT.

=== Symbolism ===
- Shield

The divisions of the shield are three, indicating the service as follows: Chief – five fleurs-de-lis on a red field to indicate service as Field Artillery in France and participating in five battles. Base – scorpion on white field, to indicate service as Infantry on the Mexican Border. Fess – the colors of the Philippine flag, red and blue, embattled to indicate actual participation in combat.

- Crest

The crest is that of the Washington Army National Guard.

=== Background ===
The coat of arms was originally approved for the 146th Field Artillery Regiment, Washington National Guard on 25 May 1925. It was amended to revise the blazon and description of the shield on 16 February 1927. It was redesignated for the 146th Field Artillery Battalion, Washington National Guard on 10 August 1942. The insignia was redesignated for the 146th Artillery Regiment, Washington National Guard on 5 April 1961. It was redesignated for the 146th Field Artillery Regiment, Washington Army National Guard on 14 July 1972.

== Campaign participation credit ==
- Philippine Insurrection
  - Manila
  - Luzon 1899
- World War I
  - Champagne-Marne
  - Aisne-Marne
  - St. Mihiel
  - Meuse-Argonne
  - Champagne 1918
- World War II
  - New Guinea (with arrowhead)
  - Luzon (with arrowhead)
  - Southern Philippines
- War on Terrorism

== Decorations ==
- Army Superior Unit Award, Streamer embroidered 1995
- Philippine Presidential Unit Citation, Streamer embroidered 17 OCTOBER 1944 TO 4 JULY 1945

== See also ==
- U.S. Army Regimental System
