= 161st Infantry Regiment (United States) =

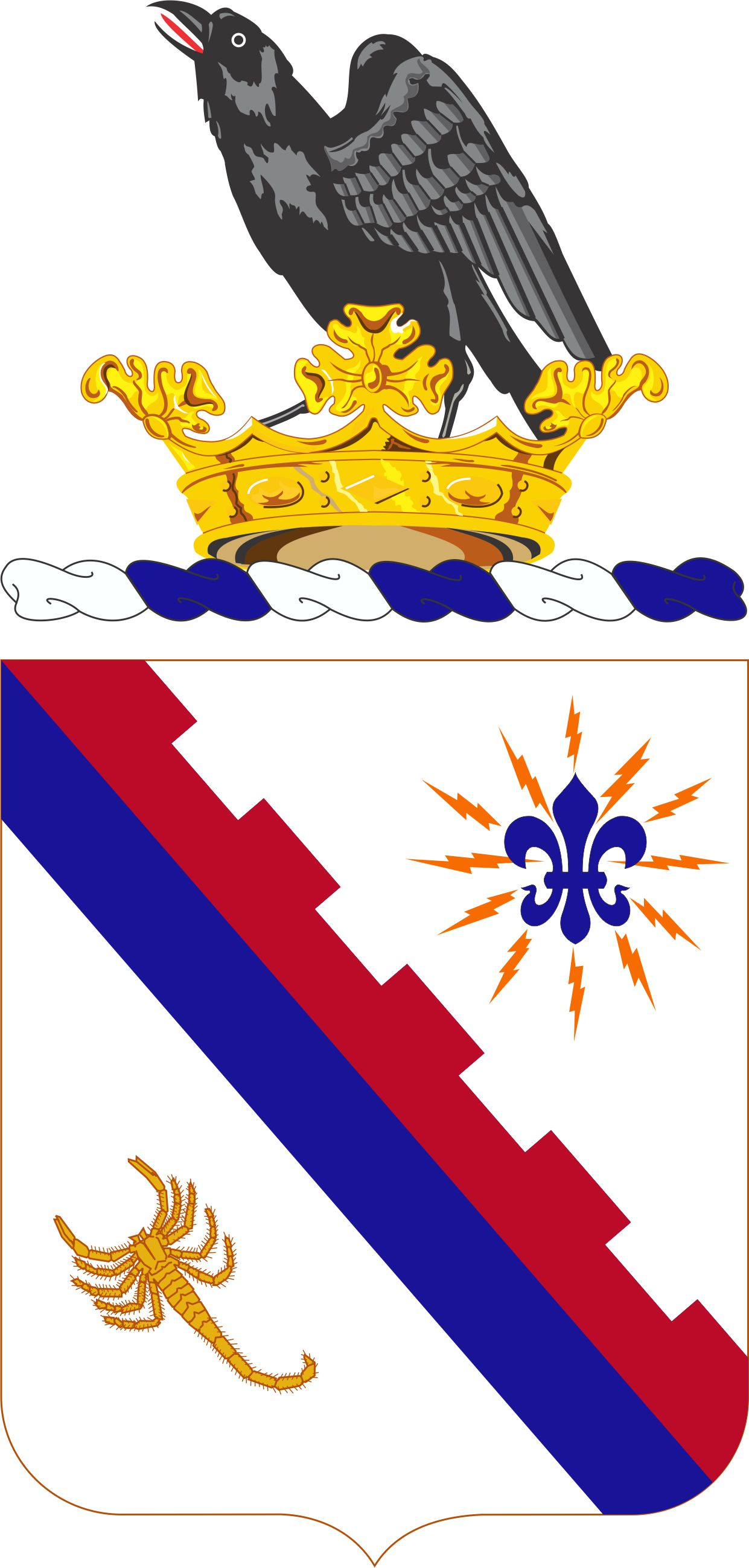
- Coat of arms
- Active: 1886–present
- Country: United States
- Allegiance: Washington
- Branch: Washington Army National Guard
- Type: Stryker Infantry
- Size: Regiment
- Part of: 81st Stryker Brigade Combat Team
- Garrison: Spokane, Richland, Yakima, Wenatchee, Bremerton, Kent, Redmond, Washington
- Nickname: "First Washington" 1st Battalion: "Highlanders" 3rd Battalion: "Dark Rifles"
- Mottos: First In War, First In Peace
- Mascots: 1st BN “Highlanders,” 3rd BN “Dark Rifles”

Commanders
- Current commander: 1st Battalion: LTC George Knapp; 3rd Battalion: LTC Joshua Brown
- Notable commanders: James Dalton II

Insignia
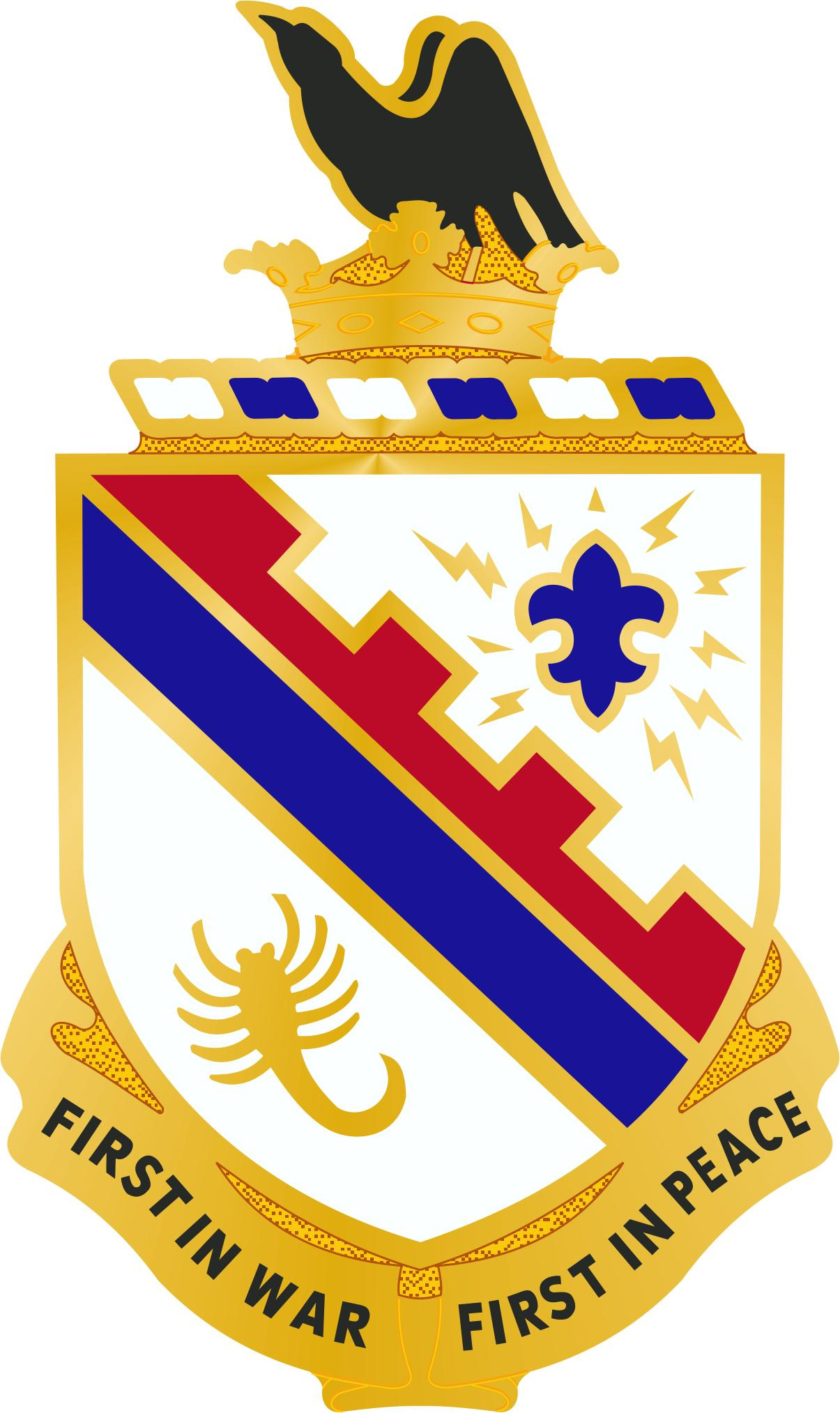
- Distinctive unit insignia

The 161st Infantry Regiment is an infantry regiment of the United States Army and the Washington Army National Guard. It is the oldest unit in the Washington Army National Guard, tracing its lineage to the separate infantry companies of the Territorial Militia. Its 1st Battalion is a Stryker-based element of the 81st Stryker Brigade Combat Team consisting of three Stryker infantry companies and one headquarters company, with its headquarters in Spokane, Washington.

== Origin ==
The 161st Infantry was first organized on 9 March 1886 as the 1st Infantry Regiment and the 2nd Infantry Regiment (on 7 April 1887) from existing independent militia companies which traced their origins back to 1855 when the federal government granted permission to the Washington Territory to raise a voluntary militia to defend settlers against attacks by the Yakima Indians.

== Philippine Insurrection, 1898–1902 ==
During the War with Spain the United States seized the Philippine Islands in 1898. Elements of the Filipino army, who wanted independence and resented the seizure of their islands by the United States, began hostilities against U.S. Army units stationed in the Philippines. To reinforce these units, the War Department mustered National Guard units into federal service. Among them were ten companies of the 1st and 2nd Infantry Battalions of the Washington National Guard, mustered into federal service 6–13 May 1898 at Tacoma. The Washington National Guardsmen were then reorganized and redesignated as the 1st Regiment, Washington Volunteer Infantry.

The regiment was dispatched to the Philippines where it was assigned to the 2nd Brigade, 1st Division, VIII Corps. In what is known officially as the Philippine Insurrection and also known as the Philippine–American War, the 1st Washington participated in the Manila campaign as well as seeing additional action against the Filipino insurgents on the island of Luzon in 1899. The regiment was cited for valorous conduct at the Battle of Santa Ana. The First Washington spent a week in Japan en route back to America. It was mustered out of federal service on 1 November 1899 at San Francisco, CA.

== Mexican Punitive Expedition ==
Also known as Pancho Villa Expedition In 1916, the War Department once again mustered National Guard units into federal service to reinforce Regular Army units protecting the southern border of the United States from raids by the Mexican rebel Pancho Villa. The First Washington—now designated the 2nd Infantry Regiment, Washington National Guard—was mustered into federal service on 28 June 1916 at Camp Elmer M. Brown, WA and was dispatched to Calexico, CA for duty. Three months later the regiment returned to American Lake, WA where it was mustered out on 8 October 1916.

Camp of the 2nd Washington Federal Infantry on the Mexican border at Calexico, California in about 1916

== World War I ==
As war clouds gathered, the 2nd Infantry Regiment, Washington National Guard was called back into federal service on 25 March 1917. In July 1917 the War Department set up a new numbering system for infantry regiments with National Guard regiments to be numbered 101–300. One hundred and sixty seven National Guard regiments were renumbered. From 19 September to 20 October 1917, the 2nd Infantry Regiment was consolidated with elements of the 3rd Infantry Regiment, District of Columbia National Guard to form the 161st Infantry Regiment. The 161st was assigned to the 41st Division on 19 September 1917. Sent overseas to France, the 161st was not committed to combat. Rather, the personnel of the 161st were used as replacements for other units. For its service the regiment was awarded the World War I campaign streamer without inscription.

== Interwar period ==
The 161st Infantry arrived at the port of Newport News in February 1919 on the troopship USS Georgia and was demobilized from 1–8 May 1919 at Camp Dix, New Jersey, and Camp Dodge, Iowa. Per the National Defense Act of 1920, the 161st Infantry was reconstituted in the National Guard in 1921, assigned to the 41st Division, and allotted to the state of Washington. It was reorganized on 1 May 1921 by consolidation with the 2nd Infantry, Washington National Guard (organized in 1918; headquarters organized 30 September 1918 and federally recognized at Spokane, Washington) and redesignation as the 161st Infantry The regiment, or elements thereof, was called up to perform the following state duties: 2nd Battalion performed duties in connection with guarding prisoners at a penitentiary in Walla Walla, 3–8 September 1926; 2nd Battalion performed strike duties in connection with an agri-labor/I.W.W. strike at Yakima, 24–27 August 1933; entire regiment for riot control duties in connection with a timber workers strike in Grays Harbor County and Tacoma, 12 July–9 August 1935. The regiment conducted annual summer training at Camp Murray, Washington, adjacent to Fort Lewis, from 1921–39.

== World War II ==
When the 41st Infantry Division was ordered into federal service on 16 September 1940, it was still configured as a square division with two brigades each of two infantry regiments, of which one was the 161st Infantry. Initially ordered to Camp Murray on 20 September 1940, the division was transferred to Fort Lewis, Washington on 20 March 1941. Between 5 June and 2 July 1941 the 41st participated in the IX Corps maneuvers at Hunter Liggett Military Reservation, California. Returning to Washington, the division next participated in the Fourth Army maneuvers at Fort Lewis from 15 through 30 August 1941.

With the 41st Division being reconfigured to the new triangular division configuration with three infantry regiments, the 161st was considered excess. The War Department ordered the 161st Infantry to the Philippines to reinforce American forces there in anticipation of a possible Japanese invasion; the Japanese attacked Hawaii and the Philippines before the 161st was to depart San Francisco. In reaction, the War Department directed the 161st to Hawaii to reinforce the defenses there. The regiment sailed from San Francisco on 16 December 1941, arriving in Hawaii on 21 December. On 17 February 1942, the 161st Infantry was reassigned from the 41st Division to the Hawaiian Department. On 23 July 1942, with the inactivation of the 24th Infantry Division's 299th Infantry Regiment, whose ranks had been depleted through the transfer of many Nisei (second-generation Japanese-Americans) in order to form the 100th Infantry Battalion, the War Department reassigned the 25th Infantry Division's 298th Infantry Regiment to the 24th Infantry Division, and replaced it on 3 August 1942 with the 161st Infantry.

The 161st, along with the rest of the 25th Infantry Division, was alerted for shipment to Guadalcanal to reinforce the American forces already there and to provide sufficient combat strength to allow the US XIV Corps to launch offensive operations to destroy the Japanese forces on the island. The 25th was reconfigured into three regimental combat teams (RCT). The 161st RCT was composed of the 161st Infantry, the 89th Field Artillery Battalion and other combat support units under the command of Colonel Clarence A. Orndorff. The 25th departed Hawaii at the end of November 1942.

=== Guadalcanal ===
The 35th RCT arrived at Guadalcanal on 17 December 1942, followed by the 27th RCT on 1 January 1943, with the 161st RCT arriving on 4 January 1943. The 25th Division was assigned to the XIV Corps composed of the 25th, the Americal Division and the 2nd Marine Division. Chosen to lead the first offensive actions were the 35th RCT against the Mt. Austin area and the 27th RCT against a series of hills called Galloping Horse. The 161st was placed in division reserve minus the 1st Battalion, which was attached to the 27th as a reserve. (Division personnel strength reports for that period show the 161st Infantry Regiment to be seriously under-strength, being short close to 1300 personnel). While in reserve manning defensive positions around the airstrip, named Henderson Airfield, the 161st was also handed the assignment of eliminating a concentration of Japanese troops in what became known as the Matanikau River Pocket. The Pocket, estimated to hold 500 enemy troops, was a dense jungle redoubt positioned between a steep hillside and a high cliff over the Matanikau River. The heavy undergrowth masked the well-camouflaged Japanese positions, both on the ground and high in the trees, and made dislodging them a slow, grim task; however, the combination of frequent patrols, heavy artillery bombardment, and starvation served to eliminate this strongpoint in the end. On 10 January 1943 the offensive was launched and successfully completed by 21 January with the seizure of Galloping Horse by the 27th Infantry and Mount Austin and the Gifu strongpoint by the 35th Infantry.

The second phase of the Corps offensive was to drive to the Poha River. The 161st Infantry was designated to lead the Division attack. The 27th Infantry was to conduct a holding attack on Hill 87 to tie down the Japanese units while the 161st flanked the Japanese positions from the southwest. However the 27th found that the Japanese had withdrawn, thus negating the 161st flanking attack. Because of a feared reinforcement of Japanese forces on Guadalcanal which never came, the 25th Division was ordered to guard the airfields while the 161st Infantry was placed under corps control and ordered to continue the drive north. On 6 February two battalions of the 161st reached the Umasani River and then crossed the Tambalego River. On 8 February they met light Japanese resistance prior to seizing Doma Cove. The next day the 1st Battalion of the 161st linked up with a battalion of the Americal Division at the village of Tenaro effectively ending organized Japanese resistance on Guadalcanal.

The 25th Division remained on Guadalcanal to defend against any Japanese attempts to recapture the island. The 161st along with the rest of the division spent the spring and summer of 1943 training and recuperating.

=== Northern Solomons ===
With Guadalcanal secured, attention turned to recapturing the remaining Solomon Islands, particularly the island of New Georgia where the Japanese had built a key airfield at Munda. Initially the 25th Division, now known as the Tropic Lightning Division for its swift combat actions on Guadalcanal, was not included in the invasion plans for New Georgia as resistance was anticipated to be light. However once US forces landed on New Georgia, Japanese resistance stiffened and Corps requested a regiment from the 25th Division. The 161st was selected, landing on New Georgia on 22 July 1943 and was attached to the 37th Division.

The mission of the 37th Division was to take Bibilo Hill. As the attack commenced the 3rd Battalion of the 161st ran into stiff resistance while approaching the line of departure for the attack, coming under heavy fire from a ridgeline later called Bartley's Ridge. This ridgeline contained numerous pillboxes which were well hidden and mutually supporting.

On 25 July the attack on Bartley's Ridge commenced. While the 3rd Battalion attacked the ridgeline frontally, the 1st Battalion flanked the position. While partially successful the attack stalled. Resuming the attack on 28 July, the 161st was successful in clearing the ridgeline. The regiment then moved on to attack Horseshoe Hill, which had the same type of defenses as Bartley's Ridge. By 1 August, using every weapon available, including flamethrowers, the 161st cleared the hill, pillbox by pillbox and closed on Bibilo Hill.

The XIV Corps ordered the 25th Division to New Georgia on 2 August. The 161st, back under 25th control, along with the 27th Infantry was ordered to attack north from Bibilo Hill and clear the Japanese between them and the sea. The 27th Infantry overcame stiff resistance in their drive to the north. The 161st, probing west of the Bairoko River and on to Bairoko Harbor, found the Japanese had fled before them. On 25 August, the 161st and the 27th linked up and fighting on New Georgia ended.

With the battle for the Solomon Islands over, the Tropic Lightning Division returned to Guadalcanal in early November 1943 and then moved on to New Zealand. Here the division was brought back to full strength and in February 1944 it sailed to New Caledonia for intensive training. Throughout the summer the 25th trained hard from squad level up to division, with the 35th Infantry serving as an opposing force. In the fall the division became proficient in conducting amphibious landings in preparation for its participation in the liberation of the Philippine Islands.

=== Luzon ===
On 9 January 1945 the Sixth Army landed at Lingayen Gulf, Luzon. The 25th Division was held as Army reserve and was not committed to the fighting until 17 January when the 25th Division was assigned to I Corps. Significantly the commitment of the 25th Division brought the return to Luzon after a 46-year absence, of the 1st Washington Volunteer Infantry, now the 161st Infantry, not to fight the Filipinos as their grandfathers had done but to liberate them from their Japanese conquerors.

The 27th and 161st Infantry were given the mission of liberating three villages. Both regiments were entering combat for the first time in over a year. The 27th Infantry encountered only light resistance in taking their objective but the 161st ran into stiff resistance as they attacked the village of Binalonan. The 161st turned back counterattacking Japanese tanks and infantry as they secured the village on 18 January.

The 161st was next given the mission of clearing the town of San Manuel of Japanese forces. The Japanese forces were well dug in and determined to hold San Manual. Seizing the high ground northwest of the town on 22 January, the regiment found itself in a fierce fight with a determined foe. The Japanese force consisted of some 1,000 troops supported by approximately forty tanks. As the 2nd Battalion, 161st Infantry supported by Cannon Company, 161st Infantry advanced to the edge of the town, the Japanese counterattacked. In extreme close combat the brunt of the attack fell on Company E supported by Cannon Company equipped with self-propelled direct-fire 105 mm howitzers. In the two-hour battle Cannon Company destroyed nine enemy tanks as Company E, while sustaining fifty percent casualties in close combat, turned back the Japanese attack. On 25 January the 2nd Battalion resumed its advance into the town led by Cannon Company which destroyed some twenty dug-in enemy tanks and four artillery pieces and some 150 enemy soldiers while the 2nd Battalion inflicted additional heavy casualties on the retreating Japanese forces as the 161st completed the liberation of San Manuel by 28 January. For their extreme gallantry both Company E and Cannon Company were each awarded a Presidential Unit Citation.

The 161st next occupied the recently abandoned village of San Isidro on 6 February. By this date the operation to secure the central plains of Luzon was complete. The I Corps was directed to turn north into the mountains of northern Luzon to attack the main Japanese stronghold.

The 25th Division was given the mission of clearing Highway 5 from San Jose north to the village of Digdig. The 161st cleared the ridges west of the road and the 27th Infantry cleared on the east while the 35th Infantry conducted a flanking movement to the enemy rear. The Japanese put up only minimal resistance and Highway 5 to Digdig was secure by 5 March 1945.

The 25th was directed by I Corps to continue the advance north on Highway 5. The division maintained the same formation with the 161st west of the road, the 27th on the east side and the 35th leading the attack with an enveloping maneuver to take the town of Putlan. The 35th reached the town on 8 March but was halted when the Japanese destroyed the bridge over the Putlan River and put up a fierce defense of the town. The advance was stalled until 10 March when the 27th and 161st relieved the 35th and cleared the Japanese from the area.

On 13 March, I Corps ordered the Tropic Lightning to continue its successful advance up Highway 5 to seize the town of Kapintalan, then attack through Balete Pass to the town of Santa Fe. The area was a series of rugged ridges and thick forests, making progress against a determined, well fortified enemy extremely difficult. The Battle of Belete Pass was to prove to be one of the toughest fights the 25th Division faced in WW II, with all three regimental combat teams seeing heavy combat.

The 1st Battalion of the 161st assaulted Norton's Knob, west of Highway 5 on 15 March 1945. The battalion met heavy opposition from well dug-in Japanese forces. For ten days the battle raged, with the 1st Battalion finally seizing the ridge on 26 March.

At the same time the 3rd Battalion of the 161st attacked Highley Ridge north of Norton Ridge. A heavily defended Japanese position dug into caves on Crump's Hill stopped the battalion's advance. The battle for the hill was stalemated until the battalion captured the west side of Crump's Hill on 8 April. Reinforced by the 2nd Battalion, the 3rd Battalion then eliminated the last Japanese resistance.

Meanwhile, the 35th and 27th Infantry battled to clear Mount Myoko, Kapintalin and Balete Pass. After clearing Crump's Hill the 161st Infantry assaulted the Kembu Plateau west of Balete Pass in support of the overall drive to seize the pass. By 6 May, the 161st secured the plateau. Three days later, on 9 May, the 161st linked up with the 27th Infantry at Balete Pass, opening the pass for the advance to the town of Santa Fe.

On 19 May the 25th resumed its drive along Highway 5. The 35th attacked astride the highway with the 27th on the right flank and the 161st advancing on the west side of the highway. On 22 May the 161st turned west to clear the Japanese off of Mount Haruna and then continued north over the Haruna ridge to reach the Villa Verde Trail, west of Santa Fe. Except for mopping up actions in support of the clearing of the Old Spanish Trail by the 27th and 35th Infantry, there were no further major combat actions conducted by the 161st Infantry before the campaign for Luzon was officially declared ended on 4 July 1945.

The 25th Infantry Division then went into rest and recuperation. It had served in continuous combat longer than any division in the Sixth Army. Plans called for the division to take part in the invasion of Japan and exercises for the assault landings were undertaken. But with the dropping of the atomic bombs on Hiroshima and Nagasaki the war ended, and soldiers of the 25th could land on Japanese soil without taking casualties.

The 161st Infantry entered Japan peacefully, as the regiment had done as the 1st Washington Volunteers after the Philippine Insurrection. The stay of the 161st in Japan, however, would only be slightly longer than its stay in 1899. On 1 November 1945, the 161st Infantry Regiment was inactivated and replaced on that date by the 4th Infantry Regiment.

The 161st Infantry Regiment had one Medal of Honor recipient during the war: Technician Fourth Grade Laverne Parrish

== Operation Iraqi Freedom ==
The 1st Battalion, 161st along with the other elements of the 81st Armor Brigade was called to federal service in 2003 and arrived in Iraq in April 2004. The 1st Battalion, 161st Infantry was attached to the 3rd Brigade, 1st Cavalry Division. The battalion was based at Logistical Support Area Highlander adjacent to the International (Green) Zone in Baghdad. The battalion provided security for the Green Zone and conducted full spectrum operations in southeast Baghdad. There the 161 faced stiff opposition from the Mahdi Army, led by Shiite Cleric Al Sadr. This area of operations was the largest battalion level area of responsibility in the 1st Cavalry Division. The 1st Battalion completed its tour of duty and returned home in April 2005.

The 1st Battalion, 161st deployed to Iraq again in 2008 where it was tasked with providing security for logistic convoys throughout most of northern Iraq. The battalion was stationed out of Balad among other remote bases.

== Lineage ==
Constituted and organized 9 March 1886 and 7 April 1887 from existing companies in the Washington Territorial Militia as the 1st (west of Cascade Mountains) and 2d (east of Cascade Mountains) Regiments of Infantry

(Active militia Washington Territory redesignated Washington [Territory] National Guard 28 January 1888)

2d Infantry Regiment reorganized and redesignated 23 July 1895 as 1st Infantry Battalion

1st Infantry Regiment reorganized and redesignated in 1897 as 2d Infantry Battalion

Elements of 1st and 2d Infantry Battalions consolidated in part, redesignated 1st Regiment, Washington Volunteer Infantry, and mustered into Federal service 6–13 May 1898 at Tacoma; mustered out 1 November 1899 at San Francisco, California

Remaining companies of 1st and 2d Infantry Battalions reorganized as Independent Battalion, Washington Volunteer Infantry, and mustered into Federal service 2–15 July 1898 at Tacoma; mustered out 28 October 1898 at Vancouver Barracks

Elements reorganized and consolidated with 1st and 2d Infantry Regiments, Washington National Guard. (organized in 1898), and redesignated 9 November 1899 as 1st Infantry Regiment

Redesignated in May 1903 as 2d Infantry Regiment

(Companies C, K, and M withdrawn, converted, and redesignated 5th, 3d, and 2d Companies, Coast Artillery Reserve Corps; Company A disbanded, then reorganized in 1909 as 4th Company, Coast Artillery Corps)

Mustered into Federal service 28 June 1916 at Camp Elmer M. Brown, Washington, for Mexican Border; mustered out 8 October 1916 at American Lake

Called into Federal service 25 March 1917; drafted into Federal service 5 August 1917

Consolidated with elements of 3d Infantry Regiment, District of Columbia National Guard, and redesignated 19 September 1917 as 161st Infantry, an element of the 41st Infantry Division (United States)

Demobilized 1–8 March 1919 at Camp Dix, New Jersey and Camp Dodge, Iowa

State of Washington elements reorganized 1 January 1921 in the Washington National Guard as 161st Infantry; assigned to the 41st Division

(1st Battalion and Supply Company withdrawn, converted, and redesignated 10 May 1921 as 146th Field Artillery Regiment (United States))

Inducted into Federal service 16 September 1940 at Spokane

Relieved from assignment to the 41st Division 14 February 1942

Assigned to the 25th Infantry Division (United States) 3 August 1942

Relieved from assignment to the 25th Infantry Division and inactivated 1 November 1945 at Nagoya, Japan

Assigned to the 41st Division 17 June 1946

Reorganized and Federally recognized 24 March 1947 with headquarters at Spokane

Reorganized 15 April 1959 as 161st Infantry, a parent regiment under the Combat Arms Regimental System, to consist of the 1st and 2d Battle Groups, elements of the 41st Infantry Division

Reorganized 1 March 1963 to consist of the 1st and 2d Battalions

Reorganized 1 January 1968 to consist of the 1st, 2d, and 3d Battalions, elements of 81st Infantry Brigade

Reorganized 1 May 1971 to consist of the 1st and 3d Battalions, elements of 81st Infantry Brigade, and the 2d Battalion

Reorganized 1 January 1974 to consist of the 1st and 3d Battalions, elements of 81st Infantry Brigade

Withdrawn 1 May 1989 from the Combat Arms Regimental System and reorganized under the United States Army Regimental System with headquarters at Spokane

Reorganized 1 October 1998: Retaining the 1st Battalion as an element of the 81st Infantry Brigade, Headquarters remaining in Spokane; one company moved to Kent; Deactivating the 3rd Battalion, Headquarters and Headquarters Company (HHC) in Kent; Detachment 1, HHC (Puyallup); Company A (Kent); Company B (Kent), Company C (Redmond), Company D (Kent), and Company E (Shelton).

== Regimental honors ==
Ribbon	Award	Year	Subordinate Elements	Embroidered	Notes
	Philippine Presidential Unit Citation	1944-1945	Entire Regiment	17 OCTOBER 1944 TO 4 JULY 1945	
	Meritorious Unit Commendation	2004-2005	1st Battalion	IRAQ 2004–2005	Permanent Order 202–27, 21 July 2009
	Meritorious Unit Commendation	2008-2009	1st Battalion	IRAQ 2008–2009	Permanent Order 202–27, 21 July 2009

== Campaigns ==
Conflict	Streamer	Year(s)
Philippine–American War	Manila	4 February-17 March 1899
Philippine–American War	Luzon	1899
World War I	No Inscription	
World War II	Guadalcanal	1942-1943
World War II	Northern Solomons	1943-1944
World War II	Luzon	1944-1945
Operation Iraqi Freedom	Iraqi Governance	2004
Operation Iraqi Freedom	National Resolution	2005
Operation Iraqi Freedom	Iraqi Surge	2008
Operation Iraqi Freedom	Iraqi Sovereignty	2009
