= Oscar Hilman =

United States Army general

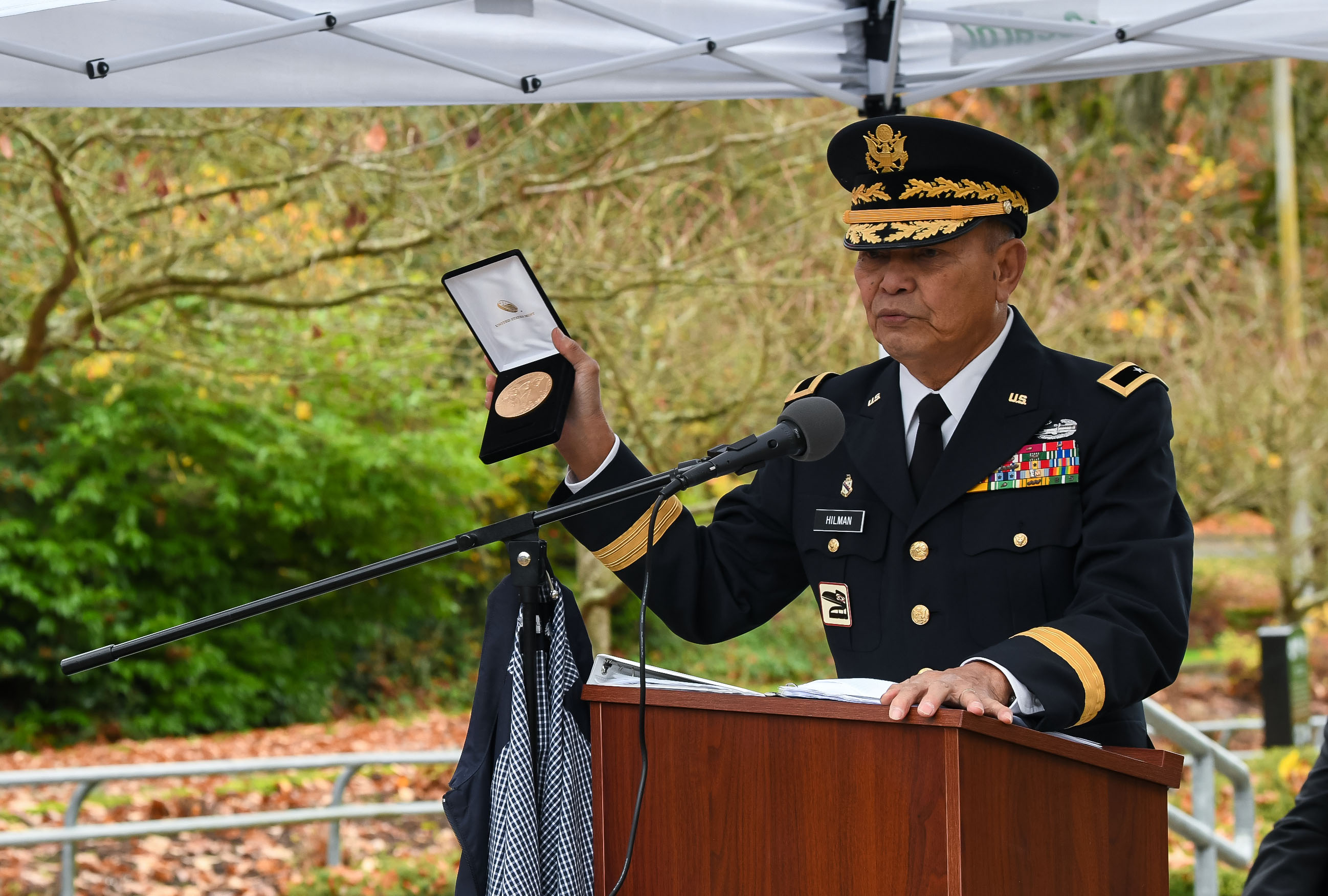
- Oscar Hillman in 2024
- Born: 1950 (age 75–76); Libmanan, Camarines Sur
- Military career
- Allegiance: United States of America
- Branch: United States Army
- Service years: 1969-2004
- Rank: Brigadier General
- Unit: 81st Heavy Armor Brigade

Oscar Hilman (born 1950), is a Filipino American, Brigadier General or BG, and US Army Commander of the Heavy Armor Brigade at Joint Base Balad and Logistics Area Anaconda aka Camp Anaconda, formerly known as Al-Bakr Air Base (Arabic: قاعدة البكر الجوية)in Iraq. In Iraq, he was tasked to prevent troop and allied forces withdrawals from Camp Anaconda, one of the largest US military bases in Iraq. In a series of town hall meetings, he spoke to the Filipino workers—often in Tagalog—and persuaded them to stay put by assuring them of their safety in camp. To show good faith, he gave the contractors base privileges, a move that was approved by the US chain of command.

== Biography ==
Oscar Hilman was born in Libmanan, Camarines Sur, Philippines. He later grew up in Cebu City. While living in the Philippines, Hilman studied at the Philippine College of Criminology in Manila. His mother and his siblings left for the United States for a better life. When he graduated with a Bachelor of Science in Criminology in 1968, Hilman returned to Cebu City and was not successful in landing any good jobs. He missed his family dearly and decided to move to the United States to be with his family.

The serving of the military runs deep in Hilman's family. Though he was born in the Philippines BG Hilman's family suffered a tremendous loss when his grandfather and uncle perished in the Bataan Death March. BG Hilman's was inspired to join the military by his father who was a U.S. Navy Master Chief. Hilman was interested in the military and attended Preparatory Military Training and Reserved Officers Training Courses (ROTC) while he attended college in the Philippines. Hilman signed up with the United States Selective Services shortly after he arrived to the United States. After joining a Philippine military academy, he received a draft notice and decided to enlist in the U.S. Army. In June 1969, he was drafted into the United States Army.

While being enlisted in the US Army, he served as a medic, and finance and supply sergeant for nine years. As a 27-year-old Sergeant First Class, he was noticed by a two-star general who encouraged him to apply for Officer Candidate School (OCS). Thereafter, he was commissioned as a 2nd Lieutenant at the Washington Military Academy. Following his completion of specialty training in Armor Basic and Advanced courses, Hilman became a tank commander. His ambitions were modest. "When I made lieutenant, I just wanted to retire as a major, as I had been told to always aspire two grades up."

As an officer, Hilman steadily climbed the officer ranks, through the company grade level, battalion level, and ultimately as a commander of the Combat Support Battalion to the 803rd Armored Cavalry. When Colonel Hilman became the Director of Plans, Operations and Training for the Washington National Guard; he was on his way to a higher level of command. In January 2003, he was promoted to Brigadier General where he assumed command of the 81st Brigade Combat Team.

Throughout his military career Hilman has consistently displayed the Filipino values of loyalty, hard work, and humility. Of his successes in the promotion ladder, he states, "I'd study hard and made sure that in every training, I would land in the top percent of my class. People notice you if you do the work." Of his secret to getting coveted assignments, "I was always loyal to my bosses who would then recommend me for higher command positions." When it was pointed out that he is one of only six Fil-Ams who made the rank of General in the US Armed Forces, he laughed, "I think I'm the only American general who talks with a Filipino accent."

== Challenge in Iraq ==
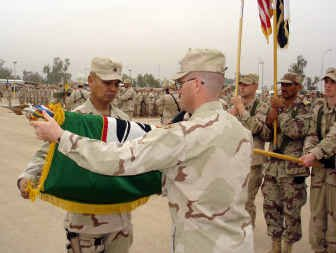
BG Hilman and CSM Barr casing the 81st Brigade Combat Team's Colors in Iraq, 2005

In 2004, BG Hilman's unit was deployed to Iraq. He was tasked with the protection of Camp Anaconda. It was located in the north of Baghdad and was in a critical war zone within the Sunni Triangle. Camp Anaconda was the second most trafficked airport on the globe, which housed 28,0000 soldiers and 8,000 civilian contract workers. Due to the strategic military importance and size, Camp Anaconda was the target of 40 to 50 mortar attacks a day. The camp was also nicknamed "Mortaritaville". During a unit meeting, a soldier questioned Hilman about why they were not going after insurgents, he revealed that the requests for reinforcements had been denied by the Pentagon. The American news media and politicians of Washington, DC caught wind of this and propagated the story as an indecisiveness of the Defense Department. With the political maelstrom of incessant phone calls from senators and congressman, Hilman avoided this conflict by taking a vacation.

Despite the controversial events and of perils of being in the epicenter of the war zone, BG Hilman is noted for being a "true warrior" for his stint in Iraq. When he left the Iraq war front in 2005, mortar attacks on Camp Anaconda were significantly reduced by 60 percent, while mortar hits were far from the populated zones of the camp. His unit also suffered minimal losses: nine soldiers out of the 4,500 officers and men under him. Hilman proudly says, "I felt I have really done my bit to serve my country."

Furthermore, it is remarkable that while serving his adopted country, Hilman's career of service came full circle with his Filipino roots when he took it upon himself to look after the welfare of his fellow Kababayans. By improving the living conditions of Filipinos in the military base in Balad, Iraq, he was, in effect, also serving his native land. Also, he believes he has lived the American dream by stating "I think that I have been successful by giving my bosses and soldiers what they expect, this is the best country in the world for opportunity."

On behalf of the Overseas Filipino Workers (OFWs), Hilman's work did not go unnoticed by the Philippine government either. In the Fall of 2004, Hilman was offered, through diplomatic channels, the Philippine Humanitarian Award in Manila. However, a highlight of working with his fellow Kababayans, the OFWs welcomed him as a fellow countryman and would often ask Hilman for his autograph or to pose with them for photos. While embracing his cultural values, Hilman organized a regular Saturday camp cookout during his time at Camp Anaconda. This weekly event was well attended by many contractors. It was like a home away from home that the Filipino contractors banded together and built their own dining facility within the camp. "It was still there when I left," the general says. "In fact, they even threw a big farewell party for me. They cooked four kambings (goats)."
