= 82nd Infantry Division (Russian Empire) =

- 82-я пехотная дивизия
- Active: 1914–1918
- Country: Russian Empire
- Branch: Russian Imperial Army
- Role: Infantry

The 82nd Infantry Division' (Russian: 82-я пехотная дивизия, 82-ya Pekhotnaya Diviziya) was an infantry formation of the Russian Imperial Army.

== Organization ==
- 1st Brigade
  - 325th Infantry Regiment
  - 326th Infantry Regiment
- 2nd Brigade
  - 327th Infantry Regiment
  - 328th Infantry Regiment
