= 82 Squadron =

82 Squadron or 82nd Squadron may refer to:

- No. 82 Squadron RAF a unit of the Royal Air Force
- No. 82 Squadron RAAF, a unit of the Royal Australian Air Force
- 82nd Aerial Targets Squadron, a unit of the United States Air Force
- 82nd Expeditionary Rescue Squadron, a unit of the United States Air Force
- VFA-82 (Fighter Attack Squadron 82), a unit of the United States Navy
- VF-82 (Fighter Squadron 82), a unit of the United States Navy
- VP-82 (Patrol Squadron 82), a unit of the United States Navy

== See also ==
- 82nd Division (disambiguation)
- 82nd Regiment (disambiguation)
