= James Dalton II =

United States Army general

James Leo Dalton II
- James Dalton (left) with Douglas MacArthur, most likely on Luzon in 1945
- Born: January 20, 1910; New Britain, Connecticut
- Died: May 16, 1945 (aged 35); Luzon, Commonwealth of the Philippines
- Military career
- Allegiance: United States of America
- Branch: United States Army
- Service years: 1933–1945
- Rank: Brigadier general
- Nickname: Dusty
- Commands: 161st Infantry Regiment
- Conflicts: World War II: Guadalcanal Campaign; New Georgia Campaign; Battle of Luzon
- Awards: Distinguished Service Cross; Silver Star (twice); Legion of Merit; Bronze Star (twice); Air Medal; Purple Heart

James Leo Dalton II (January 20, 1910 – May 16, 1945) was a general and commander of United States Army forces during World War II. He graduated from West Point in 1933 and earned the Silver Star during the strategically significant Guadalcanal Campaign in which he commanded the 161st Infantry Regiment as a colonel.

Dalton later commanded the 161st during the New Georgia Campaign in 1943 and Battle of Luzon in 1945 before being promoted and reassigned as assistant commander of the 25th Infantry Division. He was killed by a Japanese sniper during the Battle of Balete Pass on May 16, 1945.

== Birth and schooling ==
Dalton was born in New Britain, Connecticut but moved to Naugatuck with his family at a very young age. There he attended Saint Francis of Assisi School, and in 1927 he graduated from Naugatuck High School. In 1929 he entered West Point, graduating in 1933, when he transferred from cavalry to infantry.

== Early military history ==
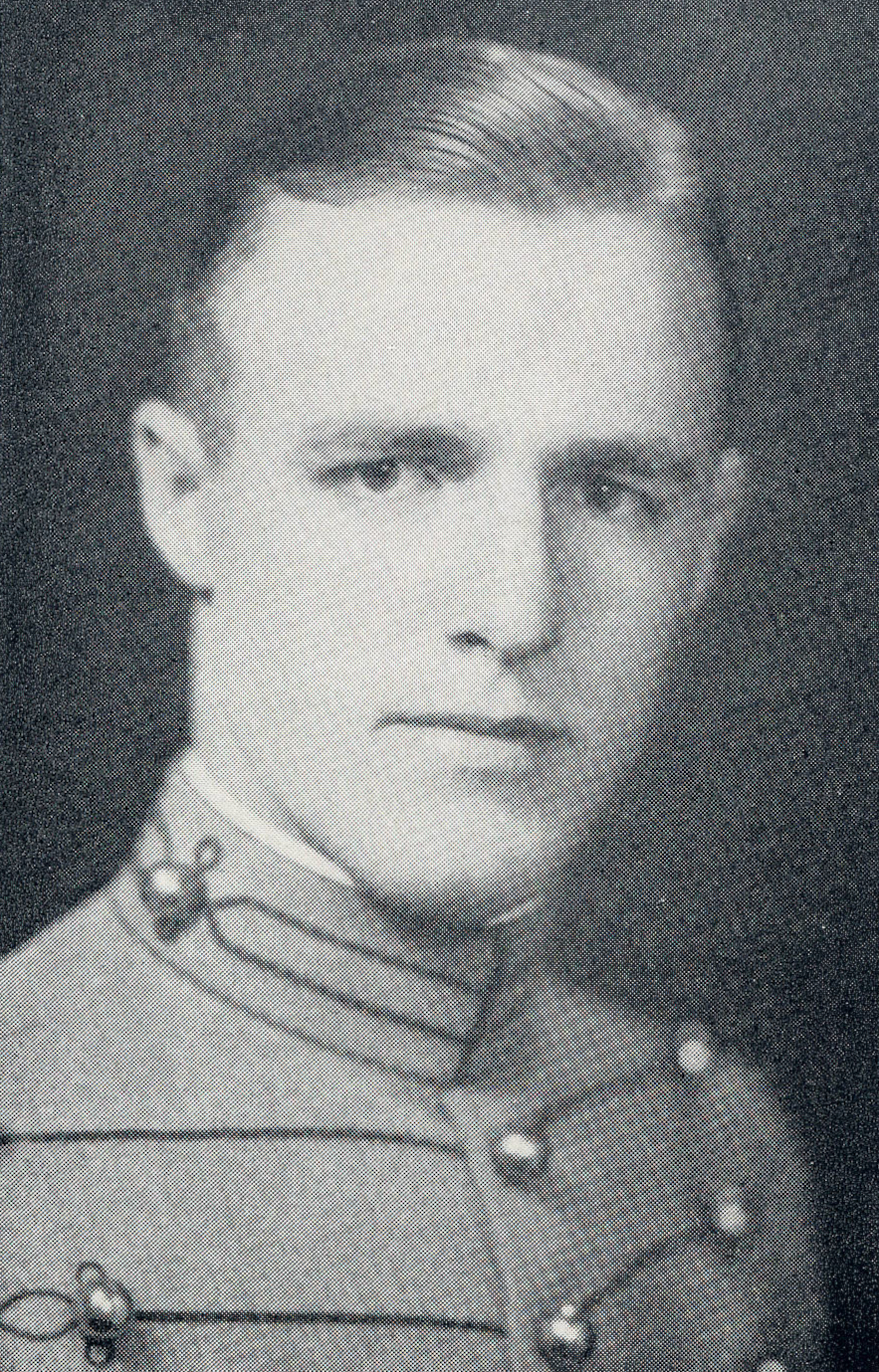
Dalton as a United States Military Academy cadet c. 1933

Dalton was posted at Pearl Harbor during the Japanese attack in 1941 and in January 1943 his regiment, the 161st Rifle (Infantry) Regiment, was sent to Guadalcanal, as part of the 25th Infantry Division's deployment to the island. The 161st took part in the final weeks of the campaign. For his duties during this campaign, Dalton was awarded the Silver Star and was promoted to lieutenant-colonel, then colonel.

Dalton was given command of the 161st in the closing days of the Guadalcanal Campaign after its previous commander, Colonel Clarence Orndorff, was ordered back to the United States to recover from malaria. Initially, the 161st was a National Guard regiment, but having seen combat in the Guadalcanal campaign and taken in many replacements the regiment gradually had lost that title. After Guadalcanal the 161st was ordered to New Georgia Island to link up with the 145th and 148th Infantry Regiments, in an attempt to take out the Japanese airfield at Munda Point. On arrival at New Georgia Island on July 22, 1943, Dalton's regiment was placed under the command of General Robert S. Beightler. In a difficult campaign, in which his regiment was unable to make gains due to heavy enemy defensive positions, Dalton's regiment was also blamed by Colonel Baxter of the 148th for failures in the field. Beighter, although a fellow Ohio Guardsman of Baxter, decided that Dalton's command was sound and was able to remove Baxter from his position through a fortuitous element of Baxter's ill health.

== Later military service and death ==
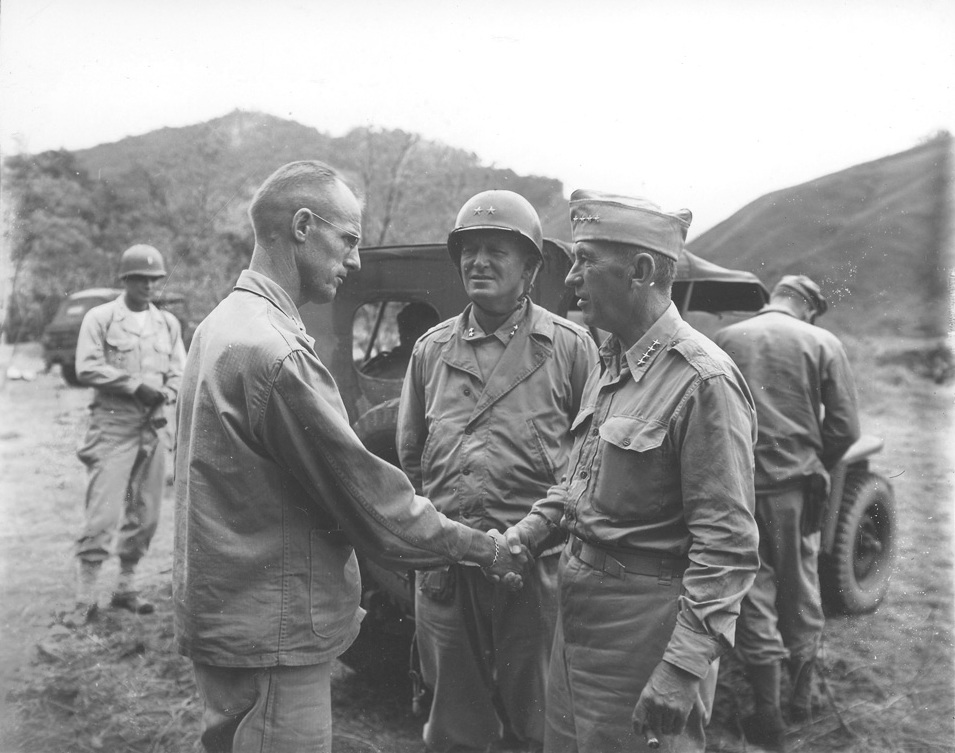
Dalton (left) greets General Walter Krueger on Luzon U.S. Army Signal Corps photograph dated 4/15/1945.

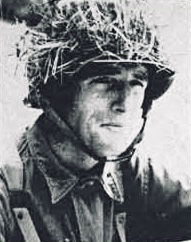
BG JAMES LEO DALTON II

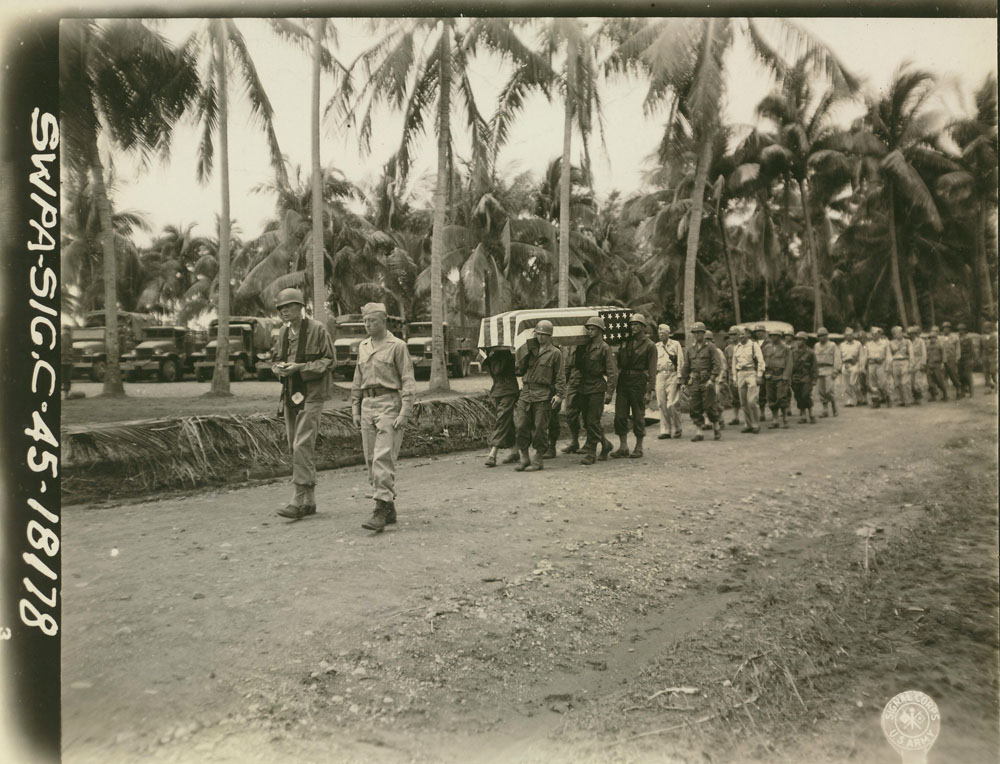
Funeral procession on Luzon for General Dalton two days after his death.

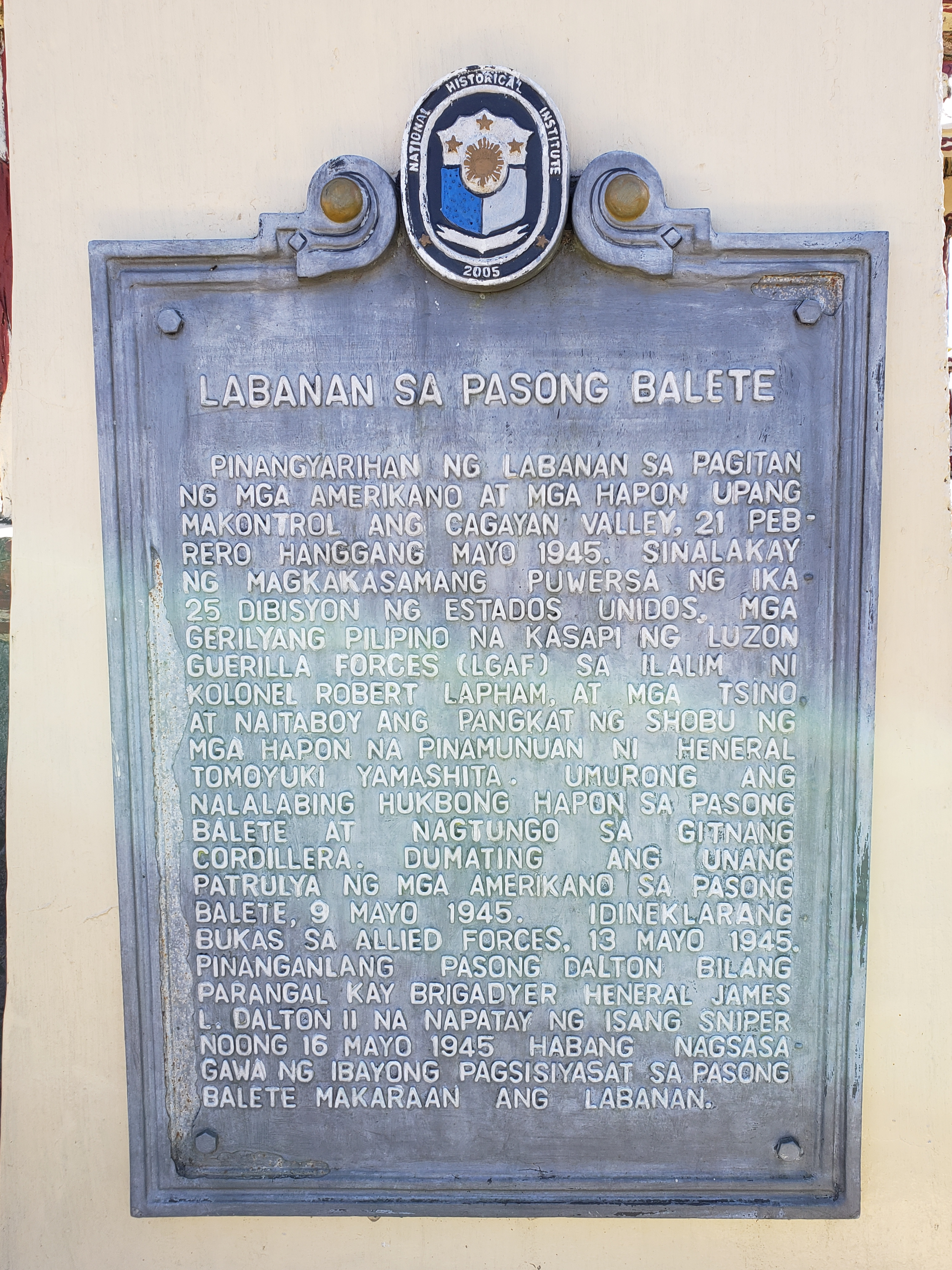
Philippine historical marker for Dalton Pass

After the 161st was deployed to the Philippines during the Battle of Luzon, Dalton was promoted to brigadier general and reassigned as assistant commanding general of the 25th Infantry Division. Soon after, Dalton was killed in action by a Japanese sniper during the Battle of Balete Pass on May 16, 1945. The pass where Dalton died was renamed in his honor after the battle, and is referred to as Dalton Pass today. Dalton was one of only 11 US general officers killed in action during World War II.

Dalton was buried at USAFE Cemetery #1, Santa Barbara, Pangasinan, Luzon on May 18, 1945. His remains, like the other documented American soldiers who were killed and buried in various wartime cemeteries during the ongoing fighting, were later interred in the Manila American Cemetery (Plot D, Row 15, Grave 109)
