= Laverne Parrish =

United States Army Medal of Honor recipient (1918–1945)

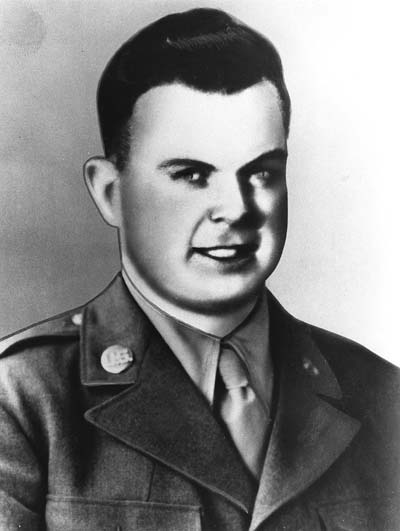
- Technician Fourth Grade Laverne Parrish
- Born: July 16, 1918; Knox City, Missouri, US
- Died: January 24, 1945 (aged 26) near San Manuel, Luzon, Philippines
- Burial place: Mountain View Cemetery, Ronan, Montana
- Military career
- Allegiance: United States of America
- Branch: United States Army
- Service years: 1941–1945
- Rank: Technician Fourth Grade
- Units: 161st Infantry Regiment, 25th Infantry Division
- Conflicts: World War II
- Awards: Medal of Honor

Laverne Parrish (July 16, 1918 – January 24, 1945) was a United States Army soldier and a recipient of the United States military's highest decoration—the Medal of Honor—for his actions in World War II.

== Biography ==
Parrish joined the Army from Ronan, Montana in March 1941, and by January 18, 1945, was serving as a technician fourth grade in the Medical Detachment of the 161st Infantry Regiment, 25th Infantry Division. On that day, at Binalonan on the island of Luzon in the Philippines, he exposed himself to enemy fire in order to aid two wounded soldiers. Six days later, on January 24, near San Manuel, he again braved hostile fire to tend to the wounded, carrying five men to safety and treating dozens more before being mortally wounded himself. He was posthumously awarded the Medal of Honor six months later, on July 13, 1945.

Parrish, aged 26 at his death, was buried in Mountain View Cemetery, Ronan, Montana.

== Medal of Honor citation ==
Technician Parrish's official Medal of Honor citation reads:

He was medical aid man with Company C during the fighting in Binalonan, Luzon, Philippine Islands. On the 18th, he observed 2 wounded men under enemy fire and immediately went to their rescue. After moving 1 to cover, he crossed 25 yards of open ground to administer aid to the second. In the early hours of the 24th, his company, crossing an open field near San Manuel, encountered intense enemy fire and was ordered to withdraw to the cover of a ditch. While treating the casualties, Technician Parrish observed 2 wounded still in the field. Without hesitation he left the ditch, crawled forward under enemy fire, and in 2 successive trips brought both men to safety. He next administered aid to 12 casualties in the same field, crossing and re-crossing the open area raked by hostile fire. Making successive trips, he then brought 3 wounded in to cover. After treating nearly all of the 37 casualties suffered by his company, he was mortally wounded by mortar fire, and shortly after was killed. The indomitable spirit, intrepidity, and gallantry of Technician Parrish saved many lives at the cost of his own.

== Awards and Decorations ==

Badge	Combat Medical Badge		
1st row	Medal of Honor	Bronze Star Medal	Purple Heart
2nd row	Army Good Conduct Medal	American Defense Service Medal	American Campaign Medal
3rd row	Asiatic-Pacific Campaign Medal with 3 Campaign stars	World War II Victory Medal	Philippine Liberation Medal with 1 Campaign star
Unit awards	Presidential Unit Citation		Philippine Presidential Unit Citation

== See also ==
- List of Medal of Honor recipients
- List of Medal of Honor recipients for World War II
