= 82nd Cavalry Regiment =

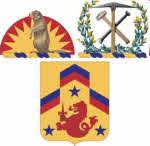
- 82nd Cavalry Rgt coat of arms
- Active: 1959–present
- Country: United States
- Branch: Oregon Army National Guard
- Type: Light cavalry
- Role: Reconnaissance and surveillance
- Motto: Temeritas
- Engagements: World War II; Operation Iraqi Freedom; Operation Enduring Freedom; Hurricane Katrina/Rita Relief

Commanders
- Commander: LTC Richard Nicolas
- Command Sergeant Major: John Zagyva

Insignia
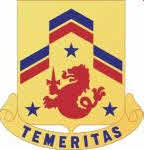
- Distinctive unit insignia

The 82nd Cavalry Regiment is a parent regiment in the United States Army National Guard. It is represented in the Oregon Army National Guard by the 1st Squadron, 82nd Cavalry, part of the 81st Stryker Brigade Combat Team.

== History ==
The 82nd Cavalry was originally constituted on 25 March 1959 as the 82nd Armor, a Combat Arms Regimental System (CARS) parent regiment in the Oregon Army National Guard. It was organized on 1 April 1959, consisting of the 1st Reconnaissance Squadron at Silverton, part of the 41st Infantry Division. The squadron became the 1st Squadron, 82nd Cavalry, on 1 March 1963. It was redesignated to consist of the 1st Squadron in the 41st Division and Troop E in the 41st Infantry Brigade on 15 November 1965. Troop E was reorganized from Troop B of the 1st Squadron at Woodburn. On 1 March 1968, it was reorganized to consist of Troop E, part of the 41st Infantry Brigade.

The regiment was withdrawn from CARS on 1 September 1989 and reorganized under United States Army Regimental System in the Nevada Army National Guard and Oregon Army National Guard to consist of the 1st Battalion, part of the 116th Cavalry Brigade. On 1 September 1992 the 1st Battalion in the Oregon Army National Guard was redesignated the 1st Squadron, also losing its Nevada elements. It was again reorganized on 1 October 1995 to include Troop E, part of the 41st Infantry Brigade, Troop F, part of the 29th Infantry Brigade, and Troop G, part of the 116th Cavalry Brigade.

Originally 1–82 Cavalry was a TDA squadron headquarters of 15 personnel with ADCON (administrative control) responsibilities over three independent Brigade Reconnaissance Troops (BRTs) - E, F, and G, respectively. Each troop was aligned with separate brigades. E Troop with the 41st IBCT (Oregon ARNG), F Troop with the 29th IBCT (Hawaii ARNG), and G Troop with 116th ACR (Idaho ARNG).

G Troop deployed to Iraq in 2004 and was reassigned to the Montana Army National Guard's 1st Battalion, 163rd Infantry in October. While serving in Iraq, the troop was awarded the Valorous Unit Award by Permanent Orders 144–10 on 22 May 2008 for the period between 15 February and 1 November 2005.

Troop F was ordered into active Federal service on 16 August 2004 at Lebanon, and deployed as a Brigade Reconnaissance Troop of the 29th Brigade Combat Team during Operation Iraqi Freedom III in 2005 and 2006. The troop conducted operations in the vicinity of Balad throughout this period. It returned to the states and was released from active Federal service, reverting to state control on 15 March 2006.

On 1 October 2005 the 82nd Cavalry was officially redesignated as the 82nd Cavalry Regiment when the United States Army reintroduced the regiment designation. On 1 September 2006, the regiment was reorganized to consist of the 1st Squadron with headquarters at Bend.

In 2007, the 41st IBCT underwent a transformation, which involved the inactivation of the 1st Battalion, 162nd Infantry and the standing up of the 1st Squadron, 82nd Cavalry as a full RSTA squadron using elements from the TDA headquarters, three brigade reconnaissance troops, and the 1st Battalion, 162nd Infantry.

On 2 May 2009, the 1st Squadron was ordered into active Federal service. The squadron deployed to Iraq from 2009 and 2010 as a full reconnaissance squadron, responsible for overseeing security for the Joint Visitors Bureau and the Camp Victory Base Complex, as well as for the supply convoys supporting the Forward operating bases in the Baghdad metropolitan area. On 5 June 2010 it was released from active Federal service and reverted to state control. For service in Iraq, the squadron was awarded the Meritorious Unit Commendation by Permanent Orders 211–01 on 30 July 2010.

Between 2013 and 2014, it deployed to Afghanistan.

In 2015, 1–82 Cavalry was selected as the Oregon unit to participate in the West Coast Stryker Brigade transformation of the 81st ABCT (Washington ARNG). In 2017, they remained located in Oregon but again aligned out of the state as the Stryker RSTA squadron for the new 81st Stryker Brigade Combat Team.

The 1st Squadron, 82nd Cavalry Regiment, currently serves with the 81st Stryker Brigade Combat Team (United States) of the Washington Army National Guard. It is headquartered in Bend, Oregon. The unit consists of the HHT (Bend, Oregon), Alpha Troop (of Albany, Oregon), Bravo Troop (of Redmond, Oregon), Charlie Troop (of Portland, Oregon), Delta Troop (of The Dalles, Oregon), and Delta Company (FSC) (of Prineville, Oregon).

As a cavalry unit, Alpha, Bravo, and Charlie Troops are equipped with reconnaissance variant Strykers while Delta Troop (Heavy Weapons Troop) is equipped with three platoons of ATGM Strykers and three platoons of MGS Strykers. When the squadron was redesignated, it was changed to a RSTA unit (reconnaissance, surveillance, and target acquisition).

== Distinctive unit insignia ==
- Description

A gold color metal and enamel device 1 1/8 inches (2.9 cm) in height overall consisting of a shield blazoned: Or, a chevron enhanced rompu parti per chevron Azure and Gules in base between three mullets one and two of the second, a sea lion of the third. Attached below the shield a Gold scroll inscribed "TEMERITAS" in Blue letters.

- Symbolism

Yellow is a color traditionally associated with armor and cavalry units. The bi-colored forward thrust of the chevron refers to the predecessor unit's two assault landings (in New Guinea and in the Southern Philippines) during World War II. The sea lion and stars are taken from the Philippine Presidential Seal in reference to the action for which the parent unit was awarded the Philippine Presidential Unit Citation.

- Background

The distinctive unit insignia was originally approved for the 82d Armor Regiment, Oregon National Guard on 21 January 1963. It was redesignated for the 82d Cavalry Regiment, Oregon National Guard on 12 December 1963. The insignia was amended to revise the description and symbolism on 11 January 1989.

== Coat of arms ==
=== Blazon ===
- Shield

Or, a chevron enhanced rompu parti per chevron Azure and Gules in base between three mullets one and two of the second, a sea lion of the third.

- Crest

That for the regiments and separate battalions of the Oregon and Nevada Army National Guard, in the order in which they were admitted to the Union: OREGON: On a wreath of the colors Or and Azure, a demi-disc Gules charged with the setting sun with twelve light rays Or (the shoulder sleeve insignia of the 41st Division), behind a beaver sejant Proper. NEVADA: On a wreath of the colors Or and Azure, within a garland of sagebrush a sledge hammer and miner's drill crossed in saltire behind a pickax in pale Proper. Motto TEMERITAS (Temerity).

=== Symbolism ===
- Shield

Yellow is a color traditionally associated with Armor and Cavalry units. The bi-colored forward thrust of the chevron refers to the predecessor unit's two assault landings (in New Guinea and in the Southern Philippines) during World War II. The sea lion and stars are taken from the Philippine Presidential Seal in reference to the action for which the parent unit was awarded the Philippine Presidential Unit Citation. Crest The crests are those of the Oregon and Nevada Army National Guard.

=== Background ===
The coat of arms was originally approved for the 82d Armor Regiment, Oregon National Guard on 21 January 1963. It was redesignated for the 82d Cavalry Regiment, Oregon National Guard on 12 December 1963. The insignia was amended to add the crest of the state of Nevada and revise the symbolism on 11 January 1989.

== See also ==
- List of armored and cavalry regiments of the United States Army
