= 82nd Regiment =

82nd Regiment or 82nd Infantry Regiment may refer to:

- 82nd Regiment of Foot (1777)
- 82nd Regiment of Foot (Prince of Wales's Volunteers)
- 82nd Infantry Regiment (PA), Philippine Commonwealth Army
- 82nd Infantry Regiment "Torino", Italian Army
- 82nd Armoured Regiment, Indian Army
- 82nd Field Artillery Regiment, United States Army
- 82nd Aviation Regiment, United States Army
- 82nd Cavalry Regiment, United States Army
- 82nd (Essex) Heavy Anti-Aircraft Regiment, Royal Artillery

== American Civil War regiments ==
- 82nd Illinois Volunteer Infantry Regiment, a unit of the Union (Northern) Army
- 82nd Indiana Infantry Regiment, a unit of the Union (Northern) Army
- 82nd New York Volunteer Infantry Regiment, a unit of the Union (Northern) Army
- 82nd Ohio Infantry, a unit of the Union (Northern) Army
- 82nd Pennsylvania Infantry, a unit of the Union (Northern) Army

== See also ==
- 82nd Brigade (disambiguation)
- 82nd Division (disambiguation)
- 82nd Squadron (disambiguation)
