= 82nd Division =

In military terms, 82nd Division may refer to:

== Infantry divisions ==
- 82nd Infantry Division (Wehrmacht), Germany
- 82nd Reserve Division, German Empire
- 82nd Division (Nigeria)
- 82nd Infantry Division (Russian Empire)
- 82nd Rifle Division (1932–1940), the 82nd Territorial Rifle Division, Soviet Union
- 82nd Motor Rifle Division (1940–1942), Soviet Union, briefly designated the 82nd Motorized Division in 1941
- 82nd Rifle Division (1942–1945), Soviet Union
- 82nd Guards Rifle Division, 1943–1947, Soviet Union
- 82nd Motor Rifle Division (1957–1958), Soviet Union
- 82nd (West Africa) Division, United Kingdom
- 82nd Airborne Division, United States

== Cavalry divisions ==
- 82nd Cavalry Division, Soviet Union

== See also ==
- List of military divisions by number
- 82nd Brigade (disambiguation)
- 82nd Regiment (disambiguation)
- 82nd Squadron (disambiguation)
