= 82 =

82 may refer to:

- 82 (number), the natural number following 81 and preceding 83
- One of the years 82 BC, AD 82, 1982, 2082
- The international calling code for South Korea
- 82 (album), A studio album by Kenyan electronic music band Just a Band
- Messier 82 A Starburst Galaxy
- 82 Alkmene, a main-belt asteroid
- Tatra 82, a truck

== See also ==
- 82nd (disambiguation)
- Lead, chemical element with atomic number 82
- List of highways numbered 82
