= 82nd Brigade =

82nd Brigade may refer to:

== China ==
- 82nd Motorized Infantry Brigade (People's Republic of China)

== Poland ==
- Polish 82nd Infantry Regiment

== Russia/Soviet Union ==
- 82nd Anti-Aircraft Rocket Brigade

== Spain ==
- 82nd Mixed Brigade

== Ukraine ==
- 82nd Air Assault Brigade

== United Kingdom ==
- 82nd Brigade (United Kingdom)
- 82nd Brigade, Royal Field Artillery, a British Army unit in World War I
- 82nd (Welsh) Brigade, Royal Field Artillery, a British Army unit after World War I

== United States ==
- 82nd Sustainment Brigade

== Yugoslavia ==
- 82nd Aviation Brigade

== See also ==
- 82nd Division (disambiguation)
- 82nd Regiment (disambiguation)
