= Idaho Army National Guard =

Component of the US Army and military of the state of Idaho

Headquarters, State Area Command Idaho Army National Guard
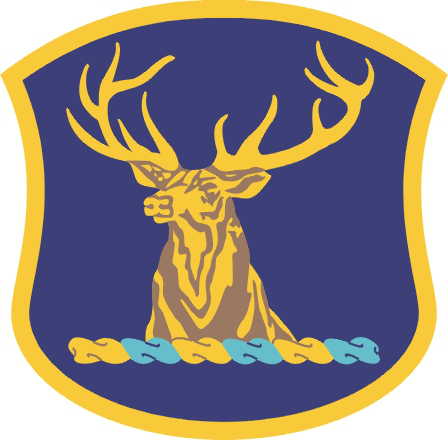
- Idaho National Guard Headquarters SSI
- Country: United States
- Allegiance: Idaho
- Branch: United States Army National Guard
- Type: ARNG Headquarters Command
- Role: Armed Forces
- Part of: Idaho National Guard
- Garrison/HQ: Boise, Idaho

Insignia
- Idaho ARNG Crest

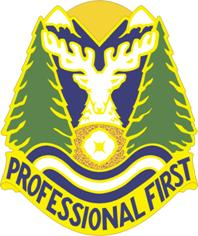
- Idaho ARNG Headquarters DUI

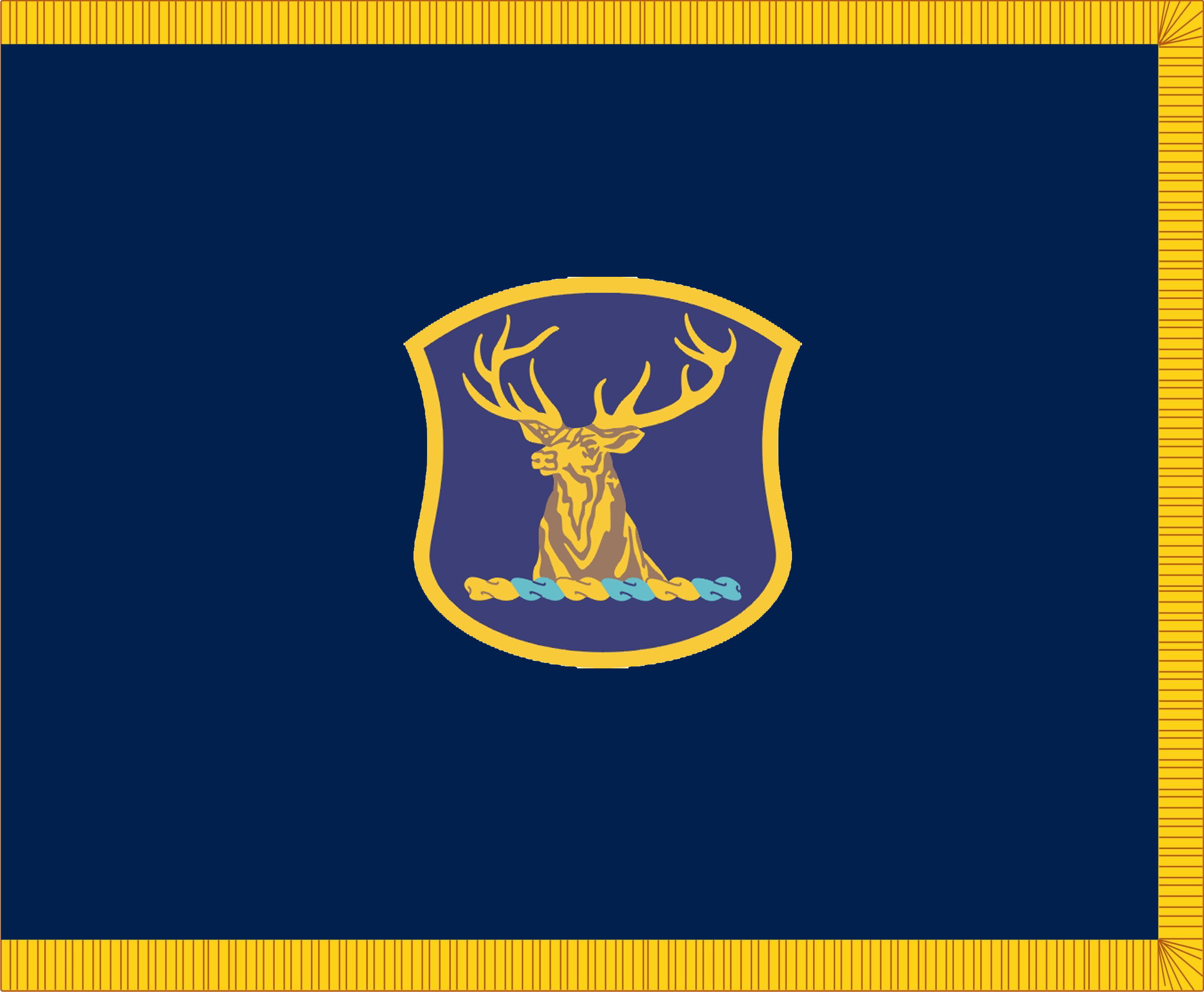
- Idaho ARNG Headquarters Flag

The Idaho Army National Guard is a component of the United States Army and the United States National Guard. Nationwide, the Army National Guard comprises approximately one half of the US Army's available combat forces and approximately one third of its support organization. National coordination of various state National Guard units are maintained through the National Guard Bureau.

Idaho Army National Guard units are trained and equipped as part of the United States Army. The same ranks (both enlisted and officer) and insignia are used and National Guardsmen are eligible to receive all United States military awards. The Idaho Guard also bestows a number of state awards for local services rendered in or to the state of Idaho.

The Militia Act of 1903 organized the various state militias into the present National Guard system.

Formerly attached to the Idaho National Guard NGB regulations 10-4 and United States code chapter 32 section 109 was the Idaho State Guard which was created to replace the Idaho National Guard when they were in federal service and not available for the protection of the state.

== History ==
Soldiers from the Idaho National Guard have been deployed to Afghanistan.

In late November 2020, the Idaho National Guard have helped with COVID-19 screening and testing services, during a third wave of coronavirus infection. The Idaho National Guard has also helped to administrate nearly 100,000 COVID-19 vaccines.

== Organization ==
As of February 2026 the Idaho Army National Guard consists of the following units:

- Joint Force Headquarters-Idaho, Army Element, at Gowen Field
  - Headquarters and Headquarters Detachment, Joint Force Headquarters-Idaho, Army Element, in Boise
  - Idaho Recruiting & Retention Battalion, in Boise
  - Idaho Medical Detachment, in Boise
  - 25th Army Band, at Gowen Field
  - 101st Civil Support Team (WMD), in Boise
  - Orchard Combat Training Center, in Boise
  - Army Aviation Support Facility #1, at Gowen Field
  - Combined Support Maintenance Shop #1, at Gowen Field
  - Maneuver Area Training Equipment Site #1, at the Orchard Combat Training Center
  - Field Maintenance Shop #1, in Lewiston
  - Field Maintenance Shop #5, in Pocatello
  - 116th Cavalry Brigade Combat Team, at Gowen Field
    - Headquarters and Headquarters Company, 116th Cavalry Brigade Combat Team, at Gowen Field
    - 1st Squadron, 221st Cavalry Regiment, in North Las Vegas (NV) — (Nevada Army National Guard)
    - 2nd Battalion, 116th Cavalry Regiment, in Caldwell
      - Headquarters and Headquarters Company, 2nd Battalion, 116th Cavalry Regiment, in Caldwell
      - Company A (Tank), 2nd Battalion, 116th Cavalry Regiment, in Nampa
      - Company B (Tank), 2nd Battalion, 116th Cavalry Regiment, in Nampa
      - Company C (Mechanized Infantry), 2nd Battalion, 116th Cavalry Regiment, in Emmett
    - 3rd Battalion, 116th Cavalry Regiment, in La Grande (OR) — (Oregon Army National Guard)
    - 1st Battalion, 163rd Cavalry Regiment, in Belgrade (MT) — (Montana Army National Guard)
    - 1st Battalion, 148th Field Artillery Regiment, in Pocatello
      - Headquarters and Headquarters Battery, 1st Battalion, 148th Field Artillery Regiment, in Pocatello
      - Battery A, 1st Battalion, 148th Field Artillery Regiment, in Blackfoot
        - Detachment 1, Battery A, 1st Battalion, 148th Field Artillery Regiment, in Preston
      - Battery B, 1st Battalion, 148th Field Artillery Regiment, in Rexburg
        - Detachment 1, Battery B, 1st Battalion, 148th Field Artillery Regiment, in St. Anthony
      - Battery C, 1st Battalion, 148th Field Artillery Regiment, in Burley
    - 116th Brigade Engineer Battalion, in Twin Falls
      - Headquarters and Headquarters Company, 116th Brigade Engineer Battalion, in Twin Falls
      - Company A (Combat Engineer), 116th Brigade Engineer Battalion, in Mountain Home
        - Detachment 1, Company A (Combat Engineer), 116th Brigade Engineer Battalion, in Gooding
      - Company B (Engineer Support), 116th Brigade Engineer Battalion, in Moscow
        - Detachment 1, Company B (Engineer Support), 116th Brigade Engineer Battalion, in Grangeville
        - Detachment 2, Company B (Engineer Support), 116th Brigade Engineer Battalion, in Orofino
      - Company C (Signal), 116th Brigade Engineer Battalion, in Boise
      - Company D (Military Intelligence), 116th Brigade Engineer Battalion, in Boise
    - 145th Brigade Support Battalion, in Lewiston
      - Headquarters and Headquarters Company, 145th Brigade Support Battalion, in Lewiston
      - Company A (Distribution), 145th Brigade Support Battalion, in Post Falls
      - Company B (Maintenance), 145th Brigade Support Battalion, in Post Falls
      - Company C (Medical), 145th Brigade Support Battalion, at Gowen Field
      - Company D (Forward Support), 145th Brigade Support Battalion, in North Las Vegas (NV) — attached to 1st Squadron, 221st Cavalry Regiment (Nevada Army National Guard)
      - Company E (Forward Support), 145th Brigade Support Battalion, in Jerome — attached to 116th Brigade Engineer Battalion
      - Company F (Forward Support), 145th Brigade Support Battalion, in Idaho Falls — attached to 1st Battalion, 148th Field Artillery Regiment
      - Company G (Forward Support), 145th Brigade Support Battalion, at Gowen Field — attached to 2nd Battalion, 116th Cavalry Regiment
        - Detachment 1, Company G (Forward Support), 145th Brigade Support Battalion, in Rigby
      - Company H (Forward Support), 145th Brigade Support Battalion, in Baker City (OR) — attached to 3rd Battalion, 116th Cavalry Regiment (Oregon Army National Guard)
      - Company I (Forward Support), 145th Brigade Support Battalion, at Fort William Henry Harrison (MT) — attached to 1st Battalion, 163rd Infantry Regiment (Montana Army National Guard)
  - State Aviation Group, at Gowen Field
    - 1st Battalion (Assault), 183rd Aviation Regiment, at Gowen Field (part of 34th Combat Aviation Brigade)
      - Headquarters and Headquarters Company, 1st Battalion (Assault), 183rd Aviation Regiment, at Gowen Field
        - Detachment 1, Headquarters and Headquarters Company, 1st Battalion (Assault), 183rd Aviation Regiment, at General Lyman Field (HI) — (Hawaii Army National Guard)
      - Company A, 1st Battalion (Assault), 183rd Aviation Regiment, at Gowen Field (UH-60M Black Hawk)
      - Company B, 1st Battalion (Assault), 183rd Aviation Regiment, at Gowen Field (UH-60M Black Hawk)
      - Company C, 1st Battalion (Assault), 183rd Aviation Regiment, at General Lyman Field (HI) (UH-60M Black Hawk) — (Hawaii Army National Guard)
      - Company D (AVUM), 1st Battalion (Assault), 183rd Aviation Regiment, at Gowen Field
        - Detachment 1, Company D (AVUM), 1st Battalion (Assault), 183rd Aviation Regiment, at General Lyman Field (HI) — (Hawaii Army National Guard)
      - Company E (Forward Support), 1st Battalion (Assault), 183rd Aviation Regiment, at Gowen Field
        - Detachment 1, Company E (Forward Support), 1st Battalion (Assault), 183rd Aviation Regiment, at General Lyman Field (HI) — (Hawaii Army National Guard)
    - Detachment 1, Company G (MEDEVAC), 1st Battalion (General Support Aviation), 168th Aviation Regiment, at Gowen Field (HH-60M Black Hawk)
      - Detachment 1, Headquarters and Headquarters Company, 1st Battalion (General Support Aviation), 168th Aviation Regiment, at Gowen Field
      - Detachment 1, Company D (AVUM), 1st Battalion (General Support Aviation), 168th Aviation Regiment, at Gowen Field
      - Detachment 1, Company E (Forward Support), 1st Battalion (General Support Aviation), 168th Aviation Regiment, at Gowen Field
    - Detachment 1, Company C, 3rd Battalion (Security & Support), 140th Aviation Regiment, at Gowen Field (UH-72A Lakota)
    - Detachment 2, Company D (MEDEVAC), 3rd Battalion (Security & Support), 112th Aviation Regiment, at Gowen Field (UH-72A Lakota)
    - Detachment 3, Company C, 2nd Battalion (Fixed Wing), 245th Aviation Regiment (Detachment 35, Operational Support Airlift Activity), at Gowen Field (C-12 Huron)
    - Detachment 2, Company B (AVIM), 640th Aviation Support Battalion, at Gowen Field
  - 204th Regiment, Regional Training Institute, in Boise
    - 1st Battalion (Armor Training)
    - 2nd Battalion (Modular Training)
    - Regional Training Site-Maintenance & Ordnance Training Battalion

Aviation unit abbreviations: MEDEVAC — Medical evacuation; AVUM — Aviation Unit Maintenance; AVIM — Aviation Intermediate Maintenance

== In popular culture ==
The "Divided We Fall" trilogy by Trent Reedy is written about a member of the Idaho Army National Guard during a Second American Civil War.

The book "Against All Enemies" by Harold Coyle centers around the Idaho National Guard.

== See also ==
- Idaho State Guard
