= 25th Army Band =

Military band unit

The 25th Army Band is a military band unit of the Idaho Army National Guard.

The band was originally organized in the fall of 1925 as the Band Section, Headquarters 116th Cavalry Brigade Combat Team, the largest formation of the Idaho Army National Guard, and was located in Caldwell, Idaho. The band was activated for a period of five years during World War II and served in France. In 1954, the 25th Army Band was again activated for federal service and stationed at Camp Kilmer, New Jersey. They played a weekly radio show, which aired for ten years. The band returned to Caldwell, Idaho, in 1956 and resumed National Guard status. In 1988, the band moved to Gowen Field, Boise, Idaho, where it is currently based and performs regularly in the Boise Valley.

Members are traditional Guard soldiers that live throughout Idaho. Their primary mission is to provide musical support to the members of the Guard, the citizens of Idaho and the United States or as overseas missions require. The band performs primarily in Idaho.

== Notable events ==
- During the summer of 1993, the 25th Army Band traveled to perform in France for Annual Training. The band spent three days in Paris playing at the U. S. Residency for Ambassador Pamela Harriman’s official installation. More than 5,000 dignitaries and celebrities representing 70 nations attended the event. Notable guests included Lauren Bacall, Joan Collins and the son of Charles de Gaulle. The remaining eight days were spent in Southern France performing concerts, receptions and parades on the Riviera.
- During the summer of 1994, the Band traveled to Costa Rica for twelve days to play at the Ambassador’s Residency for a 4th of July celebration for over 5,000 Americans and their dependents residing in San Jose and the surrounding area. During that evening, the band played for a formal diplomatic reception.
- In June 2002, the 25th Army Band traveled to Calgary, Alberta and Edmonton, Alberta, Canada. Performances were played at the Calgary Stampede and at the Station Forces base, (Canadian Army.)
- In August 2005, the Band performed for President George W. Bush for his first visit to Idaho.
- In October 2005, the band was deployed with 400+ Soldiers & Airmen of the Idaho National Guard to help the victims of hurricanes Katrina and Rita. This marked the first time in its history that the band was deployed for something other than music.

== Commander ==
The 25th Army Band is commanded by CW3 Shad Frazier.

== Awards ==
The 25th Army Band has been awarded three unit citations. In 1983 the Band was awarded the State of Idaho Meritorious Unit Award for superior mission performance. In 1988, the band was awarded the Adjutant General’s Outstanding Unit Award for exceptional meritorious and superior performance. This award was presented a second time to the band in 1994.

== Ensembles ==
The 25th Army Band comprises different musical segments; the concert band, jazz band, marching band and many small combo groups.

- Large Group Ensembles: traditional military music ensembles formed from the union of several music performance teams
- Ceremonial Band: an ensemble of 30+ members playing traditional Army ceremonial and concert music.
- Marching Band
- Music Performance Teams: Specialized music support teams playing styles varying from rock and roll to classic quintet music
- The Regulators - Rock Band: a popular music ensemble performing covers of rock, country, pop, blues and funk music.
- All Brass No Ammo - a brass group
- Woodwind Group: Saxophone and traditional woodwind group playing both unique arrangements of popular music as well as traditional tunes.
