= Camp Greene =

US Army facility in Charlotte, North Carolina

Coordinates: 35°13′30.9″N 80°52′56.2″W

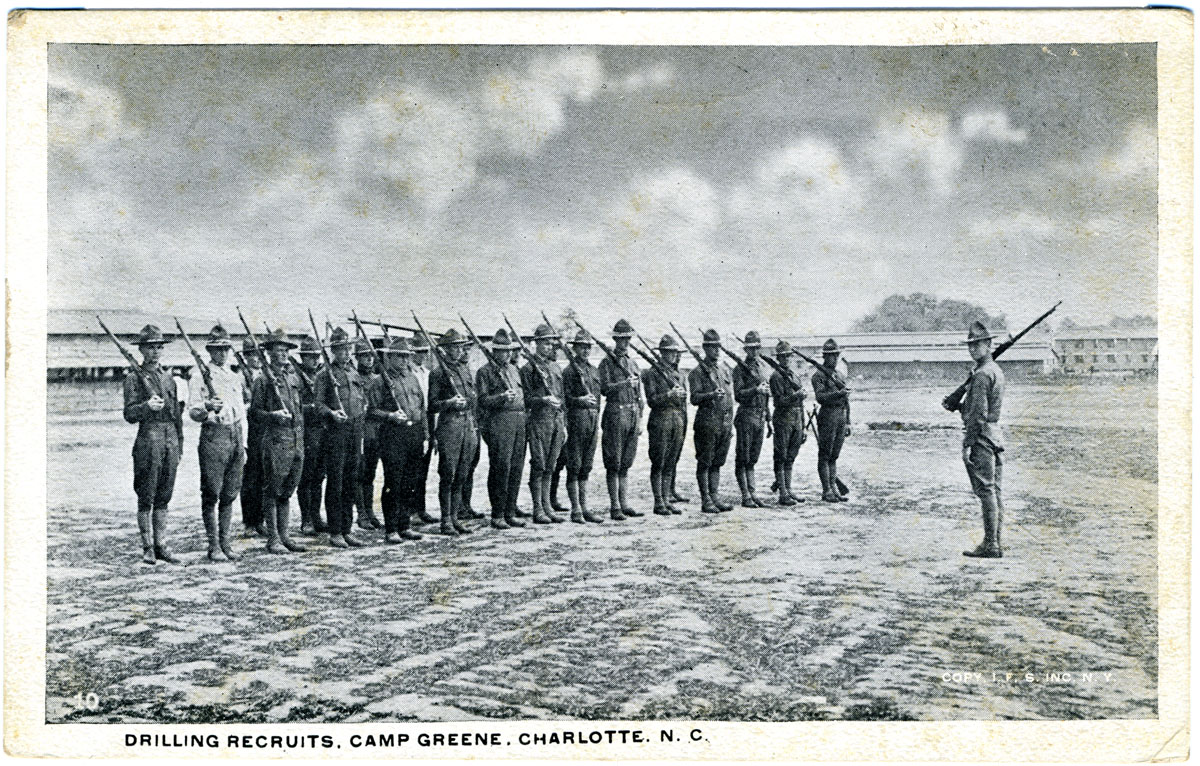
Drilling Recruits, Camp Greene, c. 1917

Camp Greene was a United States Army facility in Charlotte, North Carolina, United States, during the early 20th century. In 1917, both the 3rd Infantry Division and the 4th Infantry Division were first organized and assembled at this camp.

== History ==
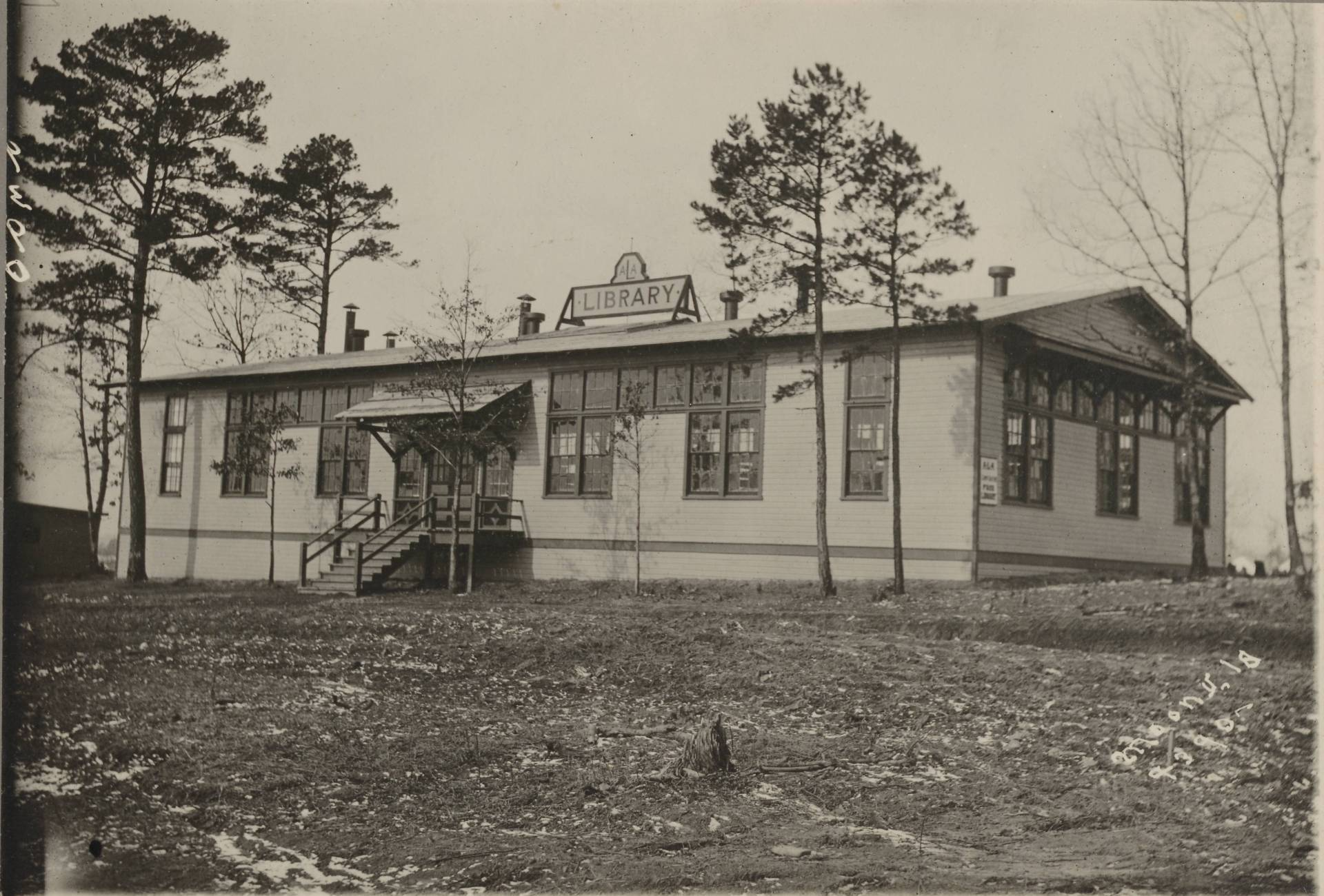
Library War Service camp library at Camp Greene

Named Camp Greene, after the Revolutionary War hero, Nathanael Greene, the camp was established at Charlotte, North Carolina, in 1917. At that time, the population of Charlotte was approaching its 1920 total of 46,000, and so was roughly equivalent to the 40,000 soldiers who trained at Camp Greene.

People who were stationed at Camp Greene included musical conductor Howard Barlow.

== See also ==
- 148th Field Artillery Regiment (United States)
