= 148th Field Artillery Regiment =

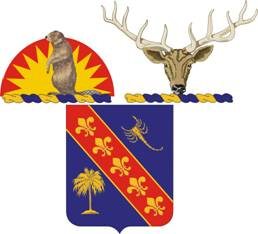
- Coat of arms
- Active: 1877
- Country: United States
- Allegiance: Idaho
- Branch: Idaho Army National Guard, (originally). (Oregon Army National Guard (Secondary)
- Type: Field artillery
- Motto: WHENEVER WHEREVER

Insignia
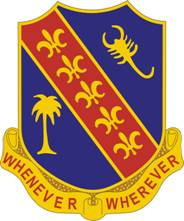
- Distinctive unit insignia

The 148th Field Artillery Regiment is a Field Artillery Branch regiment of the Army National Guard.

== History ==
=== World War I ===
The 148th Field Artillery was organized on 29 September 1917 by General Order 2, Headquarters 41st Division at Greene, North Carolina under the command of Colonel Joseph V. Cavender. The 148th Field Artillery was composed of elements of the 3rd Regiment Wyoming National Guard, the 1st Separate Battalion, Colorado Field Artillery, and 1st Separate Troop, Oregon Cavalry. The regiment was organized as a part of the 66th Field Artillery Brigade, 41st Infantry Division (United States). The regiment trained at Camp Greene, North Carolina, Camp Mills, New York, and Camp Merritt, New Jersey. The regiment sailed from New York to France on 23 January 1918 aboard the RMS Baltic of the White Star Line. The regiment arrived in LA Havre France on 10 February 1918. They were equipped with French 155mm GPF Guns and 50 hp Renault tractors at Camp de Souge near Bordeaux. After training at Camp de Souge and the heavy artillery training center at Libourne the regiment entrained for the front on 4 July 1918. They emplaced directly south of Chateau-Thierry and commenced firing on 9 July 1918. The 148th Field Artillery participated in the Battle of Chateau-Thierry, Champagne-Marne Defensive, Aisne-Marne Offensive, St. Mihiel Offensive, Meuse-Argonne Offensive firing a total of 67,590 rounds of ammunition. After the armistice they served in the Army of Occupation in Germany. On 3 June 1919, the regiment departed St.Nazaire, France on abroad the USS Peerless bound for New York. The 148th Field Artillery Regiment was disbanded on 19 June 1919 at Camp Mills, New York. Unit members from Oregon and Washington were demobilized at Camp Lewis, Washington, while those from Wyoming and Colorado were demobilized at Fort D.A. Russell, Wyoming.

=== Interwar period ===
The 148th Field Artillery was constituted in the National Guard in 1921, assigned to the 41st Division, and allotted to the states of Washington and Idaho. The regimental headquarters, Headquarters Battery, and 2nd Battalion were allotted to Washington and the 1st Battalion was allotted to Idaho. The 1st Battalion was organized and federally recognized on 15 May 1926 with headquarters at Coeur d’Alene, Idaho. The regimental headquarters was organized and federally recognized on 6 May 1927 at Tacoma, Washington. The 2nd Battalion was organized and federally recognized on 5 November 1930 with headquarters at Tacoma. The regiment converted from horse-drawn to tractor-drawn on 15 April 1931. The Washington elements conducted summer training most years at Camp Murray, and Idaho elements at Boise Barracks. The regimental headquarters was withdrawn from Washington on 23 July 1934 and allotted to Idaho, and concurrently organized at Coeur d’Alene. The regiment converted from tractor-drawn to truck-drawn on 1 January 1935. It was inducted into federal service on 16 September 1940 at home stations. It arrived 23 September 1940 at Camp Murray, Washington and moved on 20 March 1941 to Fort Lewis, Washington. Ordered to the Pacific, the 1st Battalion embarked on USAT Willard A. Holbrook 22 November 1941 at the San Francisco Port of Embarkation for the Philippines as part of the Pensacola Convoy.

=== World War II ===
Learning of the Japanese attack on Pearl Harbor while at sea, the convoy was diverted to Australia, and the Holbrook arrived at Brisbane on 22 December. After reloading, the Holbrook departed with the regiment on 28 December in a failed attempt to make the Philippines to reinforce forces there getting no further than Darwin where the regiment was broken up. One battalion and the headquarters unit were ordered to defend Kupang, Timor sailing in convoy 15 February from Darwin aboard Portmar and Tulagi but had to turn back to Darwin under heavy air attack. The convoy arrived Darwin on 18 February, the day before the port was heavily bombed and many ships lost.

=== Global War on Terror ===
- Currently Direct Support Artillery for the 116th Cavalry Brigade Combat Team, Idaho Army National Guard.
- Headquarters Headquarters Battery - Pocatello, Idaho
- Battery A - Blackfoot, Idaho
  - Detachment 1 Battery A - Preston, Idaho
- Battery B - Rexburg, Idaho
  - Detachment 1 Battery B - St. Anthony, Idaho
- Battery C - Boise (Gowen Airfield), Idaho

== Lineage and honors ==
=== Lineage ===
- Organized 1 September 1989 from new and existing units in the Idaho, Nevada, and Oregon Army National Guard as the 148th Field Artillery, a parent regiment under the United States Army Regimental System, to consist of the 1st Battalion, an element of the 116th Cavalry Brigade.
- Reorganized 1 June 1993 in the Idaho and Oregon Army National Guard to consist of the 1st Battalion, an element of the 116th Cavalry Brigade.
- Reorganized 1 December 1996 in the Idaho, Oregon, and Utah Army National Guard to consist of the 1st Battalion, an element of the 116th Cavalry Brigade.

=== Campaign participation credit ===
Headquarters Battery (Pocatello, Idaho), 1st Battalion, entitled to:

- World War II (EAME): Normandy, Northern France, Rhineland, Ardennes-Alsace, Central Europe,
- World War II (AP): Papua, New Guinea (with arrowhead), Luzon, Southern Philippines

Battery A (Blackfoot, Idaho), 1st Battalion, entitled to:

- World War II (AP): New Guinea, Luzon (with arrowhead), Southern Philippines

Battery B (Logan, Utah), 1st Battalion, entitled to:

- World War II (AP): Bismarck Archipelago, Luzon (with arrowhead), Southern Philippines
- Korean War: First UN Counteroffensive; CCF Spring Offensive; UN Summer–Fall Offensive; Second Korean Winter; UN Summer–Fall 1952; Third Korean Winter; Korea, Summer 1953

Battery C (Boise, Idaho), 1st Battalion, entitled to:

- World War II (EAME): Normandy; Northern France; Rhineland; Ardennes-Alsace; Central Europe
- Korean War: First UN Counteroffensive; CCF Spring Offensive; UN Summer–Fall Offensive; Second Korean Winter; Korea, Summer–Fall 1952; Third Korean Winter; Korea, Summer 1953
- Vietnam: Counteroffensive, Phase V; Counteroffensive, Phase VI; Tet 69/Counteroffensive; Summer–Fall 1969

Service Battery (Idaho Falls, Idaho), 1st Battalion, entitled to:

- World War II: Papua New Guinea (with arrowhead); Luzon (with arrowhead); Southern Philippines
- Korean War: First UN Counteroffensive; CCF Spring Offensive; UN Summer–Fall Offensive; Second Korean Winter; Korea, Summer–Fall 1952; Third Korean Winter; Korea, Summer 1953
- Vietnam: Counteroffensive, Phase V; Counteroffensive, Phase VI; Tet 69/Counteroffensive; Summer–Fall 1969

=== Unofficial lineage ===
This lineage is not the official lineage published by the U.S. Army Center for Military History, and is not referenced. However, it is interesting historical information so I left it in the article. Parent unit constituted 19 June 1877 as the 1st Regiment, Idaho Volunteer Militia, Territory of Idaho.

- Organized June–August 1877 from new or existing companies.

Elements in the northern territory (Lewiston and Mt. Idaho companies) withdrawn and with the addition of existing independent companies and new companies, organized 17 September 1877 as the 2nd regiment Idaho Volunteer Militia.

- 1st and 2nd Regiments Idaho Volunteer Militia disbanded 1 March 1879.

1st and 2nd Regiments reconstituted and reorganized 1889–1891 in the Idaho National Guard as the 1st Regiment to include old and new companies over the state (Companies A - F organized or reorganized 1889–1890 in the southern area; Companies G - L organized or reorganized 1891 in the northern area)

- (Organized Militia of Idaho redesignated as Idaho National Guard 14 March 1891)

1st Infantry Regiment mustered into federal service 7–18 May 1898 at Boise as the 1st Idaho Volunteer Infantry. Mustered out 25 September 1899 at the Presidio of San Francisco, California.

- Reorganized and redesignated in 1899 as the 2nd infantry (Companies reorganized over state 1899–1903).

Mustered into federal service 3–6 July at Boise Barracks for Mexican Border duty. Mustered out and reverted to state control 26 January 1917.

- called into federal service 25 March 1917; mustered on 21 September 1917

Regiment broken up, reorganized and redesignated as elements of the 41st Infantry Division as follows:

- 1st Battalion redesignated 1 October 1917 as the 146th Field Artillery Regiment (United States)
- 2nd Battalion redesignated 12 November 1917 as the 2nd Battalion, 116th Engineers
- 3rd Battalion redesignated 5 October 1917 as the 146th Machine Gun Battalion.

Elements demobilized in 1919 as follows:

- 1st Battalion, 146th Field Artillery, on 26 June 1919 at Fort D. A. Russell, Wyoming.
- 2nd Battalion, 116th Engineers, on 1 March 1919 at Camp Dix, New jersey.
- 146th Machine gun Battalion, on 3 April 1919 at Camp Funston, Kansas.

Northern elements organized in the Idaho National Guard as 1st Battalion 148th Field Artillery and federally recognized 15 March 1926 with headquarters at Coeur d'Alene assigned to the 41st Infantry Division 3 January 1930.

- Inducted into federal service 16 September 1940 at Boise

1st Battalion reorganized and redesignated as the 148th Field Artillery Battalion and assigned to 41st Infantry Division, 17 July 1942 Inactivated 17 January 1946 in Japan. (205th Field Artillery Battalion consolidated with 148th Field Artillery battalion 3 July 1946)

- Reorganized and federally recognized 18 April 1947 with headquarters at Coeur d'Alene.

Ordered into active federal service 1 May 1951 at Coeur d'Alene (148th Field Artillery Battalion (NGUS) organized and federally recognized 3 August 1953 with headquarters at Lewiston) Released from active federal service and reverted to state control, 18 March 1955; concurrently, federal recognition withdrawn from 148th Field Artillery Battalion (NGUS) Reorganized and redesignated 15 March 1956 as the 148th Armored Field Artillery Battalion.

- Reorganized and redesignated 1 July 1959 as 148th Artillery
- Redesignated in 1989 as the 148th Field Artillery Battalion
- 1991 Battery C withdrawn from Oregon and assigned to Rexburg, Idaho.
- 1991 Battery B and Det 3 HQ 148 (fire support) assigned to the Utah National Guard
- 1998 National Training Center Rotation 07-98
- 1999 Converts to M109A6 Paladins
- 2002 Battery A deploys to Hill Air Force Base
- 2004–2005 HQ Battery, Battery B (UTARNG), Battery C, and Service Battery deployed to Iraq, Kirkuk region, in support of OIF III

Awarded the Meritorious Unit Commendation for efforts in support of OIF III, Battery C

- 2006 Reorganized as 1st Battalion 148th Field Artillery Regiment 116th Cavalry Brigade Combat Team

Battery B withdrawn from Utah. Battery C (Rexburg, Idaho) disbanded and re-designated Battery B. Fire support elements and teams assigned to 1-163rd INF (MTARNG) 2/116 ARS (IDARNG) and 3-116 AR (ORARNG). 1-148th FAR reorganized as a 2x8 fires battalion.

- 2010 HQ Battery, Battery A, Battery B, and Company G (145 BSB) deploy to Iraq in support of Operation New Dawn
- 2015 1-148th FAR re-organized as 3x6 Battalion. Battery C un-cases guidon in Burley, Idaho (Moved to Boise, Idaho 2026)

== Distinctive unit insignia ==
- Description

A Gold color metal and enamel device 1 1/16 inches (2.7 cm) in height overall consisting of a shield blazoned: Azure, on a bend Gules fimbriated Or between a scorpion bendwise and a palm tree on a mount five fleurs-de-lis, all of the like. Attached below the shield a Gold scroll inscribed "WHENEVER WHEREVER" in Red.

- Symbolism

The shield is blue to recognize the organization's 1898 Infantry heritage. The palm tree symbolizes the service as Infantry in the Philippines and the scorpion the service as Infantry on the Mexican border. The five fleurs-de-lis on the red bend represent the five engagements as Field Artillery in France during World War I.

- Background

The distinctive unit insignia was originally approved for the 148th Field Artillery Regiment, Washington and Idaho National Guard on 20 May 1929. It was redesignated for the 148th Field Artillery Battalion on 2 March 1943. It was redesignated for the 148th Artillery Regiment, Idaho National Guard on 29 July 1960. The insignia was redesignated effective 1 September 1989, for the 148th Field Artillery Regiment, Oregon and Idaho Army National Guard and amended to revise the description and symbolism.

== Coat of arms ==
- Blazon
  - Shield: Azure, on a bend Gules fimbriated Or between a scorpion bendwise and a palm tree on a mount five fleurs-de-lis, all of the like.
  - Crest: On wreaths of the colors Or and Azure, the Army National Guard crests of Oregon and Idaho in the order in which the states were admitted to the Union: OREGON: A demi-disc Gules charged with the setting sun with twelve light rays Or (the shoulder sleeve insignia of the 41st Division), behind a beaver sejant Proper. IDAHO: An elk's head caboshed Proper.
  - Motto WHENEVER WHEREVER.
- Symbolism
  - Shield: The shield is blue to recognize the organization's 1898 Infantry heritage. The palm tree symbolizes the service as Infantry in the Philippines and the scorpion the service as Infantry on the Mexican border. The five fleurs-de-lis on the red bend represent the five engagements as Field Artillery in France during World War I.
  - Crest: The crests are that of the Oregon and Idaho Army National Guard.
- Background: The coat of arms was originally approved for the 148th Field Artillery Regiment, Washington and Idaho National Guard on 20 May 1929. It was redesignated for the 148th Field Artillery Battalion and amended to withdraw the crest of the Washington National Guard on 2 March 1943. It was redesignated for the 148th Artillery Regiment, Idaho National Guard on 29 July 1960. The insignia was redesignated effective 1 September 1989, for the 148th Field Artillery Regiment, Oregon and Idaho Army National Guard and amended to add the crest of the Oregon Army National Guard and revise the symbolism.

== Campaign credits ==
- War with Spain
  - Manila
- Philippine Insurrection
  - Manila
  - Laguna de Bay
- World War I
  - Champagne-Marne
  - Aisne-Marne
  - St. Mihiel
  - Meuse-Argonne
  - Champagne 1918
- World War II
  - East Indies
  - New Guinea (with arrowhead)
  - Bismark Archipelago (with arrowhead)
  - Luzon (with arrowhead)
  - Leyte
  - Southern Philippines (with arrowhead)
- Iraq
  - Iraqi Freedom 2004–2005, IRAQI GOVERNANCE—29 JUN 2004 TO 15 DEC 2005
  - Operation New Dawn 2010–2011, November 2010 to September 2011

== Decorations ==
- Philippine Presidential Unit Citation, Streamer embroidered 17 OCTOBER 1944 to 4 July 1945: HQ Battery (Pocatello Idaho), Battery A (Blackfoot Idaho)
- Meritorious Unit Citation, Streamer embroidered Nov 2004 to November 2005, Iraqi Freedom III: HQ Battery (Pocatello Idaho), Battery B (Smithfield/Logan UTARNG), Battery C (Rexburg Idaho), SVC Battery (Idaho Falls Idaho)
