= List of Adjutants General of Nevada =

The Adjutant General of Nevada is the senior officer of the Nevada National Guard overseeing command of more than 4,000 Nevada Army and Air National Guard personnel and responsible for both the federal and state missions of the Nevada National Guard. The adjutant general is appointed by the governor of Nevada.

== History ==
The position of adjutant general in Nevada was created following the state's Organic Act in 1861. In accordance with federal law, the Territorial Legislature defined the "enrolled" militia as "every free, able-bodied white male inhabitant...between the ages of eighteen and forty-five years" except those exempted by law. Similar legislation was established following Nevada's entrance into statehood in 1864. Under Nevada law, the adjutant general serves as the senior military officer. Throughout the state's first century, though, the obligations were ex-officio positions of other offices, including lieutenant governor and secretary of state. In 1948, the Nevada National Guard re-organized after it federalized for service in World War II. This new force included both the Nevada Army National Guard and the emergence of the Nevada Air National Guard. In 1967, Nevada changed its militia law to create a full-time adjutant general position in the state. Since 2002, the adjutant general has worked out of the Office of the Adjutant General in Carson City, Nev.

== List of Nevada adjutants general ==
Adjutant General	Date	Information
H.P. Russell	1862–1864	Nevada's Organic Act created Nevada Territory in 1861 and gave the territorial governor power to appoint an adjutant general, who was ex-officio the Governor's chief of staff, quartermaster general, commissary general, inspector general and chief of ordnance. Territorial Gov. James Nye appointed H.P. Russell to the post. Russell lost his post following statehood when the Nevada Senate declined his confirmation as adjutant general in 1865.
John D. Cradlebaugh	1865–1867	John Cradlebaugh was assigned as district judge of western Utah Territory (Carson City) in 1859. In 1861, he became Nevada's first territorial delegate to Congress. Cradlebaugh served as a Union colonel in the Civil War and was seriously wounded at the Battle of Vicksburg. His wounds included a saber cut to the throat, which left him incapacitated. Unable to practice law as a result of the injury, Cradlebaugh received an appointment and was unanimously confirmed in the Nevada Senate as the first Nevada adjutant general following statehood. He died in Eureka, Nevada, in 1872.
Chauncey N. Noteware	1867–1870	A member of Nevada's Constitutional Convention of 1863, Noteware was the first elected adjutant general. In 1866, the Nevada Legislature made the position an additional duty of the secretary of state, a position Noteware held from 1864 to 1870. Noteware also served in the Nevada Senate (Ormsby County). Noteware had no known military record.
James D. Minor	1871–1874	Elected Nevada's secretary of state in 1870, James D. Minor is best known for his activation of the Nevada Militia in 1873 to remove Lt. Gov. Frank Denver from his prison warden duties during the "State Prison War" in Carson City. Lawmakers ousted Denver as lieutenant governor — a position that came with the additional duty of prison warden — and Minor was tasked with removing him. While defiant throughout, Denver left without a fight when the militia set up artillery outside the prison and demanded he surrender.
Jewett W. Adams	1875–1883	Jewett W. Adams was the first of three lawmakers to serve as both adjutant general and eventually as the governor. As adjutant general, Adams saw the expansion of the state militia — then almost entirely located in Storey County — with new units in Eureka, Lincoln and Ormsby counties. He saw the activation of the Nevada militia during the Bannock War in 1878 in northern Nevada and Oregon.
Charles E. Laughton	1883–1886	Charles E. Laughton sought the expansion of the Nevada Guard and consolidation of companies into a brigade. His term included regular pleas for more support and greater standardization of enlistment terms. While Adams is noted referring to the militia as the Nevada National Guard, Laughton is the first adjutant general to use this term on a regular basis, in replace of “militia.”
Henry C. Davis	1887–1889	Henry C. Davis' tenure as adjutant general was best remembered for his procurement of U.S. Army uniforms for Nevada National Guard soldiers. His tenure also coincided with the state's increasing depression following the end of the Comstock boom in Virginia City along with a great degree of political turmoil. Davis was the first adjutant general to die in office in 1889 of a heart attack in his garden in Carson City. The following year, Governor Charles Stevenson, who appointed Davis, also died in office.
Samuel Chubbuck	1889	Samuel Chubbuck, a native of Nova Scotia, was appointed lieutenant governor following Davis' death. He served in the position for two months in 1889 before leaving Nevada for a job as a Wells Fargo freight agent. Chubbuck was a Comstock pioneer and two-term Republican senator from Storey County.
Frank Bell	1889–1890	Frank Bell, a distant cousin of Alexander Graham Bell, served multiple stints as Nevada State Prison warden along with his appointment as lieutenant governor following the resignation of Samuel Chubbuck. Bell also worked in the telegraph business and was the brother-in-law of Senator C.C. Powning, of Reno. Following the death of Governor Charles Stevenson, Bell became Nevada's sixth governor.
Joseph Poujade	1891–1895	Joseph Poujade oversaw the long-awaited re-organization of the Nevada militia into a regimental organization and the Guard's first organized summer encampment. The encampment began Aug. 22, 1892 at Treadway's field in Carson City and included a 3 a.m. surprise attack. During Poujade's tenure, the Nevada Legislature officially changed the name of the state militia to the Nevada National Guard in 1893. That year, the adjutant general became a separate appointed position from the lieutenant governorship.
Charles Henry Galusha	1890, 1895 to 1898	Charles Henry Galusha was the only Nevada adjutant general to serve two non-consecutive terms, including a brief stint in 1890. He was a long-time soldier who entered service in a Michigan volunteer unit during the Civil War before he moved to Carson City in the 1870s. During the ramp up to the Spanish–American War, Galusha eventually left his post for hospital in Oakland as a lung infection worsened. The illness would take his life and he died July 21, 1898.
George W. Cowing	1898	George W. Cowing, appointed following the death of Adjutant General Charles Henry Galusha, served as adjutant general for five months in 1898. However, it was during a frantic time for the Guard as it mobilized volunteer units for the Spanish–American War. Many of the volunteer soldiers eventually departed overseas and served in the Philippine Insurrection of 1899.
James R. Judge	1898–1903	James R. Judge, an engineer and lawyer, served as adjutant general in a great time of transition for the Guard. State legislation in 1899 fixed peacetime Guard strength at one battalion of no more than five companies and returned the adjutant generalship to the lieutenant governor. Additionally, Congress passed the Militia Act of 1903 and enacted federal standards for Guard units. When Judge left office in 1903 he lobbied for funding for what he called the poor conditions of the Carson City armory. The state legislature did not deliver on funding.
Lemuel Allen	1903–1906	Lemuel Allen, a Silver Democrat of Churchill County, was a long-time Nevada politician, serving in the Assembly in 1877 and as Speaker of the Assembly before being elected lieutenant governor in 1902. He warned that if more funds weren't allotted, "it will not be many years until it (Nevada) will have no armed militia." Following the Militia Act of 1903, Allen's prophesy came true in 1906 and Nevada lost its federal recognition. This was due in large part to the anti-militia sentiment among labor unions in the mines who feared militia activation for strong-armed, strike-breaking tactics.
Denver Dickerson	1907–1911	Denver Dickerson served as adjutant general during perhaps the darkest hour of the Nevada National Guard. Dickerson, a veteran of the Spanish–American War, was elected lieutenant governor in 1906. He became governor in 1908 following the death of Governor John Sparks. Dickerson maintained the position of adjutant general during this time — with no federally recognized Guard or even state militia.
Gilbert C. Ross	1911–1915	Gilbert C. Ross, elected lieutenant governor in 1910, led the re-emergence of the Nevada State Militia. On July 29, 1912, the hopes of many Nevada citizens came to fruition with the formation of three companies of infantry. However, these forces did not meet federal inspection standards and remained without federal recognition. Even without federal funds, though, Nevadans organized and trained.
Maurice J. Sullivan	1915–1926	Maurice J. Sullivan, Nevada's longest serving lieutenant governor and eventual U.S. congressman, repeatedly sought re-organization of the Nevada National Guard, but was continually denied funding by the state Legislature. In 1916, the War Department requested Nevada create two units of cavalry to combat the Pancho Villa raids in New Mexico. The request was denied as Nevada failed recruitment marks. He did organize the production of Nevada's Gold Stars, a book dedicated to Nevadans killed serving in World War I.
Jay H. White Jay H. White	1927–1947	Jay H. White, the longest-serving adjutant general in Nevada history, spearheaded the re-organization of the Nevada National Guard. In 1925, the adjutant general position returned as a private secretary to the governor. White developed an unprecedented degree of respectability to the office and achieved federal recognition for the Nevada National Guard in 1927. He also served as adjutant general during World War II as Nevada Guard units federalized. Additionally, White wrote a history of the Nevada National Guard and the state militia during his tenure.
Marlowe Merrick Marlowe M. Merrick	1947	Marlowe M. Merrick's tenure as adjutant general was purposely brief. Merrick, a cavalry officer in World War I under Gen. John Pershing, became a pilot and eventually commanded the Stead Army Air Base at the end of World War II. After stepping down from command, Merrick sought permanent residence in northern Nevada. In 1947, Governor Vail Pittman asked Merrick if he would help with the Guard's re-activation, given his connections in the War Department. Upon the activation of the 192nd Fighter Squadron, Nevada Air National Guard, Merrick resigned after only two months as adjutant general.
James A. May James A. May	1947–1966	James A. May, an instrumental leader in the Nevada National Guard's transition into the post-World War II era, spearheaded efforts for the Nevada Air Guard's move to its current base at the Reno Airport. The base is unofficially named after May, the Nevada National Guard's second-longest tenured adjutant general. He served as adjutant general during the Nevada Air Guard's 22-month deployment during the Korean War, the re-organization of the Army Guard and during a considerable build-up of armories around the state.
Addison Millard Addison A. Millard	1967	Addison A. Millard was only adjutant general for five months, but his tenure occurred during the Guard's revision of militia laws at the Legislative Session in Carson City in 1967. Millard led efforts for a new Military Code of Justice and the formation of the Nevada Military Department. Additionally, the adjutant general position became a full-time state position, separate from director of selective service, supervising and administering local draft boards. Millard maintained his position as director of selective service and resigned as adjutant general following the legislative session that year.
Floyd Edsall Floyd L. Edsall	1967–1979	Floyd L. Edsall was Nevada's first full-time adjutant general following the Nevada National Guard's revision of its militia laws in 1967. A World War II veteran and Silver Star recipient as a member of the 63rd Infantry Division, Edsall oversaw the Nevada Guard's transition into the post-Vietnam War Era and an all-volunteer force, along with the Nevada Air Guard's acquisition of F-4 aircraft. In 1997, the Nevada Army Guard's 1,697-acre training facility in North Las Vegas was dedicated as the Maj. Gen. Floyd Edsall Training Center to recognize Edsall's contributions to the Nevada Guard.
William F. Engel William F. Engel	1979–1983	William F. Engel, a graduate of Reno High and the University of Nevada, Reno, served as an executive assistant in the Nevada Highway Department before his appointment to adjutant general in 1979. He also served as the state's director of selective service and was an active volunteer in the community. During his tenure as adjutant general, Engel survived injuries suffered during a commercial airline flight crash landing while on his way to visit soldiers training at Camp Ripley, Minn.
Robert J. Dwyer Robert J. Dwyer	1983–1986	Robert J. Dwyer, an accomplished Vietnam War combat pilot, was adjutant general as the Nevada Guard ratcheted up its manning levels in the 1980s. Dwyer, awarded the Distinguished Flying Cross for his service in Vietnam, had more than 5,500 flight hours and was rated in numerous aircraft before becoming adjutant general.
Drennan Clark Drennan A. Clark	1986–2001	Drennan A. Clark, a prominent attorney in Reno before becoming adjutant general, entered the Nevada Air National Guard in 1960. After commissioning in 1964, he activated during the Pueblo Crisis in Korea. He was the third-longest serving adjutant general in Nevada history. The Order of Nevada Service Ribbon, given to members with more than 25 years of exceptional service, is named in his honor. During Clark's tenure, the Nevada Guard began its first state partnership — then called the "partnership for peace program" — with Turkmenistan in 1996. He also oversaw the Nevada Air National Guard's transition from F-4 to C-130 aircraft in 1995.
Giles Vanderhoof Giles E. Vanderhoof	2001–2005	Giles E. Vanderhoof oversaw an unprecedented increase in the demands on the Nevada Military Department following the terrorist attacks of 9/11. At times during Vanderhoof's tenure, the Nevada Air and Army Guard hit overseas deployment percentages as high as 23 and 49 percent of the entire force, respectively. That ranked among the highest percentages of any state National Guard in the nation. Vanderhoof also oversaw the opening of the new Office of the Adjutant General in Carson City, Nev., in 2002, and the consolidation of the state's Joint Force Headquarters in 2003.
Cynthia Kirkland Cynthia N. Kirkland	2005–2009	Cynthia N. Kirkland, the Nevada National Guard's first female adjutant general, managed continuous operation tempo and overseas deployments during her tenure. Additionally, as she entered the position, the Nevada Air National Guard faced potentially losing its entire C-130 fleet in 2005 under Base Realignment and Closure (BRAC). Following a robust campaign and community effort to stop the closure, the Department of Defense decided to not close the base, which effectively saved the Nevada Air National Guard.
William Burks William R. Burks	2009–2019	William R. Burks, a veteran of Operation Desert Shield/Storm, served in the 152nd Reconnaissance Group, Nevada Air National Guard, and in the Pentagon as the Director of Staff, Headquarters Air Force Quadrennial Defense Review. Burks' tenure as adjutant general has included unprecedented facility growth and improved infrastructure with the construction of the North Las Vegas Readiness Center, a new maintenance shop in Las Vegas and the Guard's acquisition of the training facility in Carlin. Additionally, the Nevada National Guard signed a Declaration of Partnership with the Kingdom of Tonga in 2014 and has developed several other partnerships in the Pacific under the National Guard Bureau's State Partnership Program.
Ondra Berry Ondra L. Berry	2019–present	Ondra L. Berry, a former Reno police officer, was appointed by Governor Steve Sisolak.
