= 221st Cavalry Regiment =

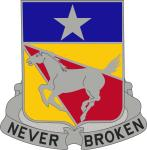
- Active: 1980–present
- Country: United States
- Allegiance: Nevada
- Branch: Nevada Army National Guard
- Garrison/HQ: Las Vegas, NV
- Nickname: "Wild Horse"
- Motto: "Never Broken"
- Engagements: Spanish American War World War II: Ryukyus Campaign; Global war on terrorism: Afghanistan; Expeditionary

Commanders
- Squadron Commander: LTC Michael J. Moya
- Command Sergeant Major: CSM Cameron Anderson

The 221st Cavalry Regiment, Nevada Army National Guard, is a parent regiment under the U.S. Army Regimental System, with headquarters in Las Vegas, Nevada. It currently consists of 1st Squadron, 221st Cavalry Regiment a 600-soldier Armored Reconnaissance Squadron of the Nevada Army National Guard located in southern Nevada. For command and control purposes within the Nevada Army National Guard, 1st Squadron, 221st Cavalry Regiment, is a subordinate unit to the Land Component Commander (LCC) of the Nevada Army National Guard. In 2016, the squadron entered into an alignment-for-training relationship with the 116th Cavalry Brigade Combat Team, 34th Infantry Division. In May 2016, the squadron donned the Shoulder Sleeve Insignia of the 116th Cavalry Brigade Combat Team. As an armored reconnaissance squadron, the 1st Squadron, 221st Cavalry Regiment, is able to deploy three mechanized cavalry troops, one armor company, a support company, a headquarters troop, and a squadron headquarters in order to accomplish its federal, state, and community missions.

== Introduction ==
=== Current Units ===
- 1st Squadron, 221st Cavalry Regiment, in North Las Vegas
  - Headquarters and Headquarters Troop, 1st Squadron, 221st Cavalry Regiment, in North Las Vegas
  - Troop A (Reconnaissance), in North Las Vegas
  - Troop B (Reconnaissance), in North Las Vegas
  - Troop C (Reconnaissance), in North Las Vegas
  - Company D (Armor), in North Las Vegas
  - Company D (Forward Support), 145th Brigade Support Battalion, in North Las Vegas
  - Detachment 4, 1st Battalion, 148th Field Artillery Regiment, in North Las Vegas

=== Mission, Training, and Capabilities ===
In support of their federal mission, soldiers of the squadron train as members of M2A3 Bradley infantry fighting vehicle crews, as reconnaissance platoons, and M1A1 Abrams main battle tank crews. Additionally, the squadron has a 120-mm M120 heavy mortar platoon, a fire support platoon, a medical platoon, a signal section, a sniper squad, and a unit ministry team.

When training in a traditional National Guard status, the squadron will typically complete Bradley Fighting Vehicle gunnery tables, or dismounted reconnaissance training, and tank gunnery tables, lanes. The squadron has also conducted successful training cycles providing training and validation to prepare other Nevada Army National Guard units for deployment to the middle east. Additionally, the squadron incorporates elements of stability operations, support operations, and counterinsurgency operations into larger training events.

== World War II ==
The 2nd Battalion, 115th Engineers, an element of the 40th Division was constituted on November 3, 1928, in the Nevada National Guard and federally recognized on May 1, 1936, with Headquarters in Reno. By January 1, 1941, the unit was converted and re-designated as the 121st Separate Coast Artillery Battalion and relieved from assignment to the 40th Division. Upon the US entry into World War II, the battalion was ordered into Federal Service and on June 25, 1942, the battalion would drop the "Separate" moniker as a federal unit. It would not be until September 10 of 1943 that the 121st was reorganized into a Antiaircraft Artillery Gun Battalion and deploy in the Pacific Theatre. As continual improvements in technology progressed through the war, the unit would be reorganized as the 1st Rocket Battalion on January 4, 1945, and re-designated as the 421st Rocket Field Artillery Battalion on April 13 of that year while participating in the Ryukyus Campaign. Upon the end of the war, the 421st would be deactivated on January 15, 1946, at Ft Lawton, Washington.

== Postwar era ==
As the dust settled from World War II, the units of the Nevada National Guard would begin to re-organize and become federally recognized. It was on January 23, 1948, that the 421st Antiaircraft Artillery Gun Battalion was federally recognized and headquartered in Las Vegas. Upon the conclusion of the Korean War, there was a triggering of unit change across the Army. With the changing times, the battalion would be re-organized as the 421st Antiaircraft Artillery Automatic Weapons Battalion on December 1st 1952. Throughout the 1950s manning across Nevada would fluctuate and unit needs changed. So on April 1, 1959, the 421st Antiaircraft Artillery, 422nd Antiaircraft Artillery and the 226th Antiaircraft artillery detachment would be merged into the newly formed 221st Artillery.

=== 221st Artillery ===
The 221st Artillery, a parent regiment under the Combat Arms Regimental System, was composed of 1st Gun Battalion, 2nd Gun Battalion, and 3rd Gun Detachment. This would be the first designation of the unit as the 221st.

With the increasing cold war tensions and impending conflict in Southeast Asia, the Regiment was reorganized as an Automatic weapons regiment on June 1, 1962. After the reorganization the regiment would maintain the same structure of 2 battalions and 1 detachment until November 1965 where the outbreak of the Vietnam war would see the consolidation of the regiment to 1st Automatic weapons battalion and the 3rd Detachment.

==== Return of the Cavalry ====
With the ongoing force structure changes of the Vietnam war, the regiment would mount up in December 1967 as 3rd Squadron, 116th Armored Cavalry Regiment with Headquarters in Reno, NV. By May 1974 the unit was relocated back to Las Vegas as the 3rd Squadron 163rd Armored Cavalry Regiment.

==== The Armor Regiment ====
With the Vietnam war over, and the Army looking to add armor force restructure, the Regiment was reorganized and renamed as the 221st Armor Regiment on April 1, 1980. The new regiment would consist of the 1st Battalion, 221st Armor and was assigned as an element of the 40th Infantry Division. In 1989 the Combat Arms Regimental System was withdrawn and the unit was reorganized under the newly formed U.S. Army Regimental System.

==== OPFOR era 1995-2007 ====
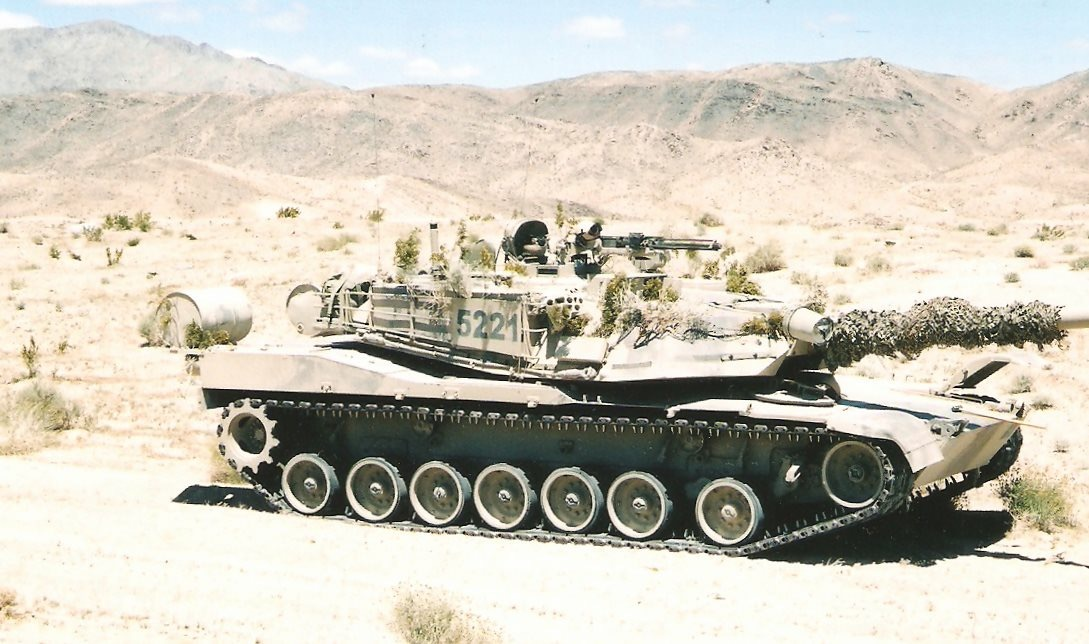
1-221 CAV OPFOR M1A1 KVT

In 1995 the armored Battalion was realigned as a round out Squadron of the 11th Armored Cavalry Regiment (11th ACR) where they would fight alongside their active duty counterparts in NTC rotations. This would normally involve rotational support for one rotation per year (Squadron level), or 3-4 rotations per year (Troop level). During this time the Squadron was designatied the 60th Guards Independent Tank Brigade (60th GITB) and was habitually employed as an exploitation force during Regimental (DTG) operations. In the OPFOR role the Squadron tanks were operated in VISMOD mode. This included removal of the ballistic skirts, application of the tan-brown "Mongodai" pain scheme, two 55 gal fuel drums affixed to the hull, and other minor visual changes. The tanks combat capabilities remained fully functional during this time, and the tanks regularly completed Tank Gunnery Training (up to individual crew qualification - TTVIII) to maintain basic crew proficiency. .

Post-OPFOR transition

In 2007 the Cavalry Squadron would trade in its Abrams tanks for scout variant Bradley Fighting vehicles and reorganize as the Armored Reconnaissance squadron of the 11th ACR.

== Global war on terrorism to present ==
In 2001 the squadron was part of the 11th Armored Cavalry Regiment. After the events of September 11th 2001, elements of the squadron would be called to active service for security missions at Nellis Air force Base, McCarran International Airport, and other key pieces of infrastructure under Operation Noble Eagle.

Mobilization in support of OPFOR mission at Fort Irwin CA, 2004-2006

The entire squadron would be mobilized under the command of LTC Johnny H. Isaak (CSM Robert Brown), from June 2004 until April 2006, serving as OPFOR at Fort Irwin National Training Center while 1st Squadron, 11th ACR and 2nd Squadron, 11th ACR deployed in support of Operation Iraqi Freedom. This deployment allowed the NTC to continue to operate as a training facility during the deployment of the 11th Armored Cavalry Regiment. During their activation the squadron would participate in over 15 rotations, successfully preparing over 50,000 soldiers from the US Army, US Navy Seals, Army Special forces and Marine Corps for deployment to the middle east. The squadron also participated in the first "Expeditionary" rotation executed by NTC, when it deployed (with Operations Group) to Fort Carson Colorado DEC 2005-FEB 2006, and conducted three rotations vs the 3rd Armored Cavalry Regiment under COL H. R. McMaster.

=== Afghanistan ===
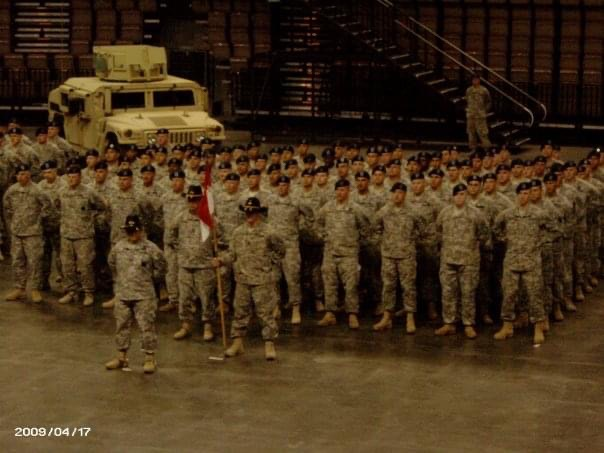
K Troop (Kilo) 1-221 CAV mobilization, Apr 2009

In DEC 2008 the Squadron was alerted for mobilization and deployment to Afghanistan in support of Operation Enduring Freedom. Pre mobilization training was conducted in January at Camp Roberts CA. The squadron mobilized in April and conducted post mobilization training at Camp Atterbury Indiana. In May 2009 the Squadron deployed to Afghanistan.

The Squadron provided 12 Security Force Platoons (SECFOR) to the US Provincial Reconstruction Teams (PRT), while the Squadron HQ and bulk of the Squadron was assigned as the Coalition force responsible for Laghman Province battlespace. In this AOR they occupied FOB Mehtar Lam, with combat outposts at Xio Haq (south) and Nagil (north). The Squadron operated as part of 4th Bde, 4th Infantry Division commanded by COL Randy George, partnering with its ANSAF, ANP, Afghan Government, US military, and multi-national partners.

The Squadron conducted combat operations throughout Afghanistan until April 2010, when it redeployed and demobilized. This deployment included troopers primarily from Nevada, augmented by troopers from Guam, Arizona, Arkansas, and numerous volunteers from across the nation. Ultimately 752 Wildhorse troopers deployed, with 48 earning the Purple Heart for combat wounds. No troopers were lost.

Realignment with 116th Heavy Brigade Combat Team

In 2016 the squadron would leave the 11th ACR and realign as the reconnaissance squadron for the 116th Cavalry Brigade Combat Team, a National Guard Brigade out of Boise, ID.

=== Expeditionary ===
In November 2021, the Squadron's tank company, Delta "Die Hard" was activated in support of Operation Enduring Freedom (Spartan Shield) based out of Kuwait.

== Civil Support Missions ==
Throughout its history, the squadron has been often called on to support local civil authorities in everything from New Year's Eve events on the Las Vegas Strip, to pandemic response, and more.

=== COVID-19 ===
In May 2020, Soldiers from the squadron were mobilized as part of the state's COVID-19 response. These Soldiers supported local hospitals, food banks, homeless shelters and eventually vaccination sites as part of the Nevada COVID response Joint Task Force.

==== 2021 Presidential Inauguration ====
In the wake of the January 6th United States Capitol attack, the squadron would be activated to service for Operation Capitol Response in support of the 59th Presidential Inauguration in Washington D.C.

== Unit Awards & Decorations ==
The Squadron's awards include the prestigious Goodrich Riding Trophy, the Governor’s Outstanding Unit Award, “Top Gunnery Battalion” of the 40th Infantry Division (Mechanized), National Guard Bureau Superior Unit Award, the Eisenhower Trophy, and the Meritorious Unit Commendation for service in Afghanistan.
