= Nevada National Guard =

U.S. National Guard component for the state of Nevada

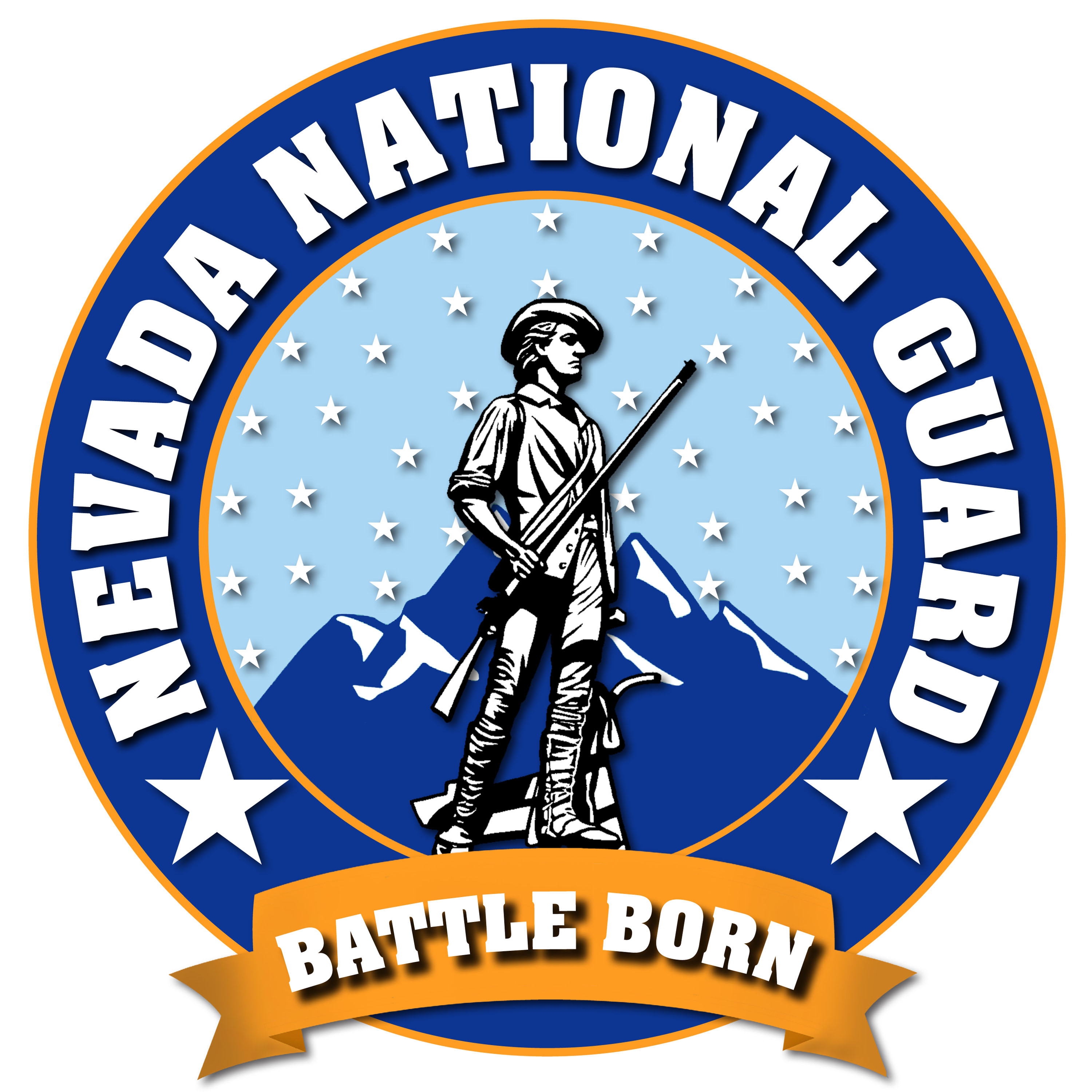
- Seal of the Nevada National Guard
- Active: 1862–present
- Country: United States
- Allegiance: United States; Nevada
- Branch: United States Army; United States Air Force
- Type: National Guard
- Role: Militia
- Size: 4,256 personnel
- Part of: Nevada Military Department; United States National Guard Bureau
- Headquarters: 2460 Fairview Drive, Carson City, Nevada 89701
- March: Silver State Fanfare
- Website: Official website

Commanders
- Commander in Chief (Title 10 USC): President of the United States (If Federalized)
- Commander in Chief (Title 32 USC): Governor of Nevada

The Nevada National Guard is the component of the United States National Guard in Nevada. The governor of Nevada may call individuals or units of the Nevada National Guard into state service. The Constitution of the United States charges the national guard of each state to support its dual federal and state missions.

As of 2024, the guard had a total force of about 4,443 uniformed personnel with around 3,336 soldiers and about 1,106 airmen. About 80 percent of its guardsmen participate in military training one weekend a month and 15 days each year in their respective military occupations and career fields. Full-time employees stationed throughout the state 455 technicians and 563 active-duty guardsmen.

The Nevada National Guard includes armories and facilities in eight of the state's 16 counties and state capital with 16 primary facilities. In addition to soldiers stationed at headquarters, the Nevada Army Guard includes the 17th Sustainment Brigade, the 991st Aviation Troop Command and the Recruiting and Retention Battalion. The Nevada Air Guard is composed of the 152nd Airlift Wing and 152nd Intelligence Squadron in Reno and the 232nd Operations Squadron in Indian Springs.

The governor is the commander-in-chief of the Nevada National Guard and appoints the adjutant general. Since October 2024, the adjutant general has been Brig. Gen. D. Roger Waters, appointed by Governor Joe Lombardo.

== History ==
English and American militia tradition provided the blueprint for the origins of Nevada's state militia, eventually called the National Guard. This tradition served the patriot cause in the American Revolution. After the war, the 1792 Militia Act, under the new Constitution, provided for the president to call out state militias during invasion or emergency but failed to establish a national militia system, as many Federalists sought. During the antebellum period, compulsory military training of state militias was not enforced and almost completely ceased. In their place came volunteer and fraternal-like organizations that practiced marksmanship along with drills and ceremonies.

In Nevada, the same occurred in response to strained Native American relations and fear of secessionists before and during the Civil War. In the winter of 1859–60, the discovery of the Comstock Lode brought a “Rush to Washoe” that increased friction with the Native population in what was then still far-western Utah Territory. A loosely organized militia attacked Pyramid Lake Paiutes in retaliation for perceived crimes against white settlers. Ambushed by the Paiutes on their march to Pyramid Lake, the militia met disaster, with 76 killed. Union regulars and citizen militias from California mining towns quickly responded, defeating and dispersing the Paiutes by June 1860. In July, the War Department began construction of Fort Churchill and other federal posts in Nevada to maintain peace and protect the Overland Trail.

=== 1880s to World War II ===
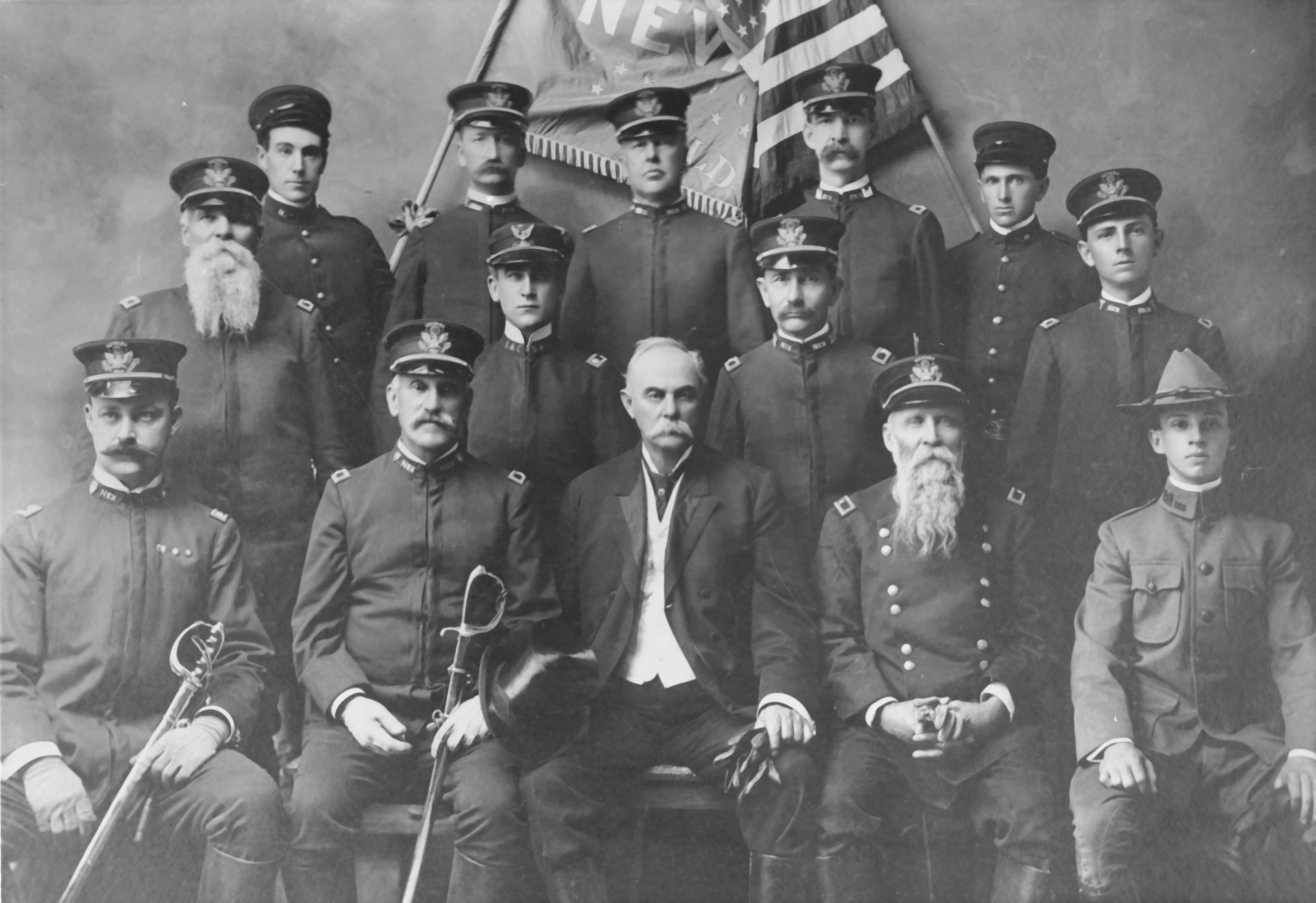
This 1906 photo shows Nevada Gov. John Sparks, center, with the Nevada Guard's command staff posing for a photo during Labor Day. The Nevada National Guard's units disbanded in May of that year largely because pro-union sentiment in Nevada viewed the Guard as an arm of the state against workers.

From 1880 to 1900, the Comstock mines dried up and the Silver State's population plummeted. During this time, the Nevada Guard struggled to meet national standards suggested by larger states. Still, in 1892, with fewer than 50,000 people living in the state — the smallest in the nation by population, but fifth largest in area — Nevada guardsmen held their first summer encampment in Carson City. Volunteer soldiers, many of them miners, came from as far away as Tuscarora in Elko County and Yerington in the Mason Valley. The encampment included rifle practice and a 3 a.m. “sham” attack. Nevada's budget constraints only allowed guardsmen to receive $10 per encampment, compared to $33 per encampment for soldiers in New York. In 1896, Carson City Guard, Company F, earned the national marksmanship championship with Springfield rifles, even though “companies in the eastern States have been prone to deny this” and “did not believe the published records of the Carson Company to be correct.” After President William McKinley called on the states during the Spanish-American War, nearly every Nevada Guard unit disbanded as military men left for war.

In 1906, the final two units of infantry in the Nevada Guard disbanded after a federal inspector questioned their loyalty to the state. According to the federal officer from the Presidio in California: “The replies of both were that not a man could be relied upon to obey the order of the Governor, and I wish to add that in my opinion both captains and all company officers, as well as the enlisted men, would not only refuse to obey orders of the Governor, but would be arrayed on the other side [of labor violence].”

The Nevada Guard's disbandment occurred simultaneously with the rise of labor radicalism, especially in Goldfield, Nevada, the state's population center at the time, which included the Industrial Workers of the World. Even after the fall of Goldfield in the 1910s, labor groups repeatedly blocked the reorganization of the National Guard at the state legislature. Efforts stalled during World War I as most able-bodied men entered conscription instead of the state Guard.

In 1927, Nevada Governor Fred Balzar named Mineral County District Attorney Jay White state adjutant general, with the goal of reorganization. In 1928, the 40th Division established the 40th Military Police Company in Reno with 60 soldiers. White, who enthusiastically embraced his role as adjutant general, remained Nevada's adjutant general even after Balzar's death in 1934. He helped reorganize the Nevada National Guard again after the state force was federalized during World War II. During the war, the Nevada Guard deployed around the world and saw action in the Pacific Theater.

=== Cold War ===
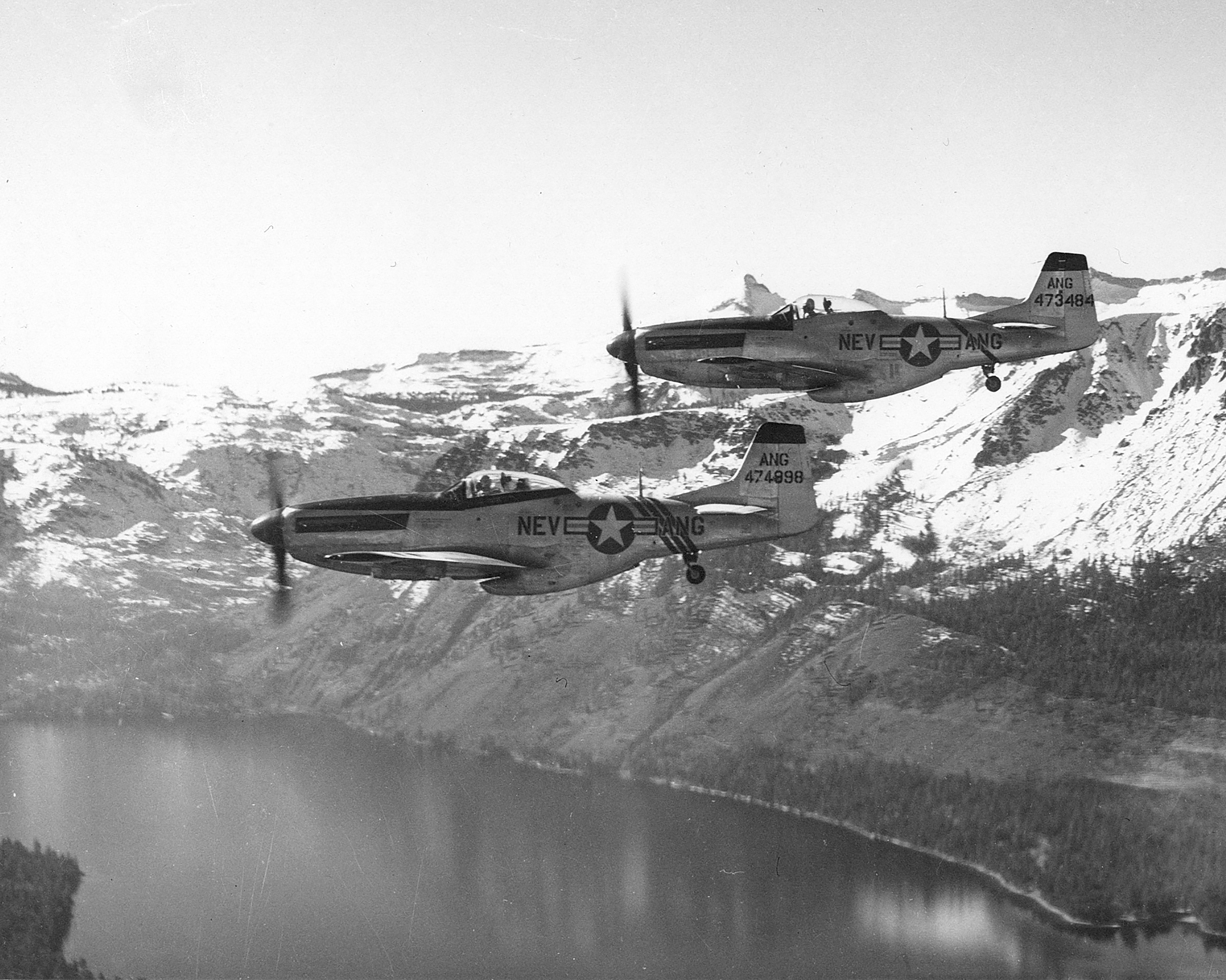
The Nevada Air Guard was created in 1948 when the 192nd Fighter Squadron received federal recognition flying P-51 Mustang aircraft.

As the Iron Curtain fell across Eastern Europe with the beginning of the Cold War, and a hot war occurred in Korea (1950–53), major federal funds poured into the state for the reorganization of the Nevada National Guard. In 1948, the Nevada Army Guard reorganized with the 421st Anti-Aircraft Artillery Battalion. With the creation of the U.S. Air Force in 1947, Nevada received an Air National Guard unit with the 192nd Fighter Squadron, established in 1948. The 192nd operated out of the old Army Air Base north of Reno in present-day Stead. In 1951, the 192nd entered a 21-month deployment flying P-51 Mustang aircraft in the Korean War. During the war, the Nevada Air Guard suffered its only combat fatality in its history: Lt. Frank Salazar. After the war, the Nevada Air Guard entered a lease agreement with the city of Reno for land south of the airport, at Hubbard Field, present-day Reno-Tahoe International Airport. The 152nd Airlift Wing remains there today. In the 1950s, the Nevada Air Guard received massive sums of federal support, along with the Nevada Army Guard, for base improvements and the construction of armories. This was also true for other western states, especially California, as the federal government with its burgeoning defense establishments during the Cold War emerged as a major economic multiplier in the growth of the American West during the 20th century.

In 1967, the Nevada legislature re-wrote the state's militia code, which provided for the expansion of the state's military department, including a code of military justice and the creation of a full-time adjutant general position. In 1968, the Nevada Army Guard changed its mission from artillery to armored cavalry, and it also acquired its first helicopter (OH23B), the initial step toward bringing Army aviation assets to the state. Also that year, the Nevada Air Guard answered President Lyndon B. Johnson's call-up in response to North Korea's capture of the USS Pueblo, a naval intelligence vessel. While no direct military retaliation was initiated, more than 600 Nevada air guardsmen were activated on one-day notice for service in South Korea and various places around the United States.

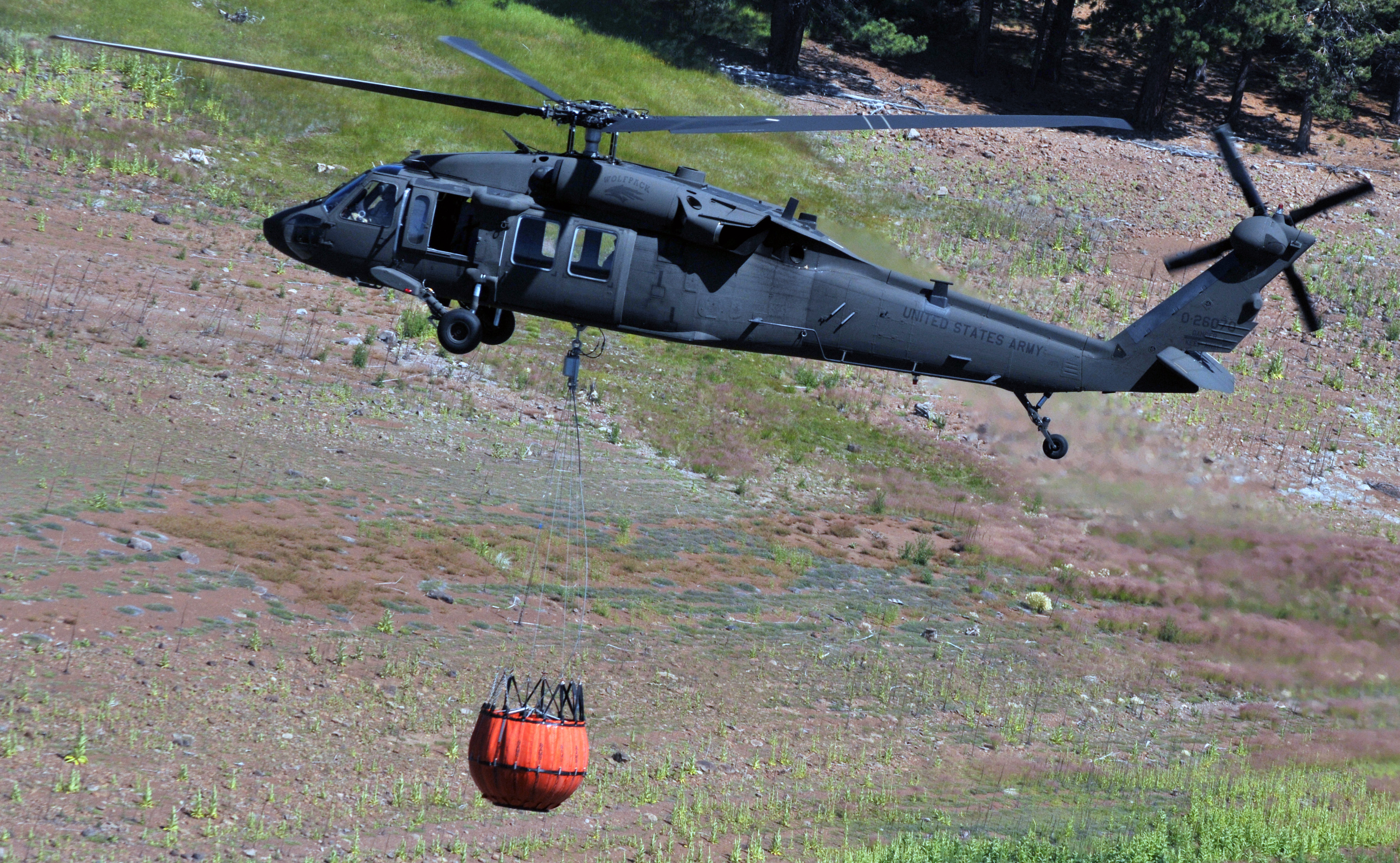
A Nevada Army National Guard UH-60 Blackhawk helicopter operates during a firefighting training in northern California in 2015.

The Nevada Air and Army Guard garnered numerous trophies for excellence in the late 1970s and 1980s. The Nevada Air Guard won the aerial reconnaissance championship, Photo Finish, against international competition in 1978 and Reconnaissance Air Meet championships in 1986 and 1990. Airman Magazine noted the “High Rollers of Reno” are the “best at what they do” — aerial reconnaissance. In 1980, the Nevada Army Guard's 3rd Squadron, 116th Armored Cavalry re-designated as the 1st Squadron, 221st Cavalry. The 221st won two Goodrich Riding Trophies, 1984 and 1986, a highly coveted armor trophy. In 1985, it gained national attention after it completed a 135-mile tank march from southern Nevada to Fort Irwin, California, commonly referred to as the “Death March,” with 71 tracked vehicles and 109 wheeled vehicles. The convoy stretched as long as 25 miles and included 420 soldiers. In 1986, the Nevada Army National Guard gained its first aviation battalion, the 1st Battalion, 113th Aviation, which operated CH-54 Skycranes, eventually receiving UH-60 Blackhawks and CH-47 Chinooks in the 1990s.

=== Total Force Concept ===
After the Vietnam War and the draft, the Department of Defense adopted its total force concept, using the National Guard of the states more during federal missions. In the 1980s and 1990s, the Nevada Army National Guard expanded with various support missions, assisting the warfighter overseas and citizens at home during natural disaster. Both the Nevada Army and Air Guard deployed units during Operation Desert Storm and Desert Shield. In 1991, the then-152nd Reconnaissance Group was among the first aircrew to fly missions over Kuwait and Iraq. They dodged anti-aircraft artillery, obtained photos of burning wellheads, spotted strategic targets and conducted assessments on the first morning of the war. Thirteen airmen of the unit received the Distinguished Flying Cross. Additionally, the 72nd Military Police deployed to Saudi Arabia where they operated and maintained prisoner of war camps. In 1995, the U.S. Air Force moved away from crewed reconnaissance, and the 152nd re-designated as the 152nd Airlift Wing operating C-130 aircraft.

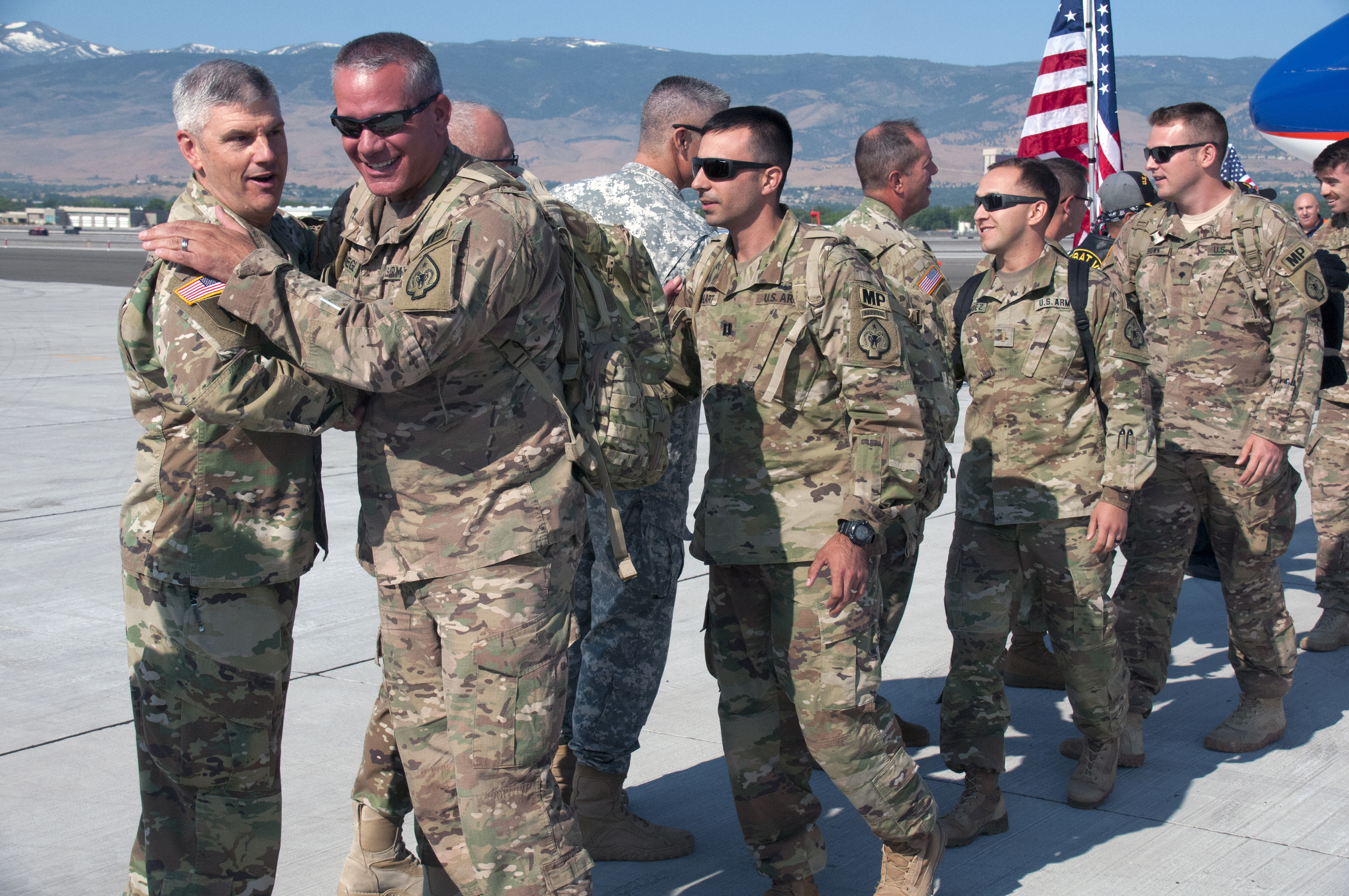
1st Sgt. Elbie Doege, 485th Military Police Company, front right, embraces Col. Eric Wishart during the unit's deployment return from Kuwait July 6, 2017 at Atlantic Aviation in Reno.

In the Post-9/11 Era, the Nevada Air and Army Guard entered an unprecedented operations tempo. This deployment cycle has become the standard for the Nevada National Guard, and it has come with a cost. During the 1864th Transportation Company's deployment to Iraq in 2005, Spc. Anthony Cometa, of Las Vegas, was manning a HMMWV machine gun turret when his vehicle lost control and flipped. One day after his 21st birthday, Cometa died in the accident. Two months after Cometa's death, a rocket-propelled grenade struck the fuel tank of a Chinook helicopter in Afghanistan, killing Chief Warrant Officer 3 John M. Flynn, of Sparks, and Sgt. Patrick D. Stewart, of Fernley. Also killed in the crash were two Oregon Army National guardsman and an active duty soldier. In 2013, the Nevada Guard named the field maintenance complex at the Las Vegas Readiness Center after Cometa. Additionally, a memorial to the five Army aircrew killed stands at the Army Aviation Support Facility in Stead, Nevada.

Additionally, the Nevada Guard's role in emergency response in the U.S. increased. In 2016, the 152nd Airlift Wing was named the newest unit to operate the U.S. Forest Service's Modular Airborne Fire Fighting System, or MAFFS. One of four military C-130 units nationwide operating the mission, the 152nd can be called to fight wildland fires around the nation. In 2017, the Nevada Army Guard and Air Guard responded to more domestic response activations than any year in its history, including floods in northern Nevada and support of hurricane response efforts in Texas, Florida and Puerto Rico.

== Organization ==
=== Nevada Army National Guard ===
Nevada Army National Guard
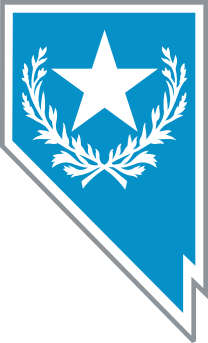
- Nevada Army National Guard STARC SSI
- Active: 1864 - present
- Country: United States
- Allegiance: Nevada
- Branch: United States Army
- Role: United States Army National Guard
- Garrison/HQ: Carson City, Nevada
- Website: https://nv.ng.mil/

Commanders
- Nevada State Adjutant General: BG D. Rodger “Dan” Waters

Insignia
- Nevada Army National Guard Crestie

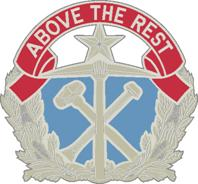
- Nevada Army National Guard STARC DUI

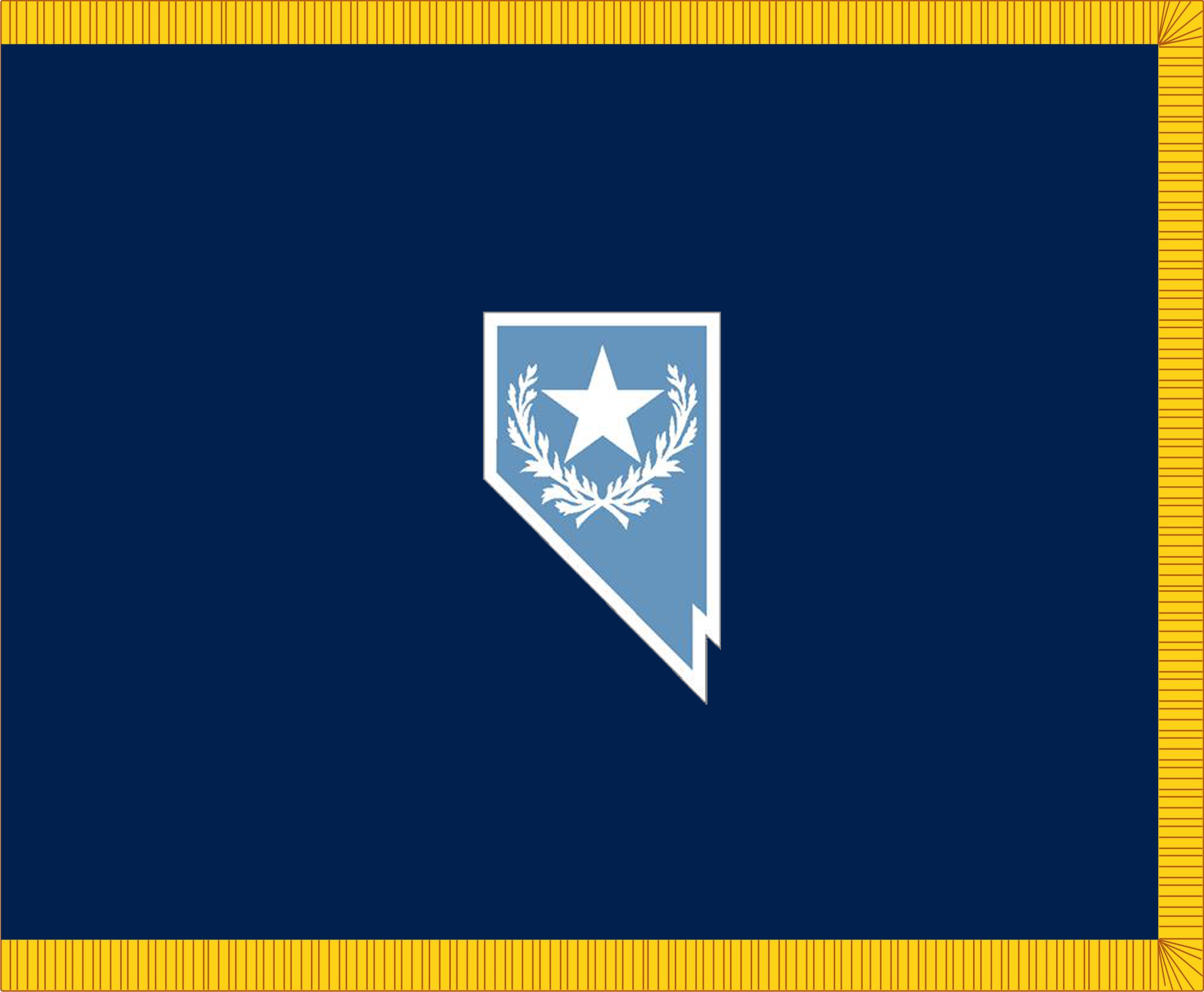
- Nevada Army National Guard Headquarters Flag

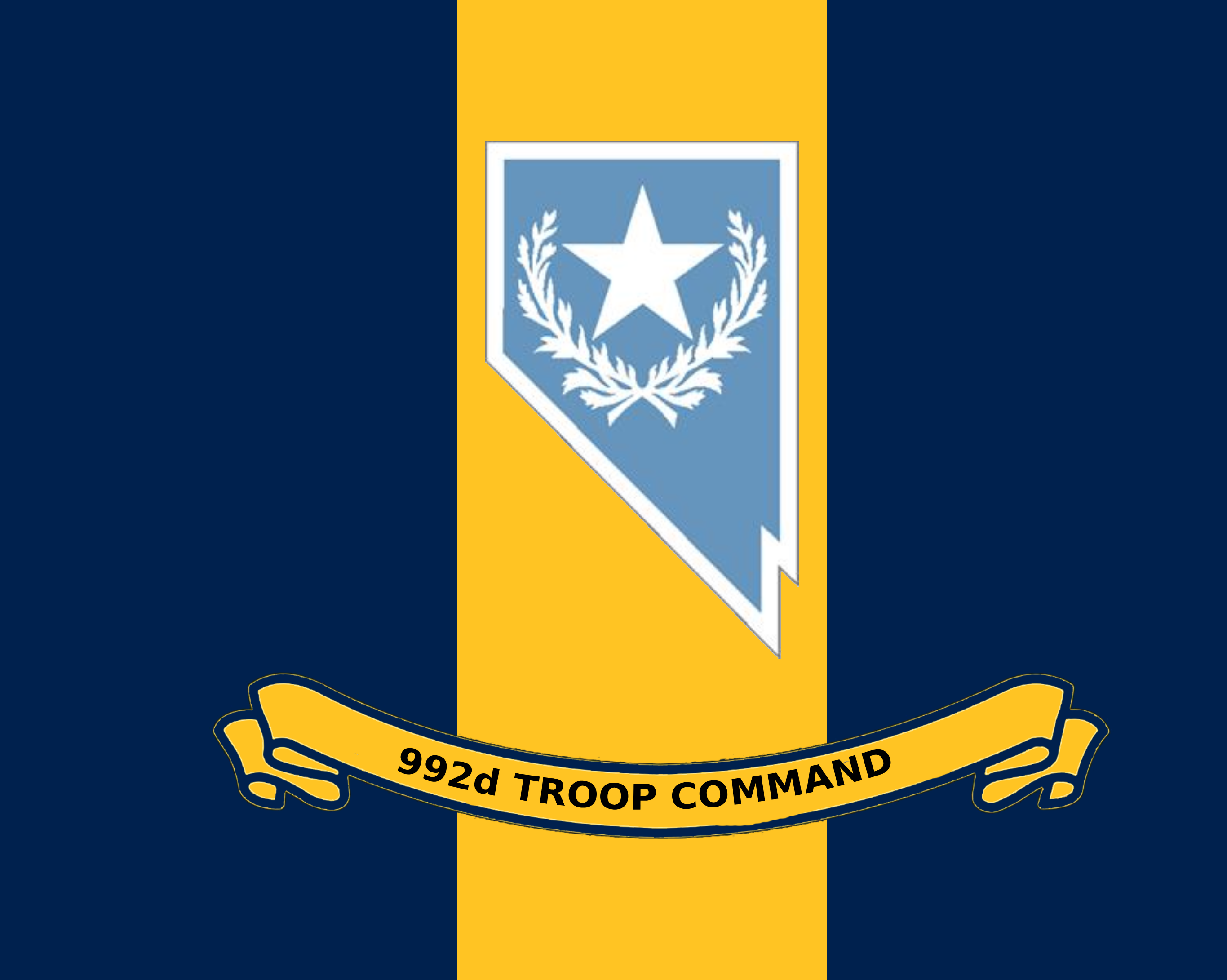
- Nevada Army National Guard 992nd Troop Command Flag

As of January 2026 the Nevada Army National Guard consists of the following units:

- Joint Force Headquarters-Nevada, Army Element, in Carson City
  - Headquarters and Headquarters Company, Joint Force Headquarters-Nevada, Army Element, in Carson City
  - Nevada Medical Detachment, in Reno
    - Medical Platoon North, in Reno
    - Medical Platoon South, in Las Vegas
  - Nevada Recruiting & Retention Battalion, in Carson City
  - 92nd Civil Support Team (WMD), in Las Vegas
  - Army Aviation Support Facility #1, at Reno Stead Airport
  - Army Aviation Support Facility #2, at North Las Vegas Airport
  - Combined Support Maintenance Shop #1, in Carson City
  - Field Maintenance Shop #1, in North Las Vegas
  - Field Maintenance Shop #2, at Reno Stead Airport
  - 17th Sustainment Brigade, in North Las Vegas
    - 17th Special Troops Battalion, in Las Vegas
      - Headquarters and Headquarters Company, 17th Sustainment Brigade, in North Las Vegas
      - 72nd Military Police Company (Combat Support), in Henderson
        Nevada National Guard armory in Henderson, Nevada in 2026. The armory is the base of the 72nd Military Police Company.
      - 100th Quartermaster Company (Water Purification and Distribution), in North Las Vegas
      - 240th Engineer Company (Vertical Construction Company), in North Las Vegas
      - 593rd Transportation Company (Medium Truck) (POL, 5K GAL), in North Las Vegas
      - 777th Engineer Detachment (Concrete Section), in North Las Vegas
      - 1864th Transportation Company (Medium Truck) (PLS), in Las Vegas
      - 3665th Ordnance Company (EOD), in North Las Vegas (part of 741st Ordnance Battalion (EOD))
    - 757th Combat Sustainment Support Battalion, in Reno
      - Headquarters and Headquarters Company, 757th Combat Sustainment Support Battalion, in Reno
        - 121st Quartermaster Platoon (Field Feeding), in Reno
      - 106th Public Affairs Detachment, in Reno
      - 137th Military Police Detachment (Law Enforcement), in Carson City
      - 150th Ordnance Company (Support Maintenance), in Carson City
      - 609th Engineer Company (Mobility Augmentation Company, in Fallon
      - 1859th Transportation Company (Medium Truck) (Cargo), in Reno
  - 1st Squadron, 221st Cavalry Regiment, in North Las Vegas (part of 116th Cavalry Brigade Combat Team)
    - Headquarters and Headquarters Troop, 1st Squadron, 221st Cavalry Regiment, in North Las Vegas
    - Troop A, 1st Squadron, 221st Cavalry Regiment, in North Las Vegas
    - Troop B, 1st Squadron, 221st Cavalry Regiment, in North Las Vegas
    - Troop C, 1st Squadron, 221st Cavalry Regiment, in North Las Vegas
    - Troop D (Tank), 1st Squadron, 221st Cavalry Regiment, in North Las Vegas
    - Company D (Forward Support), 145th Brigade Support Battalion, in North Las Vegas
    - Detachment 4, Headquarters and Headquarters Battery, 1st Battalion, 148th Field Artillery Regiment, in North Las Vegas
  - 422nd Expeditionary Signal Battalion (Enhanced), in Reno
    - Headquarters and Headquarters Company, 422nd Expeditionary Signal Battalion (Enhanced), in Reno
    - Company B, 422nd Expeditionary Signal Battalion (Enhanced), in Las Vegas
    - Company C, 422nd Expeditionary Signal Battalion (Enhanced), in Reno
      - Detachment 1, Company C, 422nd Expeditionary Signal Battalion (Enhanced), in Las Vegas
    - 448th Signal Company (Tactical Installation/Networking), in Casa Grande (AZ) — (Arizona Army National Guard)
  - 991st Aviation Troop Command, at Reno Stead Airport
    - Headquarters and Headquarters Detachment, 991st Aviation Troop Command, at Reno Stead Airport
    - Company B (Heavy Lift), 1st Battalion (General Support Aviation), 189th Aviation Regiment, at Reno Stead Airport (CH-47F Chinook)
      - Detachment 1, Headquarters and Headquarters Company, 1st Battalion (General Support Aviation), 189th Aviation Regiment, at Reno Stead Airport
      - Detachment 1, Company D (AVUM), 1st Battalion (General Support Aviation), 189th Aviation Regiment, at Reno Stead Airport
      - Detachment 1, Company E (Forward Support), 1st Battalion (General Support Aviation), 189th Aviation Regiment, at Reno Stead Airport
    - Detachment 1, Company B, 3rd Battalion (Security & Support), 140th Aviation Regiment, at North Las Vegas Airport (UH-72A Lakota)
    - Detachment 1, Company D (MEDEVAC), 3rd Battalion (Security & Support), 140th Aviation Regiment, at North Las Vegas Airport] (UH-72A Lakota)
    - Detachment 1, Company G (MEDEVAC), 2nd Battalion (General Support Aviation), 238th Aviation Regiment, at Reno Stead Airport (UH-60L Black Hawk)
    - Detachment 3, Company B, 2nd Battalion (Fixed Wing), 641st Aviation Regiment (Detachment 45, Operational Support Airlift Activity), at Reno Stead Airport (C-12 Huron)
  - 421st Regiment, Regional Training Institute, in North Las Vegas

Aviation unit abbreviations: MEDEVAC — Medical evacuation; AVUM — Aviation Unit Maintenance

=== Nevada Air National Guard ===
As of January 2026 the Nevada Air National Guard consists of the following units:

- Joint Force Headquarters-Nevada, Army Element, in Carson City
  - Headquarters and Headquarters Detachment, Joint Force Headquarters-Nevada, Army Element, in Carson City
  - 152nd Airlift Wing, at Reno–Tahoe International Airport
    - 152nd Operations Group
      - 152nd Operations Support Squadron
      - 152nd Intelligence Squadron
      - 192nd Airlift Squadron, with C-130H Hercules
      - 232nd Combat Training Squadron, at Nellis Air Force Base
    - 152nd Maintenance Group
      - 152nd Maintenance Squadron
      - 152nd Aircraft Maintenance Squadron
      - 152nd Maintenance Operations Flight
    - 152nd Mission Support Group
      - 152nd Civil Engineer Squadron
      - 152nd Force Support Squadron
      - 152nd Logistics Readiness Squadron
      - 152nd Security Forces Squadron
      - 152nd Communications Squadron
    - 152nd Medical Group

== Funding ==
Under the direction of two state employees — the governor and the adjutant general — the Nevada Military Department oversees and manages the Nevada National Guard's missions, facilities and training. State of Nevada employees provide administrative, accounting, personnel, firefighting, security, maintenance and custodial support for all facilities assigned to the Nevada Military Department. Not all funds used to pay personnel come from state coffers; in fact, more than 80 percent of personnel expenditures for military department state employees are from federal funds.

== Adjutant general ==
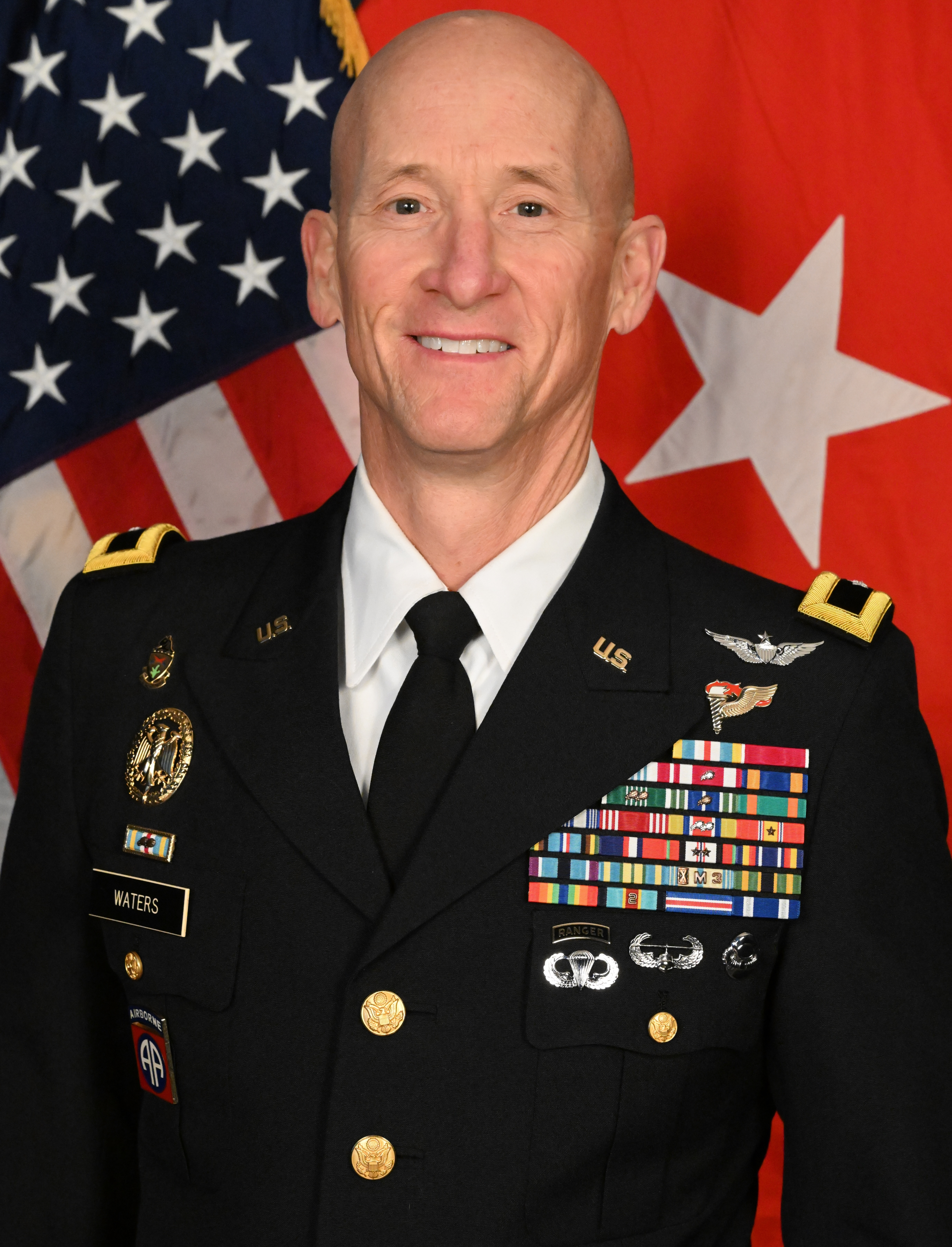
Brig. Gen. D. Roger Waters, Nevada adjutant general.

The adjutant general of Nevada is the senior officer of the Nevada National Guard overseeing command of more than 4,000 Nevada Army and Air National Guard personnel and responsible for both the federal and state missions of the Nevada National Guard. The adjutant general is appointed by the governor of Nevada. The position of adjutant general in Nevada was created following the state's Organic Act in 1861.

In accordance with federal law, the Territorial Legislature defined the "enrolled" militia as "every free, able-bodied white male inhabitant...between the ages of eighteen and forty-five years" except those exempted by law. Similar legislation was established following Nevada's entrance into statehood in 1864. Under Nevada law, the adjutant general serves as the senior military officer. Throughout the state's first century, though, the obligations were ex-officio positions of other offices, including lieutenant governor and secretary of state.

In 1948, the Nevada National Guard re-organized after it federalized for service in World War II. This new force included both the Nevada Army National Guard and the emergence of the Nevada Air National Guard.

In 1967, Nevada changed its militia law to create a full-time adjutant general position in the state. Since 2002, the adjutant general has worked out of the guard's headquarters in Carson City.

== Allison Bailey whistleblowing and wrongful death case ==
American former Sergeant First Class (SFC) Allison Bailey died on March 4, 2023, at age 33, after serving in the Nevada National Guard for 17 years and having been discharged from the Guard six weeks prior to her death.

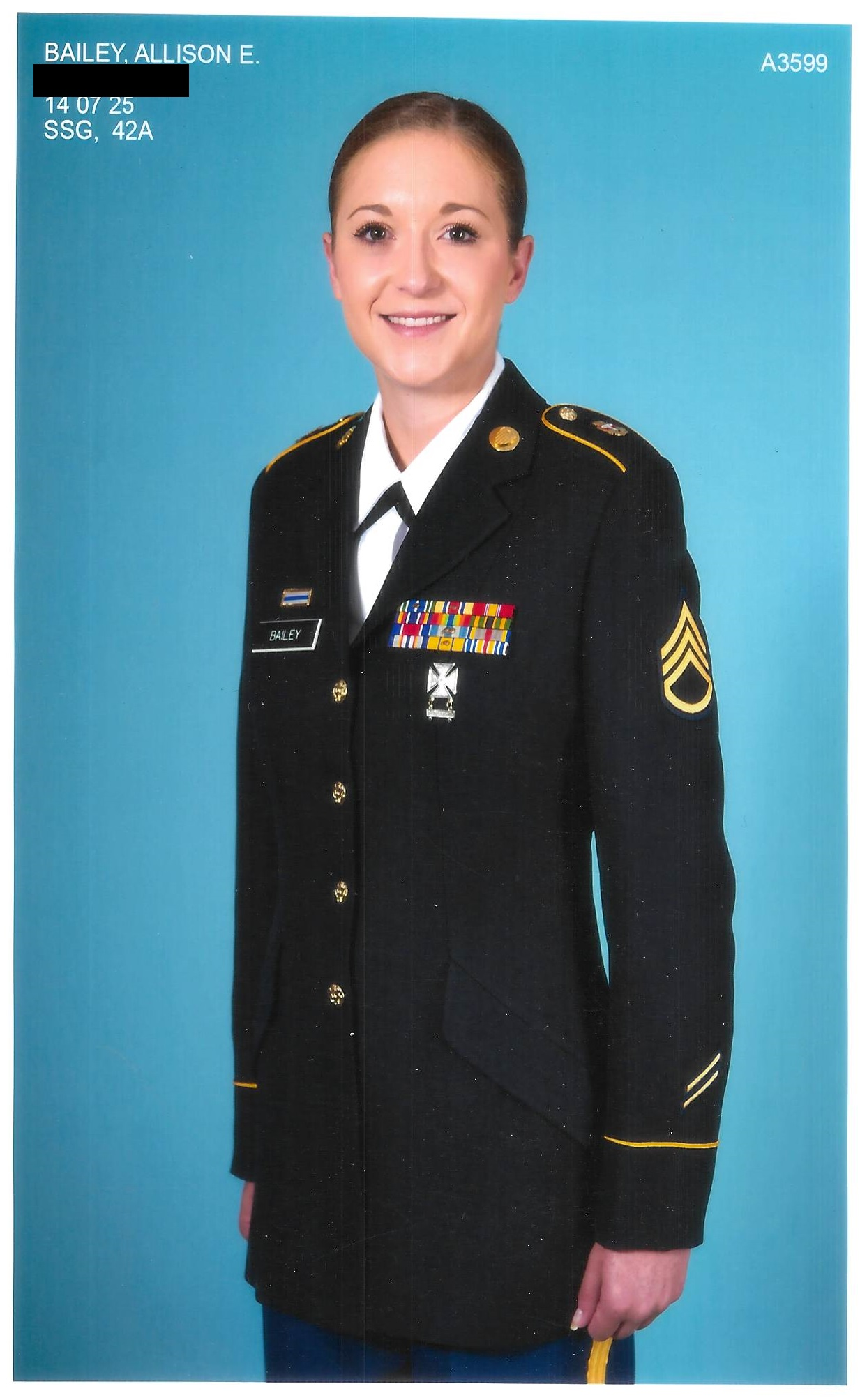
Allison Bailey's DA photo from 2014

Her discharge followed events after her blowing the whistle on bullying and a toxic work environment in the Guard in September 2020 and subsequent actions by the Guard in alleged retaliation against her in a misconduct investigation launched against her in December 2020. In January 2021 Bailey was pressured to report an alleged sexual assault incident by a subordinate soldier at an event with her unit. The sexual assault was referred to the Nevada Department of Public Safety, which could not secure enough evidence against the alleged attacker and closed the case in June 2021 due to "insufficient evidence for prosecution". Following the closure of the sexual assault investigation, the Nevada National Guard resumed its misconduct investigation, which resulted in a misconduct finding in a non-judicial hearing in September 2021.

Bailey held an exemplary military record, rising to the rank of Sergeant first class, and being the senior noncommissioned officer at her unit stationed in Nevada up to the point of her whistleblowing report. Following her report, and the subsequent investigations by the Nevada National Guard, Bailey's health deteriorated. Bailey requested a medical disability discharge evaluation in 2022, which was denied. Subsequently, a separation hearing was held instead, and she was removed from the Guard on January 15, 2023, in an "other than honorable discharge".

Bailey died six weeks later on March 4, 2023. Following Bailey's death, her case received in-depth news coverage and led to calls for a Department of Defense (DoD) investigation into the case, as well as several other victims of sexual assault and retaliation in response to whistleblowing coming forward.

In January 2025, Felicia Cavanagh, Bailey's mother, filed a lawsuit on constitutional grounds against the State of Nevada, the Nevada National Guard and principal members of the Guard that were involved in Bailey's case, alleging wrongful death as a result of Bailey having been denied the right to a fair trial in a court-martial.

The case sparked introduction of Nevada Senate Bill 95 in 2025, which would restore Nevada National Guard members right to a court-martial instead of being limited to a non-judicial punishment to allow them due process as guaranteed by the Constitution of the United States.
