= 116th Cavalry Brigade Combat Team =

- 116th Cavalry Brigade shoulder sleeve insignia
- Active: 21 September 1920–16 September 1940 (various formations of 116th Cavalry Rgt.); 16 September 1940–13 October 1945 (various units federal Field Artillery); 17 May 1947–12 September 1949 (116th Mech. Cav. Squadron); 12 September 1949–1 September 1989 (116th Armored Cav. Rgt.); 1 September 1989–16 March 2006 (116th Armored Cav. Bge.); •16 March 2006–present (116th CBCT)
- Country: United States
- Allegiance: Idaho Army National Guard
- Branch: United States Army National Guard
- Type: Cavalry
- Size: 3,000 personnel
- Part of: 34th Infantry Division
- Garrison/HQ: Boise, Idaho
- Engagements: World War II; Normandy; Northern France; Rhineland; Ardennes-Alsace; Central Europe; Armed Forces Expeditionary Force; Operation Joint Forge; Operation Iraqi Freedom; Operation New Dawn; Operation Inherent Resolve; Operation Spartan Shield

Commanders
- Current commander: COL Jason Gracida
- Notable commanders: William H. Abendroth; Raymond F. Rees

Insignia
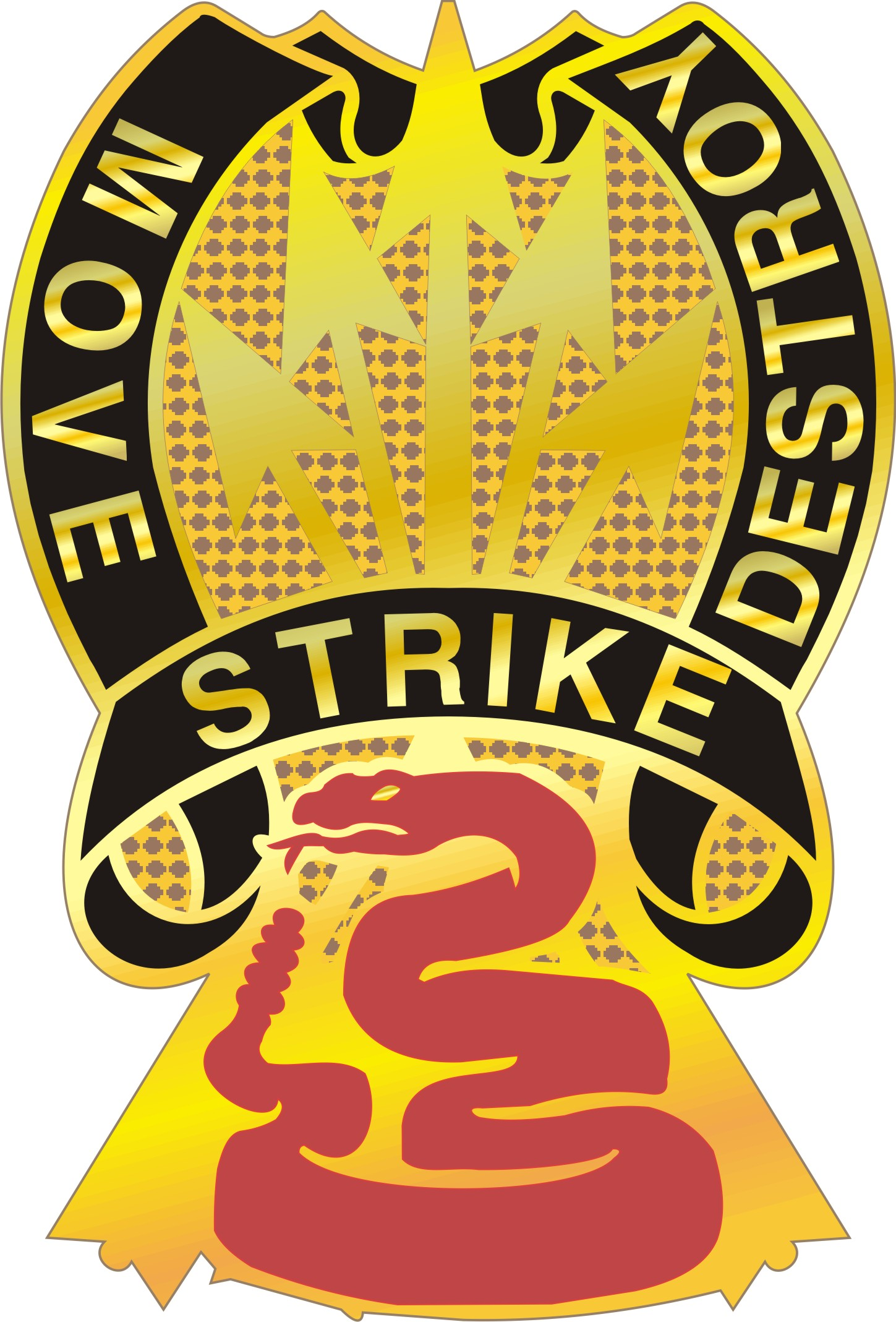
- Distinctive Unit Insignia

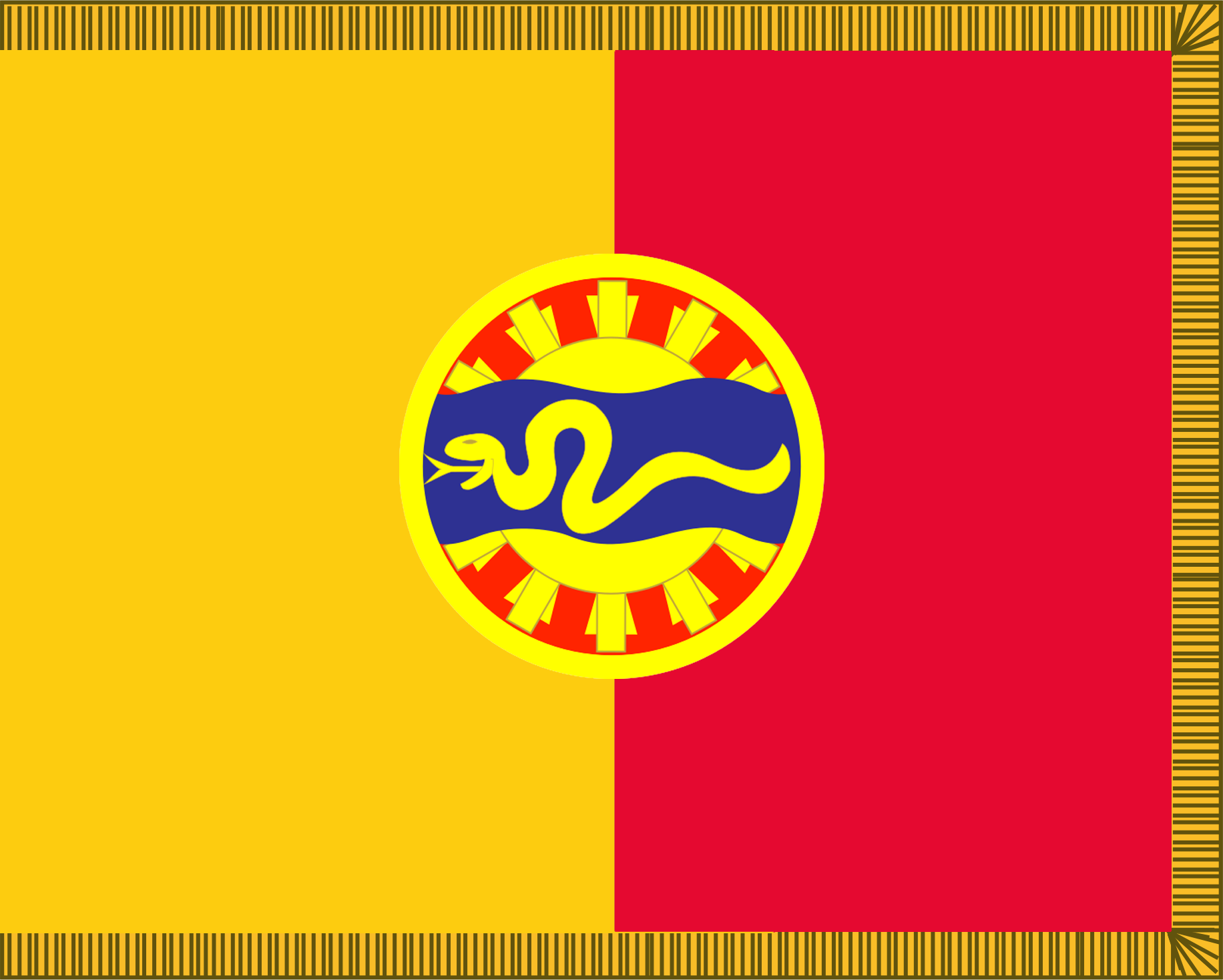
- 116th Cavalry Brigade Combat Team Flag

The 116th Cavalry Brigade Combat Team is the largest formation of the Idaho Army National Guard. It is headquartered at Gowen Field, Boise, Idaho. It has been reorganized into an Armored Brigade Combat Team (ABCT) but remains the only unit to be designated a "Cavalry Brigade Combat Team" by special appointment of the US Army. The 116th Cavalry Brigade Combat Team has units located throughout Idaho, Montana, Oregon, and Nevada. It was reorganized into a heavy armor brigade in 1989. Often referred to as the Snake River Brigade and formerly known as the 116th Armored Cavalry Regiment, the unit includes about 3,000 citizen-soldiers from Idaho.

In July 2016, the 116th CBCT took part in Exercise Saber Guardian, which involve deploying troop elements from Armenia, Azerbaijan, Bulgaria, Canada, Georgia, Moldova, Poland, Romania, Ukraine and the U.S. In May 2025, the Pentagon announced that the 116th Cavalry Brigade Combat Team will convert to a Mobile Brigade Combat Team.

There are Seven Battalions (Three Cavalry Battalions, One Infantry Battalion, One Field Artillery Battalion, One Engineer Battalion and One Support Battalion) and a Headquarters and Headquarters Company.Units of the 116Th CBCT are located in Idaho, Nevada, Oregon, and Montana.

== Organization 2025 ==
- 116th Cavalry Brigade Combat Team, at Gowen Field (ID)
  - Headquarters and Headquarters Company,116th Cavalry Brigade Combat Team, at Gowen Field (ID)
  - 1st Squadron, 221st Cavalry Regiment, in North Las Vegas (NV) (Nevada Army National Guard)
    - Headquarters and Headquarters Troop, 1st Squadron, 221st Cavalry Regiment, in North Las Vegas (NV)
    - Troop A, 1st Squadron, 221st Cavalry Regiment, in North Las Vegas (NV)
    - Troop B, 1st Squadron, 221st Cavalry Regiment, in North Las Vegas (NV)
    - Troop C, 1st Squadron, 221st Cavalry Regiment, in North Las Vegas (NV)
    - Troop D (Tank), 1st Squadron, 221st Cavalry Regiment, in North Las Vegas (NV)
  - 2nd Battalion, 116th Cavalry Regiment, in Caldwell (ID)
    - Headquarters and Headquarters Company, 2nd Battalion, 116th Cavalry Regiment, in Caldwell (ID)
    - Company A (Tank), 2nd Battalion, 116th Cavalry Regiment, in Emmett (ID)
    - Company B (Tank), 2nd Battalion, 116th Cavalry Regiment, in Nampa (ID)
    - Company C, 2nd Battalion, 116th Cavalry Regiment, at Gowen Field (ID)
  - 3rd Battalion, 116th Cavalry Regiment, in La Grande (OR) (Oregon Army National Guard)
    - Headquarters and Headquarters Company, 3rd Battalion, 116th Cavalry Regiment, in La Grande (OR)
      - Detachment 1, Headquarters and Headquarters Company, 3rd Battalion, 116th Cavalry Regiment, in Milton-Freewater (OR)
    - Company A (Tank), 3rd Battalion, 116th Cavalry Regiment, in Ontario (OR)
    - Company B (Tank), 3rd Battalion, 116th Cavalry Regiment, in Hermiston (OR)
    - Company C (Rifle), 3rd Battalion, 116th Cavalry Regiment, in Woodburn (OR)
  - 1st Battalion, 163rd Infantry Regiment, in Belgrade (MT) (Montana Army National Guard)
    - Headquarters and Headquarters Company, 1st Battalion, 163rd Infantry Regiment, in Belgrade (MT)
    - Company A, 1st Battalion, 163rd Infantry Regiment, in Billings (MT)
      - Detachment 1, Company A, 1st Battalion, 163rd Infantry Regiment, in Belgrade (MT)
    - Company B, 1st Battalion, 163rd Infantry Regiment, in Missoula (MT)
      - Detachment 1, Company B, 1st Battalion, 163rd Infantry Regiment, in Kalispell (MT)
    - Company C (Tank), 1st Battalion, 163rd Infantry Regiment, in Great Falls (MT)
  - 1st Battalion, 148th Field Artillery Regiment, in Pocatello (ID)
    - Headquarters and Headquarters Battery, 1st Battalion, 148th Field Artillery Regiment, in Pocatello (ID)
      - Detachment 4, Headquarters and Headquarters Battery, 1st Battalion, 148th Field Artillery Regiment, in North Las Vegas (NV) (Nevada Army National Guard)
    - Battery A, 1st Battalion, 148th Field Artillery Regiment, in Blackfoot (ID)
      - Detachment 1, Battery A, 1st Battalion, 148th Field Artillery Regiment, in Preston (ID)
    - Battery B, 1st Battalion, 148th Field Artillery Regiment, in Rexburg (ID)
      - Detachment 1, Battery B, 1st Battalion, 148th Field Artillery Regiment, in St. Anthony (ID)
    - Battery C, 1st Battalion, 148th Field Artillery Regiment, in Burley (ID)
  - 116th Brigade Engineer Battalion, in Twin Falls (ID)
    - Headquarters and Headquarters Company, 116th Brigade Engineer Battalion, in Twin Falls (ID)
    - Company A (Combat Engineer), 116th Brigade Engineer Battalion, in Mountain Home (ID)
      - Detachment 1, Company A (Combat Engineer), 116th Brigade Engineer Battalion, in Gooding (ID)
    - Company B (Engineer Support), 116th Brigade Engineer Battalion, in Moscow (ID)
      - Detachment 1, Company B (Engineer Support), 116th Brigade Engineer Battalion, in Grangeville (ID)
      - Detachment 2, Company B (Engineer Support), 116th Brigade Engineer Battalion, in Orofino (ID)
    - Company C (Signal), 116th Brigade Engineer Battalion, at Gowen Field (ID)
    - Company D (Military Intelligence), 116th Brigade Engineer Battalion, at Gowen Field (ID)
  - 145th Brigade Support Battalion, in Lewiston (ID)
    - Headquarters and Headquarters Company, 145th Brigade Support Battalion, in Lewiston (ID)
    - Company A (Distribution), 145th Brigade Support Battalion, in Post Falls (ID)
    - Company B (Maintenance), 145th Brigade Support Battalion, in Post Falls (ID)
    - Company C (Medical), 145th Brigade Support Battalion, in Boise (ID)
    - Company D (Forward Support), 145th Brigade Support Battalion, in North Las Vegas (NV) — attached to 1st Squadron, 221st Cavalry Regiment (Nevada Army National Guard)
    - Company E (Forward Support), 145th Brigade Support Battalion, in Jerome (ID) — attached to 116th Brigade Engineer Battalion
    - Company F (Forward Support), 145th Brigade Support Battalion, in Idaho Falls (ID) — attached to 1st Battalion, 148th Field Artillery Regiment
    - Company G (Forward Support), 145th Brigade Support Battalion, in Boise (ID) — attached to 2nd Battalion, 116th Cavalry Regiment
      - Detachment 1, Company G (Forward Support), 145th Brigade Support Battalion, in Rigby (ID)
    - Company H (Forward Support), 145th Brigade Support Battalion, in Baker City (OR) — attached to 3rd Battalion, 116th Cavalry Regiment (Oregon Army National Guard)
      - Detachment 1, Company H (Forward Support), 145th Brigade Support Battalion, in La Grande (OR)
    - Company I (Forward Support), 145th Brigade Support Battalion, at Fort William Henry Harrison (MT) — attached to 1st Battalion, 163rd Infantry Regiment (Montana Army National Guard)
      - Detachment 1, Company I (Forward Support), 145th Brigade Support Battalion, in Livingston (MT)

== Organization 2026 ==
- 116th Cavalry Brigade Combat Team (Mobile Infantry), at Gowen Field (ID)
  - Headquarters and Headquarters Company, 116th Cavalry Brigade Combat Team (Mobile Infantry), at Gowen Field (ID)
  - 1st Battalion, 116th Cavalry Regiment, in Lewiston (ID)
    - Headquarters and Headquarters Company, 1st Battalion, 116th Cavalry Regiment, in Lewiston (ID)
    - Company A (Mobile Infantry), 1st Battalion, 116th Cavalry Regiment, in Post Falls (ID)
    - Company B (Mobile Infantry), 1st Battalion, 116th Cavalry Regiment, in Post Falls (ID)
    - Company C (Mobile Infantry), 1st Battalion, 116th Cavalry Regiment, in St. Anthony (ID)
    - Company D (Multi-purpose Company), 1st Battalion, 116th Cavalry Regiment, in Grangeville (ID)
  - 2nd Battalion, 116th Cavalry Regiment, in Caldwell (ID)
    - Headquarters and Headquarters Company, 2nd Battalion, 116th Cavalry Regiment, in Caldwell (ID)
    - Company A (Mobile Infantry), 2nd Battalion, 116th Cavalry Regiment, in Burley (ID)
    - Company B (Mobile Infantry), 2nd Battalion, 116th Cavalry Regiment, in Nampa (ID)
    - Company C (Mobile Infantry), 2nd Battalion, 116th Cavalry Regiment, at Gowen Field (ID)
    - Company D (Multi-purpose Company), 2nd Battalion, 116th Cavalry Regiment, in Emmett (ID)
  - 1st Squadron, 221st Cavalry Regiment, in North Las Vegas (NV) (Nevada Army National Guard)
    - Headquarters and Headquarters Troop, 1st Squadron, 221st Cavalry Regiment, in North Las Vegas (NV)
    - Troop A (Mobile Infantry), 1st Squadron, 221st Cavalry Regiment, in North Las Vegas (NV)
    - Troop B (Mobile Infantry), 1st Squadron, 221st Cavalry Regiment, in North Las Vegas (NV)
    - Troop C (Mobile Infantry), 1st Squadron, 221st Cavalry Regiment, in North Las Vegas (NV)
    - Troop D (Multi-purpose Troop), 1st Squadron, 221st Cavalry Regiment, in North Las Vegas (NV)
  - M Company, 116th Cavalry Regiment (Multi-Functional Reconnaissance Company), in Boise (ID)
  - 126th Combat Engineer Company — Infantry, in Mountain Home (ID)
  - 122nd Signal Company, in Boise (ID)
  - 216th Military Intelligence Company, in Boise (ID)

=== Aligned units ===
34th Infantry Division units aligned with the 116th Cavalry Brigade Combat Team (Mobile Infantry):

- 34th Division Artillery
  - 1st Battalion, 148th Field Artillery Regiment, in Pocatello (ID) — assigned administratively to the 116th Cavalry Brigade Combat Team (Mobile Infantry)
    - Headquarters and Headquarters Battery, 1st Battalion, 148th Field Artillery Regiment, in Pocatello (ID)
      - Detachment 4, Headquarters and Headquarters Battery, 1st Battalion, 148th Field Artillery Regiment, in North Las Vegas (NV) (Nevada Army National Guard)
    - Battery A, 1st Battalion, 148th Field Artillery Regiment, in Blackfoot (ID)
    - Battery B, 1st Battalion, 148th Field Artillery Regiment, in Rexburg (ID)
    - Battery C, 1st Battalion, 148th Field Artillery Regiment, in Boise (ID)
    - Service Battery, 1st Battalion, 148th Field Artillery Regiment, in Idaho Falls (ID)
      - Detachment 1, Service Battery, 1st Battalion, 148th Field Artillery Regiment, in Rigby (ID)
- 34th Division Sustainment Brigade
  - 145th Light Support Battalion, in Jerome (ID) — under operational control of the 116th Cavalry Brigade Combat Team (Mobile Infantry)
    - Headquarters Distribution Company, 145th Light Support Battalion, in Jerome (ID)
    - Company A (Maintenance and Supply), 145th Brigade Support Battalion, in Jerome (ID)
    - Company B (Medical), 145th Brigade Support Battalion, in Boise (ID)
    - Company C (Combat Logistic), 145th Brigade Support Battalion, at Gowen Field (ID) — aligned with the 2nd Battalion, 116th Cavalry Regiment
    - Company D (Combat Logistic), 145th Brigade Support Battalion, in North Las Vegas (NV) — aligned with the 1st Squadron, 221st Cavalry Regiment (Nevada Army National Guard)
    - Company E (Combat Logistic), 145th Brigade Support Battalion, in Orofino (ID) — aligned with the 1st Battalion, 116th Cavalry Regiment

== History ==
The 116th Cavalry Regiment was constituted in the National Guard in 1921, assigned to the 24th Cavalry Division, and allotted to the states of Idaho and Utah. The regimental headquarters was organized on 1 May 1922 at Boise, Idaho, by redesignation of headquarters, 1st Regiment, Idaho Cavalry. (organized and federally recognized on 29 October 1920 at Boise) as the 116th Cavalry. Subordinate squadron headquarters were organized and federally recognized as follows: 2nd Squadron organized on 1 January 1922 at Salt Lake City, Utah, from the 1st Squadron, 1st Regiment, Utah Cavalry; 1st Squadron organized on 1 May 1922 at Pocatello, Idaho, from the 1st Squadron, 1st Regiment, Idaho Cavalry. The 2nd Squadron was converted and reorganized as the 1st Battalion, 222nd Field Artillery Regiment, on 29 September 1924. Concurrently, the 2nd Squadron, 116th Cavalry, was withdrawn from the state of Utah and allotted to the state of Idaho, but not immediately reorganized.

The 116th Cavalry was reorganized on 15 March 1929 as a three-squadron regiment. Concurrently, the regimental headquarters was relocated to Weiser, Idaho, and the 2nd Squadron was organized with headquarters at Caldwell, Idaho. A new 3rd Squadron was organized on 26 April 1929 with headquarters at Weiser. The regimental headquarters was relocated on 9 December 1930 to Boise. The 2nd Squadron performed martial law duties to counter striking miners in the Clearwater National Forest near Pierce, Idaho, from 3–23 August 1936. The regiment conducted summer training at Boise Barracks, Idaho, from 1921–35, and at Camp Bonneville, Idaho, from 1936–39. It was relieved on 16 September 1940 from the 24th Cavalry Division on 16 September 1940 and concurrently converted and redesignated the 183d Field Artillery Regiment.

The 183rd Field Artillery was inducted into federal service on 1 April 1941 at home stations. The regiment was broken up on 8 February 1943 and its elements were reorganized and redesignated as follows: Headquarters and Headquarters Battery as Headquarters and Headquarters Battery, 183rd Field Artillery Group; the 1st Battalion as the 183rd Field Artillery Battalion (inactivated on 30 October 1944, Camp Myles Standish, Massachusetts); the 2nd Battalion as the 951st Field Artillery Battalion (iinactivated on 13 October 1945 also at Camp Myles Standish).

The above units were reorganized as elements of the 183rd Infantry (Headquarters was federally recognized on 10 January 1947 at Twin Falls) and the 116th Mechanized Cavalry Reconnaissance Squadron (Headquarters was federally recognized on 8 January 1947 at Caldwell). The 183rd Infantry (less 3rd Battalion) and 116th Mechanized Cavalry Reconnaissance Squadron were consolidated, reorganized, and redesignated on 12 September 1949 as the 116th Armored Cavalry with headquarters at Twin Falls. The 3rd Battalion, 183rd Infantry, was concurrently converted and redesignated as the 116th Engineer Combat Battalion—hereafter separate lineage. The 3rd Squadron was allotted on 15 December 1967 to the Nevada Army National Guard; it was relieved on 11 May 1974 from allotment to the Nevada Army National Guard and allotted to the Oregon Army National Guard. The 1st Squadron was relieved on 1 May 1977 from allotment to the Idaho Army National Guard. The Attack Helicopter Company was allotted on 1 September 1975 to the Washington and Wyoming Army National Guard. The 116th was one of the four Army National Guard armored cavalry regiments during the 1980s, along with the 107th Armored Cavalry Regiment, 163rd Armored Cavalry Regiment and the 278th Armored Cavalry Regiment.

The unit reorganized and was redesignated on 1 September 1989 in the Idaho and Oregon Army National Guard as the 116th Cavalry, a parent regiment under the United States Army Regiment System, to consist of the 2nd and 3rd Battalions and Troop E, elements of the 116th Cavalry Brigade, and Troop F, and element of the 41st Infantry Brigade. The 116th Cavalry Brigade then joined the 4th Infantry Division as the roundout brigade. It was reorganized on 1 October 1995 to consist of the 2nd and 3rd Battalions, elements of the 116th Cavalry Brigade and in 1996 the brigade left the 4th Infantry Division.

=== Operation JOINT FORGE (SFOR XI) ===
Approximately 300 Idaho and Montana Army National Guardsmen and women of the 116th served in Bosnia in 2001 and 2002. The 116th Cavalry Brigade, headquartered at Gowen Field, deployed approximately 100 soldiers in March 2002, returning in October 2002. The 116th was under the command and control of the Army's 25th Infantry Division, Hawaii, during the deployment. The 91st Division (Training Support) trained the 116th Cavalry Brigade prior to its deployment to Bosnia for Stabilization Force 11.

=== Operation Iraqi Freedom III ===
In the early part of 2004 the 116th Cavalry Brigade was alerted for a mobilization to support Operation Iraqi Freedom. In June that year the entire brigade deployed for 18 months. The brigade spent the first six months at Fort Bliss, TX and Fort Polk, LA training for their combat mission.

The majority of the brigade arrived in Iraq late 2004. The 116th Cavalry Brigade was assigned to the northern part of Iraq, primarily in and around the oil-rich city of Kirkuk with elements occupying FOB Warrior, FOB McHenry and FOB Gaines' Mill. For nearly a full year the soldiers of the 116th Cavalry Brigade conducted full spectrum operations in and around Kirkuk, stabilizing the region for national elections, and training the Iraqi Army and police forces.

The Iraq deployment marked the first time in the 116th Cavalry Brigade's history that the entire brigade had deployed together. This was also the first time that the 116th shoulder sleeve insignia was authorized to be worn as the Shoulder Sleeve Insignia – Former Wartime Service (often referred to as a combat patch).

As a cavalry unit, many soldiers serving in the brigade during the deployment were authorized to wear the gold combat spurs.

In November 2005 the 116th Cavalry Brigade redeployed to the United States. After redeployment the 116th Cavalry was officially redesignated from 116th Cavalry Brigade to 116th Cavalry Brigade Combat Team.

=== Operation New Dawn ===
On 17 September 2010 the brigade began a 12-month deployment to Iraq, first traveling to Camp Shelby, Mississippi, for training and premobilization certification. After serving for a year in various locations in Iraq performing Force Protection missions, the brigade returned to Idaho in September 2011.

During their deployment, they conducted numerous Force Protection missions. The unit was spread all over Iraq, being the main controlling task force for the country, from late November 2010 to early September 2011, when they turned the country over to the Kentucky National Guard.

From Quick Reaction Force platoons, convoy security teams, to ECP operations as well as administrative and biometrics operations, UAV operations, the 116th play a major role in initiating Operation New Dawn and the overall turnover of the country to the Iraqi Government.

== Insignia ==
=== Shoulder Sleeve Insignia ===
Description: On a scarlet disc with a 1/8 inch (0.32 cm) yellow border 2 1/2 inches (6.4 cm) in diameter overall, a yellow sun emitting twelve rays surmounted by a blue horizontal wavy band bearing a yellow gliding snake.

Symbolism: The wavy band and the snake are taken from the coat of arms of the former organization, the 116th Armored Cavalry Regiment. The wavy band and snake represent the Snake River, and refer to the home area of the former organization, the Snake River Valley. The sun alludes to the state of Idaho, noted for the beauty of its sunrises. The name is taken from Shoshoni Indian words meaning " the sun comes down the mountain" or "it is morning." The predominant color, yellow, is representative of Armored Cavalry units.

Background: The shoulder sleeve insignia was originally approved for the 116th Armored Cavalry Regiment on 9 October 1967. The insignia was redesignated and the symbolism revised on 1 September 1989.

=== Distinctive unit insignia ===
A gold color metal and enamel device 1 3/16 inches (3.0 cm) high, consisting of a bundle of five gold arrows, points up, encompassed on either side of the tripartite black scroll passing across the center of the arrows and inscribed "MOVE STRIKE DESTROY" in gold letters; overall in base a red coiled rattlesnake.

Symbolism: Yellow/gold is the color traditionally associated with Cavalry. The coiled rattlesnake epitomizes the unit's motto – capabilities and military preparedness. The snake also alludes to the unit's association with the old 116th Armored Cavalry Regiment. The five arrows symbolize the unit's five campaign credits during World War II as Field Artillery; scarlet and yellow/gold are the colors associated with Field Artillery.

Background: The distinctive unit insignia was authorized on 2 May 1989.
