= Kristian Foden-Vencil =

American journalist

Kristian Foden-Vencil is a radio journalist best known for his work as a reporter and producer for Oregon Public Broadcasting (OPB).

== Career ==
Foden-Vencil's career began in 1988, as a newspaper reporter in London, England. He later moved to Oregon and produced work as a freelancer. He produced works as early as 1996 for local organizations such as The Oregonian, Willamette Week, and the Salem Statesman Journal. His works received broader exposure through outlets including the BBC, NPR, the Canadian Broadcasting Corporation and Voice of America. He was embedded in Iraq with the Oregon National Guard in 2004.

His current work focuses on areas of health care, commerce, politics, legal issues and issues concerning public safety.

== Awards ==
He shared a Peabody Award in 2009 for work on the OPB radio series Hard Times, which examined the human impacts of the economic recession of the time.

== Education ==
He is a graduate of the University of Westminster in London.
