= Camp Rilea Heliport =

- IATA: none; ICAO: none; FAA LID: 15OR

Summary
- Airport type: Military
- Owner: Oregon National Guard
- Location: Warrenton, Oregon
- Elevation AMSL: 32 ft (9.8 m)
- Coordinates: 46°06′59.38″N 123°55′53.52″W
- Interactive map of Camp Rilea Heliport

Helipads
| Number | Length | | Surface |
| Number | ft | m | Surface |
|---|---|---|---|
| H1 | 60 | 18 | Turf |

Camp Rilea Heliport (FAA LID: 15OR) is a military heliport three miles (4.8 km) south of the city of Warrenton in Clatsop County, Oregon, United States.

It is located at Camp Rilea Armed Forces Training Center.
