= Raymond F. Rees =

United States Army general

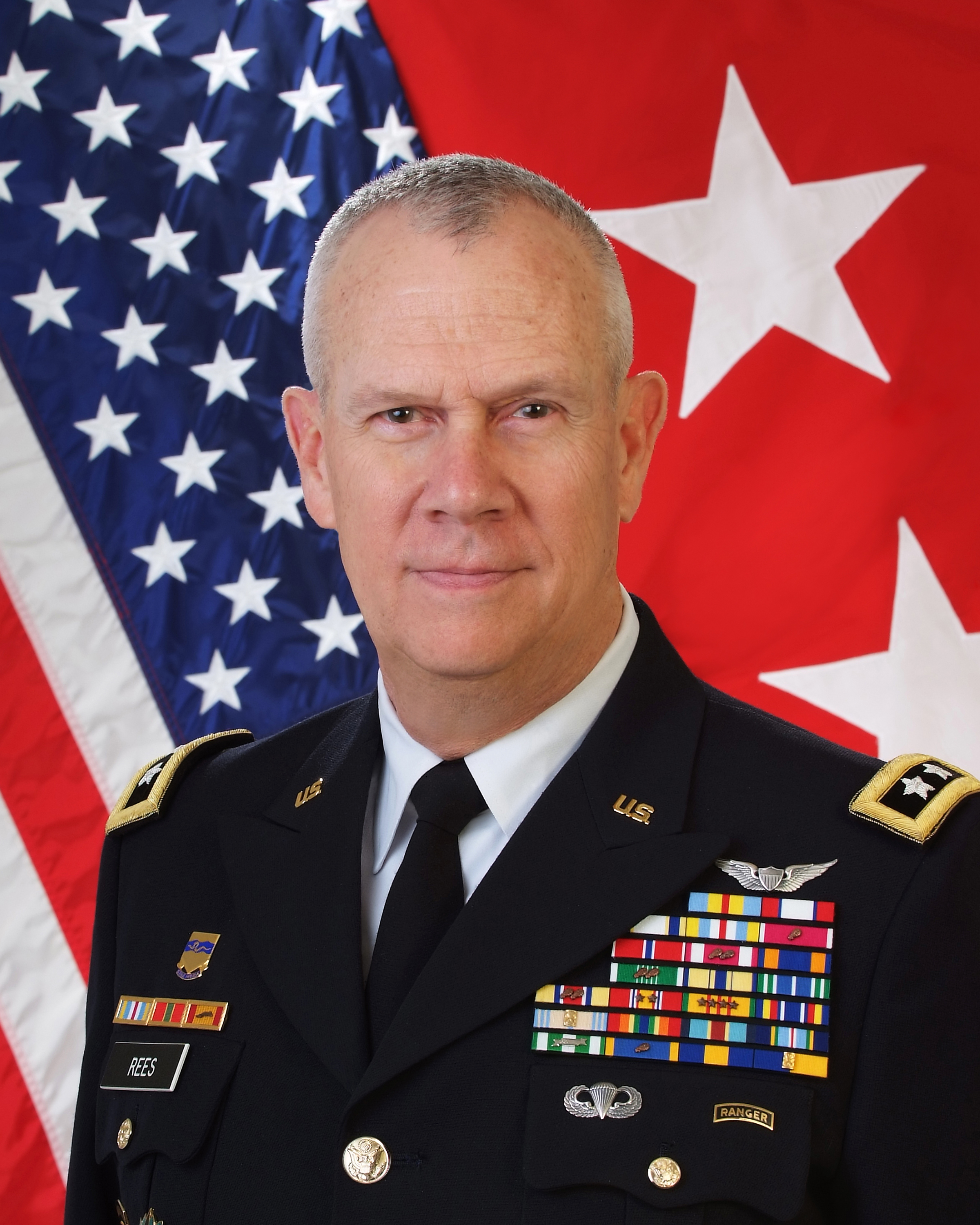
- Rees in 2012
- Born: September 29, 1944 (age 82); Helix, Oregon, U.S.
- Military career
- Allegiance: United States
- Branch: United States Army
- Service years: 1966–2013
- Rank: Major General
- Nickname: Fred
- Units: National Guard Bureau; Oregon National Guard
- Commands: Chief of the National Guard Bureau; Army National Guard; Oregon Military Department; 116th Armored Cavalry Regiment
- Conflicts: Vietnam War
- Awards: Defense Distinguished Service Medal; Army Distinguished Service Medal (2); Air Force Distinguished Service Medal; Defense Superior Service Medal; Legion of Merit (2); Bronze Star Medal
- Other work: Deputy Assistant Secretary of the Army for Training, Readiness and Mobilization

Raymond F. Rees (born September 29, 1944) was Deputy Assistant Secretary of the Army for Training, Readiness and Mobilization from 2014 to 2019. He was appointed to that position as a career member of the Senior Executive Service on February 10, 2014. He is also a retired United States Army major general who served as the adjutant general of Oregon and was director of the Army National Guard and acting chief of the National Guard Bureau.

As adjutant general, Rees was responsible for providing the State of Oregon and the United States with a ready force of citizen soldiers and airmen, equipped and trained to respond to any contingency, natural or man made. He directed, managed, and supervised the administration, discipline, organization, training and mobilization of the Oregon National Guard, the Oregon State Defense Force, the Joint Force Headquarters and the Office of Oregon Emergency Management. He was also assigned as the governor's homeland security advisor. In these roles he developed and coordinated all policies, plans and programs of the Oregon National Guard in concert with the governor and state legislature.

== Early life ==
Raymond Frederick "Fred" Rees was born on September 29, 1944, in Helix, Oregon. He graduated from Helix's Griswold High School in 1962 and the United States Military Academy in 1966, and was commissioned as a second lieutenant of Armor.

== Military career ==
Rees completed Airborne and Ranger training, and was assigned as a platoon leader with the 2nd Armored Cavalry Regiment in West Germany. After completing several assignments, including two as commander of troops in the 2nd ACR, Rees went to Panama for Jungle warfare training.

In December 1968, Rees was assigned to Vietnam, serving as Assistant Training and Operations Officer (S3 Air) for 2nd Battalion, 17th Cavalry Regiment, 101st Airborne Division and commander of Troop D, 2nd Battalion, 17th Cavalry.

After returning to the United States, Rees completed training as an Army Aviator. From March 1972 to August 1973 he was assigned to 1st Battalion, 17th Cavalry Regiment, 82nd Airborne Division. From August to November 1973 he was assigned to the United States Army Reserve Control Group.

== Oregon National Guard and National Guard Bureau ==
Upon leaving the active army, Rees joined the Oregon Army National Guard. He advanced through several command and staff positions of increasing rank and responsibility, including command of Company C, 2nd Battalion, 162nd Infantry Regiment as a captain and 3rd Squadron, 116th Armored Cavalry Regiment as a lieutenant colonel. From November 1986 to May 1987, he was commander of the 116th Armored Cavalry Regiment and was promoted to colonel.

Rees also completed law school, practiced as an attorney for 18 months, and managed his family's farm.

In May 1987, Rees was appointed Adjutant General of Oregon by Governor Neil Goldschmidt, the first of three times Rees has served in this position. He served until June 1991 and was promoted to brigadier general in 1988 and major general in 1990.

From July 1991 to August 1992, Rees served as director of the Army National Guard, succeeding Donald Burdick. In September 1992 he was appointed vice chief of the National Guard Bureau, where he served until January 1994. From January to July 1994, Rees served as acting chief of the National Guard Bureau.

In August 1994, Rees was again named Adjutant General of Oregon by Governor Barbara Roberts. During this appointment, his second, he served a five-year term, until March 1999. That month, Rees was appointed as vice chief of the National Guard Bureau for the second time, and he served until August 2002. From August 2002 to April 2003 he was again acting chief of the National Guard Bureau. From April to May 2003 he completed his assignment as the NGB vice chief.

Rees served as chief of staff for the United States Northern Command from May 2003 to June 2005. In July 2005 Rees was appointed Adjutant General of Oregon for the third time. Beginning in 2009, Rees commenced another four-year term as adjutant general, serving under both Governors Ted Kulongoski and John Kitzhaber. Rees' final tenure as adjutant general was noteworthy for Oregon's increased participation in the State Partnership Program. In 2008 Oregon established a partnership with Bangladesh. Oregon also established a partnership with Vietnam. During workshops and coordination meetings, Rees compared Vietnam War experiences with his counterparts in the Vietnam People's Army.

In 2012 Rees announced that he would retire the following year, and a search began for his successor. Rees retired in a ceremony on July 13, 2013, with his official date of retirement as July 31, and his 47 years of service surpassed the tenure of most full (four-star) generals. His retirement ceremony was attended by former governor Kulongoski and General Frank J. Grass, the Chief of the National Guard Bureau, who presented Rees with the Distinguished Service Medal.

== Return to the Pentagon ==
In February 2014, Rees began work as Deputy Assistant Secretary of the Army for Training, Readiness and Mobilization. In this role he had oversight responsibility for the army's preparation of soldiers to ensure they are ready for overseas deployment and other contingencies. He retired in 2019.

== Education ==
In addition to his bachelor's degree from West Point, Rees completed his Juris Doctor degree at the University of Oregon School of Law in 1976. He is also a graduate of the United States Army Command and General Staff College (1977) and the Senior Reserve Component Officer Course at the United States Army War College (1989).

== Personal ==
In the 2024 United States presidential election, Rees endorsed Kamala Harris.

== Awards and decorations ==
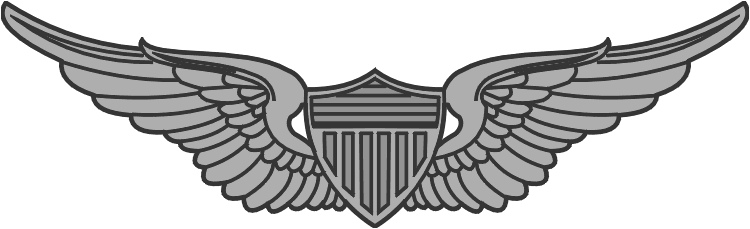
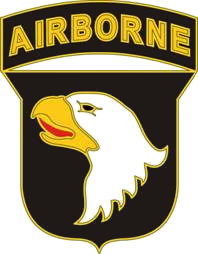
Army Aviator Badge
Basic Parachutist Badge
Ranger tab
Secretary of Defense Identification Badge
Army Staff Identification Badge
101st Airborne Division Combat Service Identification Badge
116th Cavalry Regiment Distinctive Unit Insignia
2 Overseas Service Bars

Defense Distinguished Service Medal
Army Distinguished Service Medal with one bronze oak leaf cluster
Air Force Distinguished Service Medal
Defense Superior Service Medal
Legion of Merit with oak leaf cluster
Bronze Star Medal
Meritorious Service Medal with two Oak Leaf Clusters
Air Medal
Army Commendation Medal with 2 Oak Leaf Clusters
Air Force Commendation Medal
Army Achievement Medal
Joint Meritorious Unit Award
Army Superior Unit Award
Army Reserve Component Achievement Medal with 2 Oak Leaf Clusters
National Defense Service Medal with two bronze service stars
Vietnam Service Medal with four service stars
Global War on Terrorism Service Medal
Armed Forces Reserve Medal with gold Hourglass device
Army Service Ribbon
Army Overseas Service Ribbon
Special Operations Service Ribbon
Vietnam Gallantry Cross Unit Citation
Vietnam Campaign Medal
Oregon Exceptional Service Medal with oak leaf cluster
Oregon 30 Year Faithful Service Medal
Oregon Faithful Service Medal with gold Hourglass device

In 2007, Rees received the Raymond S. McLain Medal from the Association of the United States Army.

On April 28, 2011, he was awarded a Lifetime Achievement Award by the Software Association of Oregon.

Military offices
Preceded by Russell C. Davis	Chief of the National Guard Bureau; 2002–2003 (acting)	Succeeded by H Steven Blum
Preceded by Edward G. Anderson III	Deputy Commander of the United States Northern Command; 2004	Succeeded by Joseph R. Inge
Preceded by Philip G. Killey	Chief of the National Guard Bureau; 1994 (acting)	Succeeded by Edward D. Baca
