= 116 Squadron =

116 Squadron or 116th Squadron may refer to:

- 116 Squadron (Israel)
- 116 Squadron, Republic of Singapore Air Force, see list of Republic of Singapore Air Force squadrons
- No. 116 Squadron RCAF, Canada
- No. 116 Squadron RAF, United Kingdom
- 116th Air Control Squadron, United States Air Force
- 116th Air Refueling Squadron, United States Air Force
- VAW-116, United States Navy
