= Oregon Army National Guard =

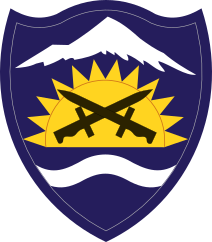
- Active: 1866-present
- Country: United States
- Allegiance: Oregon
- Branch: United States Army
- Role: United States Army National Guard
- Part of: Oregon Military Department

Commanders
- Commander in Chief: President of the United States (If Federalized) - Donald Trump
- Commander in Chief: Governor of Oregon - Tina Kotek

Insignia
- Oregon Army National Guard Crest

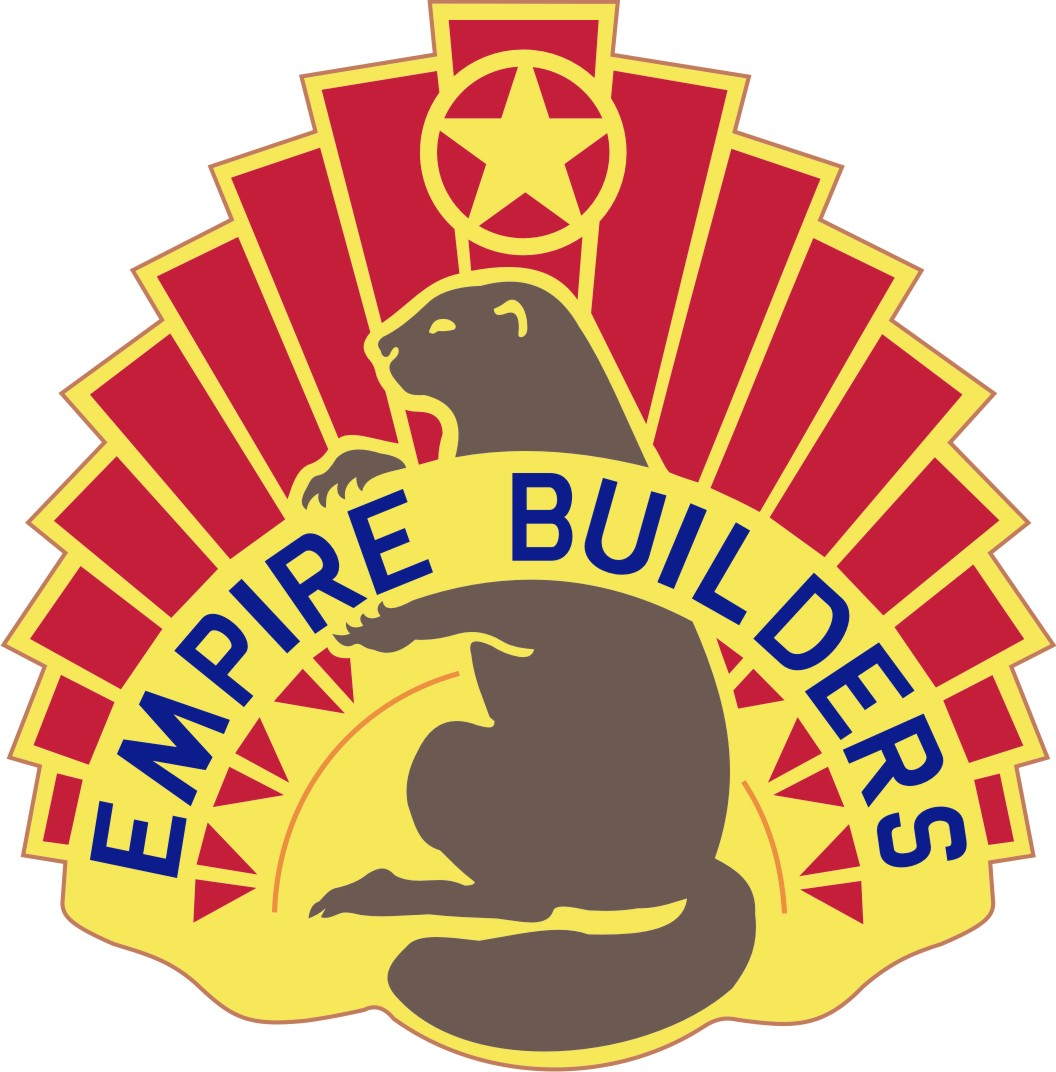
- Oregon Army National Guard STARC DUI

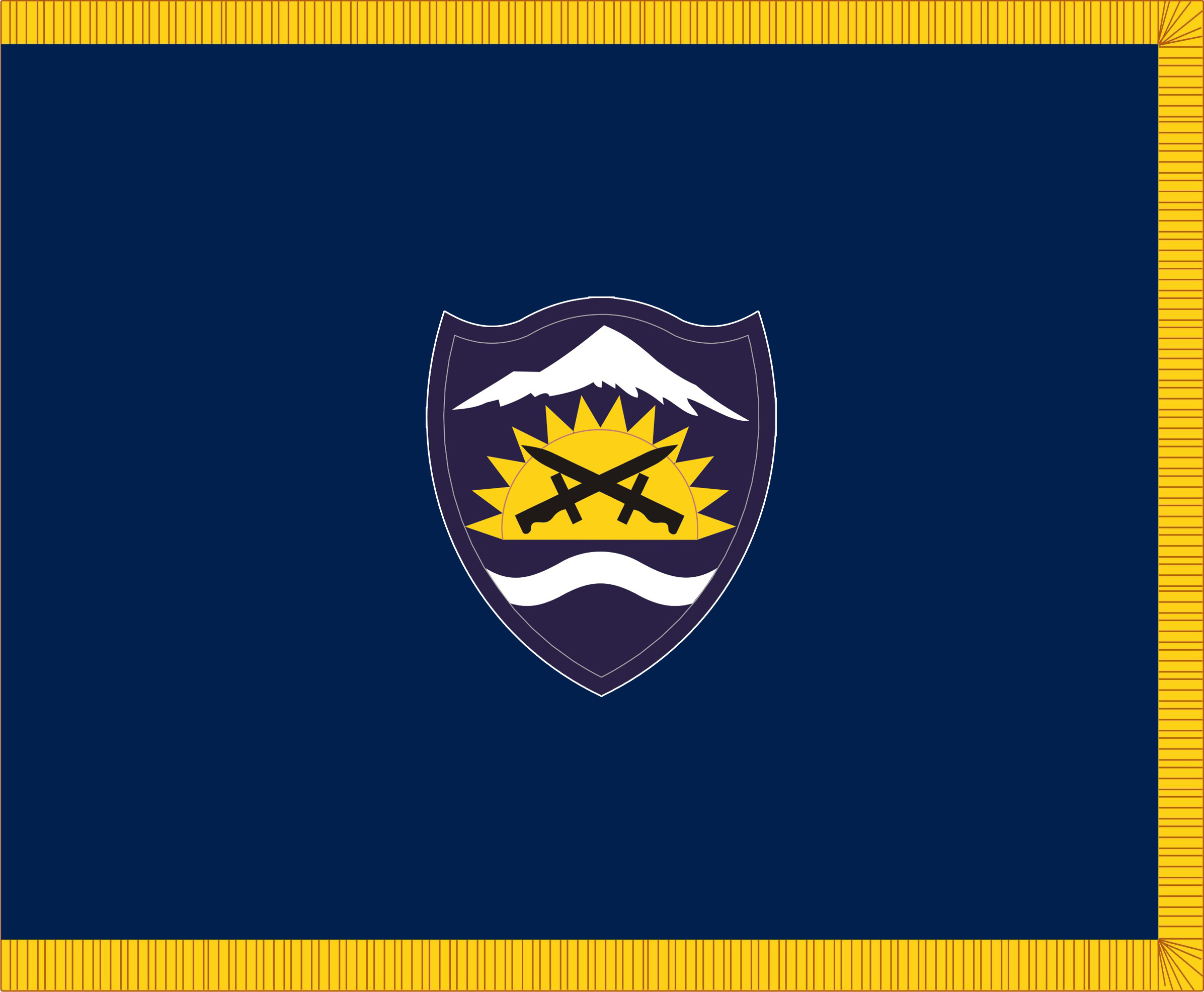
- Oregon Army National Guard Headquarters Flag

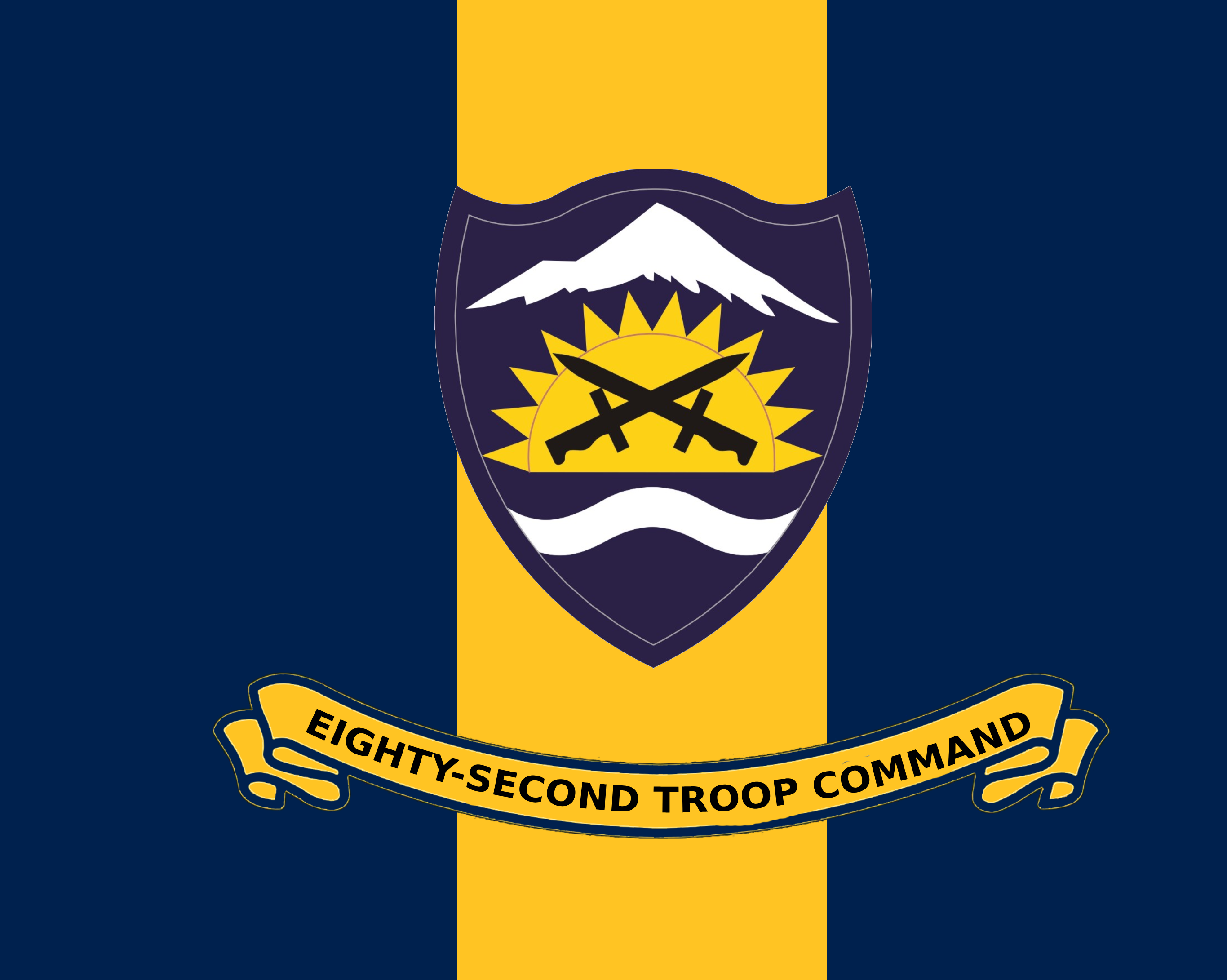
- Oregon Army National Guard 82nd Troop Command Flag

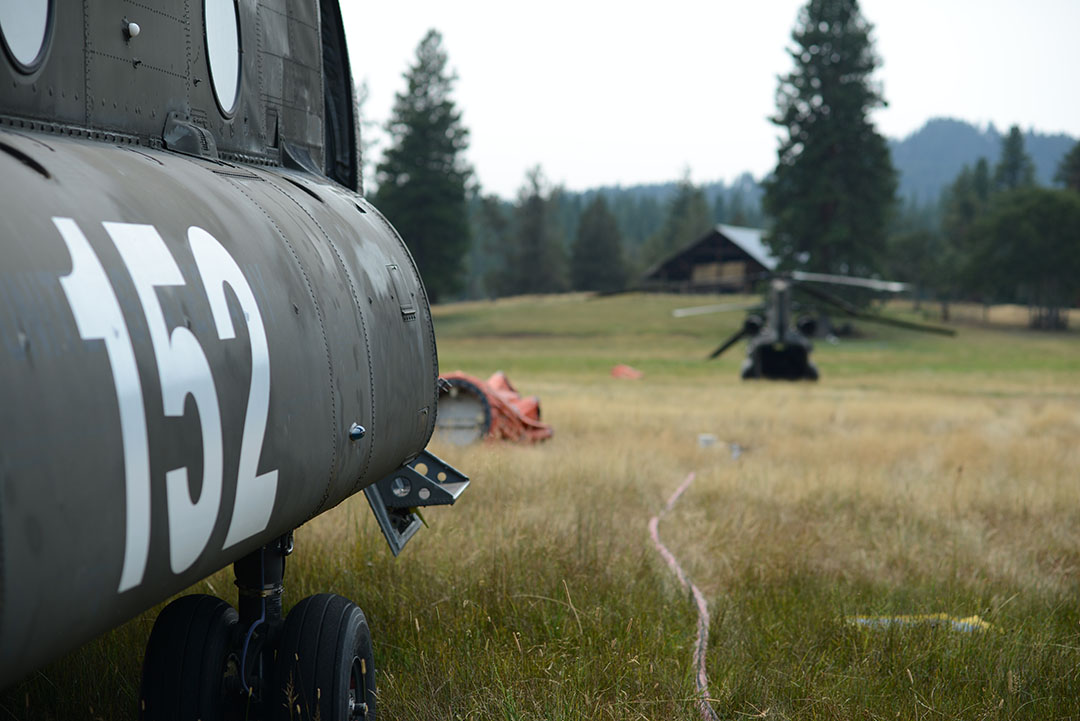
A CH-47D Chinook helicopter of the Oregon Army National Guard

The Oregon Army National Guard is a federally mandated and equipped military organization under the civilian direction of the Oregon Military Department, with the governor of Oregon as its Commander-in-Chief. It responds to state and national emergencies, military conflicts and natural disasters, and conducts search and rescue operations. While the history of the militia dates back to the establishment of the first Oregon militia in 1843, the present Guard was not established until after 1903. The modern Guard includes citizen soldiers, and its motto is "When we are needed, we are there."

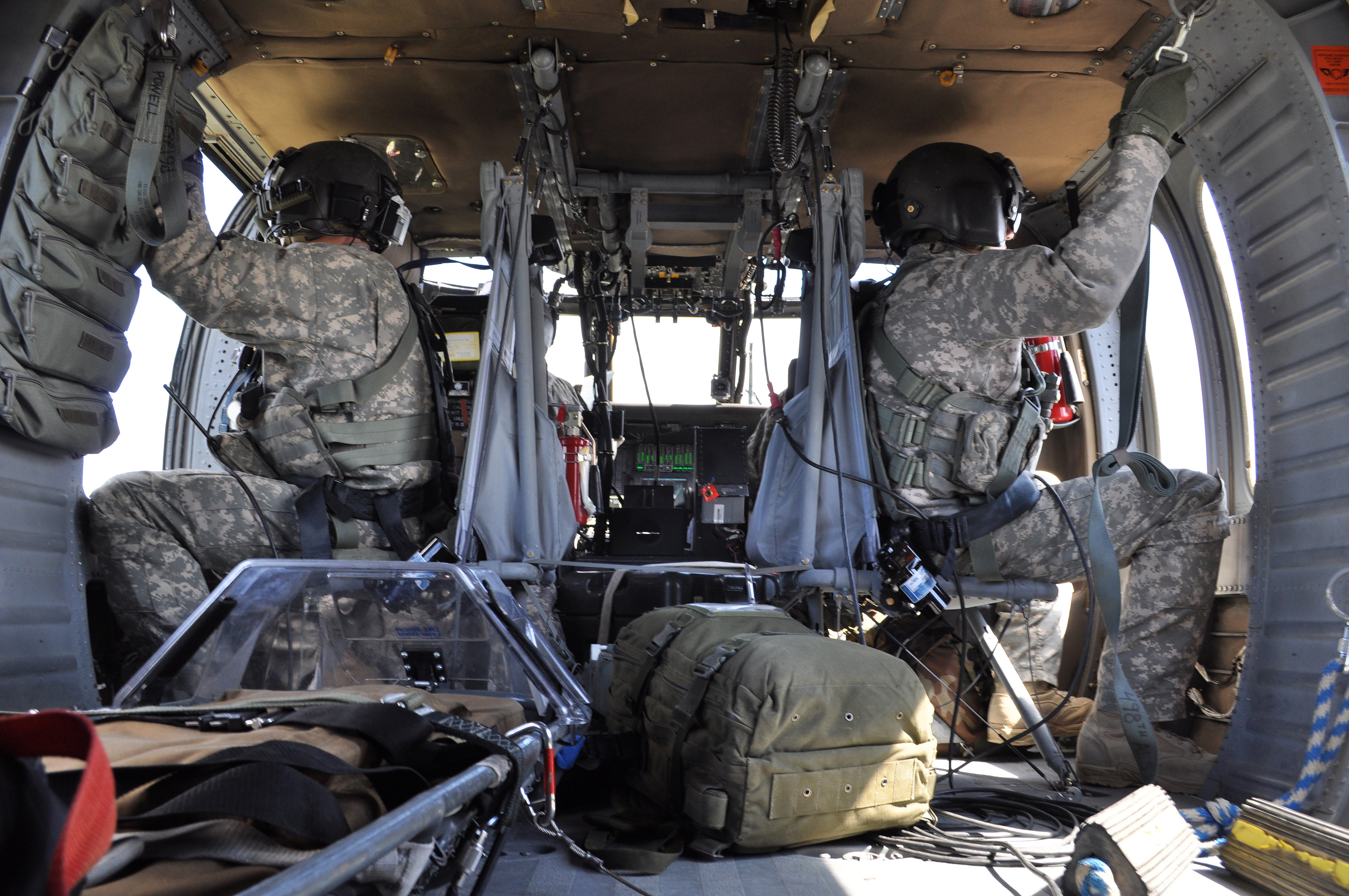
National Guardsmen assist in the search for Kyron Horman

The Oregon Army National Guard has 41 armories in 33 communities.

== History ==
Oregon Army National Guard soldiers have been deployed to Afghanistan, ranging from 9 months to more than a year. Some provided security in Afghanistan during the drawdown of troops. Others with an engineer battalion worked on soldier housing in Kuwait and U.S. military facilities in Kuwait, Jordan, Iraq and Afghanistan.

=== Historic units ===
- 82nd Armor - organized 1959
- 162nd Infantry Regiment
- 186th Infantry Regiment
- 218th Field Artillery Regiment – Perpetuated the Portland Light Artillery Battery organized in 1866, Oregon's oldest continuously active National Guard unit and the oldest continuously active National Guard unit west of the Mississippi. Split into 218th and 2nd Battalion, 204th Field Artillery 1942; the latter became the 965th Field Artillery Battalion in 1943.
- 249th Coast Artillery Regiment – Split into 171st and 249th Coast Artillery Battalions 18 October 1944 during World War II.
- 1st Battalion, 249th Infantry (1980–1993) – HHD Newberg, separate TOW Light Anti-Tank (TLAT) battalion.
- 641st Military Intelligence Battalion In 1982 the 1042nd Military Intelligence Company was reorganized and redesignated as the 641st Military Intelligence Battalion. It became a Combat Electronic Warfare and Intelligence battalion in 1985. The battalion is not listed in the 1996 unit listings in Army Lineage Series - Military Intelligence which suggests that it had been disestablished by that date.
- 641st Medical Battalion
- 741st Corps Support Battalion
- 249th Artillery Group (Air Defense) (1959–1971)
  - 1st Automatic Weapons Battalion, 249th Artillery (1959–1963) – Converted to 2nd Battalion, 303rd Armor 1963, consolidated with 2nd Battalion, 186th Infantry to become 3rd Squadron, 163rd Armored Cavalry
  - 2nd Automatic Weapons Battalion, 249th Artillery (1959–1968)
  - 3rd Gun Battalion, 249th Artillery (1959–1961) – Reorganized as 3rd Automatic Weapons Battalion, 249th Artillery 1961, then 3rd Battalion, 249th Artillery 1965, converted to 1249th Engineer Battalion 1971
- 162nd Engineer Battalion (1947–1965)
- 218th Field Artillery Battalion (1947–1959) – Continued lineage of World War II 218th Field Artillery Battalion, formed after the 218th Field Artillery was split. Lineage continued by 218th Artillery 1959.
- 965th Field Artillery Battalion (1949–1959) – Continued lineage of World War II 965th Field Artillery Battalion, formed after the 218th Field Artillery was split. Lineage continued by 218th Artillery 1959.
- 237th Antiaircraft Artillery Group (1948–1959)
  - 722nd Antiaircraft Artillery Battalion (1947–1959) – Previously 249th Coast Artillery Battalion (Harbor Defense) and 1st Battalion, 249th Coast Artillery (Harbor Defense). Redesignated as 722nd Antiaircraft Artillery Gun Battalion 10 July 1946, reorganized and Federally recognized 31 January 1950 with HHC Portland and batteries at Portland, Redmond, Gresham and Salem. Reorganized and redesignated 16 July 1951 as 722nd Antiaircraft Artillery Automatic Weapons Battalion, redesignated 1 October 1953 as 722nd Antiaircraft Artillery Battalion (Automatic Weapons) (Self-Propelled) due to conversion to M51 Skysweeper. Lineage of unit perpetuated by 249th Artillery 1 April 1959 under Combat Arms Regimental System during Pentomic reorganization.
  - 732nd Antiaircraft Artillery Battalion (1947–1959) – Previously 171st Coast Artillery Battalion (Harbor Defense) and elements of the 249th Coast Artillery Regiment. Redesignated as 965th Field Artillery Battalion 10 July 1946, reorganized and Federally recognized with HQ Klamath Falls 13 November 1947. Redesignated as 732nd Antiaircraft Artillery Gun Battalion (90 mm), a unit originally allocated to Portland but never activated, 1 February 1949; a new 965th activated at Portland. HQ location changed to Ashland 12 May 1949. Reorganized and redesignated 16 July 1951 as 732nd Antiaircraft Artillery Automatic Weapons Battalion, redesignated 1 October 1953 as 732nd Antiaircraft Artillery Battalion (Automatic Weapons) (Self Propelled) due to conversion to M51 Skysweeper. Consolidated into 249th Artillery under Combat Arms Regimental System during Pentomic reorganization 1 April 1959.
- 3670th Ordnance Company – Organized 1947 at Portland, location changed to Camp Withycombe, Clackamas 1948. Redesignated 3670th Maintenance Company 1968, inactivated 2018.
- 110th Signal Company – Salem, became 1210th Transportation Company (Light Truck) 1968.

== Organization ==
As of March 2026 the Oregon Army National Guard consists of the following units:

- Joint Force Headquarters-Oregon, Army Element, in Salem
  - Headquarters and Headquarters Company, Joint Force Headquarters-Oregon, Army Element, in Salem
  - Oregon Recruiting & Retention Battalion, in Salem
  - Oregon Medical Detachment, in Salem
  - 102nd Civil Support Team (WMD), at McNary Airfield
  - Biak Training Center, in Redmond
  - Najaf Training Center, in Corvallis
  - Rees Training Center, in Hermiston
  - Army Aviation Support Facility #1, at McNary Airfield
  - Army Aviation Support Facility #2, at Pendleton Army Airfield
  - Combined Support Maintenance Shop #1, at Camp Withycombe
  - Unit Training Equipment Site #1, in Powell Butte
  - Field Maintenance Shop 1, in Portland
  - Field Maintenance Shop 2, at Camp Withycombe
  - Field Maintenance Shop 3, in Forest Grove
  - Field Maintenance Shop 4, in Salem
  - Field Maintenance Shop 5, in Springfield
  - Field Maintenance Shop 6, in Medford
  - Field Maintenance Shop 7, in La Grande
  - 41st Infantry Brigade Combat Team, at Camp Withycombe
    - Headquarters and Headquarters Company, 41st Infantry Brigade Combat Team, at Camp Withycombe
    - 1st Squadron, 303rd Cavalry Regiment, in Centralia (WA) — (Washington Army National Guard)
    - 2nd Battalion, 162nd Infantry Regiment, in Springfield
      - Headquarters and Headquarters Company, 2nd Battalion, 162nd Infantry Regiment, in Springfield
      - Company A, 2nd Battalion, 162nd Infantry Regiment, in Springfield
      - Company B, 2nd Battalion, 162nd Infantry Regiment, in Corvallis
      - Company C, 2nd Battalion, 162nd Infantry Regiment, in Gresham
      - Company D (Weapons), 2nd Battalion, 162nd Infantry Regiment, at Camp Withycombe
    - 1st Battalion, 186th Infantry Regiment, in Ashland
      - Headquarters and Headquarters Company, 1st Battalion, 186th Infantry Regiment, in Ashland
      - Company A, 1st Battalion, 186th Infantry Regiment, in Medford
        - Detachment 1, Company A, 1st Battalion, 186th Infantry Regiment, at Kingsley Field Air National Guard Base
      - Company B, 1st Battalion, 186th Infantry Regiment, in Salem
      - Company C, 1st Battalion, 186th Infantry Regiment, in Roseburg
        - Detachment 1, Company C, 1st Battalion, 186th Infantry Regiment, in Coos Bay
      - Company D (Weapons), 1st Battalion, 186th Infantry Regiment, in Grants Pass
    - 1st Battalion, 200th Infantry Regiment, in Las Cruces (NM) — (New Mexico Army National Guard)
    - 2nd Battalion, 218th Field Artillery Regiment, in Forest Grove
      - Headquarters and Headquarters Battery, 2nd Battalion, 218th Field Artillery Regiment, in Forest Grove
        - Detachment 1, Headquarters and Headquarters Battery, 2nd Battalion, 218th Field Artillery Regiment, in Salem
        - Detachment 2, Headquarters and Headquarters Battery, 2nd Battalion, 218th Field Artillery Regiment, in Las Cruces (NM) — (New Mexico Army National Guard)
      - Battery A, 2nd Battalion, 218th Field Artillery Regiment, in Portland
      - Battery B, 2nd Battalion, 218th Field Artillery Regiment, in McMinnville
      - Battery C, 2nd Battalion, 218th Field Artillery Regiment, in Portland
    - 741st Brigade Engineer Battalion, at Camp Withycombe
      - Headquarters and Headquarters Company, 741st Brigade Engineer Battalion, at Camp Withycombe
      - Company A (Combat Engineer), 741st Brigade Engineer Battalion, at Camp Withycombe
      - Company B (Combat Engineer), 741st Brigade Engineer Battalion, in St. Helens
      - Company C (Signal), 741st Brigade Engineer Battalion, at Camp Withycombe
      - Company D (Military Intelligence), 741st Brigade Engineer Battalion, at Portland Air National Guard Base
        - Detachment 1, Company D (Military Intelligence), 741st Brigade Engineer Battalion, at Pendleton Field (RQ-28A UAV)
    - 141st Brigade Support Battalion, in Portland
      - Headquarters and Headquarters Company, 141st Brigade Support Battalion, in Portland
      - Company A (Distribution), 141st Brigade Support Battalion, in Portland
      - Company B (Maintenance), 141st Brigade Support Battalion, in Portland
      - Company C (Medical), 141st Brigade Support Battalion, in Portland
      - Company D (Forward Support), 141st Brigade Support Battalion, in Montesano (WA) — attached to 1st Squadron, 303rd Cavalry Regiment (Washington Army National Guard)
      - Company E (Forward Support), 141st Brigade Support Battalion, at Camp Withycombe — attached to 741st Brigade Engineer Battalion
      - Company F (Forward Support), 141st Brigade Support Battalion, in Forest Grove — attached to 2nd Battalion, 218th Field Artillery Regiment
      - Company G (Forward Support), 141st Brigade Support Battalion, in Springfield — attached to 2nd Battalion, 162nd Infantry Regiment
      - Company H (Forward Support), 141st Brigade Support Battalion, in Medford — attached to 1st Battalion, 186th Infantry Regiment
      - Company I (Forward Support), 141st Brigade Support Battalion, in Las Cruces (NM) — attached to 1st Battalion, 200th Infantry Regiment (New Mexico Army National Guard)
  - 82nd Troop Command, at Camp Withycombe
    - Headquarters and Headquarters Company, 82nd Troop Command, at Camp Withycombe
    - 82nd Tactical Support Detachment, at Camp Withycombe
    - 234th Army Band, at Camp Withycombe
    - Detachment 2, Company C, 1st Battalion (Security & Support), 112th Aviation Regiment, at McNary Airfield (UH-72A Lakota)
    - Detachment 1, Company B (Heavy Lift), 1st Battalion (General Support Aviation), 168th Aviation Regiment, at Pendleton Army Airfield (CH-47F Chinook)
      - Detachment 2, Headquarters and Headquarters Company, 1st Battalion (General Support Aviation), 168th Aviation Regiment, at Pendleton Army Airfield
      - Detachment 2, Company D (AVUM), 1st Battalion (General Support Aviation), 168th Aviation Regiment, at Pendleton Army Airfield
      - Detachment 2, Company E (Forward Support), 1st Battalion (General Support Aviation), 168th Aviation Regiment, at Pendleton Army Airfield
    - Company G (MEDEVAC), 1st Battalion, 189th Aviation Regiment, at McNary Airfield (OR) (HH-60M Black Hawk)
      - Detachment 3, Headquarters and Headquarters Company, 1st Battalion (General Support Aviation), 189th Aviation Regiment, at McNary Airfield
      - Detachment 3, Company D (AVUM), 1st Battalion (General Support Aviation), 189th Aviation Regiment, at McNary Airfield
      - Detachment 3, Company E (Forward Support), 1st Battalion (General Support Aviation), 189th Aviation Regiment, at McNary Airfield
    - Detachment 3, Company B (AVIM), 351st Aviation Support Battalion, at Pendleton Army Airfield
    - 1st Squadron, 82nd Cavalry Regiment, in Bend (part of 81st Stryker Brigade Combat Team)
      - Headquarters and Headquarters Troop, 1st Squadron, 82nd Cavalry Regiment, in Bend
      - Troop A, 1st Squadron, 82nd Cavalry Regiment, in Albany
      - Troop B, 1st Squadron, 82nd Cavalry Regiment, in Redmond
      - Troop C, 1st Squadron, 82nd Cavalry Regiment, in Portland
      - Troop D (Weapons), 1st Squadron, 82nd Cavalry Regiment, in The Dalles
      - Company D (Forward Support), 181st Brigade Support Battalion, in Prineville
    - 2rd Battalion, 186th Infantry Regiment (United States), in La Grande (formerly part of 116th Cavalry Brigade Combat Team)
      - Headquarters and Headquarters Company, 2nd Battalion, 186th Infantry Regiment, in La Grande
        - Detachment 1, Headquarters and Headquarters Company, 2md Battalion, 186th Infantry Regiment, in Milton-Freewater
      - Company A (Rifle) , 2nd Battalion, 186th Infantry Regiment, in Ontario
      - Company B (Rifle), 3rd Battalion, 186th Infantry Regiment, in Hermiston
      - Company C (Rifle), 2nd Battalion, 186th Infantry Regiment, in Woodburn
      - Company D (MPC), 2nd Battalion, 186th Infantry Regiment in Oregon
    - 1249th Engineer Battalion, in Salem
      - Headquarters and Headquarters Company, 1249th Engineer Battalion, in Salem
      - Forward Support Company, 1249th Engineer Battalion, in Salem
      - 224th Engineer Company (Engineer Construction Company), in Dallas
          - Detachment 1, 224th Engineer Company (Engineer Construction Company), in Newport
      - 442nd Engineer Detachment (Utilities), at Camp Rilea
    - 2nd Battalion (Fixed Wing), 641st Aviation Regiment, at McNary Airfield (part of 63rd Aviation Brigade)
      - Headquarters and Headquarters Company, 2nd Battalion (Fixed Wing), 641st Aviation Regiment, at McNary Airfield
      - Company A, 2nd Battalion (Fixed Wing), 641st Aviation Regiment (Detachment 47, Operational Support Airlift Activity), at McNary Airfield (C-12 Huron)
      - Company B, 2nd Battalion (Fixed Wing), 641st Aviation Regiment, at Hawkins Field (airport) (MS) — (Mississippi Army National Guard)
      - Company C, 2nd Battalion (Fixed Wing), 641st Aviation Regiment, at Joint Base Elmendorf–Richardson (AK) — (Alaska Army National Guard)
    - 821st Troop Command Battalion, in Salem
      - Headquarters and Headquarters Company, 821st Troop Command Battalion, in Salem
      - 115th Mobile Public Affairs Detachment, in Salem
      - 1186th Military Police Company, in Salem
        - Detachment 1, 1186th Military Police Company, in Hood River
  - 249th Regiment, Regional Training Institute, in Hermiston

Aviation unit abbreviations: MEDEVAC — Medical evacuation; AVUM — Aviation Unit Maintenance; AVIM — Aviation Intermediate Maintenance

== In popular culture ==
- Shepherds of Helmand

== See also ==
- Oregon Civil Defense Force
