= Camp Withycombe =

United States National Guard training facility

Coordinates: 45.413042°N 122.55416°W

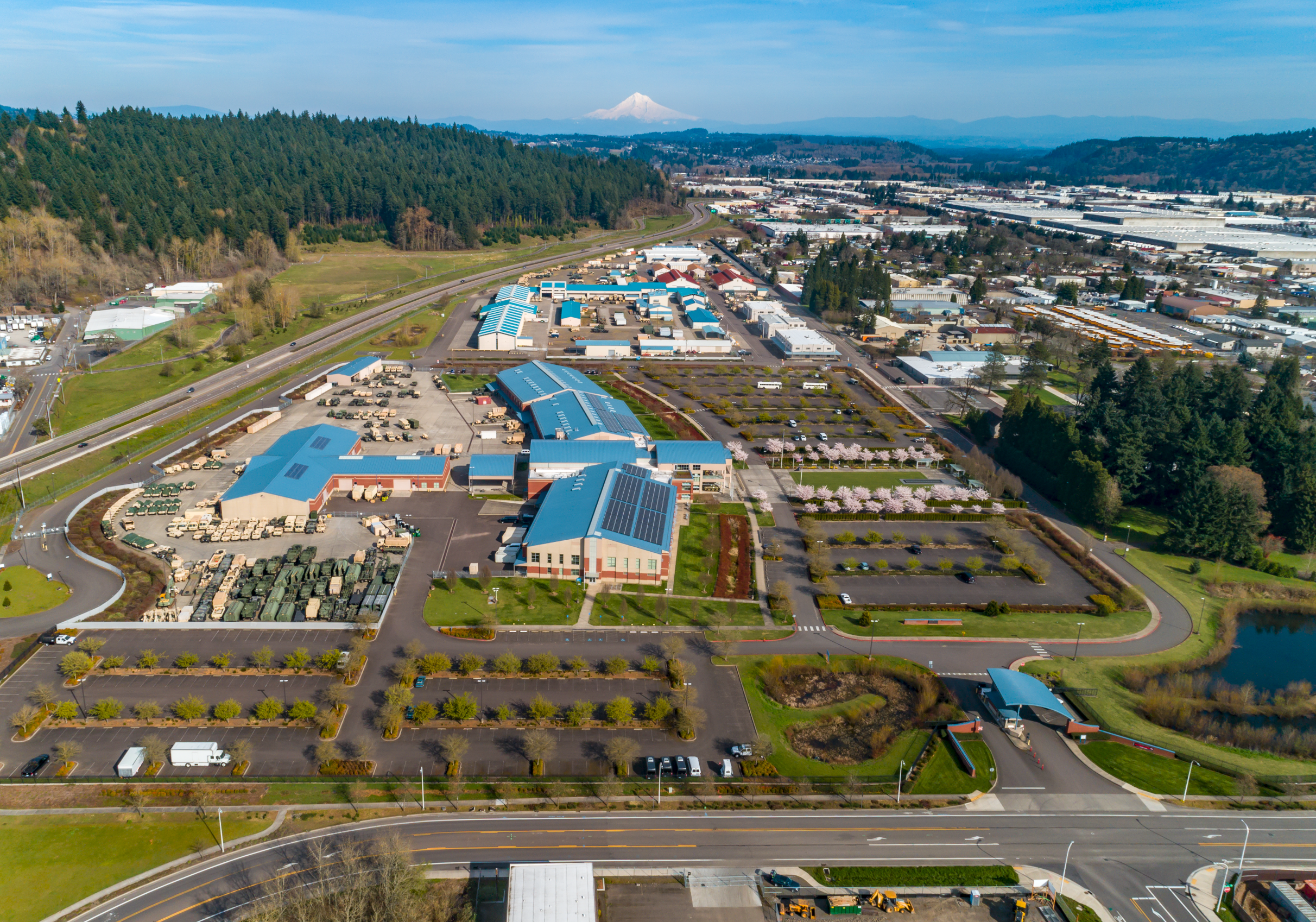
Aerial Overview of Camp Withycombe

Camp Withycombe, located in Clackamas County, Oregon, United States, was originally established as Camp Benson after Governor Frank W. Benson, but was later renamed Camp Withycombe during World War I for Governor James Withycombe.

Originally known as the Clackamas Rifle Range, it was established as a training camp in 1909 and expanded during World War I, during which it served as a headquarters for the National Guard, a central supply depot and training center. Pendleton, Oregon photographer Walter S. Bowman photographed Camp Benson in the early 20th century.

In the 1930s, the camp became a supply depot. Some of the buildings on the camp property, such as the Adjutant General's house (1938), were built by the Works Progress Administration (WPA).

The camp still serves as a training facility, supply depot, and equipment repair facility for the National Guard, but the rifle range is now closed.

== Site overview ==
Camp Withycombe is state land under the responsibility of the Oregon Military Department (OMD), a state agency, and is home to several Oregon Army National Guard (ORARNG) military units under the jurisdiction of federal and state military authorities.

Camp Withycombe is a 77+-acre site that is located at the foot of Mount Talbert southeast of Portland. The site contains historic military structures and has had a military armory on site since 1956. The site also contains maintenance, logistics and warehousing functions in support of military missions throughout the state. The site's armory/readiness training center functions have been identified for upgrade/replacement to house the corporate headquarters of the 41st Brigade as well as joint forces in a new Armed Forces Readiness Center for realigned units from closing United States Army Reserve (USAR) installations in the region.

== General history ==
Throughout its history, Camp Withycombe has been used as a rifle range, mobilization camp, and supply depot, and many agencies have been involved in its ownership and management. Camp Withycombe was originally known as the Clackamas Firing Range and consisted of 100 acres, purchased in 1910. By 1915, the federal government purchased seven additional parcels it had been leasing, increasing the facility's size to 234 acres. By 1934, the facility's role as a military supply warehouse and disbursement center expanded and the Clackamas Firing Range was designated a federal military reservation and named Camp Withycombe, after former Oregon governor, James Withycombe.

Camp Withycombe served as a mobilization point for the ORARNG for federal service throughout World War I and II and other federal operations. Throughout World War II, the site was used as a United States (U.S.) Army barracks and its firing ranges received extensive use by the U.S. Army, the U.S. Marine Corps, the Federal Bureau of Investigation, police, and civilians (AMEC, 2009). In addition to uses for training, Camp Withycombe served as a supply depot. In 1949, additional facilities were built in support of the camp's supply function and role as an ordnance center.

The Department of Defense (DoD) conveyed Camp Withycombe to the OMD in 1956 through a quitclaim deed that required the property continue to be used for military purposes only, or it would be reverted to the U.S. government. Eventually, OMD transferred ownership of 156 acres of the property to ODOT for inclusion in the proposed Sunset Corridor right-of-way. Under a lease agreement with ODOT, OMD maintains administrative control over the entire property. The Department of Army released reversionary interest in the 156-acre ODOT portion of the property through the U.S. Congress in 1989. The Department of Army maintains reversionary interest in the remaining OMD Property.

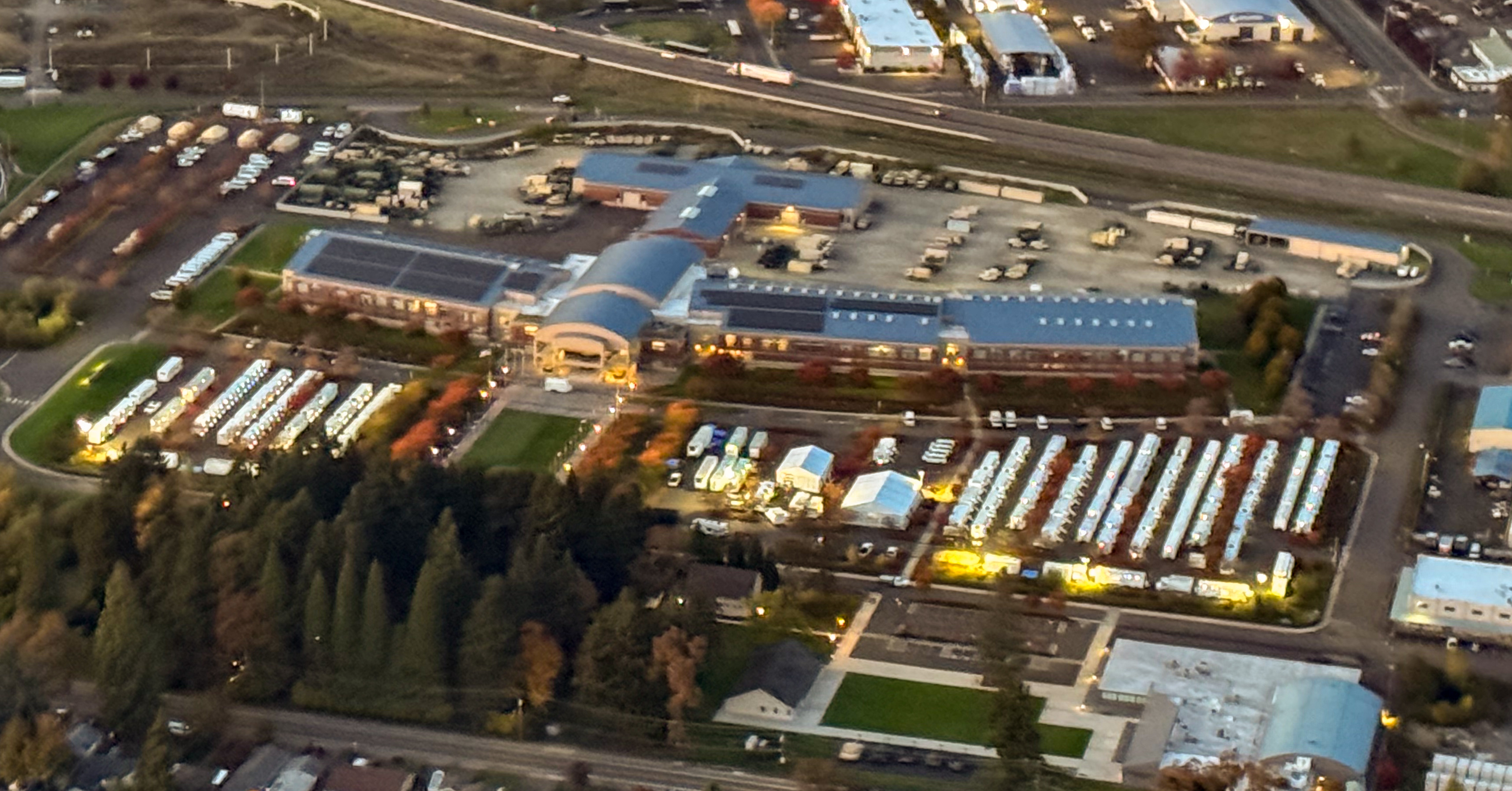
Aerial photo of Camp Withycombe with California National Guard on site in white trailers during 2025 Portland, Oregon, protests

== Oregon Military Museum ==
The Oregon Military Museum is located within Camp Withycombe.
