= 641st Aviation Regiment =

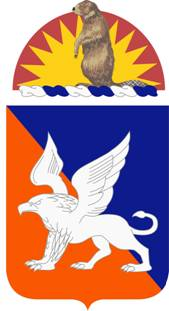
- coat of arms
- Country: USA
- Branch: United States Army Aviation Branch
- Type: Aviation

Insignia
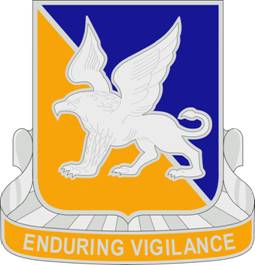
- Distinctive Unit Insignia

The 641st Aviation Regiment is an aviation regiment of the U.S. Army.

== Organization ==
- 2nd Battalion (Fixed Wing)
  - Headquarters and Headquarters Company, at McNary Airfield (Oregon Army National Guard)
  - Company A (former Det. 47 OSACOM; flying a C-12 Huron), at McNary Field (Oregon Army National Guard)
    - Detachment 1 (former Det. 43 OSACOM; flying a C-12 Huron), at Lincoln Airport (Nebraska Army National Guard)
    - Detachment 2 (former Det. 21 OSACOM; flying a C-26E Metroliner), at Rickenbacker International Airport (Ohio Army National Guard)
    - Detachment 3 (former Det. 14 OSACOM; flying a C-12 Huron), at Bangor International Airport (Maine Army National Guard)
    - Detachment 4 (former Det. 31 OSACOM; flying a C-12 Huron), at Goldwater Air National Guard Base (Arizona Army National Guard)
    - Detachment 5 (former Det. 36 OSACOM; flying a C-26E Metroliner), at Dane County Regional Airport (Wisconsin Army National Guard)
    - Detachment 6 (former Det. 25 OSACOM; flying a C-12 Huron), at Smyrna Airport (Tennessee Army National Guard)
    - Detachment 7 (former Det. 38 OSACOM; flying a C-12 Huron), at Hammond Northshore Regional Airport (Louisiana Army National Guard)
  - Company B (former Det. 16 OSACOM; flying a C-12 Huron), at Hawkins Field (airport) (Mississippi Army National Guard)
    - Detachment 1 (former Det. 22 OSACOM; flying a C-12 Huron), at Muir Army Airfield (Pennsylvania Army National Guard)
    - Detachment 2 (former Det. 6 OSACOM; flying a C-12 Huron), at Bradley International Airport (Connecticut Army National Guard)
    - Detachment 3 (former Det. 45 OSACOM; flying a C-12 Huron), at Reno Stead Airport (Nevada Army National Guard)
    - Detachment 4 (former Det. 5 OSACOM; flying a C-12 Huron), at Montgomery Regional Airport (Alabama Army National Guard)
    - Detachment 5 (former Det. 24 OSACOM; flying a C-26E Metroliner), at McEntire Joint National Guard Base (South Carolina Army National Guard)
    - Detachment 6 (former Det. 34 OSACOM; flying a C-12 Huron), at Des Moines International Airport (Iowa Army National Guard)
    - Detachment 7 (former Det. 49 OSACOM; flying a C-12 Huron), at Austin–Bergstrom International Airport (Texas Army National Guard)
  - Company C (former Det. 54 OSACOM; flying a C-12 Huron), at Elmendorf Air Force Base (Alaska Army National Guard)
    - Detachment 1 (former Det. 37 OSACOM; flying a C-12 Huron), at Forbes Field (airport) (Kansas Army National Guard))
    - Detachment 2 (former Det. 13 OSACOM; flying a C-12 Huron), at Phillips Army Airfield (Maryland Army National Guard)
    - Detachment 3 (former Det. 55 OSACOM; flying a C-26E Metroliner), at Wheeler Army Airfield (Hawaii Army National Guard)
    - Detachment 4 (former Det. 50 OSACOM; flying a C-12 Huron), at Roland R. Wright Air National Guard Base (Utah Army National Guard)
    - Detachment 5 (former Det. 48 OSACOM; flying a C-12 Huron), at Rapid City Regional Airport (South Dakota Army National Guard)
    - Detachment 6 (former Det. 4 OSACOM; flying a C-26E Metroliner), at Davison Army Airfield, Virginia (District of Columbia Army National Guard)
    - Detachment 7 (former Det. 56 OSACOM; flying a C-12 Huron), at Isla Grande Airport (Puerto Rico Army National Guard)
