= Oregon Military Department =

U.S. state of Oregon government agency

New 2024 Seal for the Oregon National Guard / Military Department

The Oregon Military Department is an agency of the government of the U.S. state of Oregon, which oversees the armed forces of the state of Oregon. Under the authority and direction of the governor as commander-in-chief, the agency is responsible for planning, establishing, and enforcing rules and procedures governing the administration, supply, and training of the Oregon National Guard (consisting of the Oregon Army National Guard and the Oregon Air National Guard), when not in the active service of the United States. The department also maintains all state-owned or leased military facilities, including posts, camps, military reservations, and rifle ranges.

== Staff ==
The adjutant general serves as the administrative director of the Military Department and is the military command officer of the national guard. The Military Council, composed of the adjutant general and six to ten officers of the National Guard, operates as an advisory staff to the governor, in much the same way as the Joint Chiefs of Staff advise the president. The Army and Air wings of the National Guard have proportional representation on the council according to their current total strength.

== Structure ==
The Oregon Military Department is split into the Oregon Army National Guard and the Oregon Air National Guard. The structure of units is listed below.

The Adjutant General and Command Staff, Salem, Oregon

State Agency Directory: Military Department

=== Oregon Army National Guard ===
- Land Component Command and General Staff, Salem, Oregon
- Headquarters and Headquarters Detachment (HHD) Salem, Oregon
- Recruiting and Retention Command, Salem, Oregon
- Medical Command, Salem, Oregon
- Regional Training Institute (RTI), Rees Training Center and Warrenton, Oregon
- Oregon Training Command, Warrenton, Adair, Biak, and Rees Training Center
- The 41st Infantry Brigade Combat Team (United States) formerly The 41st Infantry Division (United States). The 41 IBCT is headquartered at Camp Withycombe, in Clackamas, Oregon.
  - 2nd Battalion, 162nd Infantry Regiment
    - Headquarters and Headquarters Company Springfield
    - Company A, Springfield
    - Company B, Corvallis
    - Company C, Gresham
    - Company D, Hillsboro
    - G Forward Support Company, 141st Brigade Support Battalion, Springfield
  - 1st Battalion, 186th Infantry Regiment
    - Headquarters and Headquarters Company Ashland
    - Company A, Medford
    - Company B, Klamath Falls
    - Company C, Roseburg
      - Detachment 1, Coos Bay
    - Company D, Grants Pass
    - H Forward Support Company, 141st Brigade Support Battalion, Medford
  - 1st Battalion, 200th Infantry Regiment (New Mexico Army National Guard) (Las Cruces, New Mexico)
    - Headquarters and Headquarters Company (Las Cruces)
    - Company A, Rio Rancho
    - Company B, Rio Rancho
    - Company C, Las Cruces
      - Detachment 1, Rio Rancho
    - Company D, Alamogordo
    - 613th Forward Support Company, Las Cruces
  - 1st Squadron, 303rd Cavalry Regiment Headquartered in Washington
    - Headquarters and Headquarters Troop Vancouver
    - Troop A, Puyallup
    - Troop B, Pasco
    - Troop C, Centralia
    - D Forward Support Company, 141st Brigade Support Battalion, Centralia
  - 2nd Battalion, 218th Field Artillery Regiment
    - Headquarters and Headquarters Battery Forest Grove
    - Battery A, Portland
    - Battery B, McMinnville
    - Battery C, Portland
    - F Forward Support Company, 141st Brigade Support Battalion, Forest Grove
  - 741st Brigade Engineer Battalion
    - Headquarters and Headquarters Company, Clackamas, Oregon
    - Company A (Engineering), Clackamas
    - Company B (Engineering), St. Helens
    - Company C (Signal), Clackamas
    - Company D (Military Intelligence), Clackamas
    - E Forward Support Company, 141st Brigade Support Battalion, Clackamas
  - 141st Brigade Support Battalion
    - Headquarters and Headquarters Company Portland
    - Company A, Portland
    - Company B (Ordnance), Portland
    - Company C (Medical), Portland
- The 82nd Troop Command Brigade, Clackamas, Oregon
  - HHD 82 Troop Command Brigade, Clackamas, Oregon
  - 82 Tactical Support Detachment, Clackamas, Oregon
  - 821 Troop Command Battalion, Salem, Oregon
    - Headquarters and Headquarters Detachment, 821 Troop Command Battalion
    - 1186 Military Police Company
    - 115th Mobile Public Affairs Detachment (MPAD) Salem, Oregon
    - 234 Army Band
    - 1942 Acquisition Team
  - 2-641 Aviation 641st Aviation Regiment (United States), Salem, Oregon
    - Headquarters and Headquarters Company (HHC) 2-641 Aviation
    - G/1-189 Aviation
    - 1/A/1-112 Aviation
    - 1/B/1-168 Aviation
    - A(-) 641 Aviation
    - 3/B/351 Aviation
    - Detachment 47 Operational Support Aircraft
    - 1/D/741 Brigade Engineer Battalion
  - 1249 Engineer Battalion, Salem, Oregon
    - Headquarters and Headquarters Company (HHC) 1249 Engineers
    - A Forward Support Company (FSC) 1249 Engineer
    - 224 Engineers (-) (Construction)
    - 442 Engineers (Construction)
  - 3-116 Cavalry Regiment, 116th Cavalry Brigade Combat Team
    - Headquarters and Headquarters Company (HHC) 3 Combined Arms Battalion - 116 Cavalry Regiment, in La Grande, Oregon
    - A (Tank)/3-116 Cavalry, Ontario, Oregon
    - B (Tank)/3-116 Cavalry, Hermiston, Oregon
    - C (Rifle)(-)/3-116 Cavalry, Woodburn, Oregon
      - Detachment 1 3/C(Rifle)/3-116 Cavalry, Pendleton, Oregon
    - D (Tank)/3-116 Cavalry - Disbanded
    - F(-) 145 Brigade Support Battalion, Baker City, Oregon
  - 1-82 Cavalry Squadron
    - Headquarters and Headquarters Troop (HHT) 1-82 Cavalry
    - A Troop 1-82 Cavalry, Albany, Oregon
    - B Troop 1-82 Cavalry, Redmond, Oregon
    - C Troop 1-82 Cavalry, Portland, Oregon
    - D Troop 1-82 Cavalry, The Dalles, Oregon
    - D Company 181 Brigade Support Battalion, Prineville, Oregon

=== Oregon Air National Guard ===
- Air Component Command and General Staff, Salem, Oregon
- 173rd Fighter Wing, Klamath Falls, Oregon
  - 173rd Operations Group
  - 114th Fighter Squadron
  - 270th Air Traffic Control Squadron
  - 173rd Maintenance Group
  - 173rd Mission Support Group
  - 173rd Medical Group
- 142nd Wing, Portland, Oregon
  - 142nd Operations Group
  - 116th Air Control Squadron, Camp Rilea AFTC, Warrenton, Oregon
  - 123rd Fighter Squadron
  - 125th Special Tactics Squadron
  - 123rd Weather Flight
  - 142nd Security Forces Squadron
  - 142nd Maintenance Group
  - 142nd Mission Support Group
  - 142nd Medical Group

== Funding ==
Approximately 97 percent (US$382 million) of the funds for the Oregon National Guard are provided by the federal government. This does not reflect the considerably smaller figure of $35.9 million or 9% which is included within the Department's budget. The difference can be accounted for by the fact that troop salaries and wages are paid to them directly by the federal government. Federal funds support 100% of troop training, Defense Department programs, base security and fire protection, and youth programs; 75% of the logistical support for training sites; and most facility, maintenance and supply expenditures of the Air National Guard (averaging 75 to 85% based on a complex and variable schedule).

== Role ==
Oregon National Guardsmen simulating the evacuation of a casualty during a training exercise

The National Guard is the only statewide civil defense organization of significant size and provides emergency assistance. In the event of a federal call-up of the National Guard sufficient that it cannot fulfill its state role, domestic deployment of the reserve can be ordered. Since 1989 the Oregon National Guard Reserve (ORNGR) is known officially as the Oregon Civil Defense Force (ORCDF). The ORCDF is an all-volunteer militia force under the Oregon Military Department that provides reserve personnel to both the Oregon Army National Guard and the Oregon Air National Guard. It is under state jurisdiction and its members are employed only within the State of Oregon. It is not subject to any federal orders. Its mission is to provide units organized, equipped and trained in the protection of life or property and the preservation of peace, order and public safety under competent orders of State authorities.

As of just before the 10th anniversary of the September 11 terror attacks, 9,268 Oregon National Guard members had been deployed to Afghanistan (1,691), Iraq (7,048), and the Iraq Southern No Fly Zone (529) since 2002; 20 have been killed in action.

In April 2015, the Oregon Military Department suspended the Oregon State Defense Force. A spokesman for the OMD stated that the suspension was temporary and the ORSDF would return to active service. In December 2019, the ORSDF was reactivated under its current name: the Oregon Civil Defense Force.

== Facilities ==
The Military Department is based in Salem, with armories, camps, air bases and other facilities around the state. The Salem Armory Auditorium next to the Oregon State Fairgrounds in Salem is rented out as a concert venue, and for shows, conventions, graduations, dances and conferences.

== See also ==
- Air National Guard
- Camp Adair
- Camp Rilea Armed Forces Training Center
- Camp Withycombe
- U.S. National Guard
- Shepherds of Helmand
- Biak Training Center
- Rees Training Center

== Directors/Commanders ==
Oregon National Guard

- Brigadier General Alan R. Gronewold 2023-Current
- Major General Michael E. Stencel 2015 - 2023
- Major General Daniel R. Hokanson 2013 - 2015
- Major General Raymond F. Rees 2005 - 2013
- Brigadier General Raymond C. Byrne 2003 - 2005 (Acting)
- Major General Alexander H. Burgin 1999 - 2003
- Major General Raymond F. Rees 1994 - 1999
- Major General Gene A. Katke 1991 - 1994
- Major General Raymond F. Rees 1987 - 1991
- Major General Richard A. Miller 1973 -1987
- Major General Donald N. Anderson 1963-1973
- Major General Paul L. Kliever 1962 - 1963
- Major General Alfred E. Hintz 1959 - 1962
- Major General Thomas A. Rilea 1947 - 1959
- Brigadier General Raymond F. Olson 1944 - 1946 (Acting)
- Colonel Elmer V. Wooten 1941 - 1944 (Acting)
- Major General George A. White 1920 - 1941

Unified Oregon Militia/Oregon National Guard Era 1887-1920

- Conrad Stafrin 9 June 1919 - 15 Apr 1920
- Charles F. Beebe 1 Sep 1918 - 31 Mar 1919
- George A. White 1 Feb 1915
- William E Finzer 1 Sep 1903
- Calvin U. Gantenbein 1 Nov 1899
- Benjamin B. Tuttle 1 Apr 1895
- Robert W. Mitchell 12 Oct 1891
- James C. Shofner 30 Apr 1887

Oregon Community Militia Era 1847-1886

- George Williams 11 Mar 1886
- Rocky P. Earhart 10 Sep 1885
- Lyman S. Scott 24 May 1883
- Edward C. Cahalin 18 Nov 1878
- John Adair 1 Aug 1874
- Ami P. Dennison 15 Sep 1870
- Cyprus A. Reed 13 Nov 1862
- Eli M. Barnum 18 Apr 1854
- Asa L Lovejoy 27 December 1847
