= Camp Rilea =

Oregon Military Department base in the US

- Near Warrenton, Oregon in the United States
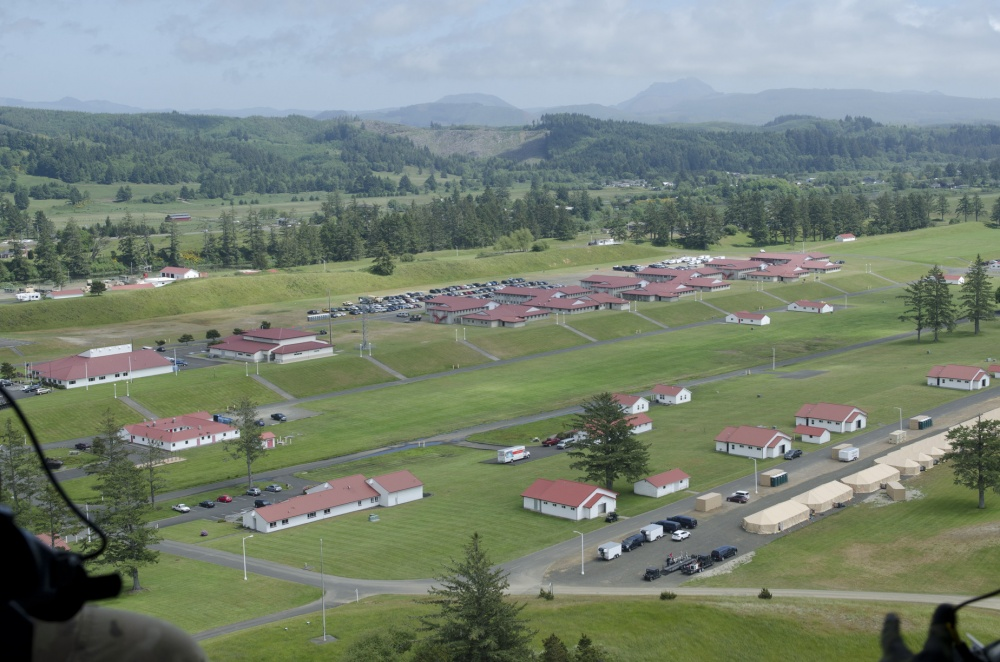

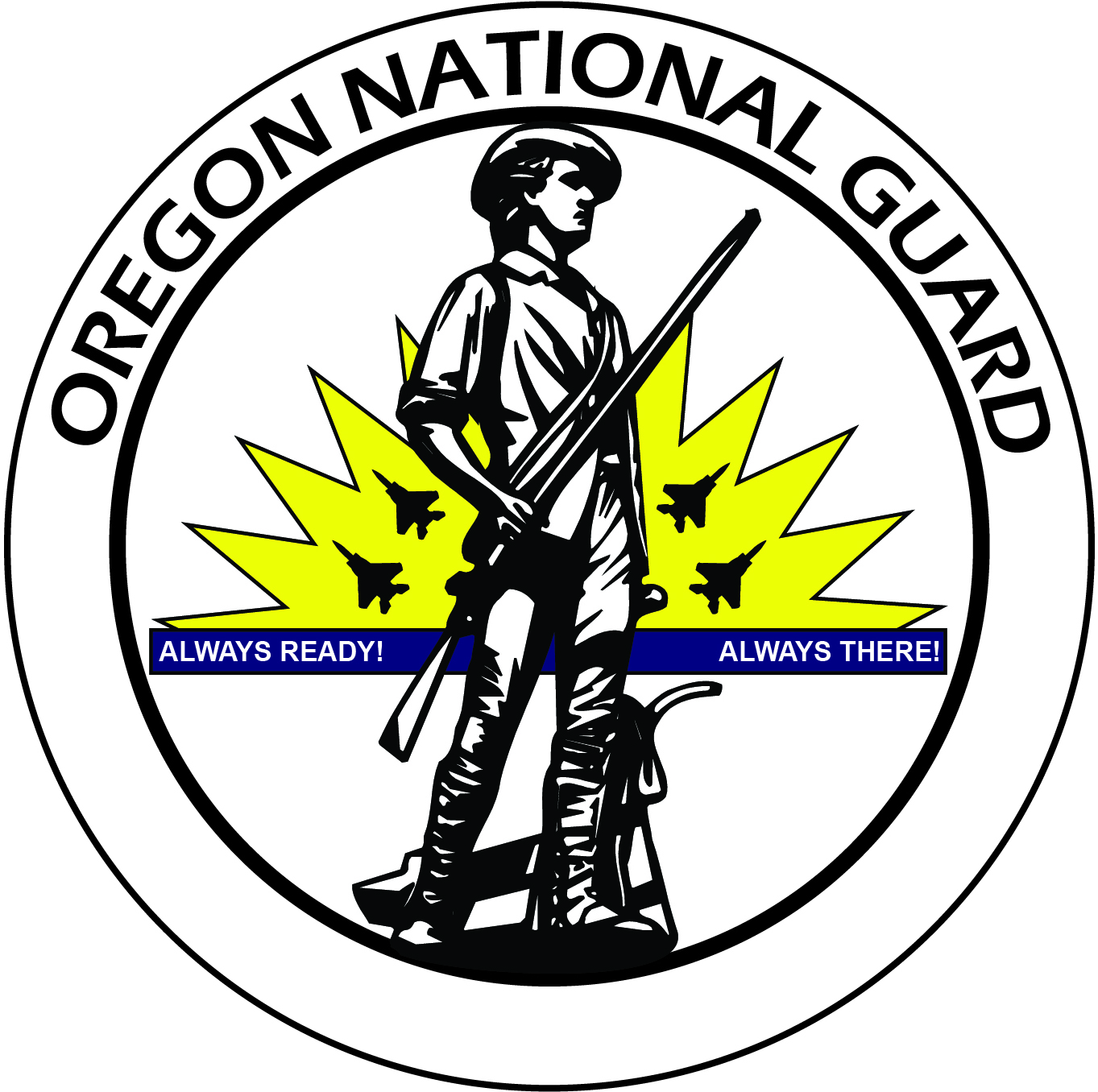

Site information
- Type: Joint Air Force and Army National Guard Base
- Owner: Oregon Military Department
- Controlled by: Oregon Air National Guard; Oregon Army National Guard
- Condition: Operational
- Website: www.oregon.gov/omd/rilea/pages/camp-rilea.aspx

Location
- Location in the United States
- Coordinates: 46°07′44″N 123°56′37″W

Site history
- Built: 1927 (as Camp Clatsop)
- In use: 1927–present

Garrison information
- Garrison: 116th Air Control Squadron

Airfield information
- Identifiers: IATA: none, ICAO: none, FAA LID: 15OR
- Elevation: 22.5 metres (74 ft) AMSL
Helipads
Number	Length and surface
H1	18 metres (59 ft)

Camp Rilea Armed Forces Training Center is an Oregon Military Department base. It dates to 1927 when it was known as Camp Clatsop. It is located on the Oregon Coast in Warrenton and is primarily used by the United States Air Force and the United States Army. It is also home to Camp Rilea Heliport.

== Overview ==
The base is home to the 116th Air Control Squadron. The 116th ACS is a deployable airspace command & control unit with radar and communications capabilities. They have been deployed temporarily to Operation Enduring Freedom in 2006, Qatar in 2011, and Southwest Asia in 2015.

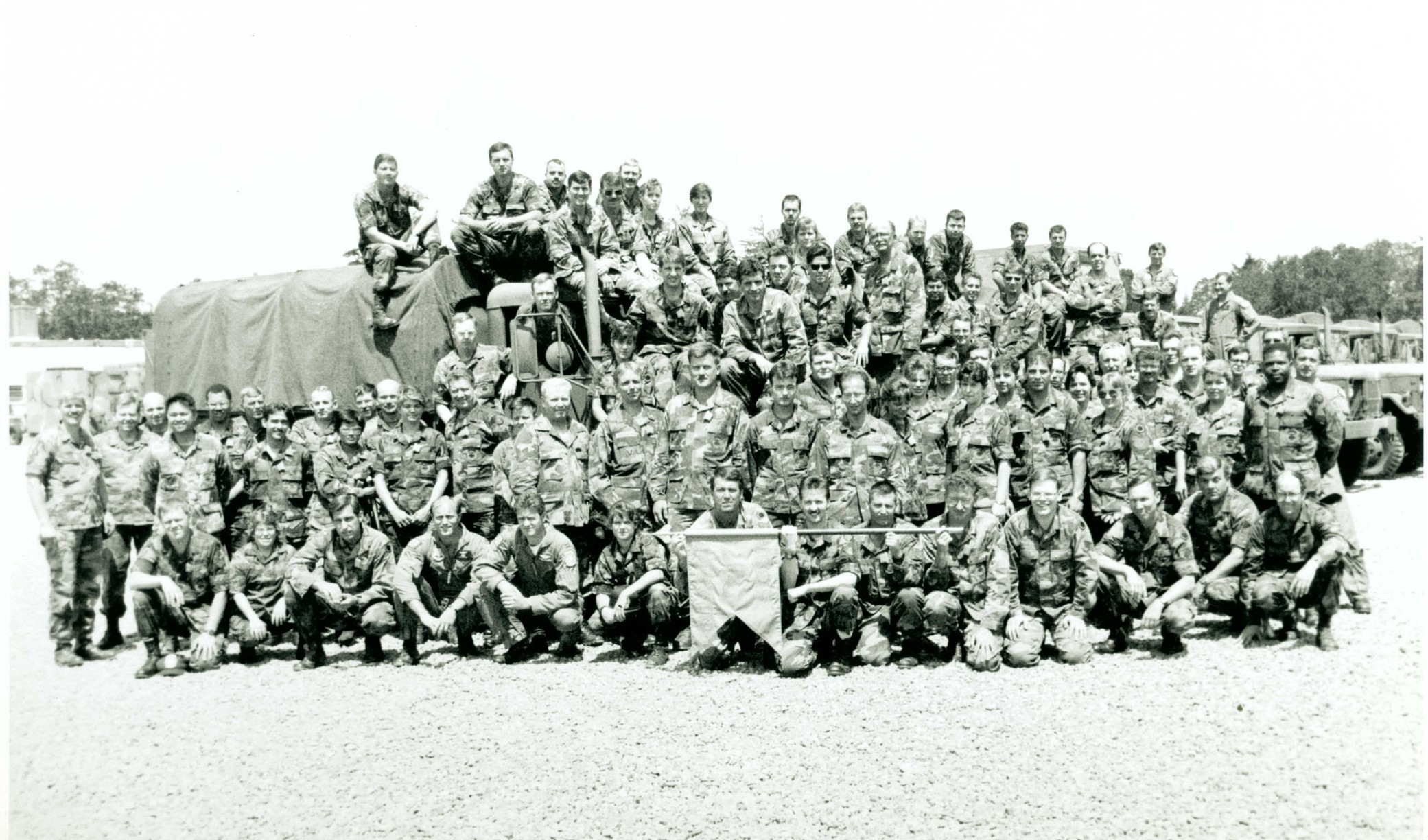
Members of the Washington National Guard's 111th Air Support Operations Squadron training at Camp Rilea in 1990

Additionally, Camp Rilea hosts soldiers from other units of both the Oregon Air National Guard and the Oregon Army National Guard, as well as personnel from Joint Base Lewis–McChord, for various training exercises.

Camp Rilea is used for training by local law enforcement and SWAT teams, Civil Air Patrol, and the Boy Scouts of America.

Camp Rilea is home to a MOUT site, a mock city used for urban warfare training. It is also home to campgrounds available to members of the armed forces as well as a Starbase, a Department of Defense Education Activity program.

Also, Camp Rilea is home to the three-course challenge, a cross-country meet with a unique difficulty-based course instead of the typical varsity, junior varsity, and frosh heat system.

== History ==
The camp was initially established as Camp Clatsop in 1927 as a summer training area for the Oregon National Guard. In 1959, it was renamed Camp Rilea, after Major general Thomas E. Rilea, the Adjutant General of Oregon.

In 1940, the camp was federalized for World War II. It was returned to the state in 1947.

== Gallery ==
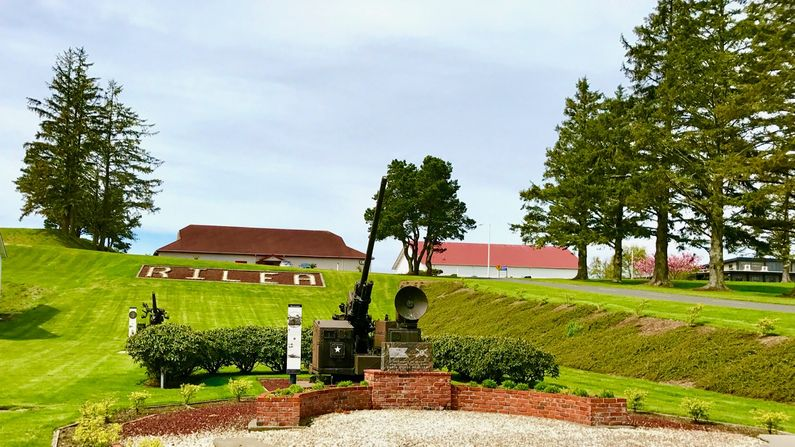

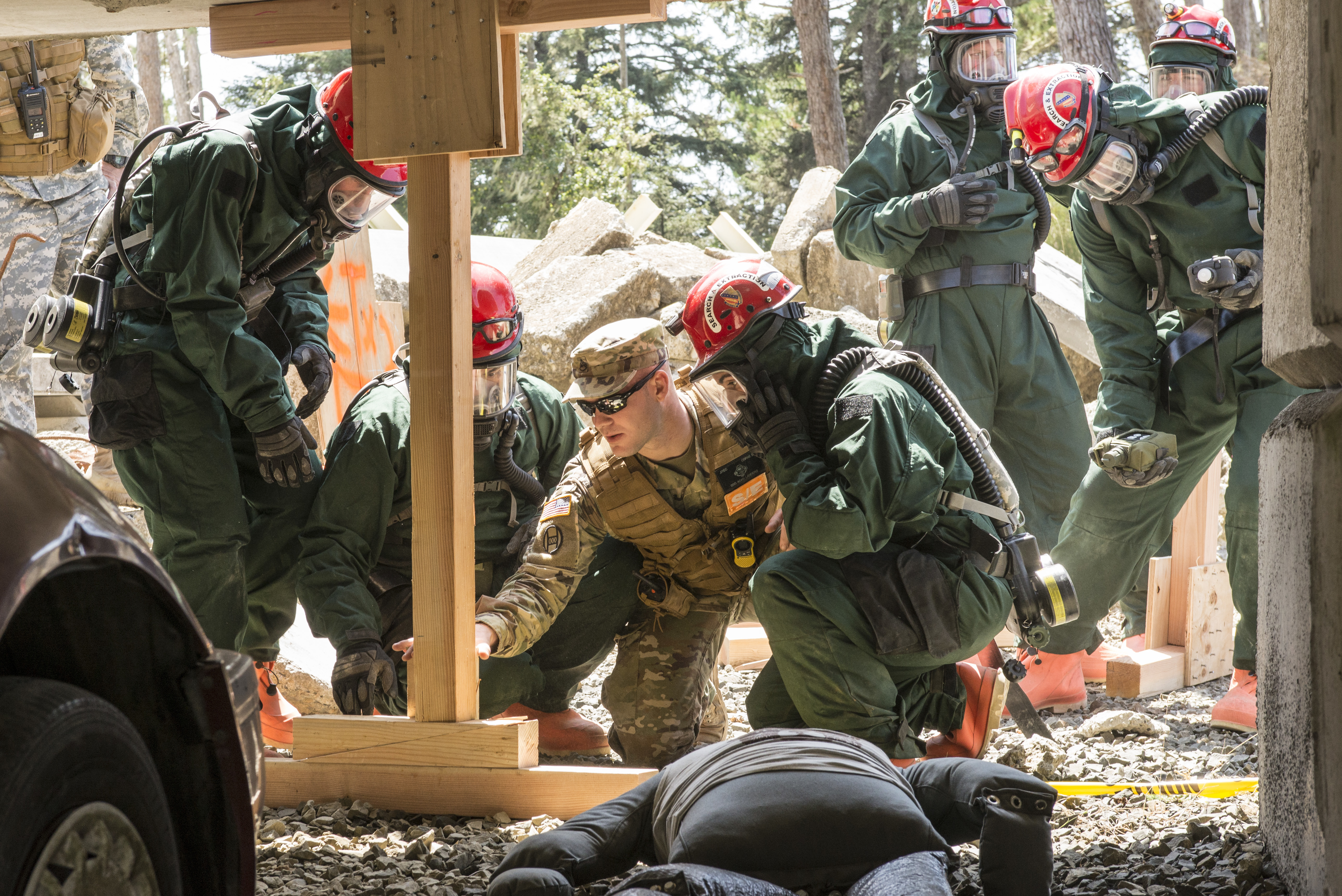
Soldiers participating in a disaster drill

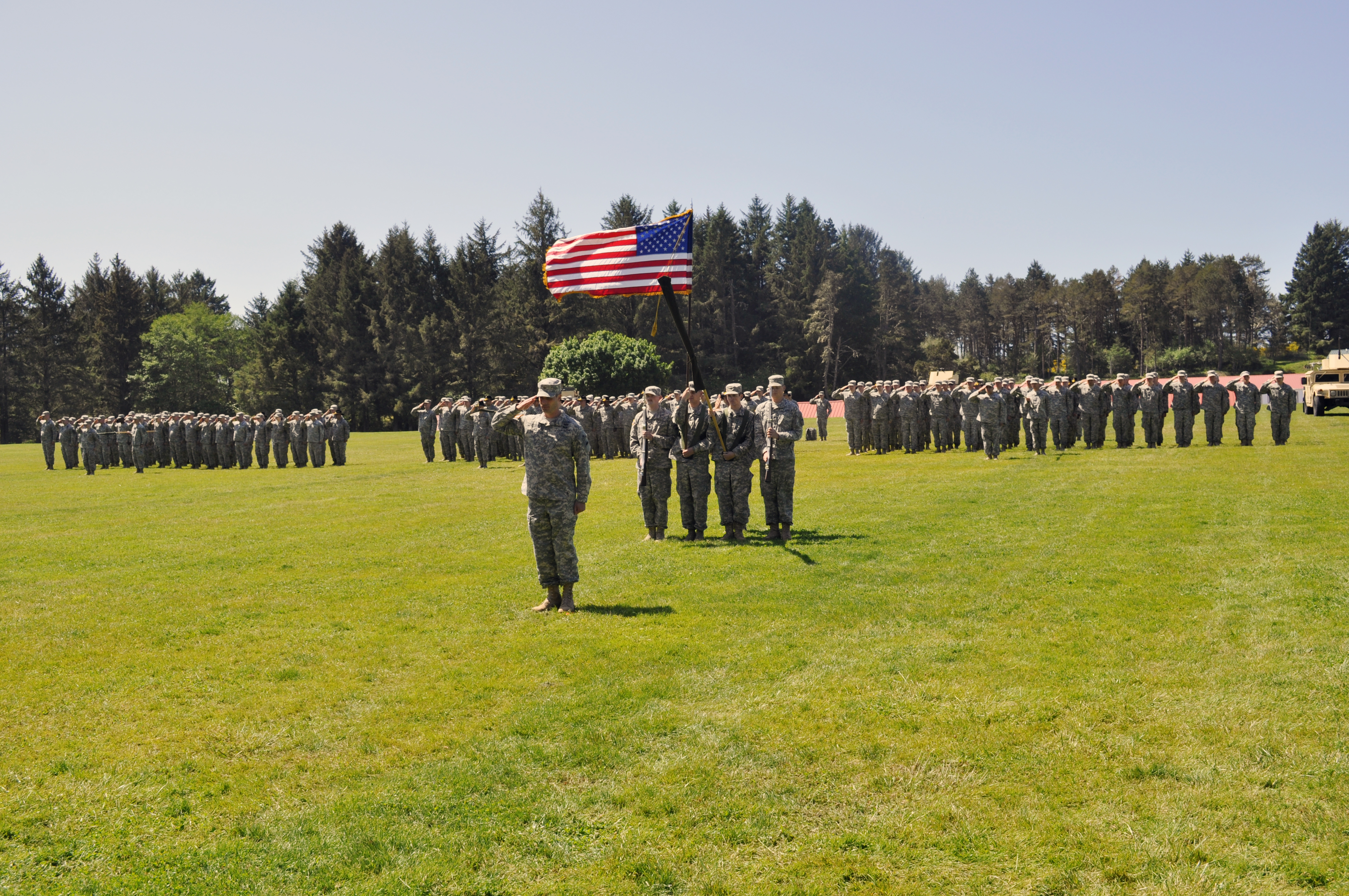

== See also ==
- Camp Rilea Heliport, the heliport located at the camp.
