= Michael E. Stencel =

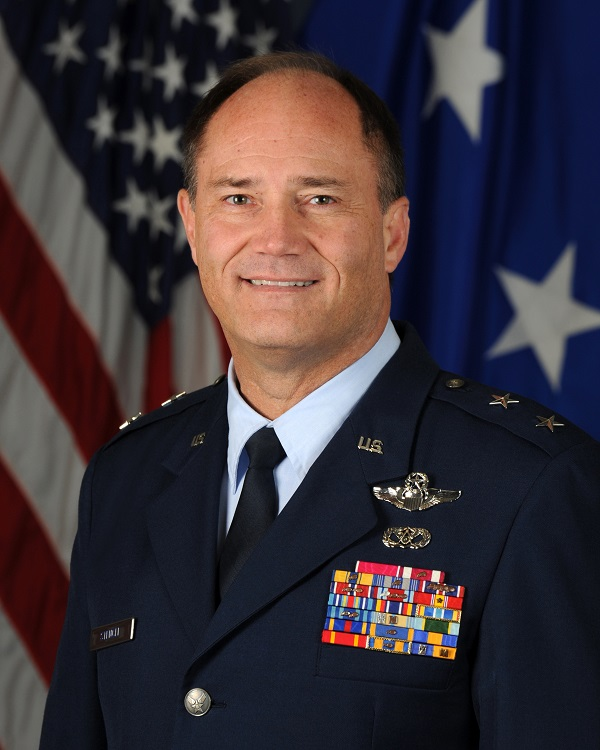
- Oregon National Guard Adjutant General, 2015
- Military career
- Allegiance: United States
- Branch: United States Air Force
- Service years: 1984–present
- Rank: Major general
- Unit: 142nd Fighter Wing
- Commands: Oregon National Guard
- Awards: Legion of Merit (2)

Michael E. Stencel was the 31st Adjutant General of the Oregon National Guard. As a Major General, he commanded over 8,100 soldiers and airmen. He is a command pilot with over 1,900 hours flying training and fighter aircraft.

== Oregon National Guard Adjutant General ==
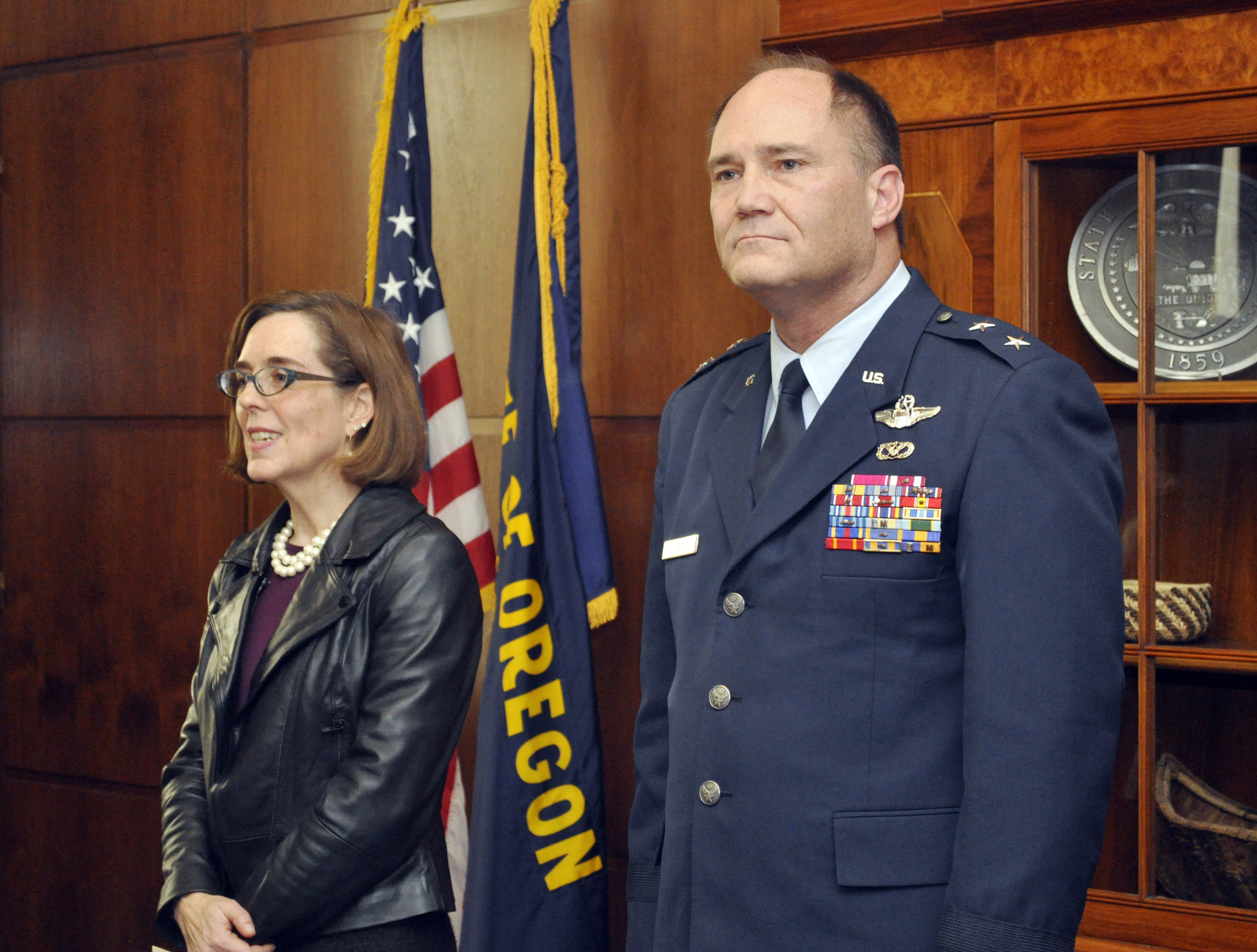
Governor Kate Brown and Major General Michael Stencel.

Governor Kate Brown appointed Brigadier General Stencel to the position of Adjutant General of the Oregon National Guard, Oregon's top military leader, in September 2015. In November of that year, he was promoted to Major General. As Adjutant General, his command includes over 6,100 Army and 2,200 Air National Guard service members, is responsible for the administration of the Oregon National Guard, the Oregon State Defense Force, and the Office of Oregon Emergency Management and serves as the governor's homeland security adviser. He also collaborates with the state's governor and legislature to develop and coordinate programs, plans and policies of the Oregon National Guard.

In October 2015, Stencel went to Vietnam as part of the U.S. Agency for International Development's Overseas Humanitarian Disaster Assistance and Civic Action Program in the Quang Nam Province of Vietnam. Serving as the senior U.S. representative, he cut a ribbon at the grand opening of an intermediate school cooperatively built by the U.S. and Vietnam, which will also be a natural disaster shelter.

== Education ==
=== Civilian education ===
Stencel earned two bachelor's degrees, both at the University of Washington: a Bachelor of Science in civil engineering in 1983, and a Bachelor of Arts in political science in 1991. He earned a Master of Business Administration in 1995 at Portland State University.

=== Military education ===
Stencel earned his pilot's wings after training at Columbus Air Force Base in Mississippi from December 1984 to November 1985. In 1987, he trained at the Squadron Officer School at Maxwell Air Force Base, and in 1993, he completed the aircraft mishap investigation course at Kirtland Air Force Base. In 2001, Stencel completed the air base combat engineering course at Wright-Patterson Air Force Base.

Stencel's command background education included training at Air Command & Staff College at Maxwell Air Force Base in 2000; United States Northern Command, Joint Task Force Commander Training Course and Dual Status Commander Training Qualification Program at Peterson Air Force Base in 2012–2013.

== Rating and awards ==
Stencel holds a command pilot rating and has over 1,900 flight hours in military aircraft. He has flown the Cessna T-37 Tweet, Northrop T-38 Talon, the McDonnell Douglas F-4 Phantom II, and McDonnell Douglas F-15 Eagle models A, B, C, and D.

US Air Force Command Pilot Badge
Air Force Basic Civil Engineer Badge

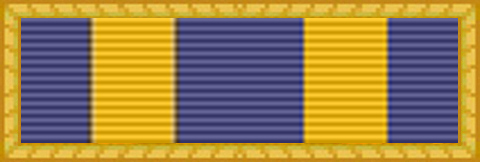
Legion of Merit with one bronze oak leaf cluster
Meritorious Service Medal with oak leaf cluster
Air Force Commendation Medal with oak leaf cluster
Air Force Achievement Medal with oak leaf cluster
Air Force Outstanding Unit Award with five oak leaf clusters
Air Force Organizational Excellence Award with two oak leaf clusters
Combat Readiness Medal with silver and two bronze oak leaf clusters
National Defense Service Medal with one bronze service star
Global War on Terrorism Expeditionary Medal
Global War on Terrorism Service Medal
Air Force Expeditionary Service Ribbon with gold frame
Air Force Longevity Service Award with silver and two bronze oak leaf clusters
Armed Forces Reserve Medal with silver Hourglass device and "M" device
Small Arms Expert Marksmanship Ribbon
Air Force Training Ribbon
Oregon Exceptional Service Medal with oak leaf cluster
Oregon 30 Year Faithful Service Medal
Oregon Emergency Service Ribbon
Oregon Superior Unit Ribbon with oak leaf cluster
Oregon Faithful Service Ribbon with silver Hourglass device and "M" device

== Sources ==
- Lynn, Capi (2015). "Governor Appoints New Adjutant General". statesmanjournal.com. USA Today Network.
- "MAJOR GENERAL MICHAEL E. STENCEL The Adjutant General, Oregon". State of Oregon. 2016.
- Ingersoll, Christopher L. (2015). "Oregon's Adjutant General Visits New School, Emergency Shelter in Vietnam". pacom.mil. USA Department of Defense.
