= McNary ARNG Field Heliport =

Military heliport in Salem, United States

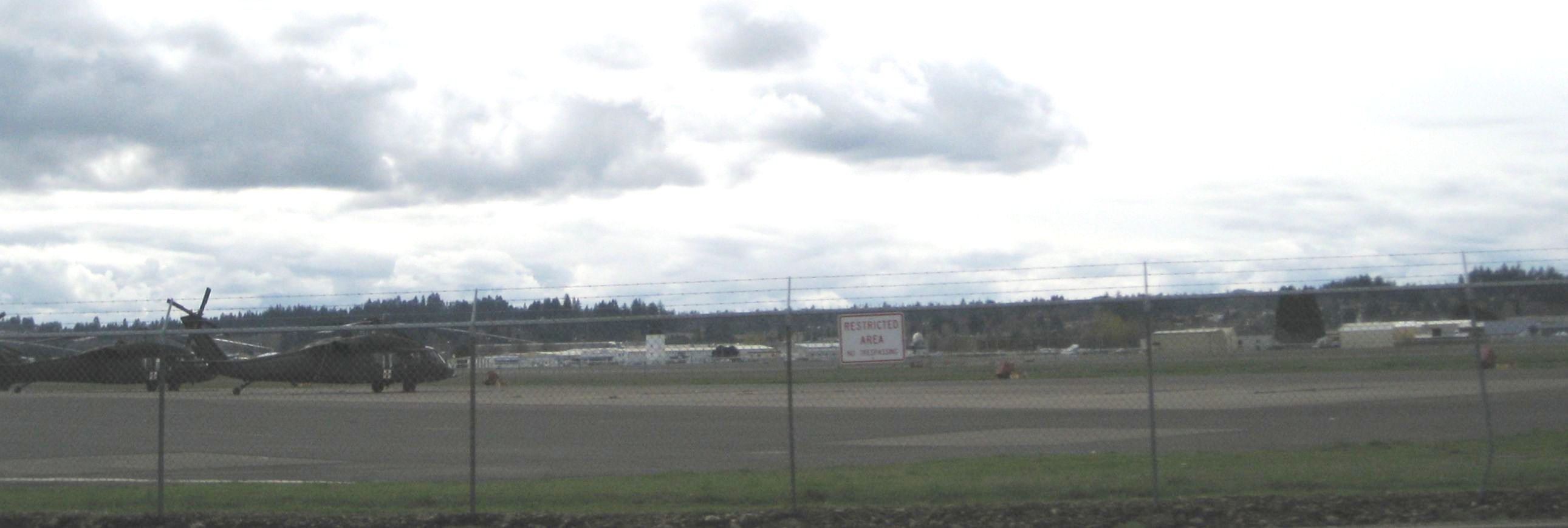
- IATA: none; ICAO: none; FAA LID: 4OR1

Summary
- Airport type: Military
- Operator: Oregon National Guard
- Location: Salem, Oregon
- Elevation AMSL: 209 ft / 64 m
- Coordinates: 44°54′36″N 123°00′09″W
- Interactive map of McNary ARNG Field Heliport

Helipads
Number	Length		Surface
Number	ft	m	Surface
H1	200 x 100	61 x 30	Asphalt

McNary ARNG Field Heliport (FAA LID: 4OR1) is a military heliport located two miles (3 km) southeast of the city of Salem in Marion County, Oregon, United States. It is located on the north east corner of Salem Municipal Airport (McNary Field). The heliport serves as the primary base of activity for the Oregon National Guard Army Aviation Support Facility.
