= 186th Infantry Regiment (United States) =

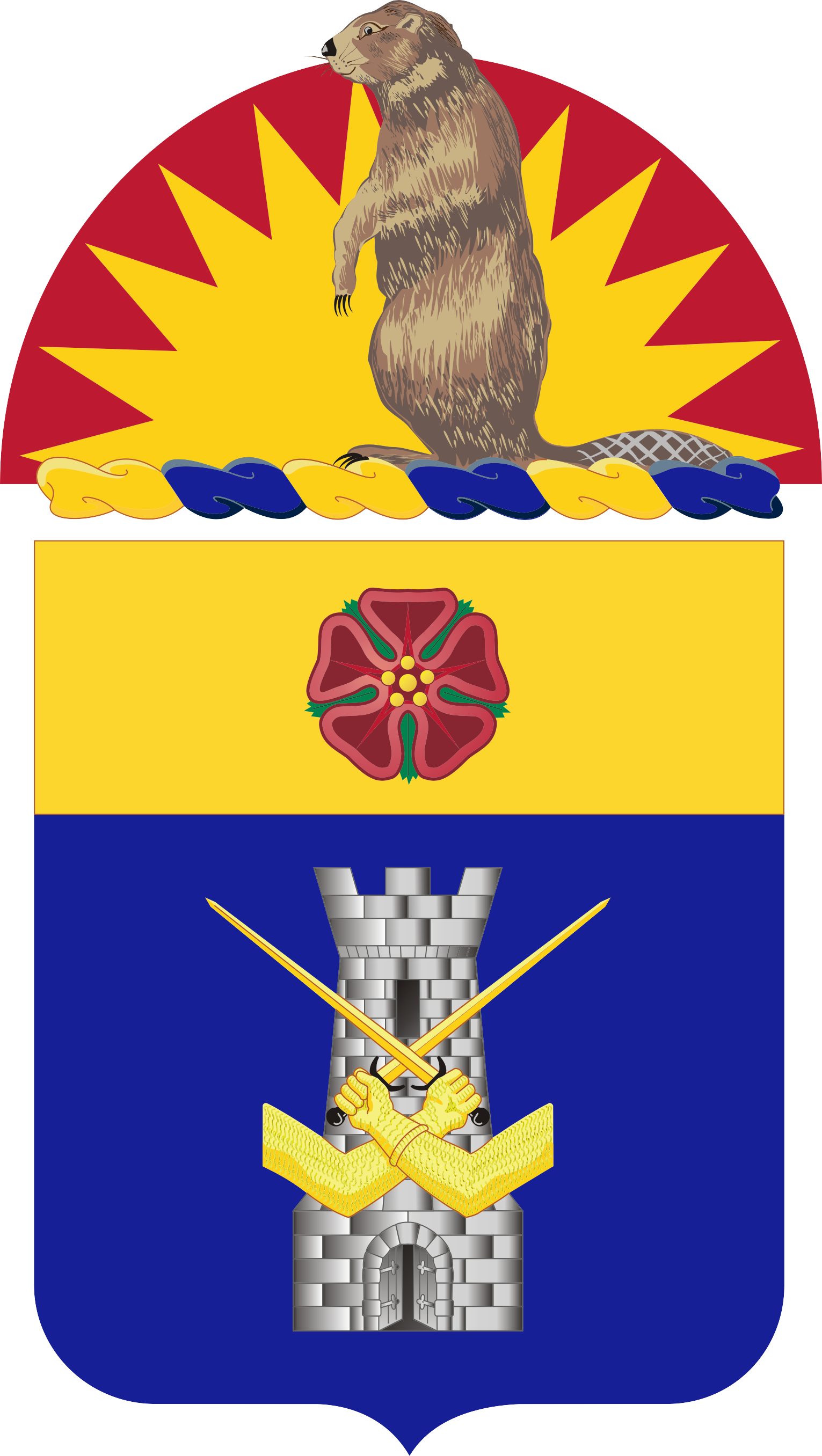
- Coat of arms
- Active: 1922 – present
- Country: United States
- Branch: United States Army
- Garrison/HQ: Ashland, Oregon
- Motto: "Custodes Portae Occidents" (Guardians of the Western Gates)
- Engagements: World War II; Iraq Campaign

Commanders
- Notable commanders: Oliver P. Newman

Insignia
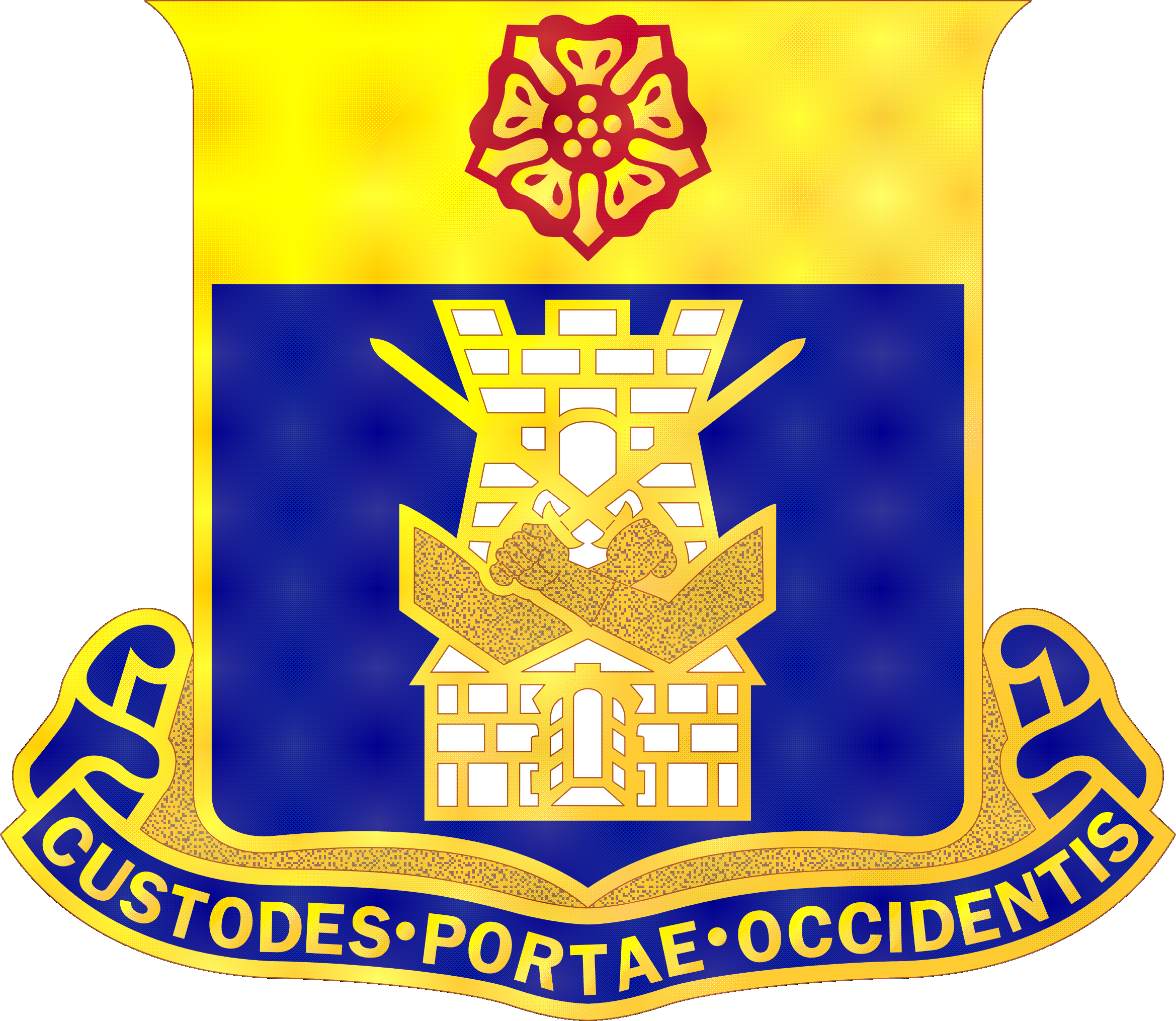
- Distinctive unit insignia

The 186th Infantry Regiment is a combat regiment of the United States Army made up of soldiers from the Oregon Army National Guard. The 1st battalion of the regiment is currently active. The 1/186th's higher headquarters is the 41st Infantry Brigade Combat Team, headquartered in Clackamas, Oregon. Its higher headquarters, in turn, is the 40th Infantry Division

== History ==
The 186th Infantry Regiment was constituted in the National Guard in 1921 with the regimental headquarters and 1st and 2nd Battalions allotted to Oregon and the 3rd Battalion allotted to Idaho. On 2 June 1923, the existing Oregon elements of the regiment (the Separate Battalion, Infantry, Oregon National Guard, with headquarters organized on 10 February 1922 at Woodburn, Oregon) were redesignated the 1st Battalion, 186th Infantry, with regimental headquarters concurrently organized and federally recognized at Portland, Oregon. The 3rd Battalion was organized in March 1922 with headquarters at Boise, Idaho; it was redesignated the 3rd Battalion, 200th Infantry Regiment, on 5 August 1924. The 3rd Battalion, 186th Infantry was subsequently withdrawn from Idaho and allotted to Oregon, with the new battalion organized and headquarters recognized at Medford, Oregon, on 24 June 1926. The regiment conducted annual summer training at Camp Lewis, Washington, 1922–24; Camp Jackson, Oregon, 1925–26; and Camp Clatsop, Oregon, 1927–39.

=== World War II ===
For nearly twenty years, soldiers of the regiment conducted normal peacetime training, but then, in 1940, they were inducted into Federal service for a year of training. When war broke out with the attack on Pearl Harbor, the year extended into 'the duration' of World War II. The 186th, as a part of the 41st Infantry Division, was one of the first American combat units to be sent overseas. The regiment served in the Pacific Theater, with the first year spent in further training in Australia.

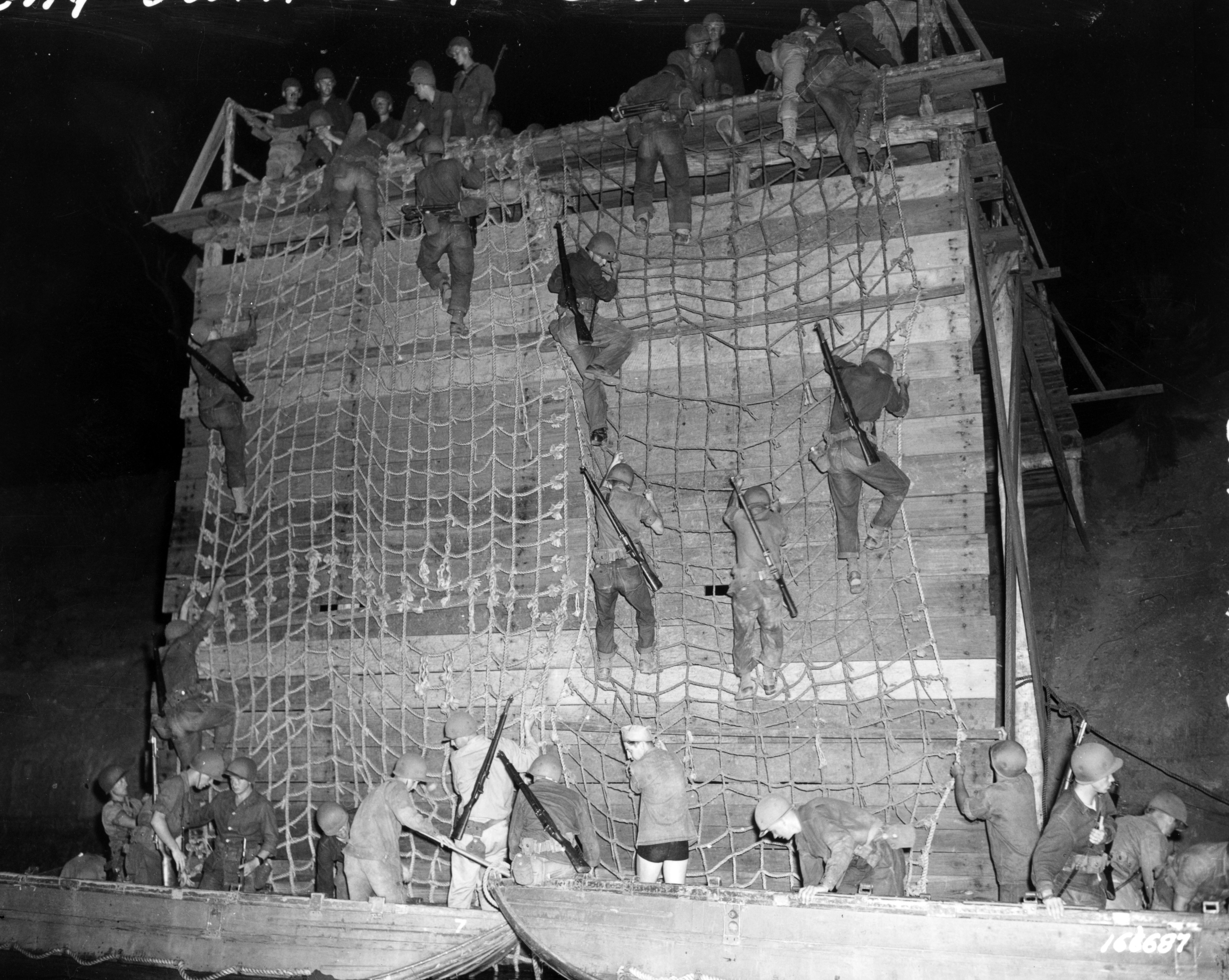
186th climbing into assault boats at night in Australia 1942

Papua-New Guinea was the site of the regiment's first combat. Working with the other regiments of the division and elements of the Australian Army, the 186th helped overcome difficult resistance by Japanese troops. The Papuan campaign lasted from early January into September 1943. The regiment landed in New Guinea in April 1944 and helped secure that archipelago by late July. Following reorganization, the effort shifted to the invasion of the Philippines.

The 186th went ashore on Palawan Island, in the southern Philippines, in February, 1945. That campaign lasted for the remainder of the war. With the 186th scheduled to take part in the invasion of Japan, planned for November, the end of the war allowed the regiment to enter Japan peacefully, as occupation troops instead. In December 1945, the regiment, and the 41st Division, were deactivated in Japan, and left active service.

=== Post-World War II ===
The regiment was re-organized in December 1946, with headquarters originally located in Portland. In 1968, another re-organization reduced the regiment to a single battalion, and headquarters was moved to Ashland. The primary mission since World War II has been to train for war, though no units have been mobilized for a war mission since that time.

Training takes place locally most of the year. The two-week annual training normally is conducted at Ft. Lewis, Washington; Camp Roberts, CA, or Camp Rilea, OR. Companies have also traveled to England and Japan for training, and the entire 41st Brigade trained at JRTC in Louisiana in 1998.

Members of the 1st Battalion have also been mobilized to fight forest fires or provide assistance during floods. The increasing need for troops to supplement active Army missions has also resulted in the first federal mobilization of one of the battalion's rifle companies since World War II. As a result, Bravo company spent four months near Riyadh, Saudi Arabia, to provide security for Patriot missile batteries.

=== Operation Enduring Freedom ===
As of mid-April 2002, the 1-186th Infantry was preparing to deploy for a six-month rotation and assume peacekeeping duties in the Sinai region of Egypt in July 2002, as part of the U.S. portion of the Multinational Force and Observers (MFO) mission. The unit was slated to replace the active-duty 172nd Separate Infantry Brigade out of Fort Wainwright, Alaska, which had originally been tasked to provide one of its battalions for the next MFO rotation. The switch was to enable freeing an active-duty unit for other missions related to the War on Terrorism if needed, and marked only the second time a reserve-component unit has been called upon to perform the Sinai mission. As of mid-April 2002, the 1-186th was scheduled to train at Fort Carson, CO, for the last of its mobilization requirements in May, and formally assume the U.S. portion of the MFO mission in July.

The battalion also sent a company from Medford, Oregon to Afghanistan in 2006 with the 41st Infantry Brigade Combat Team as part of Combined Joint Task Force Phoenix V.

=== Operation Iraqi Freedom ===
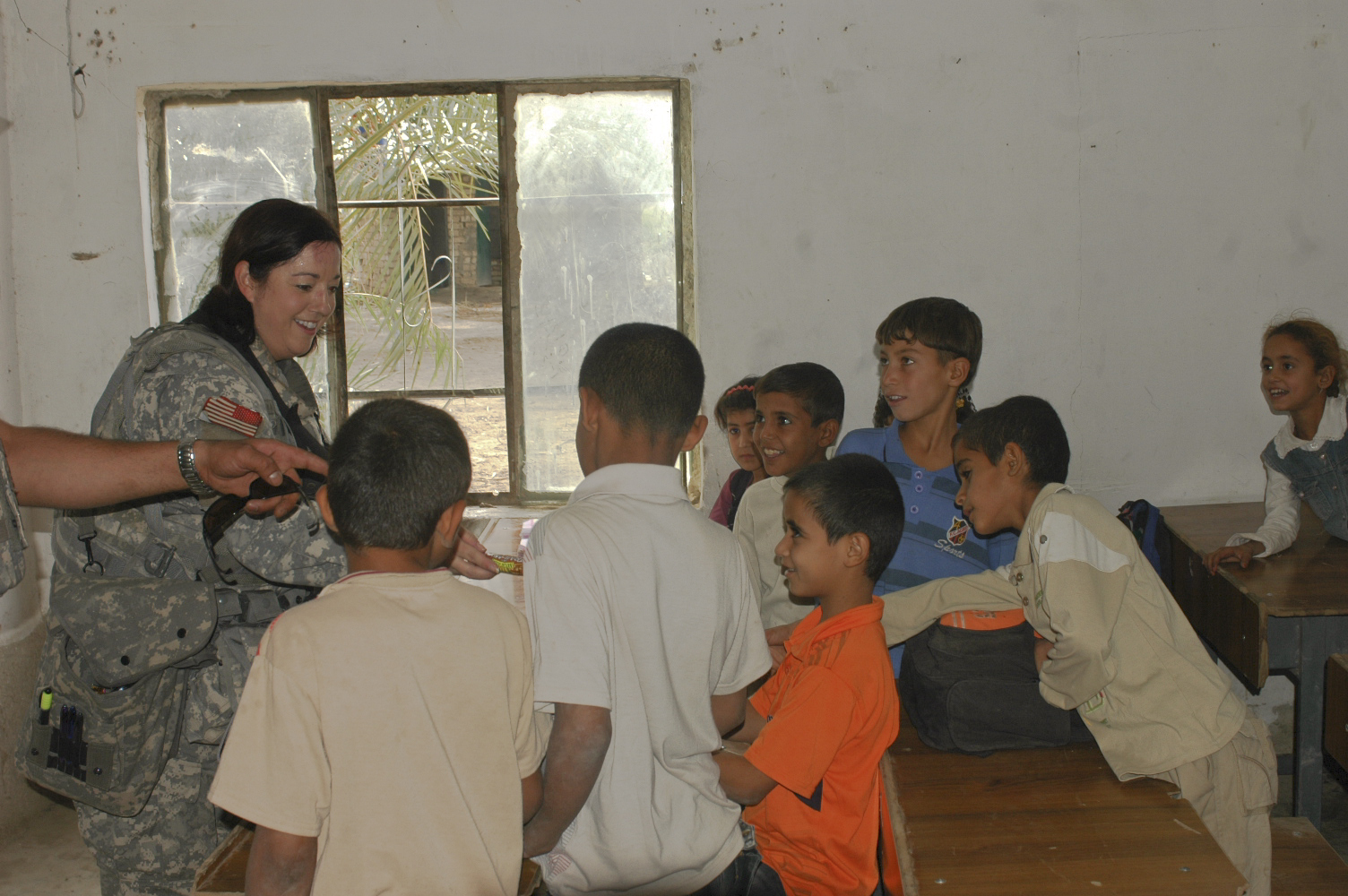
Member of 2nd Battalion in an Iraqi school

The 1st Battalion, 186th Infantry sent one company from Roseburg, Oregon to Iraq in 2003 as part of the 2nd Battalion, 162nd Infantry. In 2005 the battalion deployed to Louisiana to conduct disaster relief operations following Hurricanes Katrina and Rita.

In 2009 the battalion deployed to Iraq. Headquartered at Ali Air Base near Tallil, Iraq, it conducted convoy security operations as part of Multi-National Forces - Iraq and the 13th Expeditionary Sustainment Command. One company was detached to Camp Korean Village in the western desert, and the battalion had two additional companies attached to it: the 1055th Transportation Company from South Carolina and the 720th Convoy Security Company from New Mexico. A-Co, 1-186th, 3rd CET (Convoy Escort Team) completed more than 72 convoy missions and drove over 80,000 miles on route MSR. (Main Supply Route) Tampa. Once considered the most dangerous road in the world. Stretching from the Kuwaiti border, through southern Iraq and Baghdad, towards the northern border of Syria. A-Co, 3rd CET. accomplished this without a single casualty or loss of convoy vehicle. The 41st Infantry Brigade of Oregon held the record for most milage covered, by land, in an active warzone for any Infantry unit during a 10-month deployment. After 3 months of Mobilization training, 10 months overseas combat missions and 2 months of reintegration, the battalion finally returned from the deployment in April, 2010.

== Distinctive unit insignia ==
- Description

A Gold color metal and enamel device 1 1/8 inches (2.9 cm) in height overall consisting of a shield blazoned: Azure a tower (with doors partly opened) Argent masoned Or debruised by two dexter arms embowed fessways the forearms in saltire habited in chain armor each hand grasping a sword of the last the swords crossed in saltire. On a chief of the third a rose Gules barbed and seeded Proper. Attached below and to the sides of the shield a Blue scroll inscribed "CUSTODES ? PORTAE ? OCCIDENTIS" in Gold letters.

- Symbolism

The rose is the general flower of the Northwest. The two arms interlocked are indicative of military strength, ready to strike at an enemy who endeavors to enter the United States through the "Western Gate" (represented by the gateway in the tower). They further allude to the fact that the parent organization, the 186th Infantry Regiment, had elements in both Idaho and Oregon. The motto translates to "Guards of the Western Gate."

- Background

The distinctive unit insignia was approved on 18 May 1925.

== Coat of arms ==
=== Blazon ===
- Shield

Azure a tower (with doors partly opened) Gray masoned Sable debruised by two dexter arms embowed fessways the forearms in saltire habited in chain armor each hand grasping a sword Or hilted Sable the swords crossed in saltire. On a chief of the fourth a rose Gules barbed and seeded Proper.

- Crest

That for the regiments and separate battalions of the Oregon Army National Guard: On a wreath of the colors Or and Azure, a demi-disc Gules charged with the setting sun with twelve light rays Or (the shoulder sleeve insignia of the 41st Division), behind a beaver sejant Proper. Motto "Custodes Portae Occidents" (Guardians of the Western Gates)

=== Symbolism ===
- Shield

The rose is the general flower of the Northwest. The two arms interlocked are indicative of military strength, ready to strike at an enemy who endeavors to enter the United States through the "Western Gate" (represented by the gateway in the tower). They further allude to the fact that the parent organization, the 186th Infantry Regiment, had elements in both Idaho and Oregon.

- Crest

The crest is that of the Oregon Army National Guard.

=== Background ===
The coat of arms was approved on 28 May 1924. It was amended to delete the crest for the State of Idaho on 22 April 1949.

=== Current units ===
The companies are located in seven separate towns located in Southern Oregon.

HHC: Ashland, OR

A CO: Medford, OR

B CO: Salem, OR

A CO Det: Klamath Falls, OR

C CO: Roseburg, OR

1/C: Coos Bay, OR

D CO: Grants Pass, OR

H(FSC): Medford, OR
