= 116th Air Control Squadron =

United States Air Force squadron

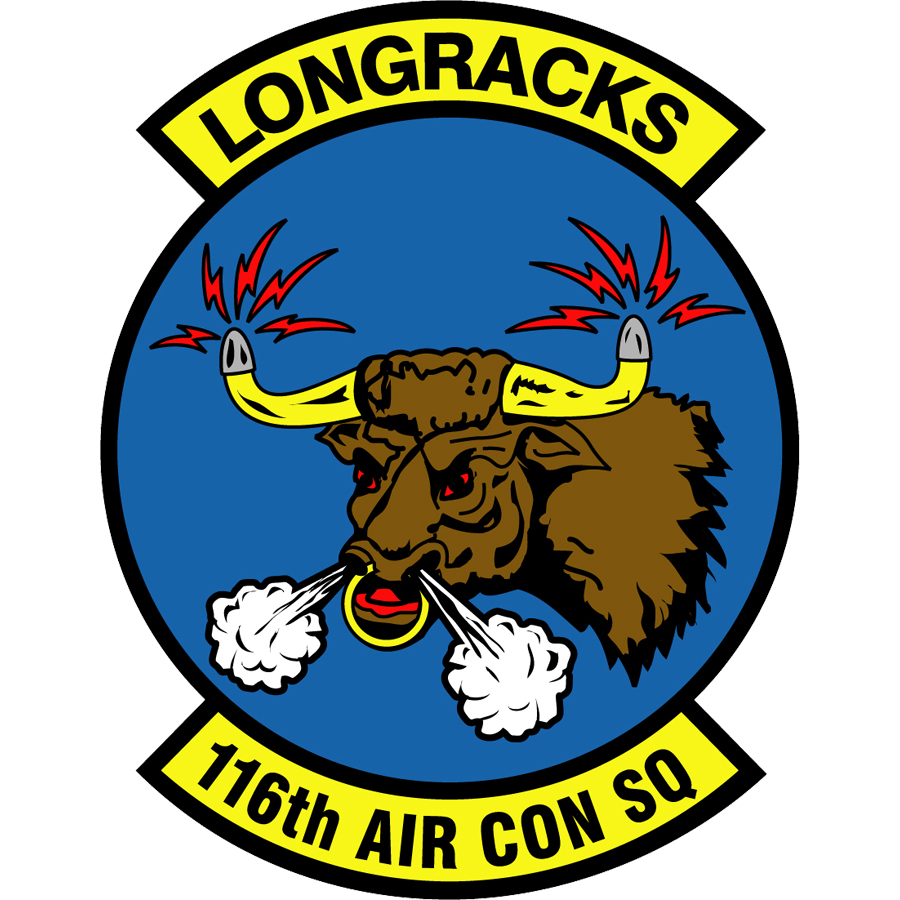
- 116th Air Control Squadron emblem
- Active: 1946–present
- Country: United States
- Branch: United States Air Force
- Type: Squadron
- Role: Command and Control
- Part of: Air National Guard
- Garrison/HQ: Camp Rilea Armed Forces Training Center, Oregon
- Nickname: Longracks

Commanders
- Current commander: Lt. Col. Nicholas Rhodes

The 116th Air Control Squadron is a United States Air Force squadron located at Camp Rilea Armed Forces Training Center near Warrenton/Astoria, Oregon. In March 2011 the 116th departed for a deployment to Qatar. In 2006 the squadron deployed to Kandahar Air Base in support of Air Expeditionary Force 3 and 4, and Operation Enduring Freedom for 120 days. The 116th ACS is a deployable airspace command & control unit, with radar and communications capabilities.

== History ==
=== 116th timeline ===
Air Control Squadron Allotted: 24 May 1946 to ANG

Aircraft Control & Warning Squadron (Tactical), Marietta Army Air Base, Georgia Sewart Air Force Base, Tennessee July 1951 – 8 October 1952

Tactical Control Squadron Portland, Air National Guard Base, Oregon Relocated: Camp Rilea, Warrenton, Oregon October 1988 9 June 1971 – 1 May 1987

Tactical Control Flight Portland, Air National Guard Base, Oregon Relocated: Camp Rilea, Warrenton, Oregon October 1988 1 May 1987 – 16 June 1992

Air Control Squadron Camp Rilea, Warrenton, Oregon Redesignated: ACS 16 June 1992 Equipment: MPS-11A, TPS-40, TPS-43E, TPS-75, replacement radar August 1975 due to structural failures.

2025: https://www.142wg.ang.af.mil/News/Article-Display/Article/4229373/warrenton-airmen-return-from-deployment-as-squadron-converts-to-cyberwarfare/

== Deployments ==
- 1971 Portland ANG Base, Oregon In-garrison 17 members to Volk Field WI
- 1972 Portland ANG Base, Oregon In-garrison 15–29 July, Guard Strike IV (Westacs)
- 1973 Boise, Idaho Sentry Westacs II South of Gowen Field
- 1974 Portland ANG Base, Oregon In-garrison
- 1975 Camp Rilea, Warrenton, Oregon
- 1976 Portland ANG Base, Oregon In-garrison 14–28 Aug
- 1977 Coyote Lake, Fort Irwin, CA Brave Shield XVI 5–23 July
- 1978 Camp Rilea, Warrenton, Oregon Taurus Beach 78 5–19 Aug
- 1979 Camp Rilea, Warrenton, Oregon Taurus Beach 79 7–21 July
- 1980 North Bend AFS, Oregon Felix Brave 23 Feb – 1 Mar
- 1980 Camp Rilea, Warrenton, Oregon Taurus Beach III 12–26 July
- 1981 Camp Rilea, Warrenton, Oregon Felix Keynote 81-4 Sept
- 1982 Yakima Firing Range, Yakima, Washington Golden Blade 82 1–15 May
- 1983 Camp Rilea, Warrenton, Oregon Sentry Eagle 83
- 1984 Portland ANG Base/North Bend ANGS 14–28 July
- 1985 Kingsley Field/Swan Lake Peak Kingsley Field Deployment 85-1 7–22 Sep
- 1986 Portland, ANG Base, Oregon Inland Viking 11–27 July
- 1986 Camp Rilea, Warrenton, Oregon Beaver Hunt 86 17–19 July
- 1987 Portland ANG Base, Oregon Road Warrior
- 1988 Camp Rilea, Warrenton, Oregon Beaver Hunt 88
- 1988 Camp Rilea Unit Relocation October October
- 1988 Bear River Ridge
- 1989 Panama Sentry Eagle 89-3 Aug
- 1989 Pedro Dome, AK Brim Frost 89 18 Jan-4 Feb
- 1989 Camp Rilea, Warrenton, Oregon Beaver Hunt 89\ 12-17June
- 1990 Camp Pendelton, California Sentry Eagle 90-3 4–19 Aug
- 1990 Camp Rilea, Warrenton, Oregon Beaver Hunt 90 June
- 1990 Laredo, Texas Anchor Mark V Aug −1 Oct (?)
- 1991 Angie III\ Feb – May 91
- 1991 Puerta Plata, Dominican Republic
- 1992 Dominican Republic Angie III
- 1992 Tonopah, NV Green Flag 92–5
- 1993 Letica Columbia,
- 1993 Tonopah, NV Green Flag 93–3
- 1994 Camp Rilea, Warrenton, Oregon In-garrison
- 1995 Tonopah, NV Green Flag 95–3
- 1996 Camp Rilea, Warrenton, Oregon In-garrison
- 1997 Camp Rilea, Warrenton, Oregon In-garrison/ORI
- 1998 Italy Operation Deliberate Guard / Determined Falcon May–July (Personnel Only)
- 1998 Camp Rilea, Warrenton, Oregon Weasel Hunt 98
- 1999 Camp Rilea, Warrenton, Oregon Sentry West 99
- 2000 Pedro Dome, AK Cope Thunder, Northern Edge
- 2000 Jackson, WY Noble Eagle 2000
- 2001 NAS Whidbey Is. WA Noble Eagle Oct 2001–2002
- 2001 Nevada Red Flag
- 2002 Neah Bay, WA & Mt Hebo, OR May (?) – June (?) 2002
- 2002 Jackson Hole, WY Dec 02 – Jan 03, Operation Noble Eagle "Operation Grinch"
- 2002 Jackson Hole, WY 2 July 2002 – 9 Sep 2003
- 2003 Grand Teton National Park, WY Operation Noble Eagle
- 2004
- 2005
- 2006 Afghanistan 6 Sep 2006 – 7 Jan 2007
- 2007 US/Mexican border Operation JumpStart
- 2008 US/Mexican border Operation JumpStart, Afghanistan ONE
- 2009 Iraq OIF Sep 2008 – Feb 2009
- 2011 Operation Enduring Freedom
- 2015 Operation Inherent Resolve May–November 2015
- 2019 Operation Inherent Resolve November 2019-June 2020
- 2024 Operation Spartan Shield, Operation Inherit Resolve October 2024-April 2025

== See also ==
- Oregon Air National Guard
