= 196 =

196 may also refer to:

- 196 (number)
- 196 BC
- AD 196
- 196 (New Jersey bus)
- 196 Philomela, a main-belt asteroid
- JWH-196
- Jordan 196
- Kosmos 196
- Lectionary 196
- TR-196
- USA-196
- USS Searaven (SS-196)
- USS Rinehart (DE-196)
- USS Logan (APA-196)
- USS George E. Badger (DD-196)
- USS Mahopac (ATA-196)
- USS Minidoka (AK-196)
- German submarine U-196
- No. 196 Squadron RAF
- 196th Infantry Brigade (United States)
- 196th Infantry Division (Wehrmacht)
- 196th Ohio Infantry
- 196th Battalion (Western Universities), CEF
- 196th Infantry Regiment (United States)
- 196th Division (People's Republic of China)

== Transportation routes ==
- Florida State Road 196
- Alabama State Route 196
- Pennsylvania Route 196
- Georgia State Route 196
- Maine State Route 196
- New York State Route 196
- Ohio State Route 196
- Utah State Route 196
- Malaysia Federal Route 196
- Japan National Route 196
- Iowa Highway 196
- Wyoming Highway 196
- State Highway 196 (Maharashtra)
- Colorado State Highway 196
- Mexican Federal Highway 196
- K-196 (Kansas highway)
- Interstate 196

== See also ==
- 196th (disambiguation)
