= 147th Field Artillery Regiment =

- Active: 1884–present
- Country: United States
- Allegiance: South Dakota; United States
- Branch: South Dakota Army National Guard; National Guard of the United States
- Type: Field artillery
- Size: Regiment (one battalion active)
- Nicknames: "First South Dakota" (special designation)
- Mottos: Pret et Volontiers ("Ready and Willing")
- Colors: Red

The 147th Field Artillery Regiment is a field artillery parent regiment under the United States Army Regimental System, part of the South Dakota Army National Guard, that has one battalion on active duty, the 1st Battalion, 147th Field Artillery, part of the 115th Field Artillery Brigade. The regiment traces its lineage to the militia of the Dakota Territory, being first organized as an infantry unit in 1884. The regiment has battle credits for the Philippine Insurrection, World War I, World War II, and the global war on terrorism.

== History ==
=== Indian Wars, Philippine Insurrection, and early 20th century ===
The 147th Field Artillery was first organized in 1884–1885 in the Dakota Territorial Militia as the 2nd Infantry Regiment. On 22 February 1889, President Grover Cleveland signed an act of Congress that admitted the Dakota Territory to the union as two separate states, North Dakota and South Dakota; the Organized Militia of South Dakota was redesignated on 6 March 1893 as the South Dakota National Guard. The 2nd Infantry Regiment was redesignated on 9 September 1893 as the 1st Infantry Regiment. For the Spanish–American War, the 2nd Regiment was mustered into federal service from 12 to 19 May 1898 at Sioux Falls as the 1st South Dakota Volunteer Infantry, and mustered out of federal service on 5 October 1899 at the Presidio of San Francisco, California. It was reorganized on 11 April 1901 in the South Dakota National Guard as the 1st Regiment. The 2nd Regiment was organized from August 1901-August 1902, and the 1st and 2nd Regiments were respectively reorganized and redesignated on 17 March 1903 as the 2nd and 3rd Regiments. The two regiments were consolidated on 16 May 1905 to form the 4th Infantry Regiment.

=== Mexican border service and World War I ===
The 4th South Dakota was mustered into federal service on 30 June 1916 for service on the Mexican border during the Pancho Villa Expedition, and mustered out of federal service on 3 March 1917 at Fort Crook, Nebraska. After the U.S. declaration of war on the German Empire in April 1917, marking America's entry into World War I, the 4th South Dakota was mustered into federal service on 15 July 1917 at Aberdeen, and drafted into federal service on 5 August 1917. On 3 October 1917, the Headquarters and Supply Companies, 1st Battalion, and Companies H and M of the 4th South Dakota were converted and consolidated with Batteries A and B, Oregon Field Artillery, to form the 147th Field Artillery Regiment, a 75 mm gun regiment assigned to the 66th Field Artillery Brigade, 41st Division, a division also made up of National Guard troops from Colorado, the District of Columbia, Idaho, Montana, New Mexico, North Dakota, Oregon, Washington, and Wyoming. The division trained at Camp Greene, North Carolina, and was sent overseas in November and December 1917. The division itself did not see any combat, being reduced to a skeleton cadre immediately after arrival and utilized as one of the "depot divisions" or "replacement divisions" for the American Expeditionary Forces in France to receive, train, and forward casualty replacements to combat units. The 147th Field Artillery was detached intact from the division and served as corps artillery, chiefly attached to the 32nd Division's 57th Field Artillery Brigade. The regiment arrived at the port of Philadelphia, Pennsylvania on 14 May 1919 on the battleship USS Kansas and was demobilized on 23 May 1919 at Camp Dodge, Iowa.

=== Interwar period ===
Pursuant to the National Defense Act of 1920, the 147th Field Artillery was reconstituted in the National Guard in 1921 as a truck-drawn 75 mm gun regiment, assigned to the General Headquarters Reserve, and allotted to South Dakota. The regimental headquarters was organized and federally recognized on 11 May 1922 at Pierre. The regiment was converted from truck-drawn to portée in February 1927. The regimental headquarters was successively relocated as follows: to Vermillion on 1 January 1928, to Rapid City on 8 February 1938, and to Sioux Falls on 14 February 1939. The regiment was converted from portée back to truck-drawn on 1 January 1935. It conducted annual summer training most years at Camp Rapid, the South Dakota National Guard camp near Rapid City, but also trained at Fort Meade, South Dakota, Pierre, South Dakota, Mitchell, South Dakota, and Camp Sparta, Wisconsin. The 147th Field Artillery was inducted into federal service on 25 November 1940 at home stations, and was transferred on 8 December 1940 to Fort Ord, California, and assigned to the 26th Field Artillery Brigade. It was reorganized in 1941 with new 105 mm howitzers. The regiment departed the San Francisco Port of Embarkation on 22 November 1941 bound for Manila, Philippines via Hawaii, aboard the Army transport ship USAT Willard A. Holbrook as part of the Pensacola Convoy; after the convoy was formed and departed Hawaii, it learned of the Japanese attack on Pearl Harbor and rapid advances in the South Pacific, and was redirected to Australia.

==== Commanders ====
- Colonel Boyd Wales - 11 May 1922 – 22 August 1937
- Colonel Eugene I. Foster - 17 June 1939–June 1941
- Lieutenant Colonel Leslie Jensen - June 1941–13 August 1941
- Colonel Paul V. Kane (Regular Army) - 13 August 1941 – 26 June 1942

=== World War II ===
On 6 August 1943, the regiment was sent to New Guinea. On 31 December 1943, while stationed on Kiriwina island, the regiment's 1st and 2nd Battalions were redesignated the 260th and 147th Field Artillery Battalions, respectively, while on 18 January 1944, the regimental headquarters and headquarters battery returned to Australia where it was reorganized and redesignated as the Headquarters and Headquarters Battery, I Corps Artillery. The Headquarters and Headquarters Battery, I Corps Artillery, was inactivated on 31 May 1946 in Japan. The 147th Field Artillery Battalion landed on New Guinea itself on 6 April 1944, Noemfoor on 2 July 1944, and Luzon, Philippines, on 11 January 1945. It was inactivated on 17 January 1946 in Japan. The 260th Field Artillery Battalion fought in the New Guinea campaign and was inactivated on 10 June 1945 at Finschhafen, New Guinea.

=== Cold War ===
The Headquarters and Headquarters Battery, I Corps Artillery, and the 260th and 147th Field Artillery Battalions were consolidated, reorganized, and federally recognized on 16 February 1947 as the 147th Field Artillery Battalion, with headquarters at Sioux Falls. During the Korean War, the battalion was ordered into federal service on 1 September 1950. The 147th Field Artillery Battalion (NGUS) was organized in its stead and federally recognized on 1 September 1952 with headquarters at Sioux Falls. While in active service, the 147th Field Artillery was reorganized and redesignated on 15 October 1953 as the 147th Armored Field Artillery Battalion; it was released from federal service on 10 October 1954 and reverted to state control as the 147th Field Artillery Battalion, with federal recognition concurrently withdrawn from the 147th Field Artillery Battalion (NGUS).

The 147th Field Artillery Battalion was consolidated on 21 October 1959 with the 260th (see Annex 1), 642nd (see Annex 2), and 643rd (see Annex 3) Field Artillery Battalions to form the 147th Artillery, a parent regiment under the U.S. Army Combat Arms Regimental System, to consist of the 1st-4th Howitzer Battalions. The 1st Howitzer Battalion was ordered into federal service on 1 October 1961 during the Berlin Crisis at home stations, and was released on 11 August 1962 from federal service. The regiment was reorganized on 15 April 1963 to consist of the 1st-3rd Howitzer Battalions, and reorganized on 4 January 1968 to consist of the 1st and 2nd Battalions. Redesignated on 1 May 1972 as the 147th Field Artillery. Withdrawn 1 June 1989 from the Combat Arms Regimental System and reorganized under the United States Army Regimental System.

==== Annex 1 ====
Organized about 1884 in the Dakota Militia at Mitchell, Dakota Territory, as Company i, 2nd Regiment. Redesignated 9 September 1893 as Company I, 1st Regiment. Mustered out of state service by May 1898 at Mitchell. Reorganized 7 May 1901 at Mitchell as Company D, 1st Regiment. Reorganized and redesignated 17 March 1903 as Company D, 2nd Regiment. Redesignated 16 May 1905 as Company D, 4th Infantry. Redesignated 17 December 1909 as Company F, 4th Infantry. Mustered out of state service 19 July 1910 at Mitchell. Reorganized about 1914 at Mitchell as Company F, 4th Infantry. Mustered into federal service 30 June 1916; mustered out of federal service 3 March 1917. Mustered into federal service 15 July 1917; drafted into federal service 5 August 1917. Converted and redesignated 5 October 1917 as Company F, 116th Supply Train. Demobilized 19 February 1919 at Camp Dix, New Jersey. Reorganized and federally recognized 3 August 1921 at Mitchell as Battery B, 147th Field Artillery. Inducted into federal service 25 November 1940. Reorganized and redesignated 31 December 1943 as Battery B, 260th Field Artillery Battalion. Inactivated 10 June 1945 on New Guinea. Reorganized and federally recognized 18 December 1946 at Mitchell as Company B, 196th Infantry. Ordered into federal service 1 September 1950 at Mitchell; Company B, 196th Infantry (NGUS) organized and Federally recognized 1 September 1952 at Mitchell. Released 10 October 1954 from federal service and reverted to state control, with federal recognition concurrently withdrawn from Company B, 196th infantry (NGUS). Converted and redesignated 15 September 1956 as Headquarters and Headquarters Battery, 260th Field Artillery Battalion.

==== Annex 2 ====
Constituted 24 June 1946 in the South Dakota National Guard as Company G, 196th Infantry. Organized and federally recognized 28 March 1947 at Redfield. Ordered into federal service 1 September 1950 at Redfield; Company G, 196th Infantry [NGUS], organized and federally recognized 1 September 1952 at Redfield. Released 10 October 1954 from federal service and reverted to state control; federal recognition concurrently withdrawn from Company G, 196th infantry (NGUS). Converted and redesignated 15 September 1956 as Headquarters and Headquarters Battery, 642nd Field Artillery Battalion, with organic elements concurrently organized from existing units.

==== Annex 3 ====
Constituted 24 June 1946 in the South Dakota National Guard as the Antitank Company, 196th Infantry. Organized and federally recognized 31 January 1946 at Webster. Reorganized and redesignated 24 February 1949 as the Tank Company, 196th Infantry. Ordered into federal service 1 September 1950 at Webster; Tank Company, 196th Infantry [NGUS], organized and federally recognized 1 September 1952 at Webster. Released 10 October 1954 from federal service and reverted to state control, with federal recognition concurrently withdrawn from the Tank Company, 196th Infantry (NGUS).

=== Modern ===
The 1st Battalion was ordered into federal service on 15 March 2003 at home stations, and released from federal service on 27 May 2003 and reverted to state control. The 2nd Battalion was ordered into federal service on 18 December 2003 at home stations and released from federal service on 5 June 2005 and reverted to state control. The regiment was redesignated on 1 October 2005 as the 147th Field Artillery Regiment, and reorganized on 1 September 2008 to consist of the 1st Battalion. The battalion was ordered into federal service 15 April 2009 at home stations and released from federal service on 19 May 2010 and reverted to state control.

== Heraldry ==
=== Coat of arms ===
==== Shield ====
Parti per chevron reversed, gules and azure, a pairle argent between in chief a projectile palewise of the last charged with the insignia of the 32nd Division proper (a cross bar shot through with a red arrow), a palm tree and a giant cactus, both or.

==== Crest ====
That for the regiments and separate battalions of the South Dakota Army National Guard: On a wreath of the colors argent and gules, a coyote statant proper.

==== Symbolism ====
The shield is red and blue since the regiment has been both artillery and infantry. The charge in chief recalls service in World War I, and those in the lower part of the shield service in the Philippines and on the Mexican border.

=== Distinctive unit insignia ===
Shield and motto of the coat of arms.

== Honors ==
=== Campaign participation credit ===
Philippine Insurrection

- Manila
- Malolos

World War I

- Alsace
- Aisne-Marne
- Meuse-Argonne
- Lorraine 1918
- Champagne 1918

World War II

- East Indies
- New Guinea (with arrowhead device)
- Bismarck Archipelago
- Luzon (with arrowhead device)

The Headquarters Battery, 1st Battalion, based in Watertown, is a descendant of the 34th Signal Company, 34th Infantry Division, and is additionally entitled to:

World War II

- Tunisia
- Naples-Foggia
- Anzio
- Rome-Arno
- North Apennines
- Po Valley

Battery B, 1st Battalion, headquartered in Yankton, is additionally entitled to:

Global War on Terrorism

- Iraq:
  - Iraqi Governance
  - National Resolution
  - Iraqi Surge

=== Decorations ===
- Meritorious Unit Commendation (Army), streamer embroidered IRAQ 2003–2005
- Meritorious Unit Commendation (Army), Streamer embroidered IRAQ 2009–2010
- French Croix de Guerre with Gilt Star, World War I, Streamer embroidered AISNE-MARNE, OISE-AISNE
- Philippine Presidential Unit Citation, Streamer embroidered 17 OCTOBER 1944 TO 4 JULY 1945

Headquarters Battery, 1st Battalion, additionally entitled to:

- Meritorious Unit Commendation (Army), Streamer embroidered EUROPEAN THEATER
- French Croix de Guerre with Palm, World War II, Streamer embroidered BELVEDERE

Battery B, 1st Battalion, additionally entitled to:

- Meritorious Unit Commendation (Army), Streamer embroidered IRAQ 2005–2006
