= 196th Regiment =

196th Regiment may refer to:

- 196th Infantry Regiment (United States)

== American Civil War regiments ==
- 196th Ohio Infantry Regiment
- 196th Pennsylvania Infantry Regiment

== See also ==
- 196th (disambiguation)
