= Wyoming Army National Guard =

Component of the US Army and military of the U.S. state of Wyoming

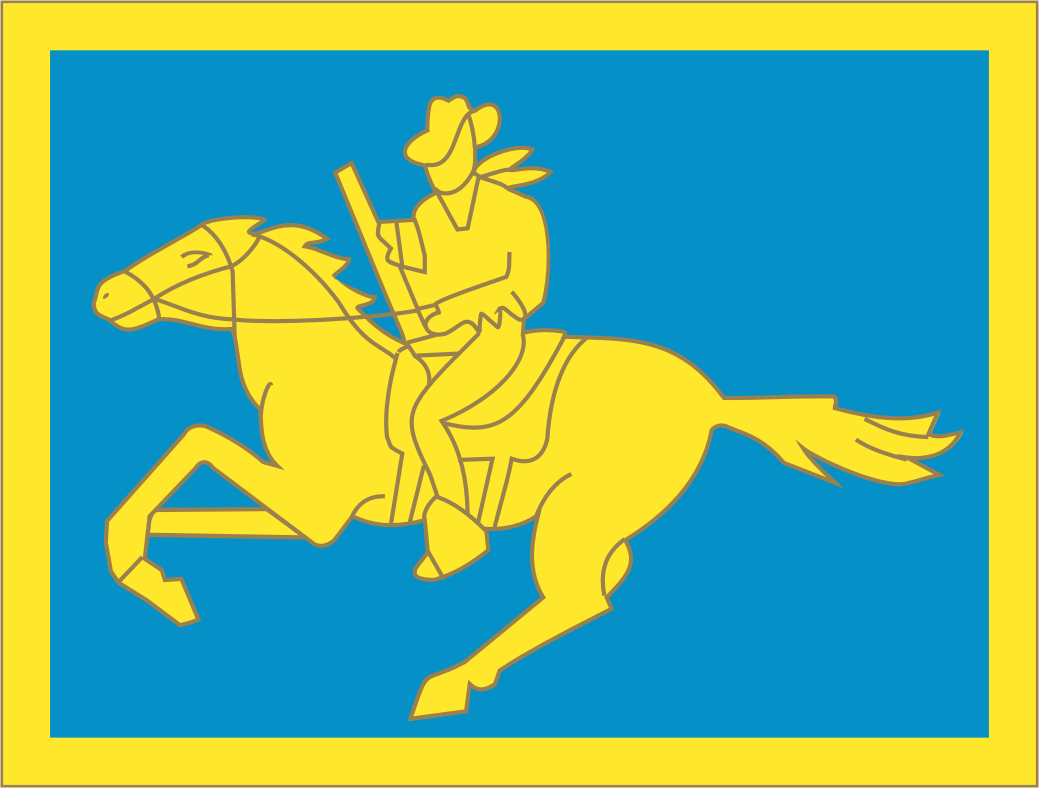
- Wyoming Army National Guard STARC SSI
- Active: December 31, 1871- Present
- Country: United States
- Allegiance: Wyoming
- Branch: United States Army
- Role: United States Army National Guard
- Size: ~1,500
- Garrison/HQ: Cheyenne, Wyoming
- Nickname: The Cowboy Guard
- Website: https://www.wyomilitary.wyo.gov/

Commanders
- Assistant Adjutant General Army: BG Steve Alkire

Insignia
- Wyoming Army National Guard Crest

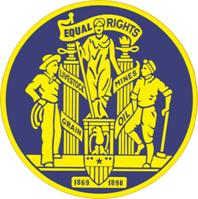
- Wyoming Army National Guard STARC DUI

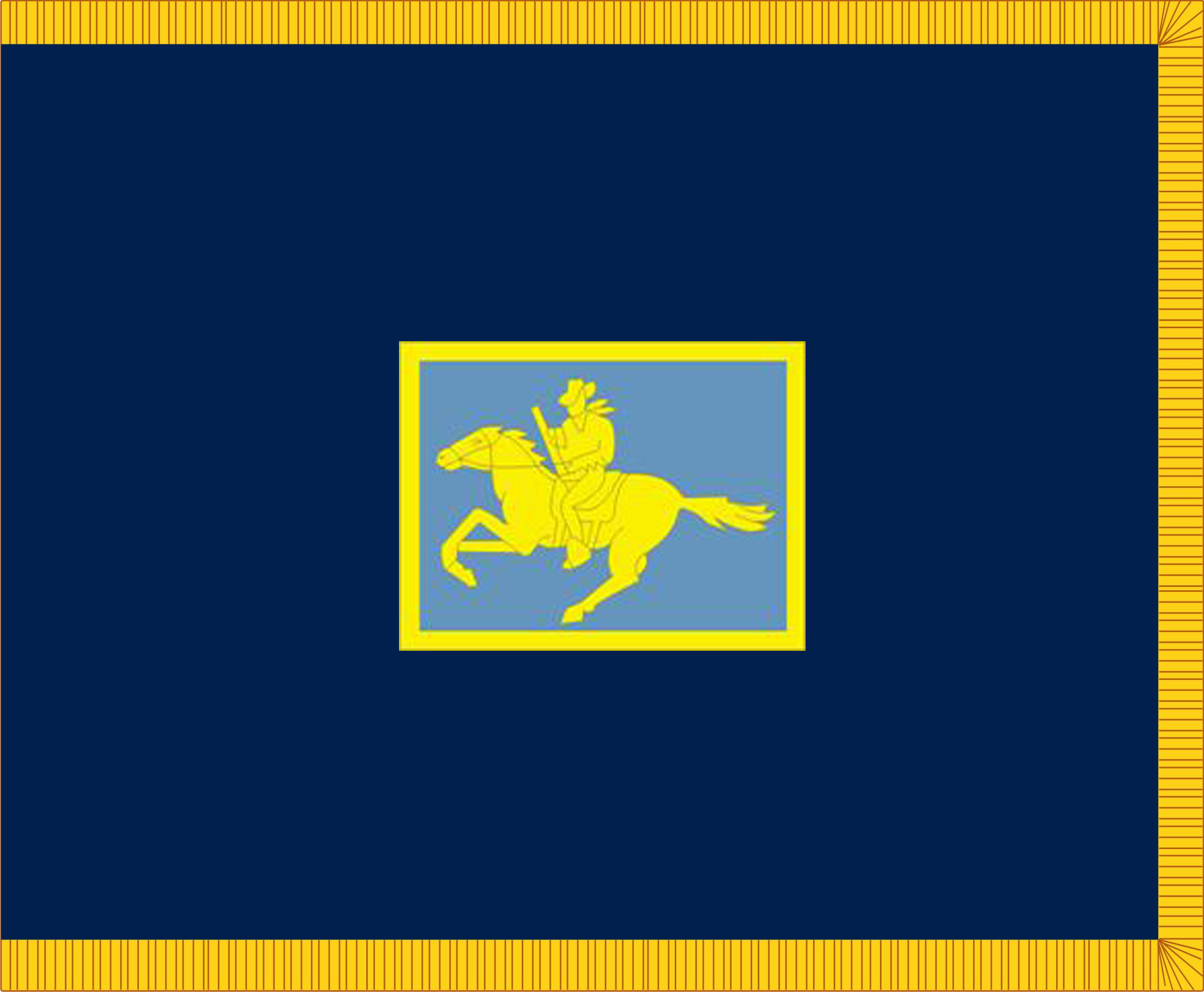
- Wyoming Army National Guard Headquarters Flag

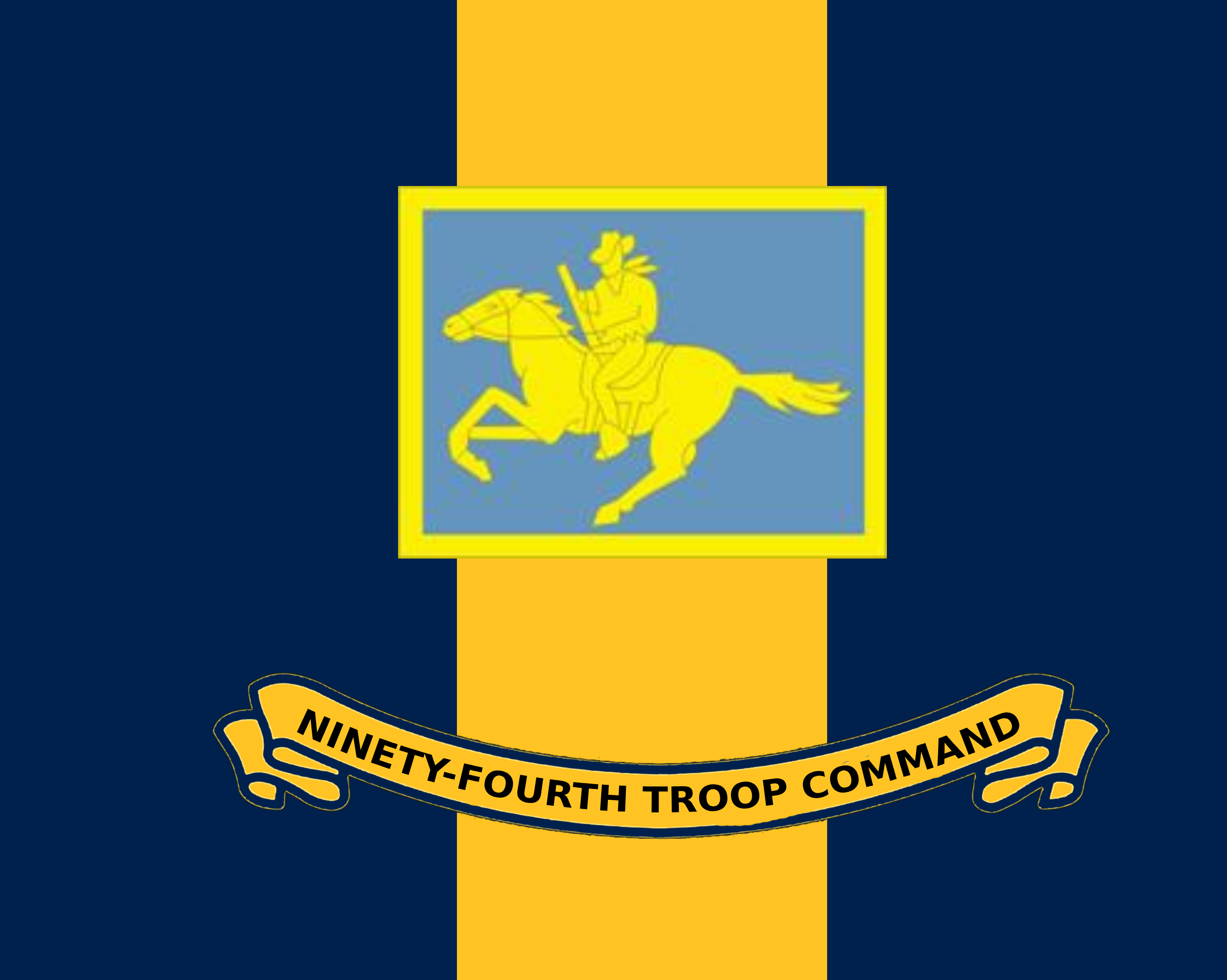
- Wyoming Army National Guard 94th Troop Command Flag

The Wyoming Army National Guard is the Army National Guard of Wyoming. It includes army aviation, construction engineers, field artillery and medical asset units. It was reorganized in 1996, consolidating its two field artillery battalions into a single battalion. A ribbon bridge company and rear operations center for an infantry division were added to the Guard.

It is administered by the Wyoming Military Department, part of the Wyoming state government. The Wyoming Military Department's goal is to provide a trained, quality-based force, supported by appropriate equipment, facilities and real property, technology, and services to successfully execute state and federal missions.

== History ==
The Wyoming Army National Guard was established in 1870, during the Wyoming Territory period, when territorial governor John A. Campbell authorized the division of the Wyoming Territory into three military districts. On December 31, 1871, a law passed by the Wyoming Territorial Assembly gave legal sanction to volunteer militia companies of not less than 40 men.

The first federally recognized Wyoming unit was Company A, 1st Wyoming Regiment: The Laramie Grays, organized in 1888. The Laramie Grays were followed by the organization of Company B: The Cheyenne Guard the same year. Several other units including the Cheyenne Rangers, the 1st Regiment, the Wyoming Home Guard, and the Wyoming Rangers were formed because of concerns over conflicts with Native American tribes but were short-lived.

When Wyoming became a state in 1890, constitutional provisions allowed for the formation of units in Buffalo, Evanston, Douglas, Green River, Rock Springs, Rawlins and Sheridan.

Wyoming's first artillery unit, Battery A, and a regimental band were formed in May, 1894. The artillery unit was equipped with two three-inch Hotchkiss guns, drawn by horse.

The Wyoming National Guard was first federally mobilized during the Spanish–American War in 1898. Since then, the Guard has seen active service in the Mexican Punitive Campaign, World War I, World War II, the Berlin Crisis and Korea. Wyoming Guard units have also served in Desert Storm, the Bosnia peacekeeping force, Operation Iraqi Freedom, Operation Enduring Freedom and Hurricane Katrina response.

The Wyoming National Guard 300th Armored Field Artillery Battalion was commemorated in 1983 as part of the National Guard Heritage Painting series at the Pentagon for their combat action during the Battle of Soyang during the Korean War.

== Organization ==
As of January 2026 the Wyoming Army National Guard consists of the following units:

- Joint Force Headquarters-Wyoming, Army Element, in Cheyenne
  - Headquarters and Headquarters Company, Joint Force Headquarters-Wyoming, Army Element, in Cheyenne
  - Wyoming Recruiting & Retention Battalion, in Cheyenne
  - Wyoming Medical Detachment, in Cheyenne
  - 84th Civil Support Team (WMD), in Cheyenne
  - Camp Guernsey Joint Training Center, in Guernsey
  - Unit Training Equipment Site #1, in Guernsey
  - Army Aviation Support Facility #1, at Cheyenne Air National Guard Base
  - Combined Support Maintenance Shop #1, in Guernsey
  - Field Maintenance Shop #1, in Sheridan
  - Field Maintenance Shop #2, in Laramie
  - Field Maintenance Shop #3, in Lander
  - Field Maintenance Shop #5, in Casper
  - 94th Troop Command, in Laramie
    - Headquarters and Headquarters Company, 94th Troop Command, in Laramie
    - 67th Army Band, in Wheatland
    - 133rd Engineer Company (Engineer Construction Company), in Laramie
      - Detachment 1, 133rd Engineer Company (Engineer Construction Company), in Rock Springs
    - 197th Public Affairs Detachment, in Laramie
    - Company C, 1st Battalion, 297th Infantry Regiment, in Afton (part of 29th Infantry Brigade Combat Team)
      - Detachment 1, Company C, 1st Battalion, 297th Infantry Regiment, in Evanston
    - Company D (Weapons), 1st Battalion, 297th Infantry Regiment, in Laramie (part of 29th Infantry Brigade Combat Team)
    - Detachment 1, Company A (CAC), 2nd Battalion (General Support Aviation), 149th Aviation Regiment, at Cheyenne Air National Guard Base (UH-60L Black Hawk)
      - Detachment 7, Company D (AVUM), 2nd Battalion (General Support Aviation), 149th Aviation Regiment, at Cheyenne Air National Guard Base
      - Detachment 7, Company E (Forward Support), 2nd Battalion (General Support Aviation), 149th Aviation Regiment, at Cheyenne Air National Guard Base
    - Company G (MEDEVAC), 2nd Battalion (General Support Aviation), 211th Aviation Regiment, at Cheyenne Air National Guard Base (HH-60L Black Hawk)
      - Detachment 6, Company D (AVUM), 2nd Battalion (General Support Aviation), 211th Aviation Regiment, at Cheyenne Air National Guard Base
      - Detachment 6, Company E (Forward Support), 2nd Battalion (General Support Aviation), 211th Aviation Regiment, at Cheyenne Air National Guard Base
    - Detachment 6, Company B, 2nd Battalion (Fixed Wing), 245th Aviation Regiment (Detachment 53, Operational Support Airlift Activity), at Cheyenne Air National Guard Base (C-12 Huron)
    - Detachment 3, Company B (AVIM), 834th Aviation Support Battalion, at Cheyenne Air National Guard Base
  - 115th Field Artillery Brigade, in Cheyenne
    - Headquarters and Headquarters Battery, 115th Field Artillery Brigade, in Cheyenne
    - 1st Battalion, 144th Field Artillery Regiment, in Van Nuys (CA) (M109A6 Paladin) — (California Army National Guard)
    - 1st Battalion, 147th Field Artillery Regiment, in Watertown (SD) (M270A2 MLRS) — (South Dakota Army National Guard)
    - 1st Battalion, 151st Field Artillery Regiment, in Montevideo (MN) (M109A6 Paladin) — (Minnesota Army National Guard)
    - 2nd Battalion, 300th Field Artillery Regiment, in Casper (M142 HIMARS)
      - Headquarters and Headquarters Battery, 2nd Battalion, 300th Field Artillery Regiment, in Casper
      - Battery A, 2nd Battalion, 300th Field Artillery Regiment, in Gillette
      - Battery B, 2nd Battalion, 300th Field Artillery Regiment, in Lander
      - 920th Forward Support Company, in Torrington
        - Detachment 1, 920th Forward Support Company, in Douglas
    - 960th Brigade Support Battalion, in Sheridan
      - Headquarters Support Company, 960th Brigade Support Battalion, in Sheridan
        - Detachment 1, Headquarters Support Company, 960th Brigade Support Battalion, in Worland
        - Detachment 2, Headquarters Support Company, 960th Brigade Support Battalion, in Powell
      - 148th Signal Company, in Cheyenne
  - 213th Regiment, Regional Training Institute, in Guernsey
    - 1st Modular Training Battalion, in Guernsey

Aviation unit abbreviations: CAC — Command Aviation Company; MEDEVAC — Medical evacuation; AVUM — Aviation Unit Maintenance; AVIM — Aviation Intermediate Maintenance
