= 115th Field Artillery Brigade =

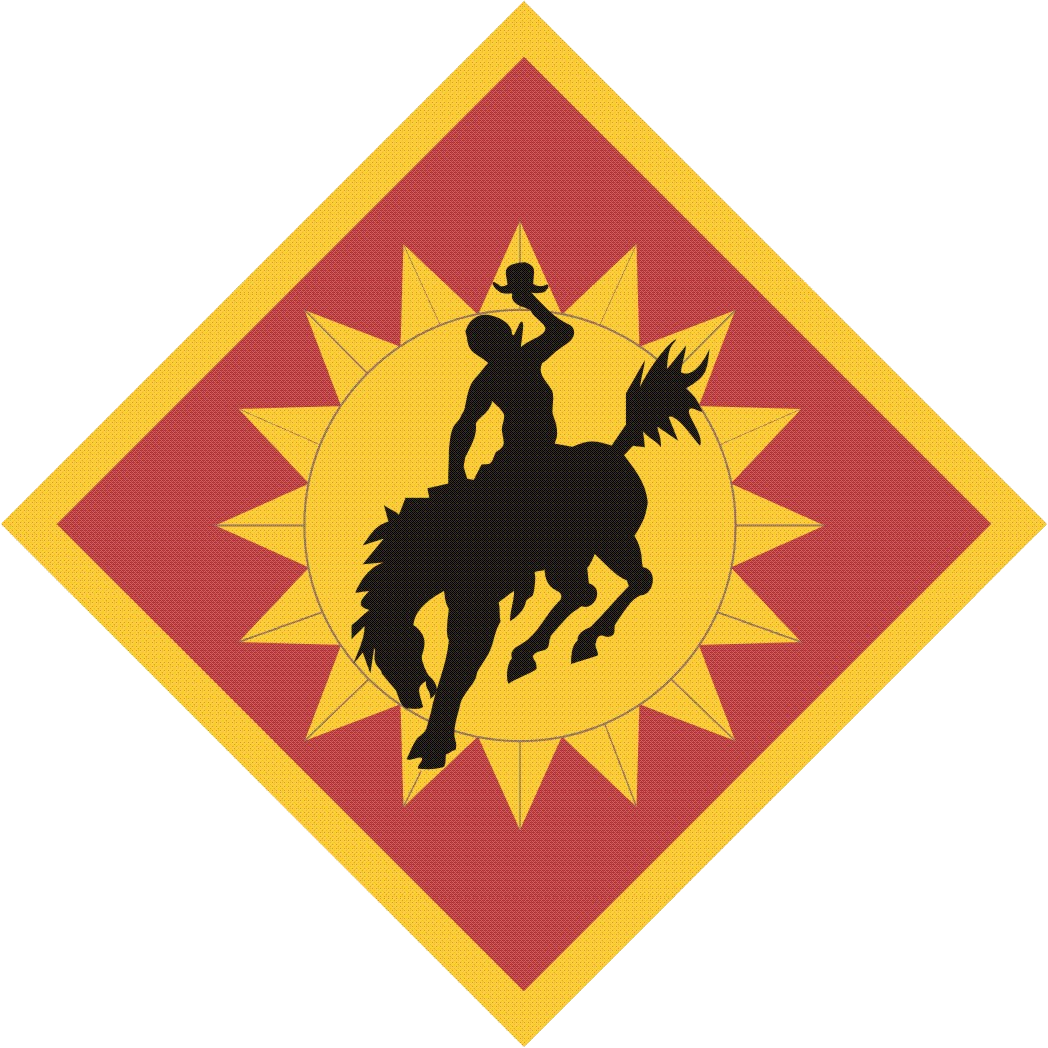
- Active: 1 September 1978 - present
- Country: United States
- Branch: United States Army National Guard
- Type: Field Artillery
- Size: Brigade
- Part of: Wyoming Army National Guard
- Garrison/HQ: Cheyenne, WY
- Nickname: Cowboy Thunder
- Website: http://wyomilitary.wyo.gov/

Commanders
- Current commander: COL Alexander Fisher
- Command Sergeant Major: CSM Deborah Manzanares

Insignia
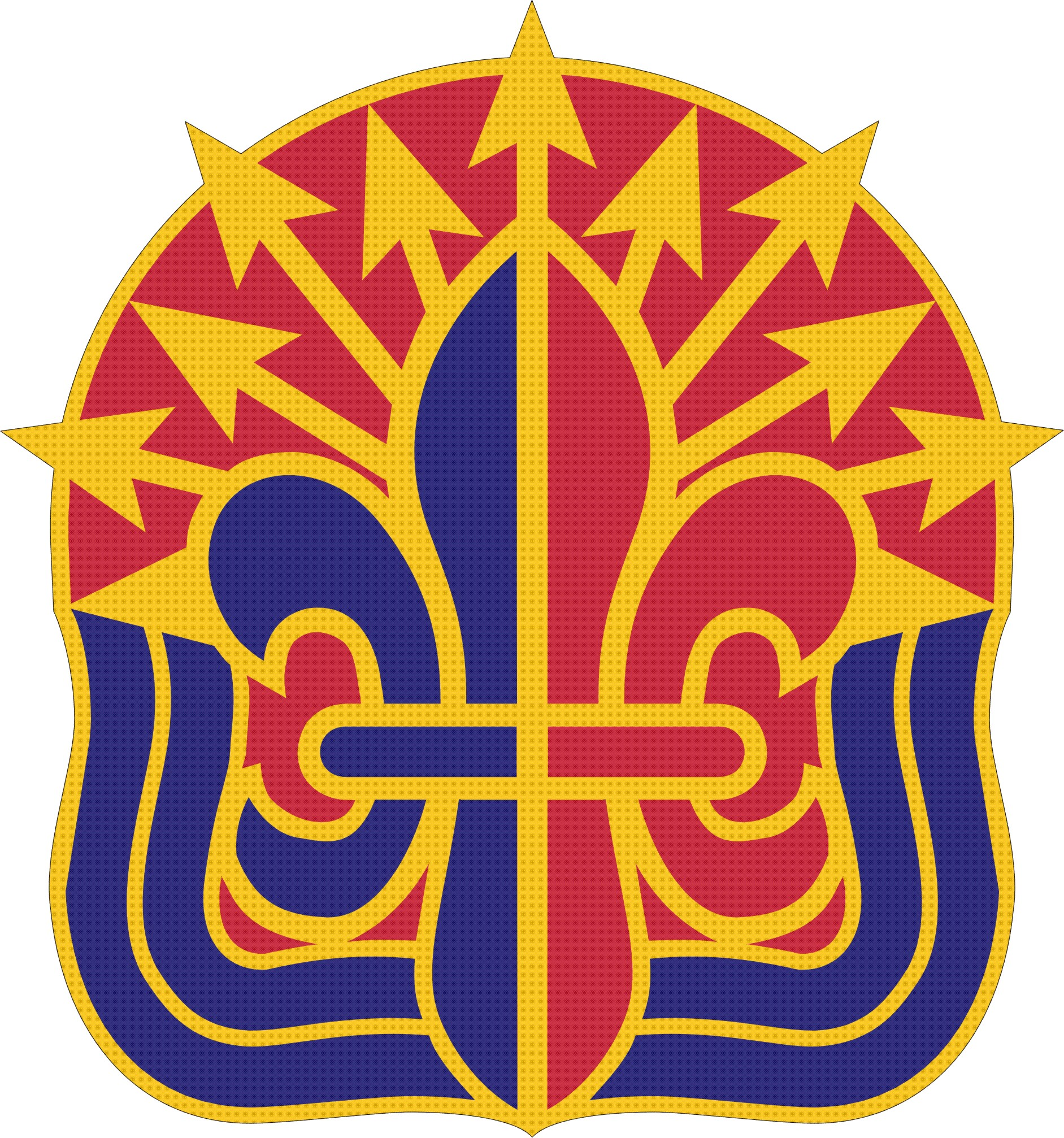
- 115th Field Artillery Brigade DUI

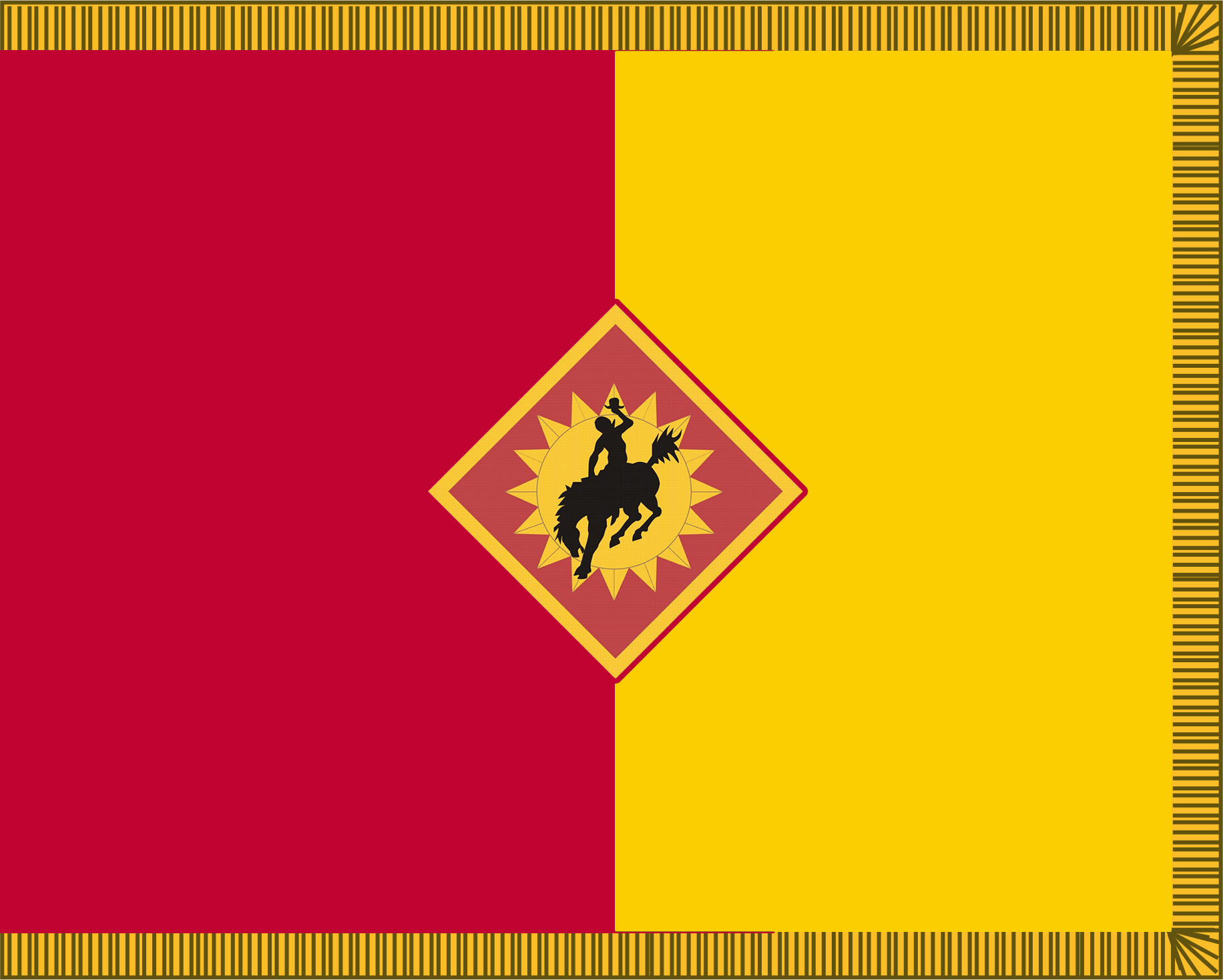
- 115th Field Artillery Brigade Flag

The 115th Field Artillery Brigade, known as “Cowboy Thunder” is an artillery formation of the United States Army, raised by the Wyoming Army National Guard. It is headquartered in Cheyenne, Wyoming. Its history stretches back to the 1800s when Wyoming was a U.S. territory. The first muster formation was in 1888 as 1st Regiment Infantry. It was redesignated as the 115th Field Artillery Brigade September 1, 1978.

The Headquarters and Headquarters Company, 197th Armored Cavalry Group, and the 115th and 117th Tank Battalions were consolidated 1 March 1951 to form the 115th Armored Cavalry, with headquarters at Cheyenne. Headquarters and Headquarters Company, 115th Armored Cavalry, converted and redesignated 16 January 1953 as Headquarters and Headquarters Battery, 115th Field Artillery Group (remainder of regiment—hereafter separate lineages). Redesignated 1 August 1959 as Headquarters and Headquarters Battery, 115th Artillery Group. Consolidated 18 December 1967 with Company C, 102d Engineer Battalion (organized and Federally recognized 25 September 1956 at Cheyenne), and consolidated unit designated as Headquarters and Headquarters Battery, 115th Artillery Group. Redesignated 1 May 1972 as Headquarters and Headquarters Battery, 115th Field Artillery Group. Redesignated 1 September 1978 as Headquarters and Headquarters Battery, 115th Field Artillery Brigade.

In 1959, the 300th Armored Field Artillery Battalion was consolidated with two other armored field artillery battalions into the 49th Field Artillery under the Combat Arms Regimental System. In 1996, the 49th was reorganized and redesignated as the 300th Field Artillery.

In the mid 1980s, the brigade consisted of the 1st Battalion, 49th Field Artillery Regiment, and the 3rd Battalion, 49th Field Artillery. The regiment had a long history, dating back to units formed in the Wyoming Territory. On 1 September 1996, both battalions were reorganized into a single towed artillery battalion, the 2-300 FA. The new battalion remained headquartered in Sheridan.

== Organization ==
As of January 2026 the 115th Field Artillery Brigade consists of the following units:

- 115th Field Artillery Brigade, in Cheyenne (WY)
  - Headquarters and Headquarters Battery, 115th Field Artillery Brigade, in Cheyenne (WY)
  - 148th Signal Company, in Cheyenne (WY)
  - 1st Battalion, 144th Field Artillery Regiment, in Burbank (CA) (M109A6 Paladin) (California Army National Guard)
  - 1st Battalion, 147th Field Artillery Regiment, in Watertown (SD) (M270A1 MLRS) (South Dakota Army National Guard)
  - 1st Battalion, 151st Field Artillery Regiment, in Montevideo (MN) (M777A2) (Minnesota Army National Guard)
  - 2nd Battalion, 300th Field Artillery Regiment, in Casper (WY) (M142 HIMARS)
    - Headquarters and Headquarters Battery, 2nd Battalion, 300th Field Artillery Regiment, in Casper (WY)
    - Battery A, 2nd Battalion, 300th Field Artillery Regiment, in Gillette (WY)
    - Battery B, 2nd Battalion, 300th Field Artillery Regiment, in Lander (WY)
    - 920th Forward Support Company, in Torrington (WY)
      - Detachment 1, 920th Forward Support Company, in Douglas (WY)
  - 960th Brigade Support Battalion, in Sheridan (WY)
    - Headquarters and Headquarters Company, 960th Brigade Support Battalion, in Sheridan (WY)
      - Detachment 1, Headquarters and Headquarters Company, 960th Brigade Support Battalion, in Worland (WY)
      - Detachment 2, Headquarters and Headquarters Company, 960th Brigade Support Battalion, in Powell (WY)
