= 196th Division =

196th Division may refer to:

- 196th Division (People's Republic of China)
- 196th Infantry Division (Wehrmacht), Germany
- 196th Rifle Division, Soviet Union

== See also ==
- List of military divisions by number
- 196th Brigade (disambiguation)
- 196th Regiment (disambiguation)
- 196th (disambiguation)
