= 196th =

196th may refer to:

- 196th (2/1st Highland Light Infantry) Brigade, Territorial Force division of the British Army during the First World War
- 196th Battalion (Western Universities), CEF, unit in the Canadian Expeditionary Force during the First World War
- 196th Division (People's Republic of China), military formation of the Chinese People's Volunteer Army
- 196th Infantry Brigade (United States) ("Chargers"), part of the United States Army Reserve's 98th Division
- 196th Infantry Regiment (United States), infantry regiment of the United States Army National Guard
- 196th Ohio Infantry (or 196th OVI), infantry regiment in the Union Army during the American Civil War
- 196th Reconnaissance Squadron (196 RS), unit of the 163d Reconnaissance Wing of the California Air National Guard
- 196th Street (Manhattan)
- Pennsylvania's 196th Representative District

== See also ==
- 196
- 196 (number)
- 196 AD
- 196 BC
