= 196th Brigade =

196th Brigade may refer to:

- 196th Motorized Infantry Brigade, People's Republic of China
- 196th (2/1st Highland Light Infantry) Brigade, United Kingdom
- 196th Infantry Brigade (United States)
- 196th Maneuver Enhancement Brigade, United States

== See also ==
- 196th Regiment (disambiguation)
