= 24th Cavalry Division (United States) =

24th Cavalry Division Shoulder Sleeve Insignia
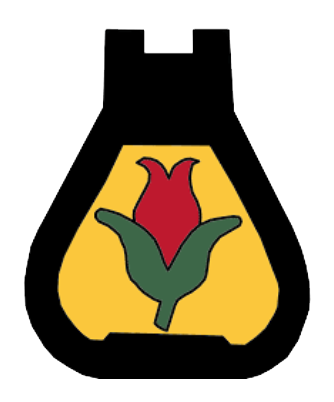
- Active: 1921 – 1940
- Disbanded: Inactivated 6 October 1940; Disbanded 1 November 1940
- Countries: United States of America
- Branch: United States Army
- Type: Cavalry
- Size: Division
- Garrison/HQ: Topeka, Kansas

The 24th Cavalry Division was a cavalry division of the United States Army, mostly drawn from the National Guards of the Midwest states. It was created after World War I from the perceived need for additional cavalry units. It numbered in succession of the Regular Army divisions, which were not all active at its creation. Going into World War II, the US Army Cavalry Branch contained three Regular Army, four National Guard, and six Organized Reserve cavalry divisions, as well as one independent cavalry brigade.

Like the other National Guard cavalry divisions, the 24th Cavalry Division was geographically dispersed across the United States. At various points during its existence, the division was composed of, or intended to have been composed of, personnel from the Idaho, Iowa, Kansas, Minnesota, North Dakota, South Dakota, Utah, Washington, and Wyoming National Guards.

== History ==
The 24th Cavalry Division was constituted in 1921, originally allotted to the states of Colorado, Kansas, Idaho, Iowa, Minnesota, South Dakota, Washington, and Wyoming, and assigned to the Third Army. It was reassigned to the Fourth Army as a result of the army reorganization of 1933. Organizationally, the 24th Cavalry Division was unique in that it was the only National Guard cavalry division to maintain the same brigades and regiments from the beginning of its existence to the end. It was the least affected by reorganizations, and as a partial result, organized its headquarters a full three years before the other divisions. As constituted, the 24th Division consisted of the 57th and 58th Cavalry Brigades. The 57th included Iowa’s 113th Cavalry and Kansas’ 114th Cavalry. The 57th Machine Gun Squadron, while constituted, assigned to the brigade, and allotted to the state of South Dakota, was never organized. The 58th consisted of Wyoming’s 115th Cavalry, Idaho’s 116th Cavalry, and the 58th Machine Gun Squadron of Washington and Wyoming. In addition to the combat units, the support units were constituted as inactive units and assigned to the division in 1921. These included the 24th Signal Troop, 128th Ordnance Company (Maintenance), 168th Field Artillery Battalion (Horse), 128th Engineer Battalion (Mounted), and 24th Division Quartermaster Train. The 124th Medical Squadron was constituted and assigned in 1924. In July 1926, the 168th Field Artillery Battalion was organized from the 1st Battalion, 158th Field Artillery, which was formerly assigned to the 45th Division. One other unique fact about the 24th Cavalry Division was the organization in 1939 of a division aviation section. This section consisted of the 120th Observation Squadron, 120th Photo Section, and a Medical Department Detachment, all from Colorado and formerly assigned to the 45th Division.

All of the armory drill periods were designed to prepare the troops for the annual two-week summer camp. Unfortunately, the camps for the units of the division were spread out all over the western United States, which made it difficult to assemble units larger than a regiment. For example, the division headquarters troop trained at Camp Murray, Washington; the 57th Brigade and the 113th Cavalry at Camp Dodge, Iowa; the 114th Cavalry at Fort Riley, Kansas; the 115th Cavalry at Pole Mountain Military Reservation, Wyoming; the 58th Brigade and 116th Cavalry at Boise Barracks, Idaho; and the 168th Field Artillery trained at Fort Logan, Colorado. On 28 January 1936, the headquarters of the 24th Cavalry Division was federally recognized at Topeka, Kansas, under the command of Major General William K. Herndon. Realizing the difficulties he faced in training his division, General Herndon immediately set out to assemble the entire organization at Fort Riley for the 1936 summer camp. Unfortunately, the funds for the movement of all the troops, horses, and equipment were not available, and the plan was shelved. Instead, General Herndon developed a plan to assemble the division staff (the members of which came from the several states that comprised the division) for training. His idea included the provision that the staff would hold their camp with a different regiment each year, at least until funds became available to bring the division together. Enough funds were available to support this plan, which was implemented beginning the summer of 1936. The division staff assembled for training that summer at Camp Guernsey, Wyoming, with the 115th Cavalry. For the 1937, 1938, and 1939 camps, the entire division headquarters trained at Camp Dodge, Camp Guernsey, and Boise Barracks, respectively.

In 1940, Herndon and the division staff traveled to Fort Bliss, Texas, to train with the staff of the 1st Cavalry Division, 24–27 March. This training was specifically designed to prepare the staff for that summer’s maneuvers. Although these efforts were a step in the right direction, the closest the 24th Division ever came to operating as a full division was during the Fourth Army maneuvers in July and August 1940. For the Ninth Corps Area maneuver, General Herndon was able to concentrate the division headquarters, the headquarters troop, the 58th Cavalry Brigade complete, and the 24th Reconnaissance Squadron at Centralia, Washington. In this exercise, the division (-) was the cavalry force for the provisional Blue Corps, consisting of the 3rd Division, the 40th Division, and miscellaneous coast artillery and support units. While the bulk of the division was training in Washington, a large portion of it was finishing its participation in the Seventh Corps Area maneuver near Camp Ripley, Minnesota, in July and early August. In that exercise, the 57th Cavalry Brigade, reinforced by the 24th Signal Troop and the 4th Cavalry Regiment (Horse and Mechanized), constituted the reconnaissance and screening force for the provisional Red VII Corps. The 168th Field Artillery and the 120th Observation Squadron were not part of the Fourth Army maneuvers; being located in the Eighth Corps Area, they participated in the Third Army’s Louisiana Maneuvers that August. The results of the large-scale maneuvers of 1935–40, coupled with events in Poland and France, convinced army planners that the day of employing large bodies of horse cavalry were numbered. As a result, like the other three National Guard cavalry divisions, the 24th was inactivated in October 1940 and disbanded on 1 November 1940.

== Organization (1940) ==
The headquarters location of the unit is shown where organized. Two asterisks indicated the unit was allotted, but unorganized or inactive, with the state of headquarters allocation shown.

- Headquarters (Topeka, Kansas)
- Headquarters, Special Troops (Iowa National Guard) **
  - Headquarters Troop (Tacoma, Washington)
  - 24th Signal Troop (Sioux City, Iowa)
  - 128th Ordnance Company (Medium) (Iowa National Guard) **
  - 24th Tank Company (Light) (Not allotted)
- 57th Cavalry Brigade (Des Moines, Iowa)
  - Headquarters Troop (Des Moines, Iowa)
  - 113th Cavalry Regiment (Des Moines, Iowa)
  - 114th Cavalry Regiment (Topeka, Kansas)
- 58th Cavalry Brigade (Boise, Idaho)
  - Headquarters Troop (Nampa, Idaho)
  - 115th Cavalry Regiment (Cheyenne, Wyoming)
  - 116th Cavalry Regiment (Boise, Idaho)
- 24th Reconnaissance Squadron (Torrington, Wyoming)
- 168th Field Artillery Regiment (Denver, Colorado)
- 128th Engineer Squadron (Colorado National Guard) **
- 124th Medical Squadron (Colorado National Guard) **
- 124th Quartermaster Squadron (Iowa National Guard) **
- 120th Observation Squadron (Denver, Colorado)

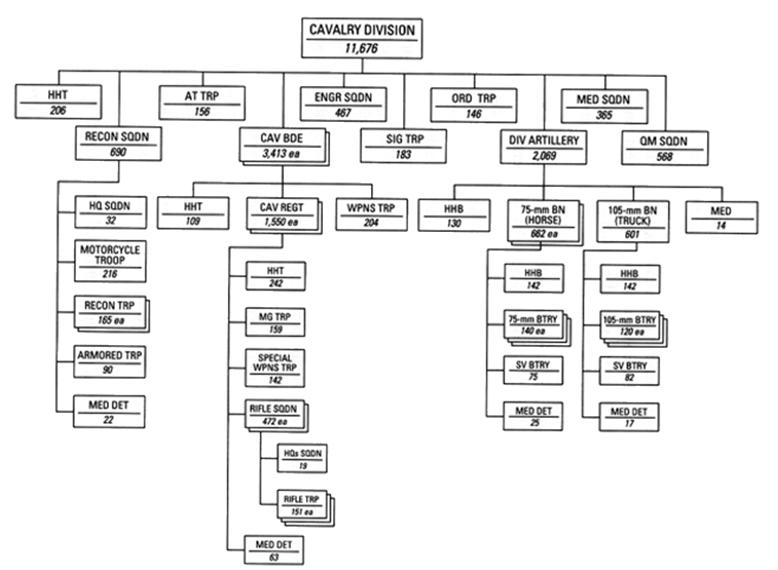
Standard organization chart for a Cavalry Division in November 1940

== Disbandment ==
Pre-war United States Army planning did not contemplate the use of National Guard or Organized Reserve cavalry divisions in wartime. After the disbandment of the National Guard cavalry divisions, former division units either remained intact and separate, were absorbed by other units, were converted to units of other arms, or were disbanded. The 24th Cavalry Division was inactivated on 6 October 1940, and was disbanded on 1 November 1940.

Reorganization of former 24th Cavalry Division units
Unit	Reorganized as
Headquarters	Disbanded 1 November 1940
Headquarters, Special Troops	Disbanded 1 November 1940
Headquarters Troop	Disbanded 1 November 1940
24th Signal Troop	Disbanded 1 November 1940
128th Ordnance Company (Medium)	Disbanded 1 November 1940
24th Tank Company (Light)	Disbanded 1 November 1940
57th Cavalry Brigade	Headquarters disbanded 15 September 1940; Headquarters Troop converted and redesignated as Service Company, 109th Quartermaster Regiment 16 September 1940
113th Cavalry Regiment	Relieved from assignment to division 16 September 1940
114th Cavalry Regiment	Converted and redesignated as 127th Field Artillery Regiment 1 October 1940 and relieved from assignment to division. Subsequently assigned to 35th Division.
58th Cavalry Brigade	Converted and redesignated as Headquarters and Headquarters Battery, 148th Field Artillery Regiment 1 October 1940 and relieved from assignment to division
115th Cavalry Regiment	Absorbed personnel from 24th Reconnaissance Squadron as a new 2nd Squadron 1 November 1940, and regiment concurrently relieved from assignment to division
116th Cavalry Regiment	Converted and redesignated as 183rd Field Artillery Regiment 16 September 1940 and relieved from assignment to division
24th Reconnaissance Squadron	Disbanded 26 October 1940 and personnel absorbed by 2nd Squadron, 115th Cavalry Regiment
168th Field Artillery Regiment	Relieved from assignment to division 1 November 1940
128th Engineer Squadron	Disbanded 1 November 1940
124th Medical Squadron	Disbanded 1 November 1940
124th Quartermaster Squadron	Disbanded 1 October 1940
120th Observation Squadron	Relieved from assignment to division 15 September 1940
