= 300th Field Artillery Regiment =

Field artillery regiment of the US Army

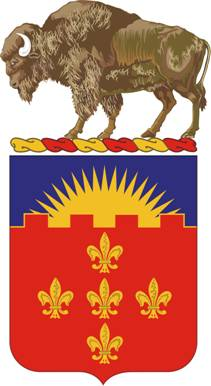
- Coat of arms
- Active: 1888
- Country: United States
- Allegiance: Wyoming
- Branch: Wyoming Army National Guard
- Type: Artillery
- Motto(s): POWDER RIVER
- Branch color: Scarlet
- Engagements: Spanish–American War; World War I Korean War

The 300th Field Artillery Regiment is a field artillery regiment of the United States Army.

== Lineage ==
- Parent unit organized in the Wyoming National Guard in 1888 as the 1st Regiment, to consist of Troop A, at Laramie, and Troop B, at Cheyenne.
- Redesignated in 1890 as the 1st Regiment, Infantry.
- Mustered into federal service 7–10 May 1898 at Cheyenne as the 1st Battalion, Wyoming Volunteer Infantry for service in the Philippine Islands. Mustered out 23 September 1899 at San Francisco, California.
- Reorganized in late 1899 as the 2nd Regiment Infantry. Redesignated in 1903 as the 3rd Regiment, Infantry. Reorganized and redesignated 29 April 1915 into the 1st Separate Battalion, 2nd Separate Battalion, and Separate Company.
- 1st and 2nd Separate Battalions mustered into federal service 4 July 1916 at Cheyenne for Mexican border duty. Provisional Regiment of Infantry organized in November 1916 from the 1st and 2nd Battalions. Mustered out of federal service 9 March 1917 at Fort D.A. Russell. Wyoming.
- 1st and 2nd Separate Battalions and Separate Company consolidated, reorganized and redesignated 23 June 1917 in the Wyoming National Guard as the 3rd Regiment, Infantry.
- Regiment (less 2nd Battalion) called into federal service 25 July 1917; 2nd Battalion called into federal service 25 March 1917 as the 2nd Separate Battalion. Entire regiment drafted into federal service 5 August 1917.
- Regiment broken up 19 September – 5 October 1917 and elements reorganized as part of the 41st Division:
  - 148th Field Artillery (Headquarters Company, Supply Company, 1st Battalion)
  - 116th Ammunition Train (2nd and 3rd Battalions)
  - 146th Machine Gun Battalion (Machine Gun Company)
- 148th Field Artillery demobilized in March 1919 at Camp Dix, New Jersey).

The 115th Cavalry was constituted in the National Guard in 1921, assigned to the 24th Cavalry Division, and allotted to Wyoming. The regiment was organized on 1 May 1922 by redesignation of the federally recognized elements of the 1st Regiment, Wyoming Cavalry. The 1st Squadron headquarters was organized at Cheyenne, Wyoming, and the 2nd Squadron headquarters at Sheridan, Wyoming. The regimental headquarters was organized on 24 January 1924 and federally recognized at Sheridan, relocating on 11 April 1924 to Cheyenne. Troop C at Riverton, Wyoming, was composed entirely of Sioux Indians. The 115th Cavalry reorganized on 1 June 1929 as a three-squadron regiment, with a new 3rd Squadron organized at Casper, Wyoming. Elements were called up to perform railway strike duty, 23 July – 27 August 1922, and strike duties near the Sheridan coal mines, August 1922. Troop I participated in the filming of the Columbia Pictures movie End of the Trail in 1932, while the entire regiment participated in the filming of the Paramount Pictures movie The Plainsman in 1936. The regiment conducted a 12-day mounted training march through the mountains between Sand Creek and Mountain Home in the summer of 1933, during which the regimental commander, Colonel Roche S. Mentzer, suffered a heart attack and died. Conducted summer training at Fort D.A. Russell from 1922 to 1937 and at Camp Guernsey, Wyoming, from 1938 to 1940. The 115th Cavalry was reorganized and redesignated the 115th Cavalry Regiment (Horse-Mechanized) on 1 November 1940 with the redesignation of the 24th Reconnaissance Squadron, 24th Cavalry Division, as the new 2nd Squadron. The regiment was concurrently relieved from the 24th Cavalry Division, and on 30 December 1940 was assigned to the IX Corps. It was inducted into active federal service on 24 February 1941 at Cheyenne and transferred on 10 March 1941 to Fort Lewis, Washington.

On 1 January 1944, the Headquarters and Headquarters Troop, 115th Cavalry Regiment was redesignated the 115th Cavalry Group, the 1st Squadron was redesignated the 115th Cavalry Reconnaissance Squadron, and the 2nd Squadron the 126th Cavalry Reconnaissance Squadron. While the 115th Cavalry Group, with the 106th and 107th Cavalry Reconnaissance Squadrons attached, served overseas in France and Germany, the 115th and 126th Squadrons never went overseas; the 126th was inactivated on 15 August 1944 at Fort Jackson, South Carolina, and the 115th was inactivated on 6 March 1945 at Camp Polk, Louisiana. The 115th Cavalry Reconnaissance Squadron was redesignated as the 300th Armored Field Artillery Battalion and allotted to the Wyoming National Guard 29 July 1946. Reorganized and federally recognized 30 January 1947 with headquarters at Sheridan.

- Ordered into active federal service 19 August 1950 at Sheridan. (300th Armored Field Artillery Battalion NGUS organized and federally recognized 1 October 1952 with headquarters at Sheridan)
- Released from active federal service and reverted to state control, 27 September 1954. Concurrently, federal recognition withdrawn from 300th Armored Field Artillery Battalion, NGUS.
- Consolidated with 49th Field Artillery Regiment (United States) 1 August 1959.

== Distinctive unit insignia ==
- Description

A Gold color metal and enamel device 1 5/32 inches (2.9 cm) in height overall consisting of a shield blazoned: Gules, five fleurs-de-lis Or one, three, and one, on a chief embattled Azure fimbriated of the second a demi-sun issuant of the like. Attached below the shield a Gold scroll inscribed “POWDER RIVER” in Blue letters.

- Symbolism

The red shield and the five gold fleurs-de-lis are for Artillery service in France. The chief is blue for Infantry service in the Philippines. The gold sun recalls both the Far Eastern service and the shoulder sleeve insignia of the 41st Division. The parting line is yellow for the Cavalry assignment of the regiment, and the line is made embattled recalling the fighting record of the old organization. The motto has been the battle cry and catch word of the regiment from its earliest days and through three wars.

- Background

The distinctive unit insignia was originally approved for the 115th Cavalry Regiment on 12 June 1924. It was redesignated for the 115th Cavalry Reconnaissance Squadron, Mechanized on 12 July 1944. The insignia was redesignated for the 300th Armored Field Artillery Battalion on 7 February 1952. It was redesignated for the 49th Artillery Regiment on 5 April 1961. It was redesignated for the 49th Field Artillery Regiment on 19 June 1972. It was redesignated effective 1 October 1996, for the 300th Field Artillery Regiment. The insignia was amended to correct the authorization of the insignia on 4 November 2004.

== Coat of arms ==
- Blazon
  - Shield: Gules, five fleurs-de-lis Or one, three, and one, on a chief embattled Azure fimbriated of the second a demi-sun issuant of the like.
  - Crest: That for the regiments and separate battalions of the Wyoming Army National Guard: From a wreath Or and Gules, an American bison statant Proper.
  - Motto: POWDER RIVER.
- Symbolism
  - Shield: The red shield and the five gold fleurs-de-lis are for Artillery service in France. The chief is blue for Infantry service in the Philippines. The gold sun recalls both the Far Eastern service and the shoulder sleeve insignia of the 41st Division. The parting line is yellow for the Cavalry assignment of the regiment, and the line is made embattled recalling the fighting record of the old organization. The motto has been the battle cry and catch word of the regiment from its earliest days and through three wars.
  - Crest: The crest is that of the Wyoming Army National Guard.
- Background: The coat of arms was originally approved for the 115th Cavalry Regiment on 9 June 1924. It was redesignated for the 115th Cavalry Reconnaissance Squadron, Mechanized on 10 July 1944. The insignia was redesignated for the 300th Armored Field Artillery Battalion on 7 February 1952. It was redesignated for the 49th Artillery Regiment on 5 April 1961. It was redesignated for the 49th Field Artillery Regiment on 19 June 1972. It was redesignated effective 1 October 1996, for the 300th Field Artillery Regiment. The insignia was amended to correct the authorization of the insignia on 4 November 2004.

== Campaign streamers ==
War with Spain

- Manila

Philippine Insurrection

- Manila
- Malolos
- Luzon 1899

World War I

- Champagne-Marne
- Aisne- Marne
- St. Mihiel
- Meuse-Argonne
- Champagne 1918

Korean War

- First UN counteroffensive
- CCF spring offensive
- UN summer fall offensive
- Second Korean winter
- Korea, summer fall 1952
- Third Korean winter
- Korea, summer 1953

== Decorations ==
- Presidential Unit Citation, (Army), Streamer embroidered HONGCHON
- Presidential Unit Citation, (Army), Streamer embroidered KUMSONG
- Meritorious Unit Commendation, (Army), Streamer embroidered KOREA 1952
- Meritorious Unit Commendation, (Army), Streamer embroidered KOREA 1952–1953
- Republic of Korea Presidential Unit Citation, Streamer embroidered KOREA 1950–1952
- Republic of Korea Presidential Unit Citation, Streamer embroidered KOREA 1952

== See also ==
- 24th Cavalry Division (United States)
- Field Artillery Branch (United States)
