= Camp Rapid =

Army National Guard installation in South Dakota, US

Coordinates: 44°04′45″N 103°16′01″W

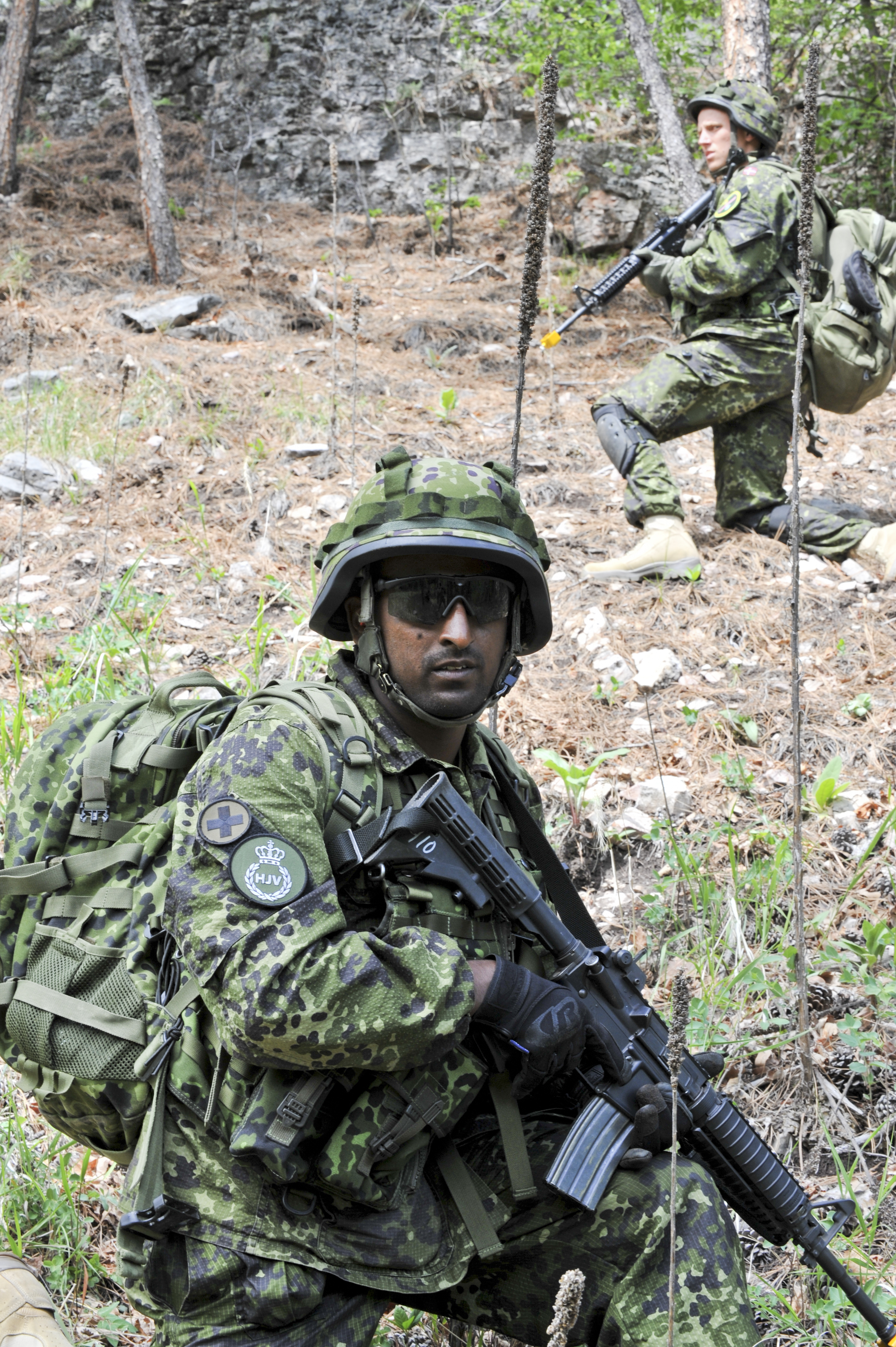
Danish Home Guard a combat patrol training exercise at West Camp Rapid during the Golden Coyote training exercise June 12, 2012.

Camp Rapid is a South Dakota Army National Guard installation located in Westside, Rapid City, South Dakota, just inside the edge of the Black Hills. Although the South Dakota state capital is Pierre, South Dakota, the state's Adjutant General has his office and headquarters in Camp Rapid.

== Background ==
Camp Rapid developed as a summer encampment site for the South Dakota National Guard in the early 20th century, using land borrowed from the Bureau of Indian Affairs "Sioux Sanitorium" and Rapid City Indian School, today's Indian Health Service (IHS) SiouxSan Hospital, located just west of Camp Rapid. It became a permanent installation during and immediately after World War I, when it was used for mobilization of National Guard units for the front in France. Its use continued during the 1920s and 1930s, and it was taken over as a federal installation during World War II. Permanent and temporary buildings erected during World War II continue in use today.

During the Cold War, Camp Rapid continued to host and support National Guard activities, including a series of annual exercises involving National Guard troops from many states conducting operations in the Black Hills. In the early 1990s, a new series of building projects replaced tent pads and brick and metal "tents" with permanent structures for use as armories, barracks, and support facilities. Security of the Camp was upgraded significantly in the early 2000s as part of nationwide security improvements. While small, the camp is a showcase for the National Guard and one of three active, manned military installations remaining in the Black Hills, and one of four in South Dakota.

== See also ==
- Ellsworth Air Force Base
- Fort Meade (South Dakota)
- Joe Foss Field
