= 196th Maneuver Enhancement Brigade =

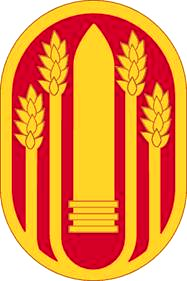
- Active: 1978 - present
- Country: United States
- Branch: United States Army National Guard
- Role: Maneuver Enhancement
- Size: Brigade
- Part of: South Dakota Army National Guard
- Garrison/HQ: Sioux Falls Armory, Sioux Falls, S.D.
- Motto: We Serve Proudly
- Website: https://www.facebook.com/196th.MEB/

Commanders
- Current commander: Col. Tracy L. Graves

Insignia
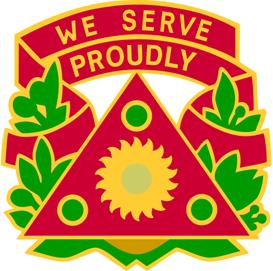
- 196th Maneuver Enhancement Brigade DUI

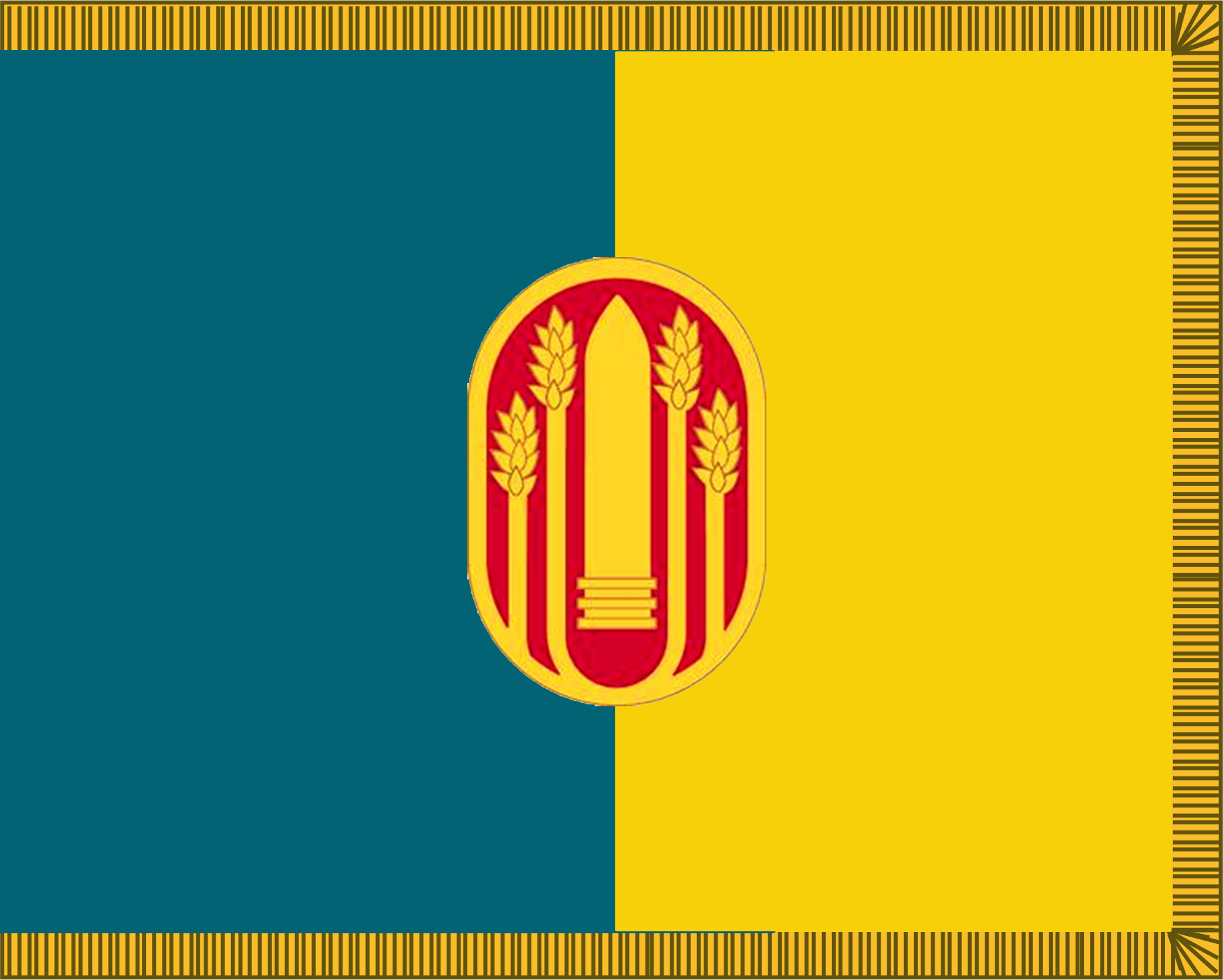
- 196th Maneuver Enhancement Brigade Flag

The 196th Maneuver Enhancement Brigade is a unit of the South Dakota National Guard since September 2009. The unit bears the lineage of the 147th Field Artillery Brigade which was organized in May 1978 at Pierre, S.D. The unit moved to Sioux Falls in 1993. The unit became the 196th MEB in September 2009.

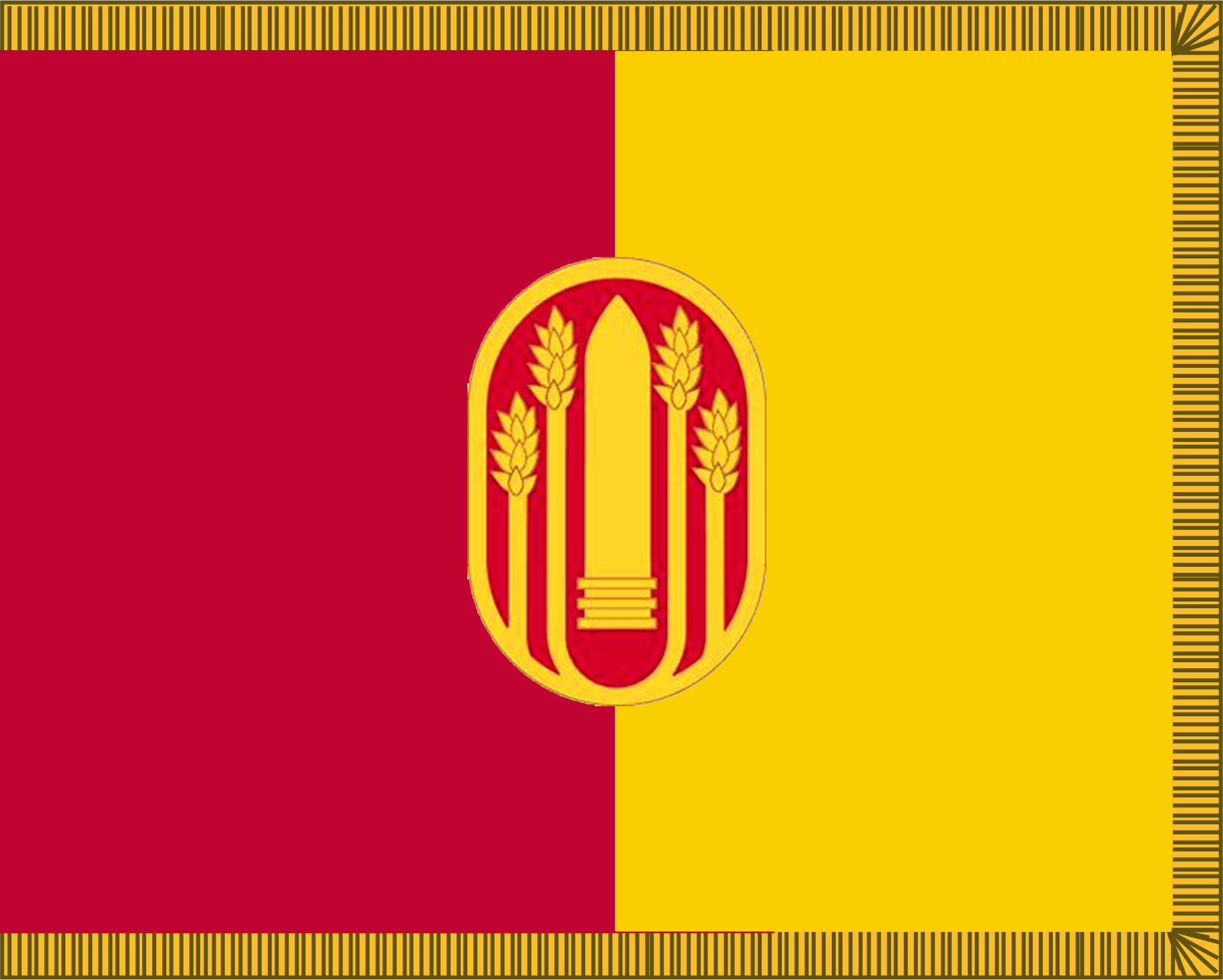
147th Field Artillery Brigade Flag

In 2010-2011, the 196 MEB was deployed to Camp Phoenix in Kabul Afghanistan providing resource management, sustainment support and construction oversight.

== Subordinate Units ==
- 1st Battalion, 147th Field Artillery Regiment Watertown Readiness Center | Watertown
  - Headquarters and Headquarters Battery
  - Battery A Charles J. Milbrandt Armed Forces Reserve Center | Aberdeen
  - Battery B Yankton Armory | Yankton
  - 147th Forward Support Company (Attached) Mitchell Armory | Mitchell
- 153rd Engineer Battalion Huron Armory | Huron
  - Headquarters and Headquarters Company
  - Forward Support Company Parkston Armory | Parkston
  - 155th Engineer Company Range Road Armory | Rapid City
  - 200th Engineer Company Pierre Armory | Pierre
  - 211th Engineer Company Madison Armory | Madison
  - 842nd Engineer Company Spearfish Armory | Spearfish
  - 927th Engineer Detachment Sioux Falls Armory | Sioux Falls
