= USS Logan =

1944 Haskell-class American attack transport

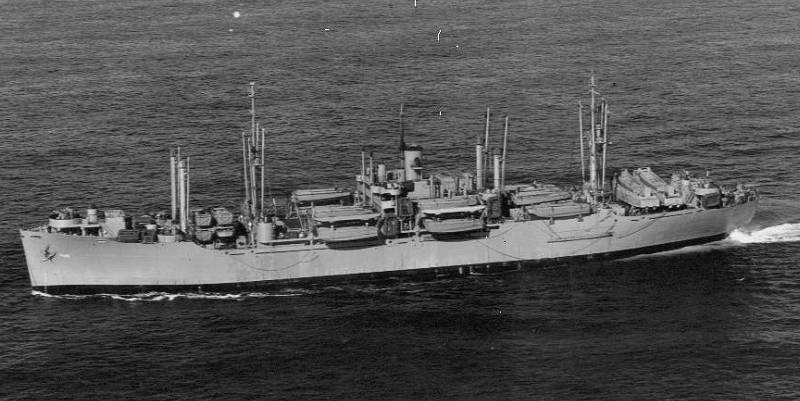
- USS Logan (APA-196)

History

United States
- Name: USS Logan
- Namesake: Logan County, Colorado; Logan County, Illinois; Logan County, Kansas; Logan County, Kentucky; Logan County, Ohio; Logan County, Oklahoma; Logan County, Nebraska; Logan County, North Dakota; Logan County, West Virginia
- Builder: Kaiser Co., Vancouver, Washington
- Laid down: 27 May 1944
- Launched: 19 September 1944
- Commissioned: 14 October 1944
- Decommissioned: 27 November 1946
- Recommissioned: 10 November 1951
- Decommissioned: 14 June 1955
- Stricken: 1 July 1960
- Honors and awards: 2 battle stars (World War II); 1 battle star (Korea)
- Fate: Scrapped

General characteristics
- Class & type: Haskell-class attack transport
- Displacement: 6,873 long tons (6,983 t)
- Length: 455 ft (139 m)
- Beam: 62 ft (19 m)
- Draft: 24 ft (7.3 m)
- Propulsion: Oil-fired Steam Turbine; 1 Shaft
- Speed: 17 knots (31 km/h; 20 mph)
- Boats & landing craft carried: 26
- Complement: 56 Officers, 480 Enlisted
- Armament: 1 × 5-inch/38-caliber guns; 1 × quad 40 mm gun; 4 × twin 40 mm guns; 10 × single 20 mm guns

USS Logan (APA-196) was a Haskell-class attack transport of the United States Navy, named for counties in Colorado, Illinois, Kansas, Kentucky, Ohio, Oklahoma, Nebraska, North Dakota, and West Virginia. The Haskell-class design, United States Maritime Commission standard type VC2-S-AP5, is a sub type of the World War II Victory ship design.

The ship was laid down on 27 May 1944 by Kaiser Co., Vancouver, Washington; launched 19 September 1944; sponsored by Mrs. Paul E. Lattner; acquired by the Navy; and commissioned on 14 October 1944.

== Service history ==
=== World War II, 1944–1946 ===
After shakedown off Santa Barbara during November, the new attack transport steamed to Pearl Harbor for two months of rigorous training with Vice Admiral Richmond K. Turner's TF 51 in preparation for the assault on Iwo Jima. Departing Hawaii on 26 January 1945, the ship stopped at Saipan, to use that recently liberated rugged atoll for five more days of very realistic training. She left Saipan on 16 February and on the 19th sighted the lamb chop-shaped little island of Iwo Jima, outlined against the morning sky by the battleship barrage that had been pounding the Japanese stronghold for several days. Pulling to within 1,000 yards (900 m) of the volcanic beaches, Logan lowered all boats, completing the intricate operation in under 30 minutes. Immediately thereafter, the beachmasters, engineers, and quartermasters were quickly dispatched ashore. During the early afternoon of "D-Day", Logan began the daily routine that was to last for nine days; receiving casualties from the beach to be treated by the ship's medical department and meanwhile unloading the vital combat gear as rapidly as possible to the LSMs and LSTs waiting alongside.

For Iwo Jima the ship was assigned to the 23rd Marines of the 4th Marine Division. She landed Hq Company of the 133rd NCB on yellow beach D Day for Shore Party duty. Later, on 21 February, at 0445 hours, The Logan rammed the USS NAPA (APA-157) along frames 98–102. The impact resulted in a 15 foot long hull breach to the NAPA, and extended 10 feet beyond the turn of the bilge. With Minimal damage done to the Logan, she continued her service in Iwo Jima until she received her departure orders. With 200 wounded soldiers resting comfortably in sick bay, the ship departed Iwo Jima on 28 February. Stopping briefly at Saipan, she made Guam on 4 March and debarked the casualties. The next day she sailed back to Saipan to prepare for the assault on Okinawa.

Following three weeks of extensive rehearsals off Saipan and Tinian with Rear Admiral Wright's TG 51.2, Logan steamed to Okinawa to feint an assault on the southeastern coast on 1 April, diverting the enemy's attention from the real attack which was made successfully on the western coast during the same day. The same maneuver was again successful the following day. For the next six days, Rear Admiral Wright's group laid off Okinawa, fully prepared, if needed, to reinforce the gallant men already ashore. By 11 April the success of the campaign was assured, and the task group steamed back to Saipan.

Logan maintained her readiness with exercises off Saipan and in the New Hebrides. Leaving Nouméa, New Caledonia, on 17 July, the ship made the Marianas the 26th, embarked more, than 1,500 troops and 200 wounded from Saipan, Guam, and Tinian, and sailed for CONUS. She reached San Francisco on 13 August, two days before the Japanese surrender.

After V-J Day the tremendous job of occupying Japan and bringing home the veteran troops still faced the Navy. Consequently, Logan departed San Francisco on 23 August to embark troops at Pearl Harbor for occupation duty in Japan. She arrived at Honshū on 27 September. On 10 October she proceeded to the Philippines, thence to the Marshall Islands, embarking 1,932 for the passage home. The ship arrived Seattle on 27 October 1945.

In November and again in January 1946, Logan made "Magic Carpet" runs to the Philippines to bring the men home. She was released from "Magic Carpet" on 6 March, decommissioned on 27 November 1946, and joined the Pacific Reserve Fleet at San Francisco.

=== Korean War, 1951–1955 ===
Logan recommissioned on 10 November 1951, during the height of the Korean War. After shakedown and refresher training off San Diego, the attack transport departed for Yokosuka, Japan, on 9 April 1952, and arrived 26 April. Three weeks later she moved to Sasebo on the west coast of Japan. From there the ship made a quick 200-mile (300 km) cargo run to Koje-do Harbor, Korea, on 19 May, and returned to Sasebo the next morning.

On 25 June, after returning from Hong Kong, the ship left Sasebo for landing exercises at Inchon, scene of the brilliant amphibious assault during October 1950. Following realistic training in this setting, Logan proceeded to the west coast via Sasebo and Yokosuka. She arrived Long Beach on 24 August 1952.

Following nearly a year of amphibious operations, the ship again departed San Diego for Yokosuka on 3 July 1953, just after the s:Korean Armistice Agreement. She made Yokosuka on 25 July. During October she returned to Korea for extensive, month-long amphibious exercises at Inchon. For the next months she operated around Sasebo, then commenced roundabout passage home, stopping at Hong Kong, Manila, Guam, and Pearl Harbor. She arrived Long Beach on 23 April 1954.

During the remainder of 1954, Logan exercised with the amphibious forces off the west coast. In January 1955, she steamed to Seattle for inactivation. The ship decommissioned on 14 June 1955 and joined the Pacific Reserve Fleet at San Francisco. She was struck from the Navy List on 1 July 1960 and transferred to the Maritime Reserve Fleet at Suisun Bay, where she remained into 1969.

Logan received two battle stars for World War II service and one for Korean service.
