= Lectionary 196 =

Lectionary ℓ 196
- New Testament manuscript
- Text: Evangelistarion
- Date: 15th century
- Script: Greek
- Now at: Bodleian Library
- Size: 29 cm by 18 cm
- Hand: splendid

Lectionary 196, designated by siglum ℓ 196 (in the Gregory-Aland numbering) is a Greek manuscript of the New Testament, on paper. Palaeographically it has been assigned to the 15th century. Scrivener labelled it by 204^{evl}.

== Description ==
The codex contains lessons from the Gospels of John, Matthew, Luke lectionary (Evangelistarium), on 155 paper leaves (29 cm by 18 cm). The text is written in Greek minuscule letters, in one column per page, 26 lines per page.

There are daily lessons from Easter to Pentecost.

== History ==
Scrivener and Gregory dated the manuscript to the 15th century. Today it is dated by the INTF to the 15th century.

Nicolaus, a presbyter, wrote his name and date 1626 on leaf 1.

The manuscript was found in disorder.

It was added to the list of New Testament manuscripts by Scrivener (number 204). Gregory saw it in 1883.

The manuscript is not cited in the critical editions of the Greek New Testament (UBS3).

Currently the codex is located in the Bodleian Library (Canonici Gr. 119) at Oxford.

== See also ==
- List of New Testament lectionaries
- Biblical manuscript
- Textual criticism

== Bibliography ==
- Gregory, Caspar René (1900). Textkritik des Neuen Testaments, Vol. 1. Leipzig. p. 403.
