= AD 196 =

196 in various calendars
- Gregorian calendar: 196; CXCVI
- Ab urbe condita: 949
- Assyrian calendar: 4946
- Balinese saka calendar: 117–118
- Bengali calendar: −398 – −397
- Berber calendar: 1146
- Buddhist calendar: 740
- Burmese calendar: −442
- Byzantine calendar: 5704–5705
- Chinese calendar: 乙亥年 (Wood Pig); 2893 or 2686 — to — 丙子年 (Fire Rat); 2894 or 2687
- Coptic calendar: −88 – −87
- Discordian calendar: 1362
- Ethiopian calendar: 188–189
- Hebrew calendar: 3956–3957
- Hindu calendars
- Vikram Samvat: 252–253
- Shaka Samvat: 117–118
- Kali Yuga: 3296–3297
- Holocene calendar: 10196
- Iranian calendar: 426 BP – 425 BP
- Islamic calendar: 439 BH – 438 BH
- Javanese calendar: 73–74
- Julian calendar: 196; CXCVI
- Korean calendar: 2529
- Minguo calendar: 1716 before ROC 民前1716年
- Nanakshahi calendar: −1272
- Seleucid era: 507/508 AG
- Thai solar calendar: 738–739
- Tibetan calendar: ཤིང་མོ་ཕག་ལོ་ (female Wood-Boar); 322 or −59 or −831 — to — མེ་ཕོ་བྱི་བ་ལོ་ (male Fire-Rat); 323 or −58 or −830

Year 196 (CXCVI) was a leap year starting on Thursday of the Julian calendar. At the time, it was known as the Year of the Consulship of Dexter and Messalla (or, less frequently, year 949 Ab urbe condita). The denomination 196 for this year has been used since the early medieval period, when the Anno Domini calendar era became the prevalent method in Europe for naming years.

== Events ==
=== By place ===
==== Roman Empire ====
- Emperor Septimius Severus attempts to assassinate Clodius Albinus but fails, causing Albinus to retaliate militarily.
- Emperor Septimius Severus captures and sacks Byzantium; the city is rebuilt and regains its previous prosperity.
- In order to assure the support of the Roman legion in Germany on his march to Rome, Clodius Albinus is declared Augustus by his army while crossing Gaul.
- Hadrian's Wall in Britain is partially destroyed.

==== China ====
- First year of the Jian'an Era, during the reign of the Xian Emperor of the Han.
- The Xian Emperor returns to war-ravaged Luoyang and seeks the protection of warlord Cao Cao. He is advised to move the capital to Xuchang; the emperor becomes a pawn in the hands of the Chinese warlords.

==== Korea ====
- Naehae becomes king of Silla.

=== By topic ===
==== Religion ====
- A church council is held in Caesarea over the date of Easter.

== Births ==
- Cao Chong, son of Cao Cao (d. 208)

== Deaths ==
- Beolhyu, Korean ruler of Silla
- Cao Bao, Chinese general and governor
- Chizhi Shizhu Hou, Chinese puppet ruler (b. 150)
- Zhou Xin, Chinese official and politician
