= 49th Field Artillery Battalion (United States) =

- Active: 1933
- Country: United States
- Branch: Field Artillery Branch, United States Army
- Motto(s): Iterum iterumque (Again and again)

The 49th Field Artillery Battalion was a battalion of the Field Artillery Branch of the United States Army.

== Lineage ==
Constituted 1 October 1933 in the Regular Army as the 49th Field Artillery.

Redesignated as the 49th Field Artillery Battalion, assigned to the 7th Infantry Division, and activated at Fort Ord, California 1 June 1941.

Inactivated 20 July 1947 at Seoul, Korea.

Activated 20 March 1949 at Jimmachi, Honshu, Japan. (49th Coast Artillery Battalion consolidated with the 49th Field Artillery Battalion 28 June 1950).

Relieved from the 7th Infantry Division and inactivated in Korea 1 July 1957

Consolidated with the 44th Field Artillery, 7 November 1969.

== Coat of arms ==
- Shield

Per Chevron enhanced gules and argent, on the last a bear's head erased and incensed proper.

- Crest

None

- Background

The scarlet is the Field Artillery, The silver of the shield in conjunction with the scarlet is indicative of the preparedness of the battalion night and day. The firing functions are allegorically illustrated by the incensed bear's head, being representative of the state of activation, California, taken from the crest of that state.

== Campaign streamers ==
World War I

- St. Mihiel
- Alsace 1918
- Lorraine 1918

World War II

- Aleutian Islands (with arrowhead)
- Northern Solomons
- Eastern Mandates
- Leyte
- Ryukyus (with arrowhead)

Korean War

- UN defense
- UN offensive
- CCF intervention
- First UN counteroffensive
- CCF Spring offensive
- UN summer-fall offensive
- Second Korean winter
- Korea summer-fall 1952
- Third Korean winter
- Korea summer 1953

== Decorations ==
- Philippine Presidential Unit Citation, Streamer embroidered 17 OCTOBER 1944 TO 4 JULY 1945
- Republic of Korea Presidential Unit Citation, Streamer embroidered INCHON
- Republic of Korea Presidential Unit Citation, Streamer embroidered KOREA
