= 196th Ohio Infantry Regiment =

- Active: March 25, 1865, to September 11, 1865
- Country: United States
- Allegiance: Union
- Branch: Infantry

The 196th Ohio Infantry Regiment, sometimes 196th Ohio Volunteer Infantry (or 196th OVI) was an infantry regiment in the Union Army during the American Civil War.

== Service ==
The 196th Ohio Infantry was organized at Camp Chase in Columbus, Ohio, and mustered in March 25, 1865, for one year service under the command of Colonel Robert Patterson Kennedy.

The regiment left Ohio for Winchester, Virginia, March 26. It was assigned to 2nd Brigade, 2nd Provisional Division, Army of the Shenandoah. Performed duties at Winchester until July, then moved to Baltimore, Maryland, and served garrison duty there and at Fort Delaware until September.

The 196th Ohio Infantry mustered out of service September 11, 1865, at Baltimore, Maryland.

== Casualties ==
The regiment lost a total of 25 enlisted men during service, all due to disease.

== Commanders ==
- Colonel Robert Patterson Kennedy

== Notable members ==
- Colonel Robert Patterson Kennedy - U.S. Representative from Ohio, 1887-1891

== See also ==
- List of Ohio Civil War units
- Ohio in the Civil War
