= 196th Infantry Regiment (United States) =

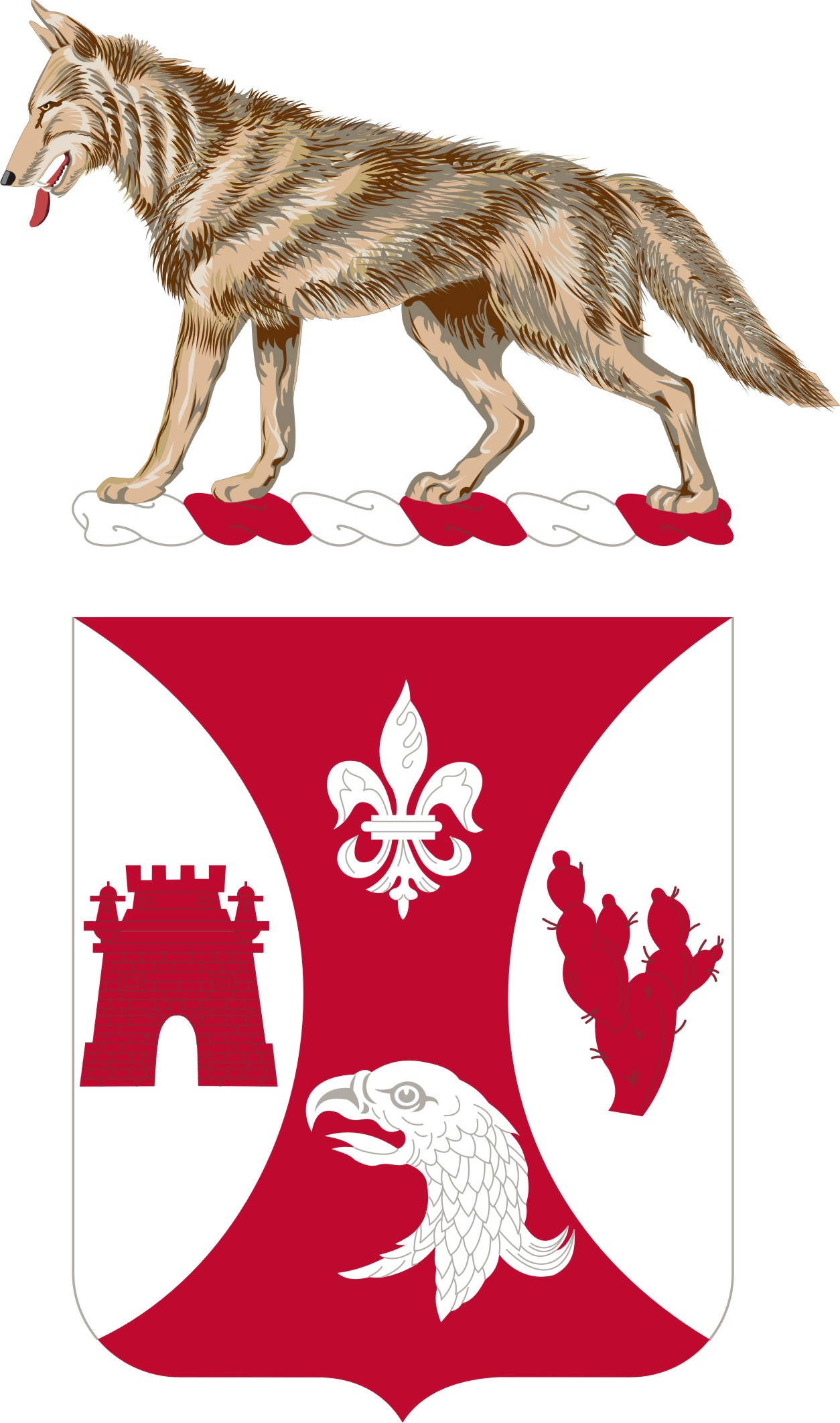
- Coat of arms
- Active: 1884-present
- Country: United States
- Allegiance: South Dakota
- Branch: South Dakota Army National Guard
- Type: Infantry
- Mottos: "Nunc et Semper" (Now and Always)

Commanders
- Current commander: Col. Scott Petrik

Insignia
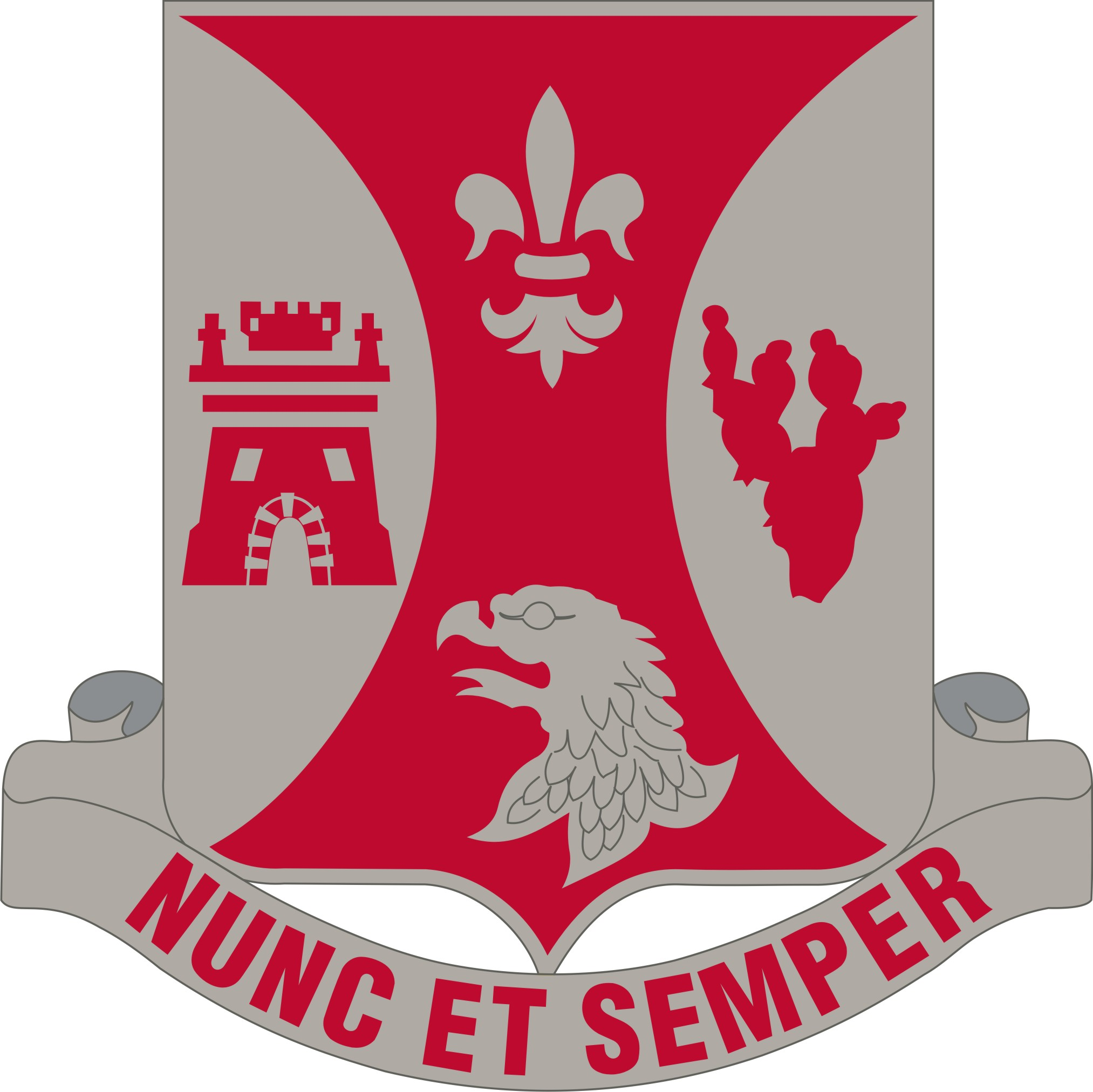
- Distinctive unit insignia

The 196th Infantry Regiment is an infantry regiment of the United States Army National Guard. It traces its lineage to units which have been both infantry and engineers.

== Lineage ==
Parent unit organized 1884-1885 as 2d Regiment, Dakota Territory. The organized militia of South Dakota was redesignated South Dakota National Guard 6 March 1893.

- Redesignated 9 September 1893 as the 1st Regiment, South Dakota National Guard. Mustered into federal service 12–19 May 1898 at Sioux Falls as the 1st South Dakota Volunteer Infantry and served in the Philippines; mustered out 5 October 1899 at the Presidio, San Francisco, California. Reorganize and redesignated 11 April 1901 as the 1st Regiment, South Dakota State Guard. 2d Regiment, South Dakota State Guard, organized August 1901- August 1902. 1st and 2d Regiments redesignated 17 March 1903 as 2d and 3d Regiments, South Dakota National Guard, respectively. Consolidated and redesignated 16 May 1905 as the 4th Infantry, South Dakota National Guard.

=== Mexican Border / World War I ===
- Mustered into federal service 30 June 1916 for Mexican Border and stationed at San Benito, Texas; mustered out 3 March 1917 at Fort Crook, Nebraska. Mustered into federal service 15 July 1917 at Aberdeen, drafted into federal service 5 August 1917. Converted and redesignated as the 147th Field Artillery and assigned to the 41st Infantry Division (United States) 3 October 1917. Relieved from the 41st Division and demobilized 23 May 1919 at Camp Dodge, Iowa.
- Reorganized in part and federally recognized 10 November 1922 as 2d Battalion, 136th Engineers with headquarters at Brookings (remainder of regiment reorganized as the 147th Field Artillery.) Expanded and redesignated as the 109th Engineers, assigned to the 34th Division and federally recognized 1 May 1924 with headquarters at Rapid City, South Dakota. Inducted into federal service 10 February 1941 at Rapid City.

=== World War II ===
- 1st Battalion relieved from the 34th Infantry Division (United States) and redesignated as 1st Battalion, 132d Engineers (Combat) 1 February 1942. Redesignated 1st Battalion, 132d Engineer Combat Regiment 1 August 1942. Reorganized and redesignated 5 April 1943 as the 132d Engineer Combat Battalion. Inactivated 31 January 1946 at Matsayama, Japan.

=== Post War ===
- Redesignated as the 196th Infantry, allotted to the South Dakota National Guard and assigned to the 196th Regimental Combat Team 24 June 1946.
- Organized and federally recognized 1 September 1947 with headquarters at Aberdeen. Ordered to active federal service 1 September 1950 at Aberdeen. Released from active federal service and to state control 10 October 1954.
- The unit was inactivated on 14 September 1956.
- In 1986, the regimental colors were uncased and the unit reactivated as the 196th Regiment (Regional Training Institute) at Fort Meade, South Dakota

== Distinctive unit insignia ==
=== Description ===
A Silver color metal and enamel device 1 1/8 inches (2.9 cm) in height overall consisting of a shield blazoned: Gules, in chief a fleur-de-lis, in base an eagle's head erased Argent, two flaunches of the last, the dexter charged with a castle, the sinister with a prickly pear cactus of the first. Attached below the shield is a Silver scroll inscribed "NUNC ET SEMPER" in Red.

=== Symbolism ===
The cactus is derived from the coat of arms of the 125th Field Artillery, the 109th and the 110th Engineers; the fleur-de-lis, from that of the same organizations; the eagle's head, from the 110th Engineers; and the castle, from the 125th Field Artillery. This arrangement indicates descent from all organizations, using the colors of the Engineer Corps representing original approval of the design as an Engineer unit. The motto translates to "Now And Always."

=== Background ===
The distinctive unit insignia was originally approved for the 132d Engineer Regiment on 3 October 1942. It was re-designated for the 132d Engineer Combat Battalion on 31 July 1943. It was re-designated for the 196th Infantry Regiment on 18 January 1951. The insignia was rescinded (cancelled) on 3 August 1961. It was reinstated and re-designated for the 196th Regiment with the description and symbolism revised on 24 February 1997.

== Coat of arms ==
=== Blazon ===
- Shield: Gules, in chief a fleur-de-lis, in base an eagle's head erased Argent, two flaunches of the last, the dexter charged with a castle, the sinister with a prickly pear cactus of the first.
- Crest: The 196th uses the crest for the regiments and separate battalions of the South Dakota Army National Guard. From a wreath Argent and Gules, a coyote statant, Proper.
- Motto: NUNC ET SEMPER (Now And Always).

=== Symbolism ===
- Shield: The cactus is derived from the coat of arms of the 125th Field Artillery, the 109th and the 110th Engineers; the fleur-de-lis, from that of the same organizations; the eagle's head, from the 110th Engineers; and the castle, from the 125th Field Artillery. This arrangement indicates descent from all organizations, using the colors of the Engineer Corps representing original approval of the design as an Engineer unit.
- Crest: The crest is that of the South Dakota Army National Guard.

=== Background ===
The coat of arms was originally approved for the 132d Engineer Regiment on 12 October 1942. It was redesignated for the 132d Engineer Combat Battalion on 31 July 1943. It was redesignated for the 196th Infantry Regiment and amended to delete the Missouri crest on 18 January 1951. The insignia was rescinded (cancelled) on 3 August 1961. It was reinstated and redesignated for the 196th Regiment with the blazon and symbolism revised on 24 February 1997.

== Campaign participation credit ==
Philippine Insurrection

- Manila
- Malolos

World War I

- Oise-Aisne
- Meuse-Argonne
- Lorraine
- Alsace
- Aise-Marne
- Champagne

World War II

- Western Pacific
- Leyte
- Ryukyus (with arrowhead)

== Decorations ==
- Philippine Presidential Unit Citation, Streamer embroidered 17 Oct 1944 to 4 Jul 1945. (132d Engineer Combat Battalion cited; DA GO 47,1950).
