= South Dakota National Guard =

State Militia of South Dakota

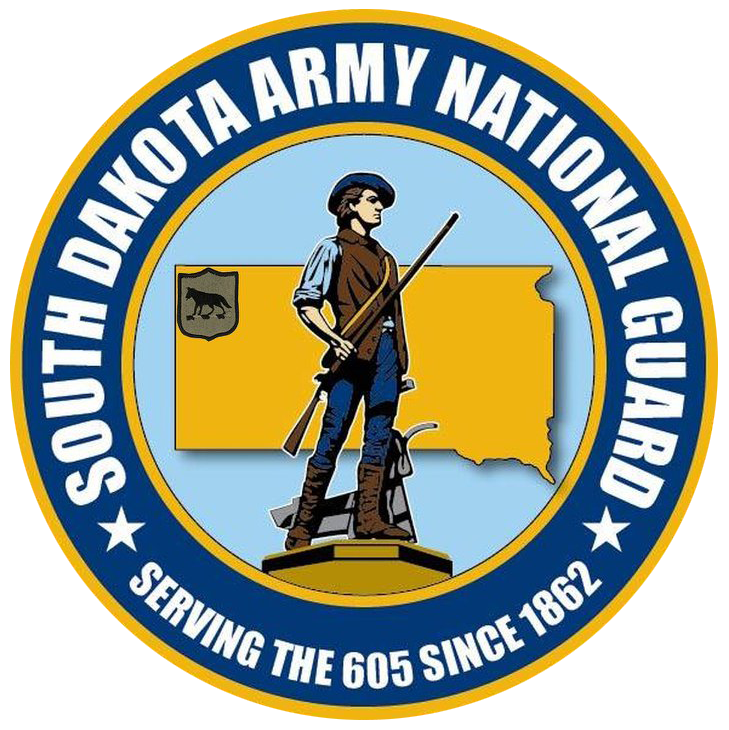
South Dakota Army National Guard logo

The South Dakota National Guard is part of the South Dakota Department of Military & Veterans Affairs. It was created in 1862 as the State Militia. Its headquarters is located in Rapid City, South Dakota. It consists of the South Dakota Army National Guard and the South Dakota Air National Guard.

The Guard in South Dakota was first activated 1862 by the territorial governor, and consisted of six companies of militia, composed of cavalry and infantry. In April 1898 the first infantry was federalized and deployed to the Philippines.

== South Dakota Army National Guard ==
The South Dakota Army National Guard maintains and operates 24 armories, and in 22 different communities. Major components of the SD ARNG include field artillery, engineer, transportation, aviation, maintenance and medical units.

During the War in Afghanistan (2001-2021), Operation Enduring Freedom, up until October 2008 the South Dakota Guard made the following deployments:

- 155th Engineer Detachment - Kuwait - June 2002/March 2003
  South Dakota Army National Guard
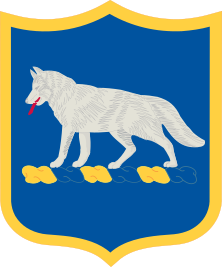
  - South Dakota Army National Guard STARC SSI
  - Active: January 27, 1862 - present
  - Country: United States
  - Allegiance: South Dakota
  - Branch: United States Army
  - Role: United States Army National Guard
  - Garrison/HQ: Rapid City, SD
  - Website: https://military.sd.gov/Default.aspx
  Commanders
  - Adjutant General of the South Dakota: MG Mark R. Morrell
  Insignia
  - South Dakota Army National Guard Crest
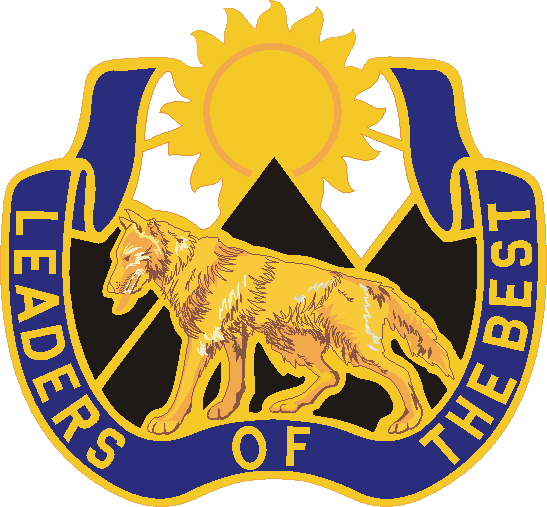
  - South Dakota Army National Guard STARC DUI
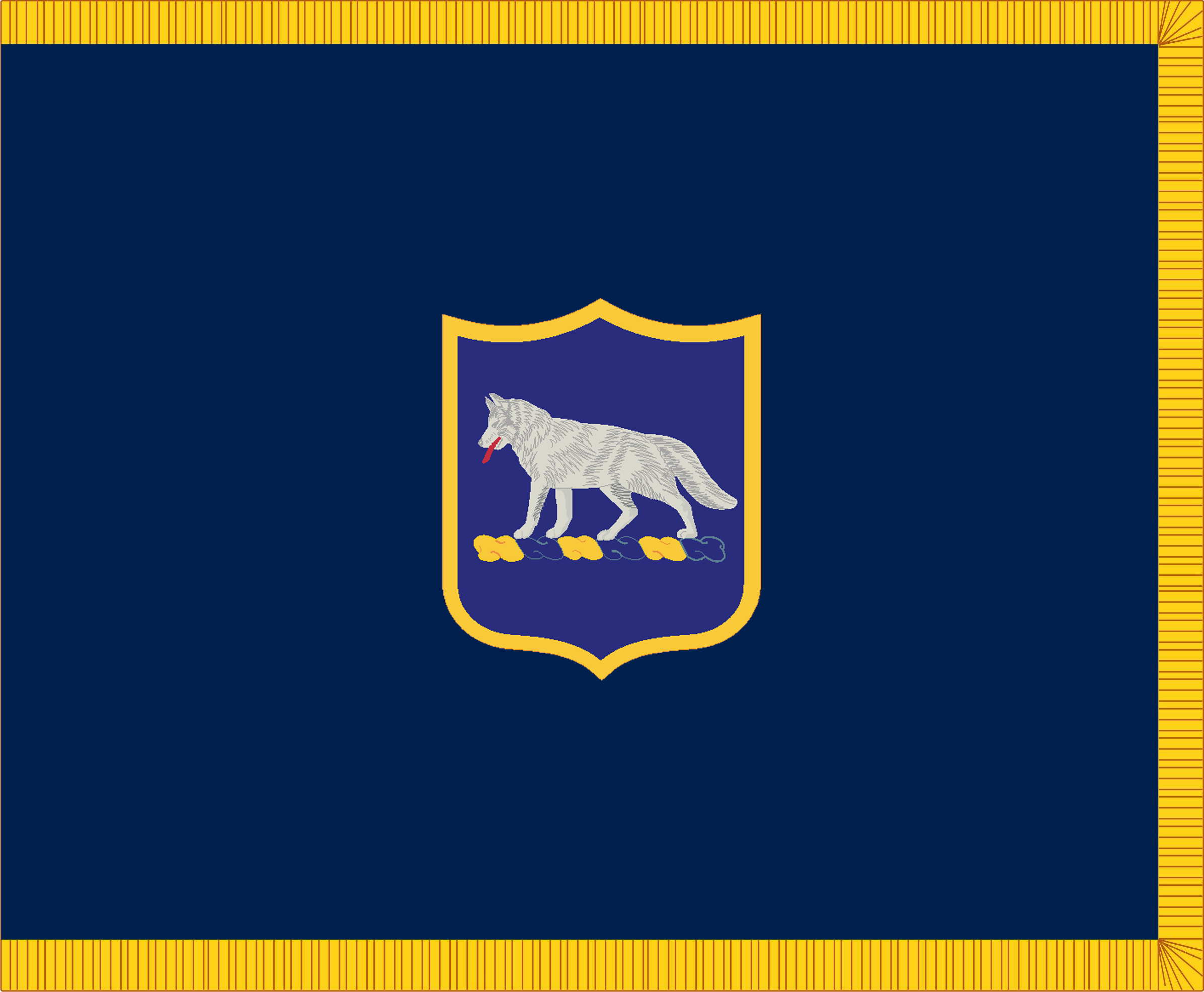
  - South Dakota Army National Guard Headquarters Flag
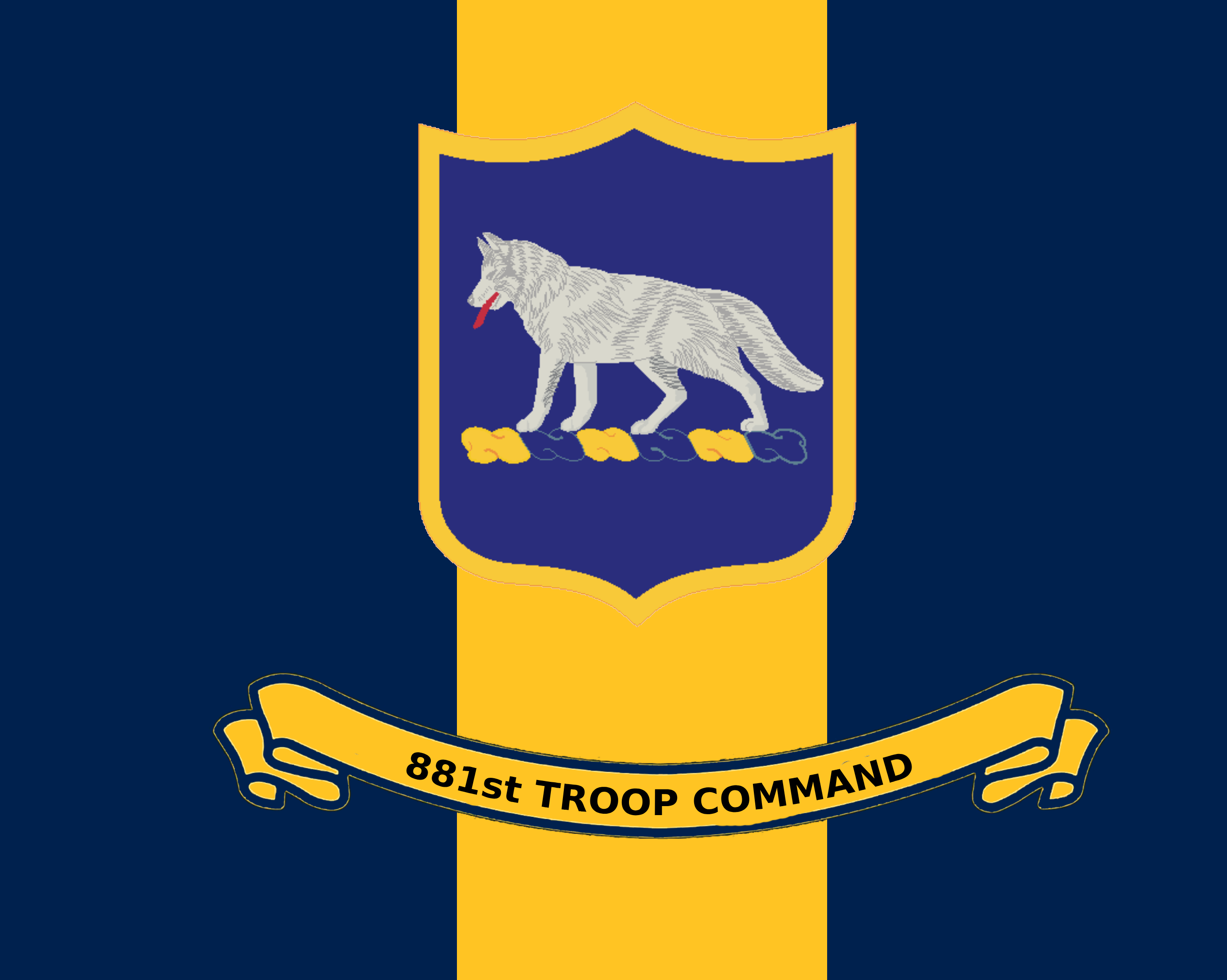
  - South Dakota Army National Guard 881st Troop Command Flag
- HHC, 109th Engineer Group - Afghanistan - April 2004/May 2005
- 147th Field Artillery Brigade - Afghanistan – June 2006/June 2007
- 129th Mobile Public Affairs Detachment - Afghanistan, Iraq, Qatar, Atlanta, Tampa – July 2006/June 2007
- 235th Military Police Company - Afghanistan – Oct. 2006/Jan. 2008
- 114th Security Forces Squadron - Kyrgyzstan – Feb. 2008/ Sept. 2008
- Det. 48, Operational Support Airlift - Afghanistan – Jan. 2008/ Aug. 2008
- S.D. Embedded Training Team - Afghanistan – Jan. 2008, currently deployed October 2008
- 211th Engineer Company (Sapper) - Possible deployment in summer 2009
- 196th Maneuver Enhancement Brigade _ Possible deployment in early 2010

After the 2006-07 deployment of the 147th Field Artillery Brigade to Afghanistan the brigade was converted and redesignated on 1 September 2009 as the 196th Maneuver Enhancement Brigade.

=== Major units ===
- Joint Force Headquarters
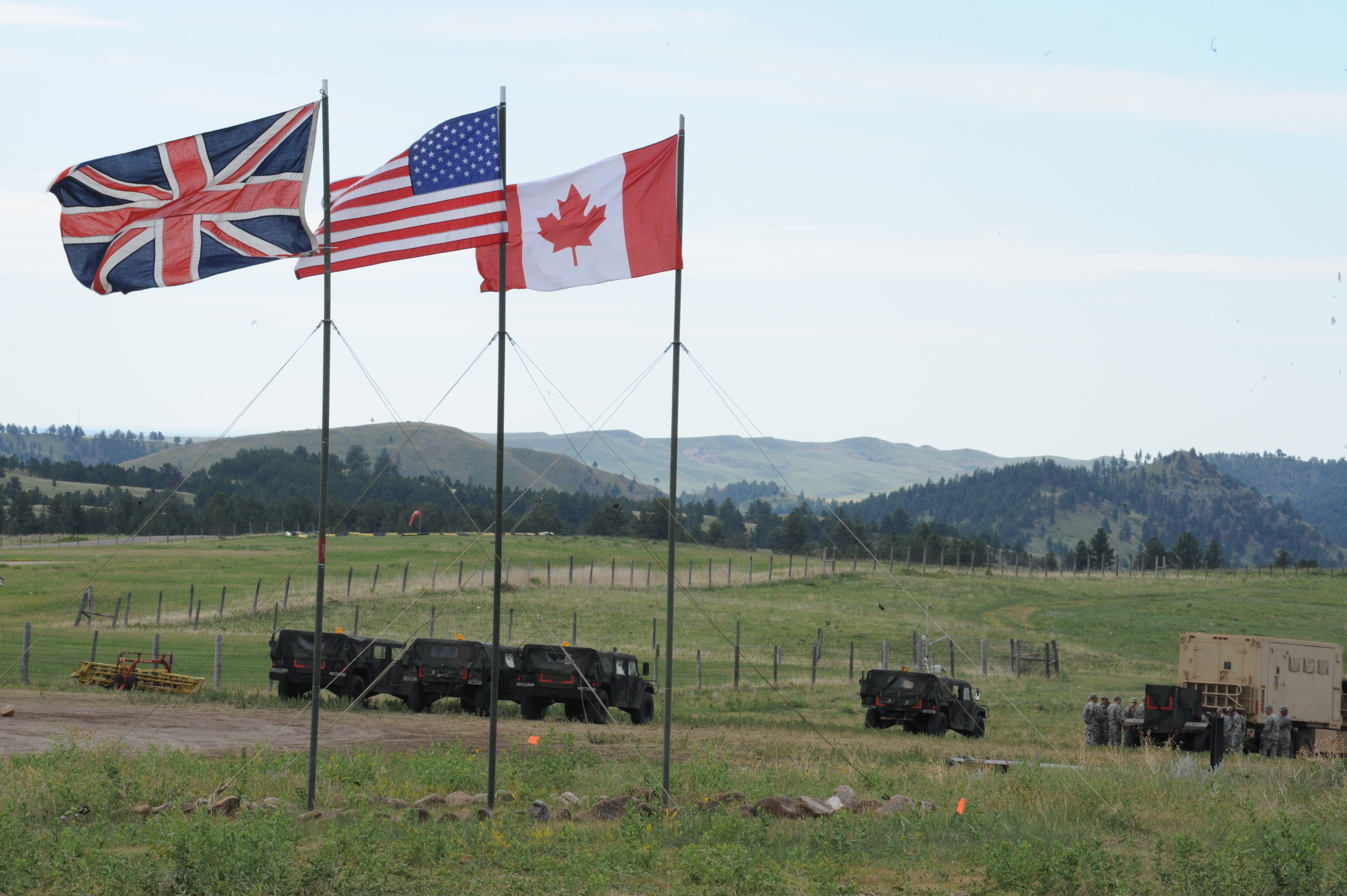
- Flags of the United Kingdom, United States, and Canada waving near the entrance to the South Dakota Army National Guard's Golden Coyote training site in Custer State Park in East Custer.
  196th Maneuver Enhancement Brigade, in Sioux Falls, South Dakota
  - 109th Engineer Battalion, in Sturgis, South Dakota
  - 153d Engineer Battalion, in Huron, South Dakota
  - 1st Battalion, 147th Field Artillery Regiment (M270A1 MLRS), in Watertown, South Dakota
    - Battery A
    - Battery B
    - Forward Support Company
  - 139th Brigade Support Battalion, in Brookings, South Dakota
- 109th Regional Support Group
- 152nd Combat Sustainment Support Battalion, in Brookings, South Dakota
  - 665th Maintenance Company (Surface)
  - 730th Medical Company (Area Support)
  - 740th Transportation Company
  - 1742d Transportation Company
- 881st Troop Command
  - 235th Military Police Company
  - 147th Army Band
  - Detachment 1, Company B, 1st Battalion, 112th Aviation Regiment
  - Company C, 1st Battalion, 189th Aviation Regiment
  - Detachment 2, Company D, 1st Battalion, 189th Aviation Regiment
  - Detachment 2, Company E, 1st Battalion, 189th Aviation Regiment
  - Detachment 5, Company C, 2d Battalion, 641st Aviation Regiment
  - Detachment 1, Company B, 935th Aviation Support Battalion (mobilizes with the Combat Aviation Brigade, 35th Infantry Division)
  - Detachment 48, Operational Support Airlift Command
  - 129th Mobile Public Affairs Detachment
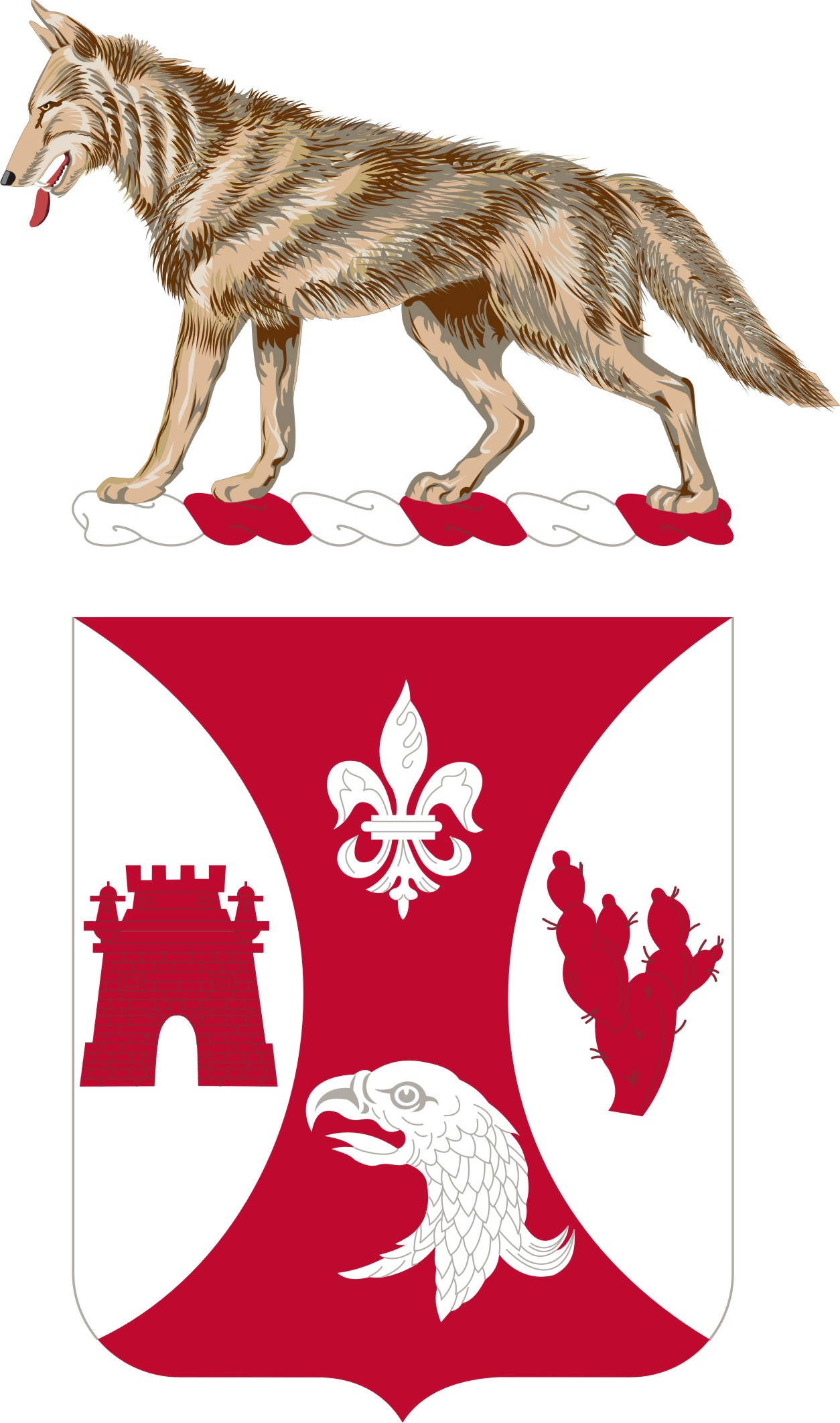
- 196th Regiment (Regional Training Institute)

== History ==
The South Dakota National Guard traces its history to the establishment of the Dakota Territory on March 2, 1861. Just prior to the establishment of the territory, in the 1850s, the U.S. Army had established garrisons at Fort Pierre and Fort Randall on the Missouri River. The U.S. Army detachments had been deployed to protect the settlers in Dakota from Native American tribes, but when the Civil War started, the U.S. Army withdrew most of its forces to put down the Confederate States of America. Because of this, the territorial governor William Jayne raised two companies of volunteer militia in December 1861, which were the predecessors of the South Dakota National Guard.

Since that historic date in 1862, the SDNG has seen combat during the Spanish-American War, World War I and II, Operation Just Cause and Operation Desert Storm. The National Guard was also called up during the Mexican Border Conflict, Korean War, Berlin Crisis and peacekeeping missions in Bosnia and Kosovo.

=== Historical units ===
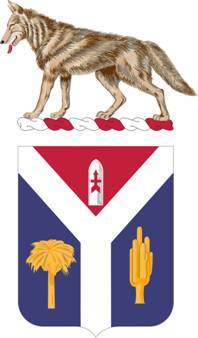
- 147th Field Artillery Regiment
- 132d Engineer Battalion
- 109th Engineer Regiment

In Jan. 2013, Charmaine White Face raised concerns about radiation exposure of South Dakota Army National Guard soldiers in the Buffalo Gap National Grassland.

== South Dakota Air National Guard ==
- South Dakota Air National Guard
  - 114th Fighter Wing

== Use of private funding for deployment ==
In June 2021, Governor Kristi Noem announced the deployment of up to 50 National Guard troops to the southern U.S. border to be funded by a private donor. The announcement was characterized as "unprecedented and unethical" by military and oversight experts.

== See also ==
- South Dakota State Guard
