= 1889th Regional Support Group =

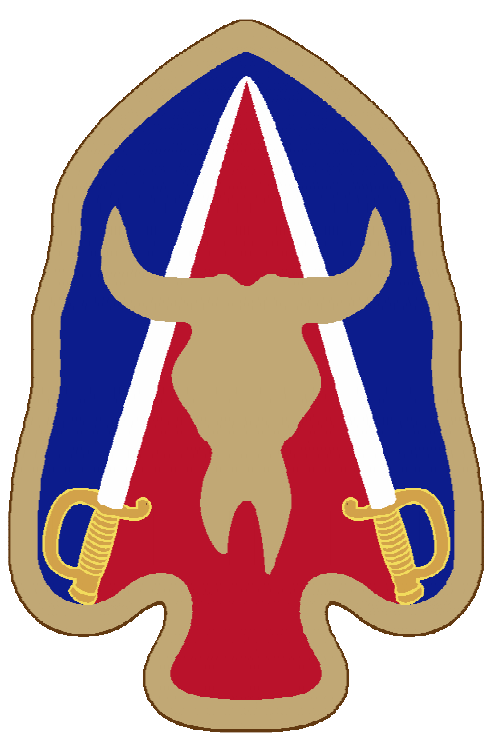
- Active: 2010 - present
- Country: United States
- Branch: United States Army National Guard
- Role: Support
- Size: Group (Brigade)
- Part of: Montana Army National Guard
- Garrison/HQ: Silver Bow Readiness Center, Butte, Montana
- Motto: Raise The Colors

Commanders
- Notable commanders: COL Trenton Gibson, COL Patrick Nugent

Insignia
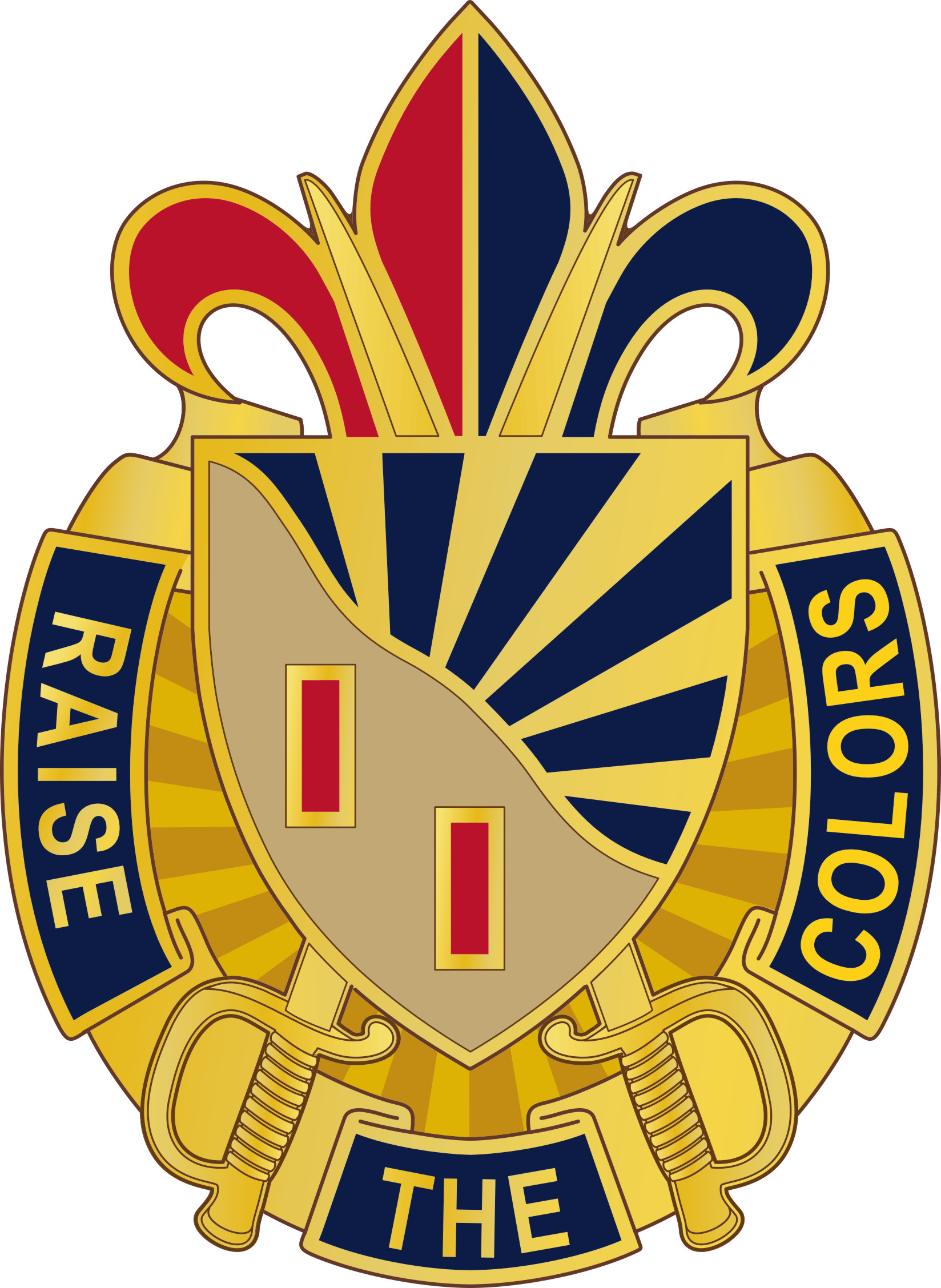
- 1889th RSG DUI

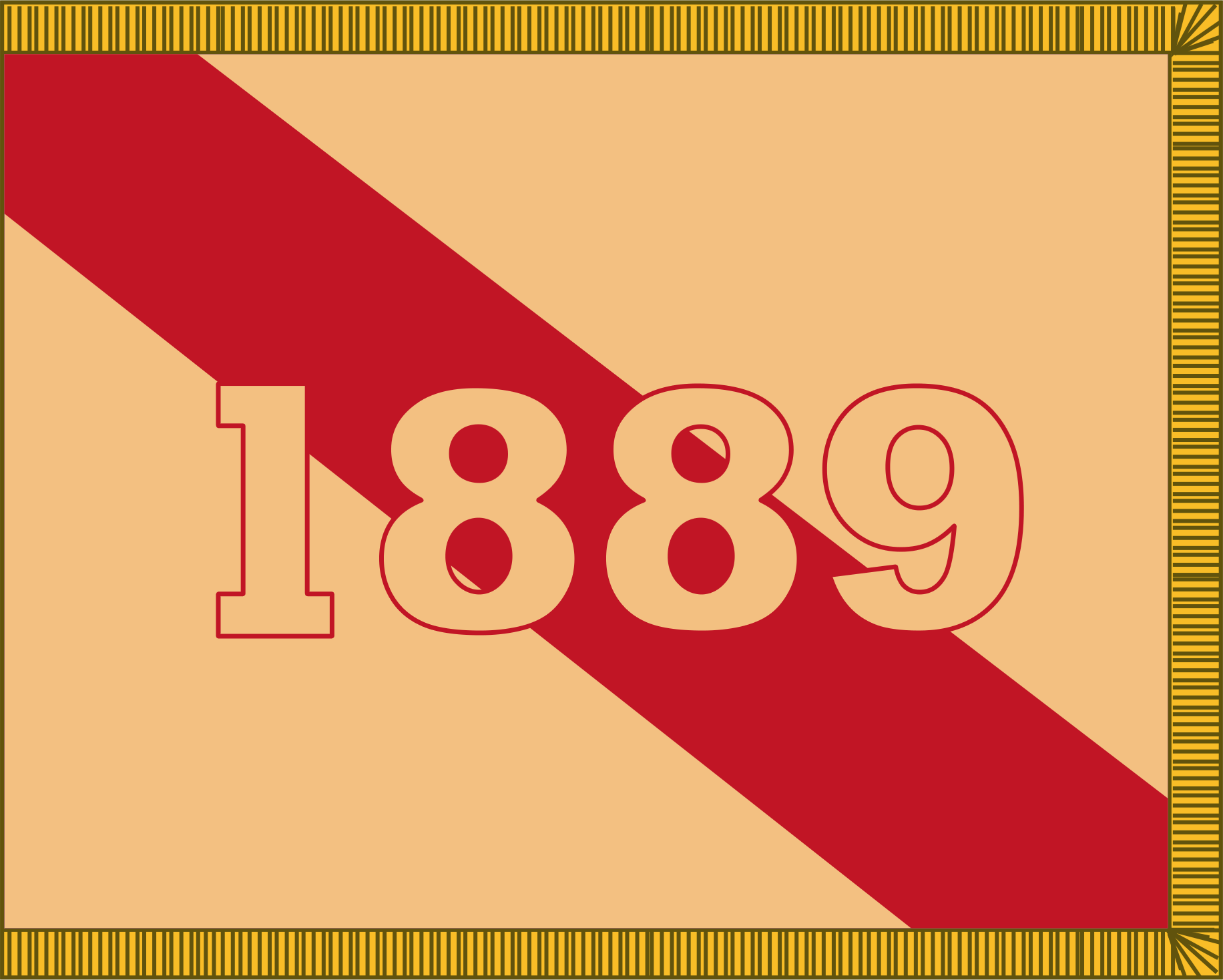
- 1889 Regional Support Group Flag

The 1889th Regional Support Group is a unit of the Montana Army National Guard stationed at the Silver Bow Readiness Center, Butte, Montana since 2010. The unit deployed in 2023 in support of the Global War on Terror as part of Operation Inherent Resolve, and was awarded the Meritorious Unit Commendation for its service.

On April 24, 2025, the 484th MP Company held a ceremonial patching ceremony where they changed their shoulder sleeve insignia from the 1889th Regional Support Group to the 95th Troop Command. This change reflects the company's shift to the 95th Troop Command.

== Units in 2026 ==
- 1889th Regional Support Group, in Butte
  - Headquarters and Headquarters Company, 1889th Regional Support Group, in Butte
  - 1st Battalion, 163rd Infantry Regiment, in Belgrade
    - Headquarters and Headquarters Company, 1st Battalion, 163rd Infantry Regiment, in Belgrade
    - Company A, in Billings
      - Detachment 1, in Belgrade
    - Company B, in Missoula
      - Detachment 1, in Kalispell
    - Company C, in Great Falls
    - Company I (Forward Support), 145th Brigade Support Battalion, at Fort William Henry Harrison
      - Detachment 1, in Livingston
  - 1st Battalion (General Support Aviation), 189th Aviation Regiment, at Helena Army Airfield
    - Headquarters and Headquarters Company, 1st Battalion, 189th Aviation Regiment, at Helena Army Airfield
    - Company A (Command Aviation Company), 1st Battalion, 189th Aviation Regiment, in Billings
    - Company B (Heavy Lift), 1st Battalion, 189th Aviation Regiment, at Reno Stead Airport (NV) (CH-47F Chinook helicopters) (Nevada Army National Guard)
      - Detachment 1, Company B (Heavy Lift), 1st Battalion, 189th Aviation Regiment, at Helena Army Airfield
    - Company C (MEDEVAC), 1st Battalion, 189th Aviation Regiment, at Rapid City Regional Airport (SD) (HH-60M Black Hawk) (South Dakota Army National Guard)
      - Detachment 1, Company C (MEDEVAC), 1st Battalion, 189th Aviation Regiment, at Helena Army Airfield
    - Company D (Aviation Unit Maintenance), 1st Battalion, 189th Aviation Regiment, at Helena Army Airfield
    - Company E (Forward Support), 1st Battalion, 189th Aviation Regiment, at Helena Army Airfield
    - Company F (Air Traffic Service), 1st Battalion, 189th Aviation Regiment, at Camp Ripley (MN) (Minnesota Army National Guard)
    - Company G (MEDEVAC), 1st Battalion, 189th Aviation Regiment, at McNary Airfield (OR) (HH-60M Black Hawk) (Oregon Army National Guard)
    - Detachment 1, Company C, 1st Battalion (Security & Support), 112th Aviation Regiment, at Helena Army Airfield (UH-72A Lakota)
    - Detachment 7, Company B, 2nd Battalion (Fixed Wing), 245th Aviation Regiment, at Helena Army Airfield (C-12 Huron)
    - Detachment 4, Company B (Aviation Intermediate Maintenance), 834th Aviation Support Battalion, at Helena Army Airfield
    - Detachment 41, Operational Support Airlift Command, at Helena Army Airfield
  - 190th Combat Sustainment Support Battalion, in Billings
    - Headquarters and Headquarters Company, 190th Combat Sustainment Support Battalion, in Billings
    - 143rd Military Police Detachment (Law Enforcement), in Lewistown
    - 260th Engineer Company (Engineer Support Company), in Miles City
      - Detachment 1, 260th Engineer Company (Engineer Support Company), in Culbertson (will close "before December 2026")
      - Detachment 2, 260th Engineer Company (Engineer Support Company), in Billings
    - 484th Military Police Company (General Support), in Malta
      - Detachment 1, 484th Military Police Company (General Support), in Glasgow
      - Detachment 2, 484th Military Police Company (General Support), in Billings
    - 1063rd Ordnance Company (Support Maintenance), in Billings
      - Detachment 1, in Dillon
  - 495th Combat Sustainment Support Battalion, in Kalispell
    - Headquarters and Headquarters Company, 495th Combat Sustainment Support Battalion, in Kalispell
    - 103rd Public Affairs Detachment, in Helena
    - 190th Chemical Reconnaissance Detachment, in Helena
    - Detachment 2, 230th Engineer Company (Vertical Construction Company), in Anaconda
    - 631st Chemical Company, in Missoula
    - 639th Quartermaster Company (Supply), in Havre
      - Detachment 1, in Libby
      - Detachment 2, in Kalispell
    - 1049th Engineer Detachment (Firefighter Tactical Group), in Helena
    - 1050th Engineer Detachment (Firefighter Tactical Group), in Helena
    - 1051st Engineer Detachment (Firefighter Tactical Group), in Helena
    - 1052nd Engineer Detachment (Firefighter Tactical Group), in Helena

== Operation Inherent Resolve ==
Since 2014, the United States, United Kingdom, and a coalition of other nations have supported the efforts of local allies to defeat ISIS in Iraq, Syria, and Libya. In 2023, the Unit was called up to support the Operation by assuming command and control over several support bases in Iraq, Syria, and Kuwait. In this role, the unit provided logistical and security coordination for coalition forces.

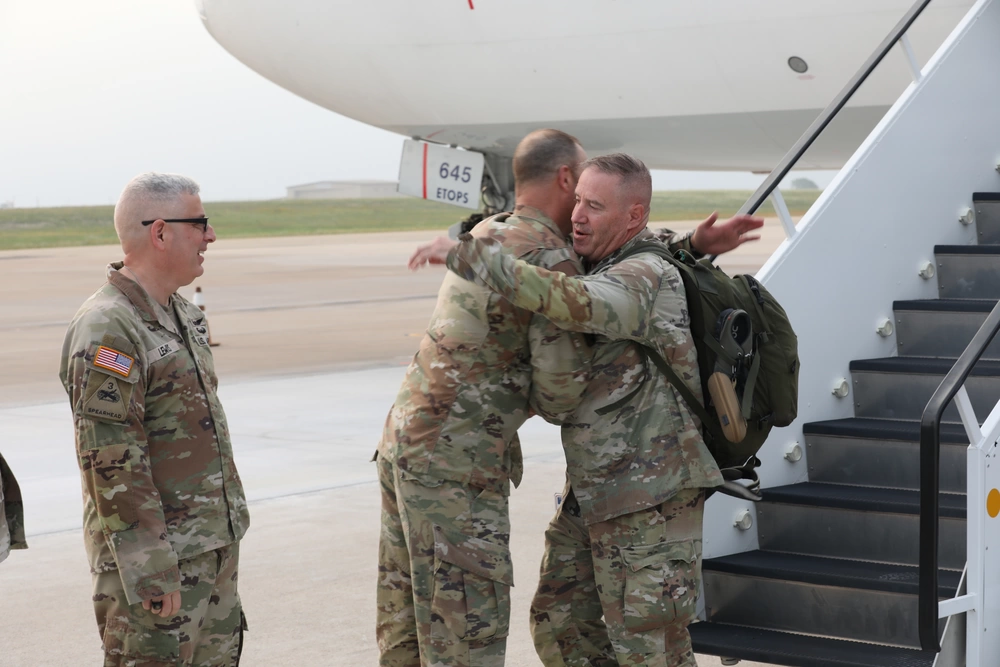
Soldiers of the 1889th return home from deployment

The unit returned to the United States in 2024.
