= 183rd Regiment =

183rd Regiment may refer to:

- 183rd Aviation Regiment, United States
- 183rd Cavalry Regiment, United States
- 183rd (Mixed) Heavy Anti-Aircraft Regiment, Royal Artillery
- 183rd Paratroopers Regiment "Nembo", Italy

== American Civil War regiments ==
- 183rd Ohio Infantry Regiment
- 183rd Pennsylvania Infantry Regiment

== See also ==
- 183rd Brigade (disambiguation)
- 183rd Division (disambiguation)
