= Combat Aviation Brigade, 34th Infantry Division =

34th Combat Aviation Brigade, 34th Infantry Division
- 34th Infantry Division's shoulder sleeve insignia
- Active: 1919–present
- Country: United States
- Branch: United States Army National Guard
- Type: Aviation
- Size: Brigade
- Garrison/HQ: St Paul, Minnesota
- Mottos: "Attack, Attack, Attack!"
- March: "March of the Red Bull Legions"
- Anniversaries: Organized: 30 January 1919
- Engagements: War on terror; Iraq War

Commanders
- Current commander: COL Kyle Liudahl

Insignia
- Distinctive unit insignia

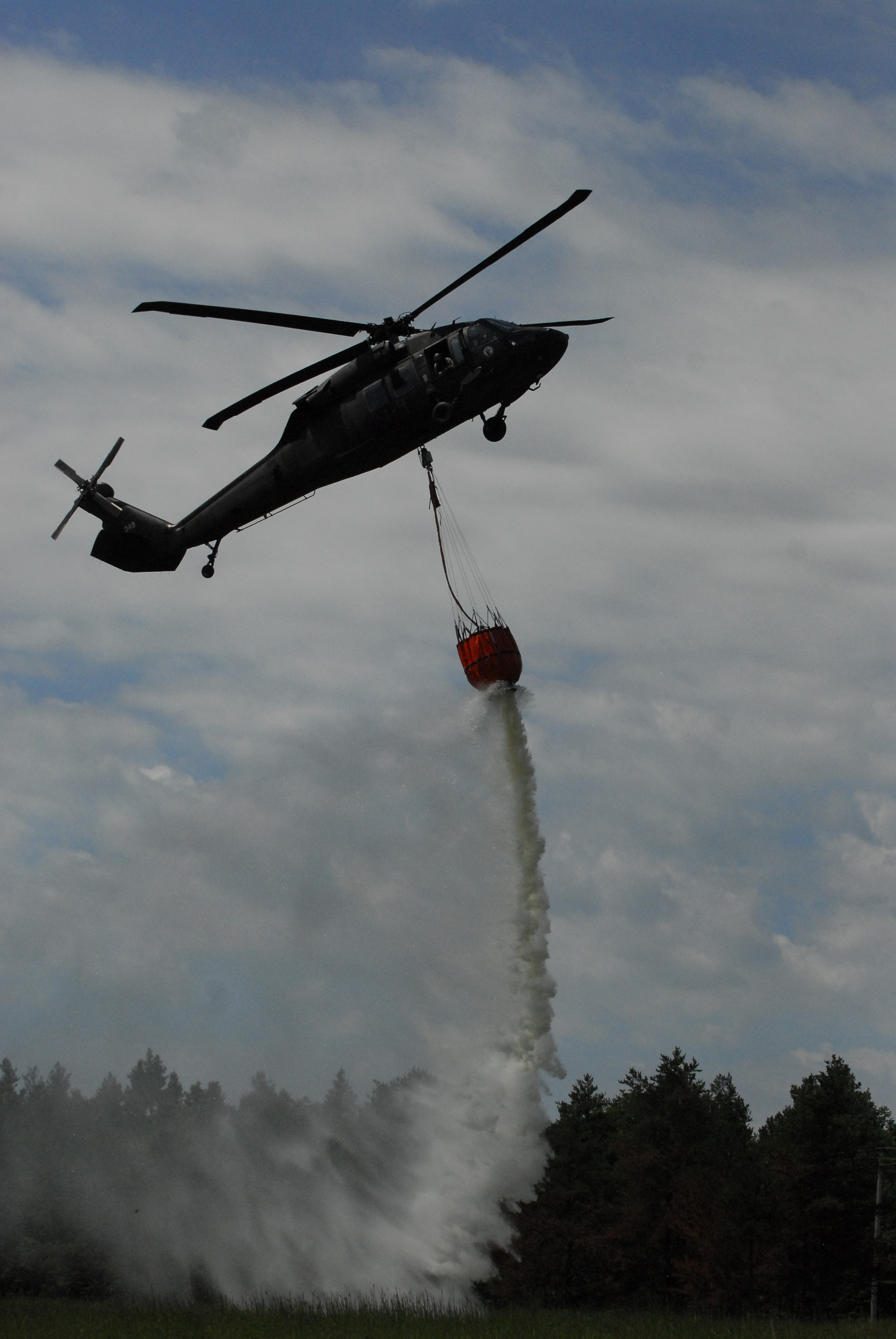
The annual training period of the Combat Aviation Brigade, 34th Infantry Division culminated with the Domestic Operations competition testing flight crew abilities at sling and water bucket operations 21 July 2010

The Combat Aviation Brigade, 34th Infantry Division is a Combat Aviation Brigade of the Minnesota National Guard and the United States Army. The brigade provides aviation capabilities to the state of Minnesota when in State Active Duty Status. The brigade is based in Saint Paul and uses UH-60 Black Hawk and CH-47 Chinook helicopters, and C-12 Huron fixed-wing aircraft for federal and state missions.

== History ==
On 1 April 1963, the 47th Aviation Company of the 47th Infantry Division (United States) was reorganized and redesignated as the Headquarters Company, 47th Aviation Battalion, an element of the 47th Infantry Division. It was reorganized and redesignated on 1 January 1965 as the Headquarters Detachment, 47th Aviation Battalion. It was reorganized and redesignated 1 June 1971 as Headquarters Company, 47th Aviation Battalion.

HQ Company, 47th Aviation Battalion was reorganized and redesignated 2 October 1986 as Headquarters and Headquarters Company, Aviation Brigade, 47th Infantry Division.

It was redesignated again on 10 February 1991 as Headquarters and Headquarters Company, Aviation Brigade, 34th Infantry Division.

In 2008-2009, more than 700 brigade soldiers deployed to Iraq and Afghanistan.

In 2010, the Saint Cloud-based Company B, 2d Battalion (General Support), 211th Aviation Regiment, departed in November for an Iraq War Operation New Dawn deployment. Flying CH-47 Chinook cargo helicopters, Company B moved troops, equipment, and supplies for maneuver, combat, and combat service support operations.

In May 2013, the brigade provided CH-47 and UH-60 helicopters and personnel to local government agencies to fight and contain three wildfires in northwest Minnesota. In 2013, the Combat Aviation Brigade welcomed home the St. Cloud-based Company C, 2d Battalion (General Support), 211th Aviation Regiment from a deployment in support of Operation Enduring Freedom where they conducted more than 650 medical evacuation missions and flew 1,700 accident-free flight hours. The company also received six new CH-47F Chinook helicopters and trained more than 30 personnel in their operation.

- June 2013 - the brigade took part in a full-spectrum Warfighter Exercise with the 40th Infantry Division at Fort Leavenworth. During this exercise, the brigade staff was able to successfully integrate with different levels of command and adjacent units.
- 2016 - The brigade consisted of Company A, 2nd Battalion (Assault Helicopter), 147th Aviation Regiment; Company B, 2nd Battalion (General Support), 211th Aviation Regiment; Company C, 2nd Battalion (General Support), 211th Aviation Regiment; Company F, 1st Battalion (General Support), 189th Aviation Regiment; Company C, 3rd Battalion (General Support), 238th Aviation Regiment; (HH-60) Company C, 1st Battalion (General Support), 171st Aviation Regiment; 834th Aviation Support Battalion;
- October 2019-October 2020 - the brigade deployed with nearly 700 Soldiers from Minnesota to command an aviation task force of over 1,400 Soldiers from the active component, Army Reserves, Army National Guard from ten different states, and coalition partners from Spain and Italy to the Middle East.

== Forces in 2023 ==
In 2023, the Minnesota-based subordinate units of the 34th CAB included:

- 2nd Battalion (Assault Helicopter), 147th Aviation Regiment
- Company B (Heavy Lift), 2nd Battalion (General Support Aviation), 211th Aviation Regiment
- Company C (MEDEVAC), 2nd Battalion (General Support Aviation), 211th Aviation Regiment
- 834th Aviation Support Battalion (834th ASB)

Outside Minnesota, in 2016-18 the 34th CAB was providing training and operational guidance to the:

- 1st Battalion (Surveillance and Security), 112th Aviation Regiment (ND ARNG)
- 1st Battalion (Attack Helicopter), 183rd Aviation Regiment (Idaho Army National Guard)
- 1st Battalion (General Support), 189th Aviation Regiment (Montana and Missouri Army National Guards)

== Leaders ==
Commanders
- COL Kyle Liudahl, 2024 – present
- COL Kevin O’Brien, 2021 – 2023
- COL Gregory D. Fix, 2018 – 2020
- COL Shawn P. Manke, 2015 – 2018
- COL Gregory A. Thingvold, 2012 – 2015
- COL Michael P. Huddleston, 2009 – 2012
- COL R. Clay Brock Jr., 2008 – 2009
- COL Ronald A. Neumeister, 2005 – 2007
- COL Mark C. Dugger, 2002 – 2005
- COL Daniel J. Morgan, 1999 – 2002
- COL Mathew Brockway
- COL Rick D. Erlandson, 1992 – 1996
- COL Steven E. DeMars, 1991 – 1992
- COL Ronald Sprengler
- COL Jerome C. Litschke

Command Sergeants Major

- CSM Shawn Schmidt, 2025 – present
- CSM Marc Dempsy, 2022 – 2024
- CSM Mitchell Hellcamp, 2017 – 2022
- CSM Stephen D. Cunnien, 2015 – 2017
- CSM James M. Kampsen, 2011 – 2015
- CSM Gery P. Thesing, 2006 – 2011
- CSM Gary C. Gustner, 2002 – 2006
- CSM Larry W. Helsene, ca. 1998 – 2002
