= Montana Army National Guard =

Component of the US Army and military of the U.S. state of Montana

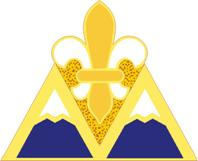
- Montana Army National Guard Headquarters DUI
- Active: 1867 - present
- Country: United States
- Allegiance: Montana
- Branch: United States Army
- Type: ARNG headquarters command
- Role: United States Army National Guard
- Part of: Montana National Guard
- Garrison/HQ: Helena, Montana

Insignia
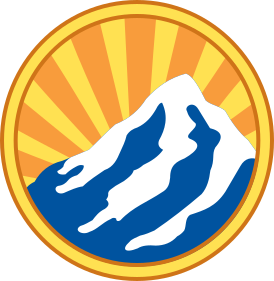
- Montana Army National Guard STARC SSI

- Montana Army National Guard Crest

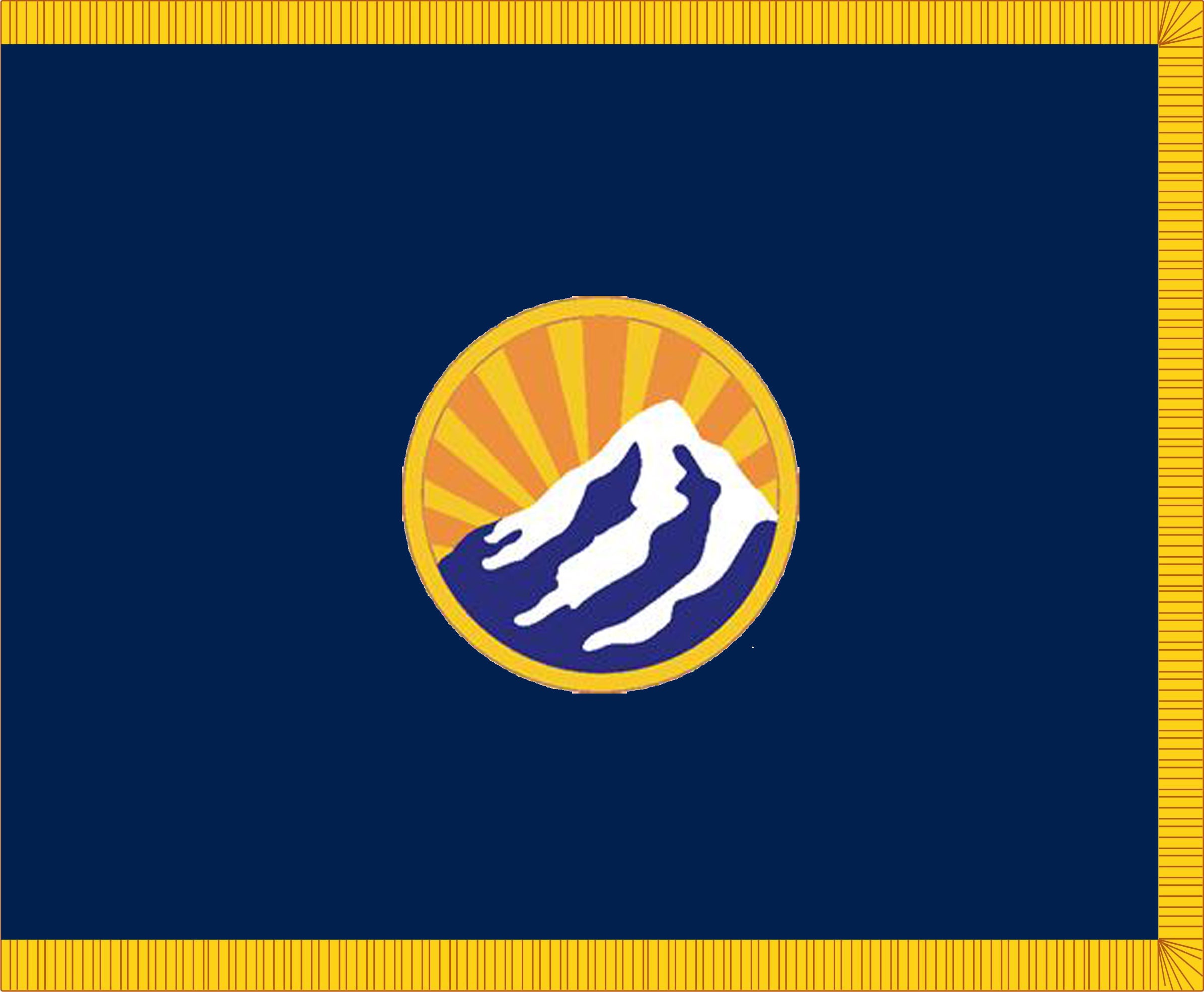
- Montana Army National Guard Headquarters Flag

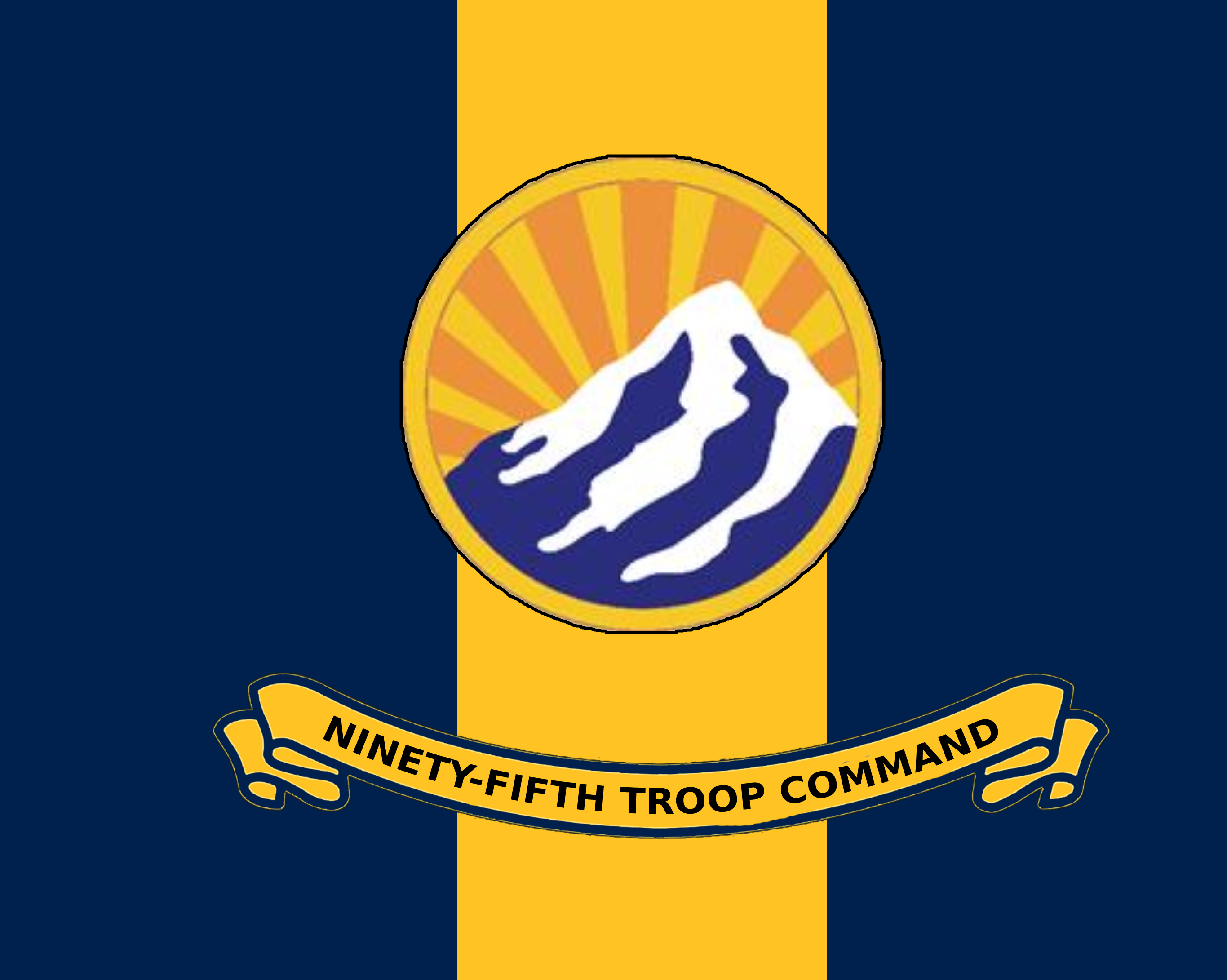
- Montana Army National Guard 95th Troop Command Flag

The Montana Army National Guard is a component of the United States Army and the United States National Guard. Nationwide, the Army National Guard comprises approximately one half of the US Army's available combat forces and approximately one third of its support organization. National coordination of various state National Guard units are maintained through the National Guard Bureau.

Montana Army National Guard units are trained and equipped as part of the United States Army. The same ranks and insignia are used and National Guardsmen are eligible to receive all United States military awards. The Montana Guard also bestows a number of state awards for local services rendered in or to the state of Montana.

The Montana Army National Guard maintains facilities in 28 communities.

== History ==
The Montana Army National Guard was originally formed in 1867. The 163d Infantry dates its history to independent companies grouped together around 1900. The Militia Act of 1903 organized the various state militias into the present National Guard system.

The 163rd Infantry Regiment of the Montana Guard formed part of the 41st Infantry Division, which fought through the Pacific during World War II. The Regiment was inducted into the Regular Army in September 1940, and were sent to Camp Murray at Fort Lewis, Washington. They participated in large-scale military exercises in California in 1941. On 7 Dec. 1941 small units were detailed to guard the Washington coastline from Japanese saboteurs. In March 1942 they were sent to Australia. Their engagements included the Battle of Buna-Gona in 1942–1943, the Salamaua-Lae campaign in 1943, Operations Reckless and Persecution and the Battle of Biak in 1944, and the liberation of the Philippines in 1945. In September 1945 the Regiment went ashore at Hiro, Japan as part of the occupation of that country. By this time most of the original Montanan troops had been discharged.

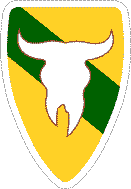
Shoulder sleeve insignia of the 163rd Armored Brigade

The Montana ARNG maintained the 163rd Armored Cavalry Regiment (whose roots date back to 1884), until 1988. In 1985 its units included the 1/163 Cavalry, the 2/163 Cavalry, the 3/163 Cavalry (based in Texas), an Air Troop, an Attack Helicopter Troop (based in Utah), and the 1063rd Engineer Company. The Montana units of the 163rd Armored Cavalry Regiment were converted and expanded into the 163rd Armored Brigade on 1 September 1988. The 3rd Battalion, 49th Field Artillery of the Wyoming Army National Guard became the brigade direct support artillery battalion. The 163rd Armored Brigade inactivated in 1997 due to budget cuts.

On the disbandment of the 163rd Armored Brigade, the 1st Battalion, 163rd Infantry was reassigned to the 116th Cavalry Brigade headquartered in Idaho. 'Commonly referred to as the Griz Battalion, the 1-163rd at first was designated as a Cavalry Regiment in 1953, named the 163rd Cavalry Regiment. The unit was renamed the 1-163rd Infantry Battalion during the 2006 reorganization of the Montana Army National Guard, and was re-designated as Cavalry once again in 2007, combining mechanized infantry with Abrams tank units.' In the 2006 reorganization, the 1st Battalion, 190th Field Artillery at Billings became the 190th Combat Service Support Battalion.

In April 2010, the 1st Battalion, 163rd Cavalry received mobilization orders and prepared to deploy to the Middle East for the second time in five years.

== Organization ==
As of January 2026 the Montana Army National Guard consists of the following units:

- Joint Force Headquarters-Montana, Army Element, at Fort William Henry Harrison
  - Headquarters and Headquarters Company, Joint Force Headquarters-Montana, Army Element, at Fort William Henry Harrison
  - Judge Advocate General, at Fort William Henry Harrison
  - Training Center (Garrison Command), at Fort William Henry Harrison
    - 900th Quartermaster Platoon (Field Feeding), at Fort William Henry Harrison
  - Army Aviation Support Facility #1, at Helena Army Airfield
  - Combined Support Maintenance Shop #1, at Fort William Henry Harrison
  - Unit Training Equipment Site #1, at Fort William Henry Harrison
  - Field Maintenance Shop #1, in Kalispell
  - Field Maintenance Shop #4, at Helena Army Airfield
  - Field Maintenance Shop #6, in Billings
  - Field Maintenance Shop #7, in Chinook
  - 95th Troop Command, at Fort William Henry Harrison
    - 83rd Civil Support Team (WMD), at Fort William Henry Harrison
    - Montana Recruiting & Retention Battalion, at Fort William Henry Harrison
    - Montana Medical Detachment, at Fort William Henry Harrison
  - 1889th Regional Support Group, in Butte
    - Headquarters and Headquarters Company, 1889th Regional Support Group, in Butte
    - 1st Battalion, 163rd Infantry Regiment, in Belgrade (part of 116th Cavalry Brigade Combat Team)
      - Headquarters and Headquarters Company, 1st Battalion, 163rd Infantry Regiment, in Belgrade
      - Company A (Mechanized Infantry), 1st Battalion, 163rd Infantry Regiment, in Billings
        - Detachment 1, Company A (Mechanized Infantry), 1st Battalion, 163rd Infantry Regiment, in Belgrade
      - Company B (Mechanized Infantry), 1st Battalion, 163rd Infantry Regiment, in Missoula
        - Detachment 1, Company B (Mechanized Infantry), 1st Battalion, 163rd Infantry Regiment, in Kalispell
      - Company C (Tank), 1st Battalion, 163rd Infantry Regiment, in Great Falls
      - Company I (Forward Support), 145th Brigade Support Battalion, at Fort William Henry Harrison
        - Detachment 1, Company I (Forward Support), 145th Brigade Support Battalion, in Livingston
    - 1st Battalion (General Support Aviation), 189th Aviation Regiment, at Helena Army Airfield
      - Headquarters and Headquarters Company, 1st Battalion (General Support Aviation), 189th Aviation Regiment, at Helena Army Airfield
        - Detachment 1, Headquarters and Headquarters Company, 1st Battalion (General Support Aviation), 189th Aviation Regiment, at Reno Stead Airport (NV) — (Nevada Army National Guard)
        - Detachment 2, Headquarters and Headquarters Company, 1st Battalion (General Support Aviation), 189th Aviation Regiment, at Rapid City Airport (SD) — (South Dakota Army National Guard)
        - Detachment 3, Headquarters and Headquarters Company, 1st Battalion (General Support Aviation), 189th Aviation Regiment, at McNary Airfield (OR) — (Oregon Army National Guard)
        - Detachment 4, Headquarters and Headquarters Company, 1st Battalion (General Support Aviation), 189th Aviation Regiment, at Kalaeloa Airfield (HI) — (Hawaii Army National Guard)
      - Company A (CAC), 1st Battalion (General Support Aviation), 189th Aviation Regiment, at Helena Army Airfield (UH-60L Black Hawk)
      - Company B (Heavy Lift), 1st Battalion (General Support Aviation), 189th Aviation Regiment, at Reno Stead Airport (NV) (CH-47F Chinook) — (Nevada Army National Guard)
        - Detachment 1, Company B (Heavy Lift), 1st Battalion (General Support Aviation), 189th Aviation Regiment, at Helena Army Airfield
      - Company C (MEDEVAC), 1st Battalion (General Support Aviation), 189th Aviation Regiment, at Rapid City Airport (SD) (HH-60M Black Hawk) — (South Dakota Army National Guard)
        - Detachment 1, Company C (MEDEVAC), 1st Battalion (General Support Aviation), 189th Aviation Regiment, at Helena Army Airfield
      - Company D (AVUM), 1st Battalion (General Support Aviation), 189th Aviation Regiment, at Helena Army Airfield
        - Detachment 1, Company D (AVUM), 1st Battalion (General Support Aviation), 189th Aviation Regiment, at Reno Stead Airport (NV) — (Nevada Army National Guard)
        - Detachment 2, Company D (AVUM), 1st Battalion (General Support Aviation), 189th Aviation Regiment, at Rapid City Airport (SD) — (South Dakota Army National Guard)
        - Detachment 3, Company D (AVUM), 1st Battalion (General Support Aviation), 189th Aviation Regiment, at McNary Airfield (OR) — (Oregon Army National Guard)
        - Detachment 4, Company D (AVUM), 1st Battalion (General Support Aviation), 189th Aviation Regiment, at Kalaeloa Airfield (HI) — (Hawaii Army National Guard)
      - Company E (Forward Support), 1st Battalion (General Support Aviation), 189th Aviation Regiment, at Helena Army Airfield
        - Detachment 1, Company E (Forward Support), 1st Battalion (General Support Aviation), 189th Aviation Regiment, at Reno Stead Airport (NV) — (Nevada Army National Guard)
        - Detachment 2, Company E (Forward Support), 1st Battalion (General Support Aviation), 189th Aviation Regiment, at Rapid City Airport (SD) — (South Dakota Army National Guard)
        - Detachment 3, Company E (Forward Support), 1st Battalion (General Support Aviation), 189th Aviation Regiment, at McNary Airfield (OR) — (Oregon Army National Guard)
        - Detachment 4, Company E (Forward Support), 1st Battalion (General Support Aviation), 189th Aviation Regiment, at Kalaeloa Airfield (HI) — (Hawaii Army National Guard)
      - Company F (ATS), 1st Battalion (General Support Aviation), 189th Aviation Regiment, at Camp Ripley (MN) — (Minnesota Army National Guard)
      - Company G (MEDEVAC), 1st Battalion (General Support Aviation), 189th Aviation Regiment, at McNary Airfield (OR) (HH-60M Black Hawk) — (Oregon Army National Guard)
        - Detachment 1, Company G (MEDEVAC), 1st Battalion (General Support Aviation), 189th Aviation Regiment, at Kalaeloa Airfield (HI) — (Hawaii Army National Guard)
      - Detachment 1, Company C, 1st Battalion (Security & Support), 112th Aviation Regiment, at Helena Army Airfield (UH-72A Lakota)
      - Detachment 7, Company B, 2nd Battalion (Fixed Wing), 245th Aviation Regiment (Detachment 41, Operational Support Airlift Activity), at Helena Army Airfield (C-12 Huron)
      - Detachment 4, Company B (AVIM), 834th Aviation Support Battalion, at Helena Army Airfield
    - 190th Combat Sustainment Support Battalion, in Billings
      - Headquarters and Headquarters Company, 190th Combat Sustainment Support Battalion, in Billings
      - 143rd Military Police Detachment (Law Enforcement), in Lewistown
      - 260th Engineer Company (Engineer Support Company), in Miles City
        - Detachment 1, 260th Engineer Company (Engineer Support Company), in Culbertson (will close "before December 2026")
        - Detachment 2, 260th Engineer Company (Engineer Support Company), in Billings
      - 484th Military Police Company (Combat Support), in Malta
        - Detachment 1, 484th Military Police Company (Combat Support), in Glasgow
        - Detachment 2, 484th Military Police Company (Combat Support), in Billings
      - 1063rd Ordnance Company (Support Maintenance), in Billings
        - Detachment 1, 1063rd Ordnance Company (Support Maintenance), in Dillon
    - 495th Combat Sustainment Support Battalion, in Kalispell
      - Headquarters and Headquarters Company, 495th Combat Sustainment Support Battalion, in Kalispell
      - 103rd Public Affairs Detachment, at Fort William Henry Harrison
      - 190th Chemical Reconnaissance Detachment, at Fort William Henry Harrison (supports 19th Special Forces Group (Airborne))
      - Detachment 2, 230th Engineer Company (Vertical Construction Company), in Anaconda
      - 631st Chemical Company, in Missoula
      - 639th Quartermaster Company (Supply), in Havre
        - Detachment 1, 639th Quartermaster Company (Supply), in Libby
        - Detachment 2, 639th Quartermaster Company (Supply), in Kalispell
      - 1049th Engineer Detachment (Fire Fighting Team — HQ), at Fort William Henry Harrison
      - 1050th Engineer Detachment (Fire Fighting Team — Fire Truck), at Fort William Henry Harrison
      - 1051st Engineer Detachment (Fire Fighting Team — Fire Truck), at Fort William Henry Harrison
      - 1052nd Engineer Detachment (Fire Fighting Team — Fire Truck), at Fort William Henry Harrison
  - 208th Regiment, Regional Training Institute, at Fort William Henry Harrison

Aviation unit abbreviations: CAC — Command Aviation Company; MEDEVAC — Medical evacuation; AVUM — Aviation Unit Maintenance; AVIM — Aviation Intermediate Maintenance; ATS — Air Traffic Service

== Duties ==
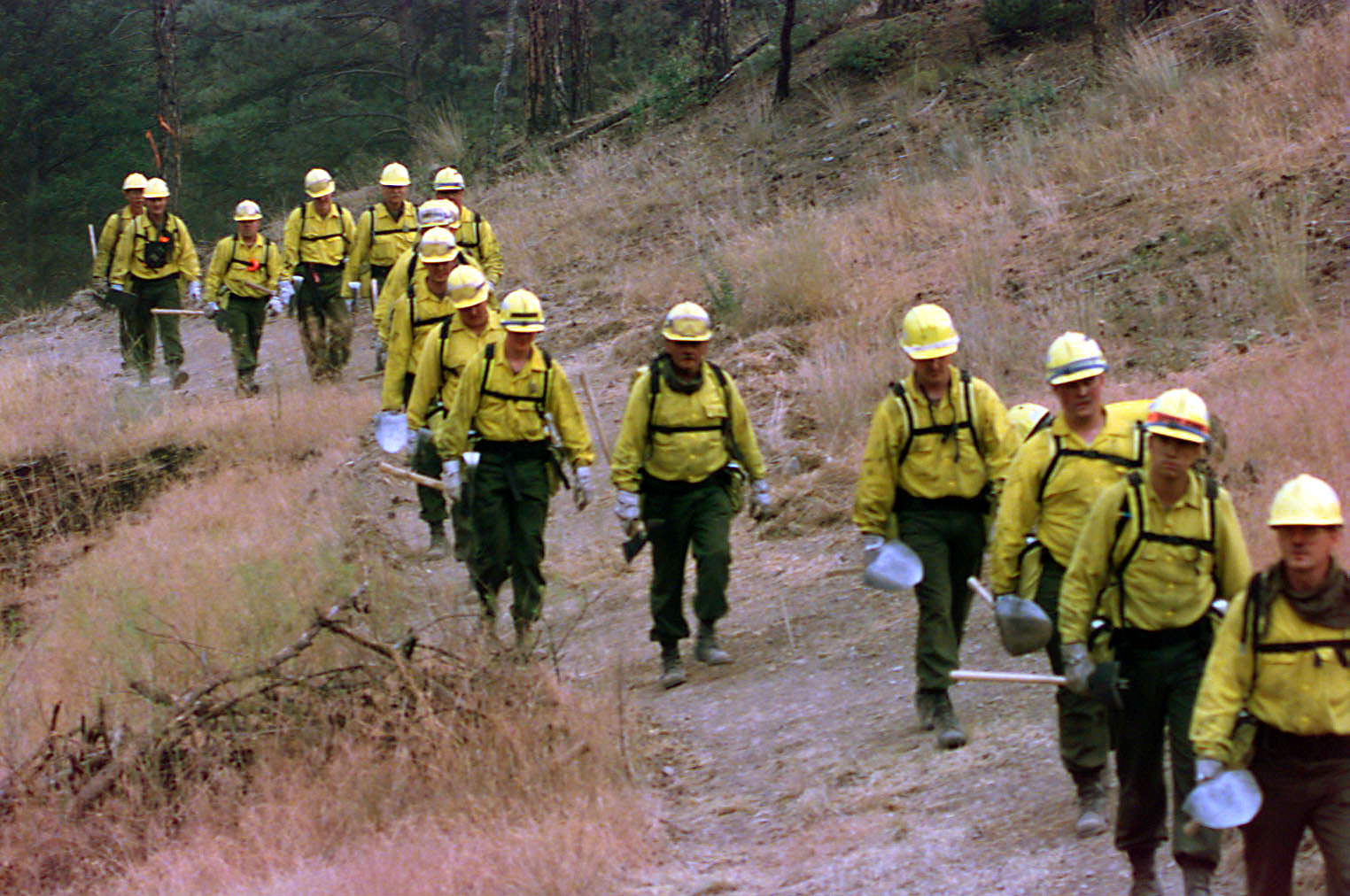
Montana Army National Guardsmen helping during a wildfire fighting effort

National Guard units can be mobilized at any time by presidential order to supplement regular armed forces, and upon declaration of a state of emergency by the governor of the state in which they serve. Unlike Army Reserve members, National Guard members cannot be mobilized individually (except through voluntary transfers and Temporary Duty Assignments TDY), but only as part of their respective units. However, there has been a significant number of individual activations to support military operations (2001-?); the legality of this policy is a major issue within the National Guard.

=== Active duty callups ===
For much of the final decades of the twentieth century, National Guard personnel typically served "One weekend a month, two weeks a year", with a portion working for the Guard in a full-time capacity. The current forces formation plans of the US Army call for the typical National Guard unit (or National Guardsman) to serve one year of active duty for every three years of service. More specifically, current Department of Defense policy is that no Guardsman will be involuntarily activated for a total of more than 24 months (cumulative) in one six-year enlistment period (this policy is due to change 1 August 2007, the new policy states that soldiers will be given 24 months between deployments of no more than 24 months, individual states have differing policies).

== See also ==
- Mayhew Foster
