= 183rd =

183rd is the ordinal form of the number 183. 183rd or One hundred and eighty-third may also refer to:

- A fraction, 1/183, equal to one of 183 equal parts
- 183rd Street (disambiguation)

== Military ==
- 183rd Brigade (disambiguation)
- 183rd Division (disambiguation)
- 183rd Regiment (disambiguation)

== See also ==
- July 2, 183rd day of the year in a standard year
