= 183rd Division =

183rd Division may refer to:

- 183rd Division (People's Republic of China)
- 183rd Infantry Division of Africa, France
- 183rd Infantry Division (German Empire)
- 183rd Infantry Division (Wehrmacht), Germany
- 183rd Volksgrenadier Division, Wehrmacht, Germany
- 183rd Infantry Division "Ciclone", Italy
- 183rd Rifle Division, Soviet Union

== See also ==
- List of military divisions by number
- 183rd Brigade (disambiguation)
- 183rd Regiment (disambiguation)
- 183rd (disambiguation)
