= 183rd Street =

183rd Street may refer to the following stations of the New York City Subway in the Bronx:

- 183rd Street (IRT Third Avenue Line); former elevated station of the IRT Third Avenue Line
- 183rd Street (IRT Jerome Avenue Line); serving the 4 train
- 182nd–183rd Streets (IND Concourse Line); serving the B and D trains
