= Mayhew Foster =

United States Army general

- Born: October 9, 1911; Richmond, Virginia, U.S.
- Died: March 21, 2011 (aged 99); Missoula, Montana, U.S.
- Military career
- Allegiance: United States
- Branch: United States Air Force
- Rank: Brigadier general
- Nickname: Bo
- Unit: Montana Air National Guard
- Awards: Silver Star; Légion d'Honneur

Mayhew Y. "Bo" Foster (October 9, 1911 – March 21, 2011) was an American soldier who flew captured Nazi war criminal Hermann Göring from Austria to Germany for interrogation by the 7th Army. For his actions in World War II, Foster was awarded both the Silver Star and the Légion d'Honneur.

Göring was convicted of war crimes, but in October 1946 before he could be hanged by the Nuremberg authorities, he committed suicide by taking a cyanide capsule someone had smuggled to him.

By October 1945, Foster was back in the United States, having flown seventy reconnaissance combat missions during his wartime service. He returned to his adopted home state of Montana, where he was appointed as lieutenant colonel in the Montana Army National Guard. He was thereafter promoted to brigadier general, a rank that he held from 1963 until 1971.

A native of Richmond, Virginia, Foster graduated in 1937 with a degree in English from Yale University in New Haven, Connecticut. He and his wife, Virginia Lou Foster (February 15, 1916 – May 7, 1993), were married in 1940. The couple had one daughter, Susan Carol Foster Korkalo (1944–2007).

Foster died at the age of ninety-nine in a nursing home in Missoula, Montana. His last city of residence was Livingston in Park County, Montana. Survivors included son-in-law Roy E. Korkalo of Livingston, grandson Chris Korkalo, and a sister, Priscilla F. Howell.
