= 245th Aviation Regiment =

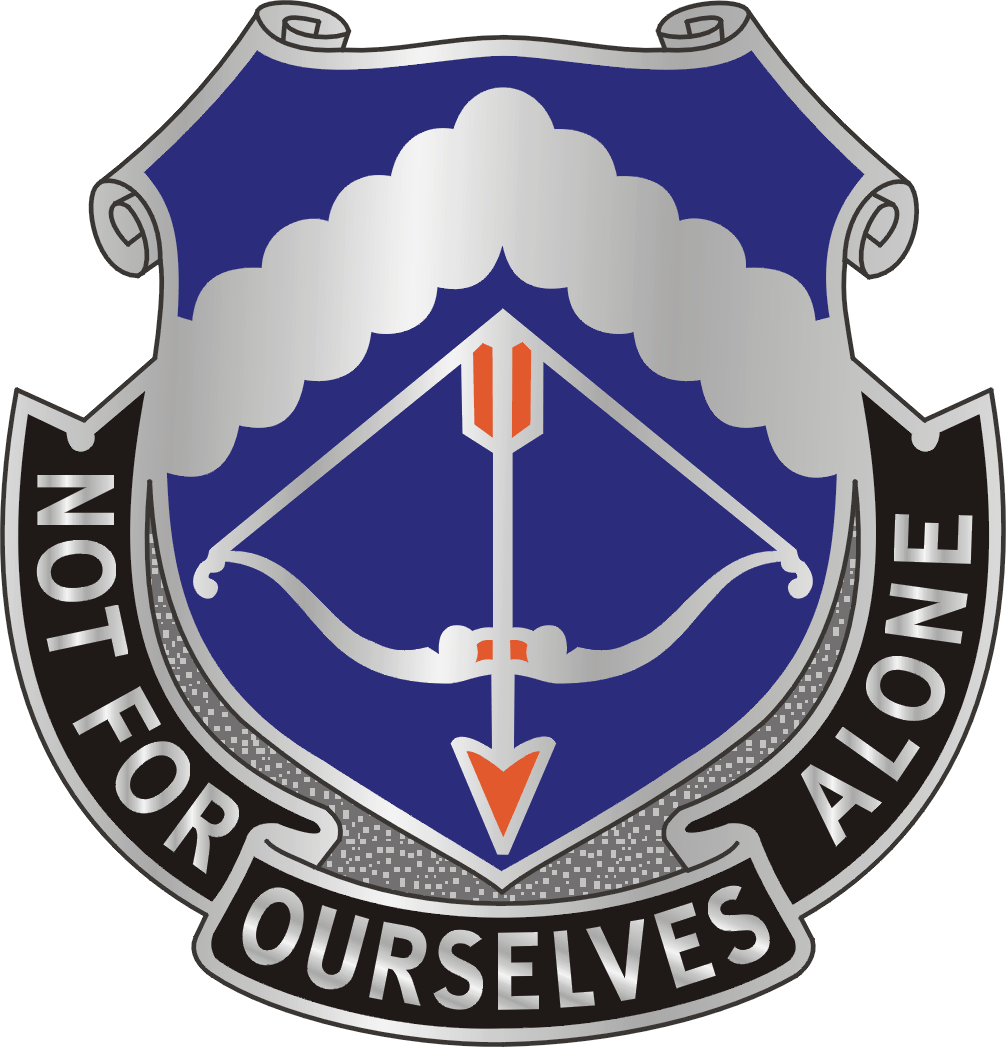
- Distinctive Unit Insignia
- Country: United States
- Branch: United States Army Aviation Branch
- Type: Aviation

Aircraft flown
- Transport: C-12U Huron

245th Aviation Regiment is an Aviation regiment of the United States Army.

== Organization ==
- 1st Battalion (Airfield Operations)
- 2nd Battalion (Fixed Wing)
  - Headquarters and Headquarters Company, at Will Rogers International Airport (Oklahoma Army National Guard)
  - Company A (former Det. 23 OSACOM; flying a C-12 Huron), at Quonset State Airport (Rhode Island Army National Guard)
    - Detachment 1 (former Det. 17 OSACOM; flying a C-26E Metroliner), at Raleigh–Durham International Airport (North Carolina Army National Guard)
    - Detachment 2 (former Det. 30 OSACOM; flying a C-26E Metroliner), at Robinson Army Airfield (Arkansas Army National Guard)
    - Detachment 3 (former Det. 32 OSACOM; flying a C-12 Huron), at Mather Army Airfield (California Army National Guard)
    - Detachment 4 (former Det. 7 OSACOM; flying a C-12 Huron), at Wilmington Airport (Delaware Army National Guard)
    - Detachment 5 (former Det. 36 OSACOM; flying a C-12 Huron), at Decatur Airport (Illinois Army National Guard)
    - Detachment 6 (former Det. 44 OSACOM; flying a C-12 Huron), at Santa Fe Regional Airport (New Mexico Army National Guard)
    - Detachment 7 (former Det. 51 OSACOM; flying a C-12 Huron), at Gray Army Airfield (Washington Army National Guard)
  - Company B (former Det. 9 OSACOM; flying a C-26E Metroliner), at Dobbins Air Reserve Base (Georgia Army National Guard)
    - Detachment 1 (former Det. 8 OSACOM; flying a C-12 Huron), at Northeast Florida Regional Airport (Florida Army National Guard)
    - Detachment 2 (former Det. 27 OSACOM; flying a C-12 Huron), at Burlington International Airport (Vermont Army National Guard)
    - Detachment 3 (former Det. 10 OSACOM; flying a C-12 Huron), at Indianapolis International Airport (Indiana Army National Guard)
    - Detachment 4 (former Det. 15 OSACOM; flying a C-12 Huron), at Capital Region International Airport (Michigan Army National Guard)
    - Detachment 5 (former Det. 39 OSACOM; flying a C-12 Huron), at St. Paul Downtown Airport (Minnesota Army National Guard)
    - Detachment 6 (former Det. 53 OSACOM; flying a C-12 Huron), at Cheyenne Regional Airport (Wyoming Army National Guard)
    - Detachment 7 (former Det. 41 OSACOM; flying a C-12 Huron), at Helena Regional Airport (Montana Army National Guard)
  - Company C (former Det. 46 OSACOM; flying a C-12 Huron), at Will Rogers International Airport (Oklahoma Army National Guard)
    - Detachment 1 (former Det. 26 OSACOM; flying a C-12 Huron), at Richmond International Airport (Virginia Army National Guard))
    - Detachment 2 (former Det. 40 OSACOM; flying a C-12 Huron), at Jefferson City Memorial Airport (Missouri Army National Guard)
    - Detachment 3 (former Det. 35 OSACOM; flying a C-12 Huron), at Boise Airport (Idaho Army National Guard)
    - Detachment 4 (former Det. 11 OSACOM; flying a C-12 Huron), at Capital City Airport (Kentucky Army National Guard)
    - Detachment 5 (former Det. 20 OSACOM; flying a C-12 Huron), at Albany International Airport (New York Army National Guard)
    - Detachment 6 (former Det. 33 OSACOM; flying a C-26E Metroliner), at Buckley Space Force Base (Colorado Army National Guard)
    - Detachment 7 (former Det. 42 OSACOM; flying a C-12 Huron), at Bismarck Municipal Airport (North Dakota Army National Guard)
