= 183rd Infantry Division of Africa =

- 183e division d'infanterie d'Afrique
- Active: September 1939
- Disbanded: July 1940
- Country: France
- Branch: French Army
- Type: Infantry Division of Africa
- Garrison/HQ: Constantine Department
- Engagements: World War II

The 183rd Infantry Division of Africa (183^{e} division d'infanterie d'Afrique) was a unit of the French Army formed in Algeria during the French colonial period at the beginning of World War II.

== History ==
The division was created in September 1939 in the Constantine Department. It was a division designated for protection and was not well-suited for offensive operations. The division remained in the Constantine Department and was disbanded in July 1940 without having seen combat.

== Composition ==
=== Infantry ===
- 23rd Zouaves Regiment, mobilized in late August 1939 in Constantine
- 15th Senegalese Tirailleurs Regiment, which was part of the Constantine Division before the war
- Some sources indicate a Marching battalion of Senegalese Tirailleurs
- Motorized company of the 1st Foreign Infantry Regiment of the Foreign Legion Infantry.
- Artillery: 387th of African Artillery, with a single group, also referred to as the 183rd autonomous artillery group

=== Cavalry ===
  - 183rd Reconnaissance Group of Infantry Division, formed on 1 March 1940 of the reduced overseas type, which was the former autonomous horse-drawn group of the 3rd Regiment of African Chasers
  - One cavalry squadron (unknown origin)
