= 183rd Division (People's Republic of China) =

183rd Division (1949–52)
- Active: 1949.2 - 1952.3
- Country: People's Republic of China
- Branch: People's Liberation Army
- Type: Division
- Role: Infantry
- Part of: 61st Corps
- Engagements: Chinese Civil War

The 183rd Division (Chinese: 第183师) was created in February 1949 under the Regulation of the Redesignations of All Organizations and Units of the Army, issued by Central Military Commission on November 1, 1948, basing on the 39th Brigade, 13th Column of Huabei Military Region. Its history could be traced to 2nd Independent Brigade of Taihang Military District formed in October 1947.

The division was composed of 547th, 548th and 549th Infantry Regiments. As a part of 61st Corps the division took part in the Chinese Civil War, including the Lifen Campaign, Taiyuan Campaign, Fumei Campaign and Chengdu Campaign.

From March 1950, the division was combined with Da County Military Sub-district.

In March 1951, 548th Infantry Regiment was transferred to 182nd Division.

In March 1952, the division was disbanded.
