= 183rd Aviation Regiment =

- Country: USA
- Branch: United States Army Aviation Branch
- Type: Aviation
- Garrison/HQ: Gowen Field

Insignia
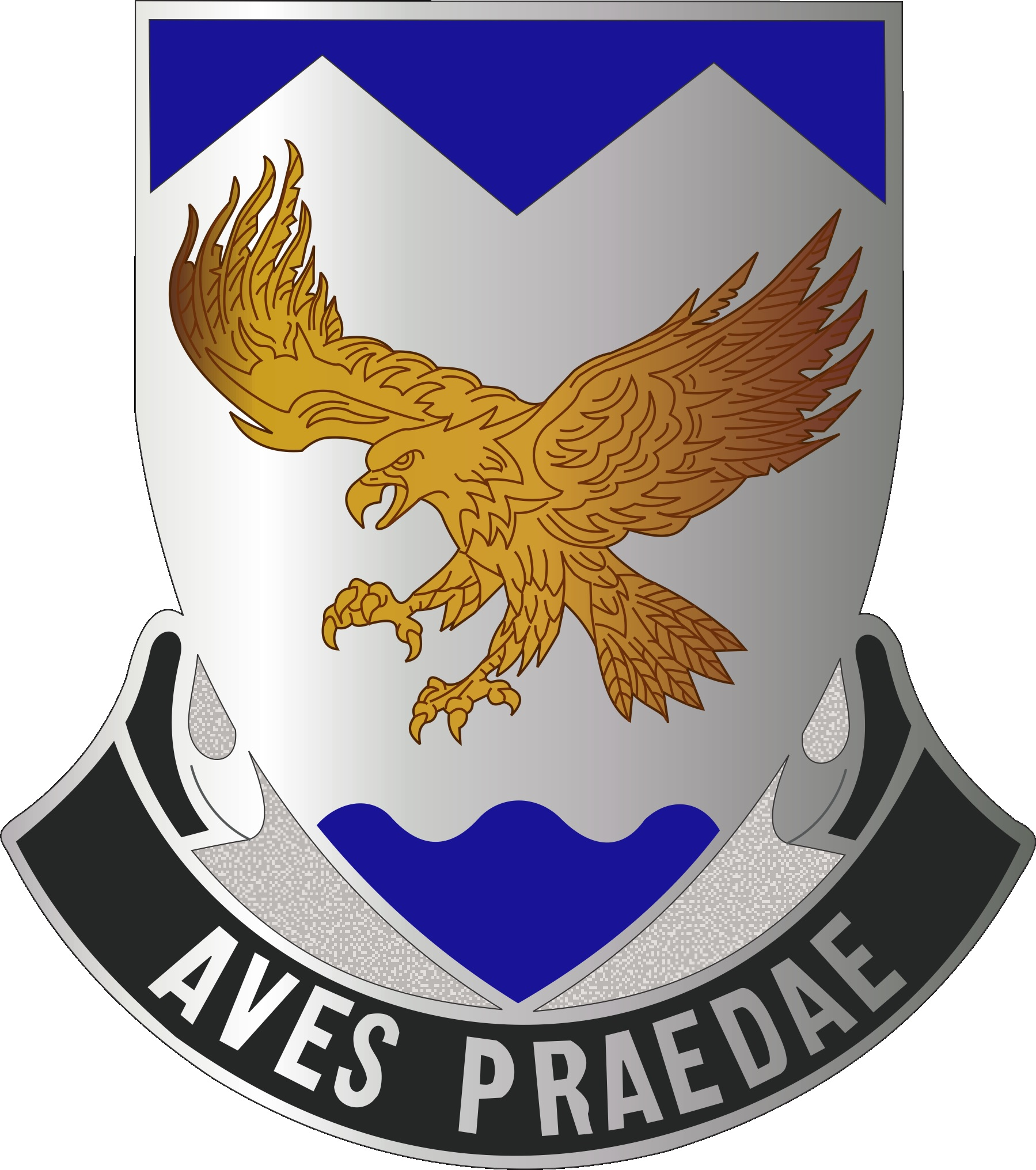
- Distinctive Unit Insignia

Aircraft flown
- Utility helicopter: UH-60M Black Hawk

The 183rd Aviation Regiment is an aviation regiment of the U.S. Army.

== Organization ==
- 1st Battalion (Assault), 183rd Aviation Regiment, at Gowen Field (ID) (part of 34th Combat Aviation Brigade)
  - Headquarters and Headquarters Company, 1st Battalion (Assault), 183rd Aviation Regiment, at Gowen Field (ID)
  - Company A, 1st Battalion (Assault), 183rd Aviation Regiment, at Gowen Field (ID) (UH-60M Black Hawk)
  - Company B, 1st Battalion (Assault), 183rd Aviation Regiment, at Gowen Field (ID) (UH-60M Black Hawk)
  - Company C, 1st Battalion (Assault), 183rd Aviation Regiment, at Hilo International Airport (HI) (UH-60M Black Hawk) (Hawaii Army National Guard)
  - Company D (Aviation Unit Maintenance), 1st Battalion (Assault), 183rd Aviation Regiment, at Gowen Field (ID)
  - Company E (Forward Support), 1st Battalion (Assault), 183rd Aviation Regiment, at Gowen Field (ID)
