= 182nd–183rd Streets station =

New York City Subway station in the Bronx

182–183 Streets
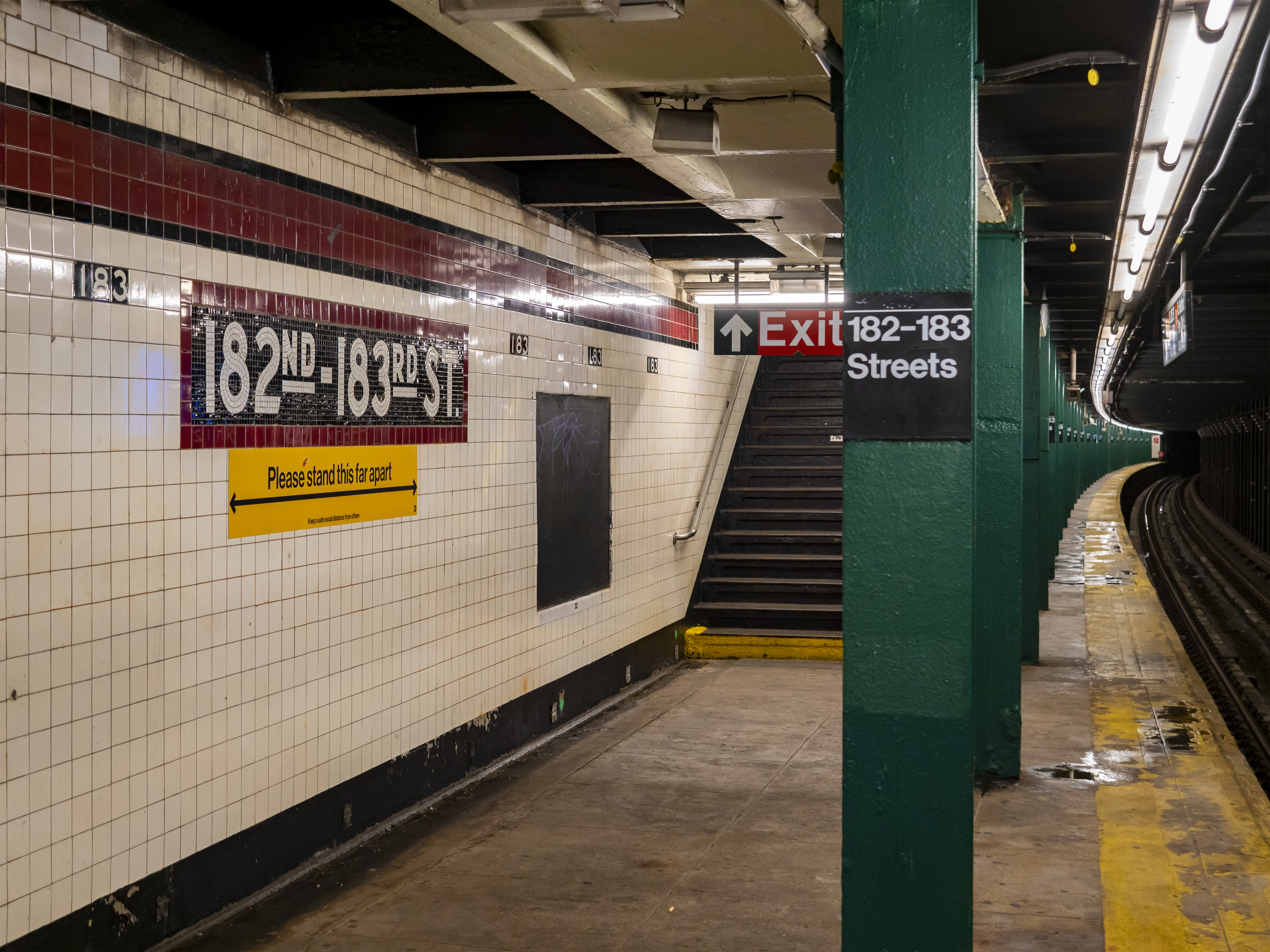
- View of northbound platform

Station statistics
- Address: East 182nd Street & Grand Concourse; Bronx, New York
- Borough: The Bronx
- Locale: Fordham Heights
- Coordinates: 40.856766°N 73.900309°W
- Division: B (IND)
- Line: IND Concourse Line
- Services: B (weekdays only); D (all except rush hours, peak direction)
- Transit: NYCT Bus: Bx1, Bx2
- Structure: Underground
- Platforms: 2 side platforms
- Tracks: 3

Other information
- Opened: July 1, 1933 (93 years ago)
- Accessible: No; planned

Traffic
- 2025: 967,479 ▲14.8%
- Rank: 316 out of 423
Services
Preceding station	New York City Subway	Following station
Fordham Road B D toward Norwood–205th Street	D (New York City Subway service)	Tremont Avenue B D toward Coney Island–Stillwell Avenue
Location
Location within New York City Subway
Location within New York City
Location within New York
Track layout
Street map
Station service legend
Symbol	Description
Stops all times except rush hours in the peak direction	Stops all times except rush hours in the peak direction
Stops rush hours only	Stops rush hours only
Stops weekdays during the day	Stops weekdays during the day

The 182nd–183rd Streets station is a local station on the IND Concourse Line of the New York City Subway. It is served by the D train at all times except rush hours in the peak direction and the B train on weekdays only.

== History ==
This station was built as part of the IND Concourse Line, which was one of the original lines of the city-owned Independent Subway System (IND). The route of the Concourse Line was approved to Bedford Park Boulevard on June 12, 1925 by the New York City Board of Transportation. Construction of the line began in July 1928. The station opened on July 1, 1933, along with the rest of the Concourse subway. As part of its 2025–2029 Capital Program, the MTA has proposed making the station wheelchair-accessible in compliance with the Americans with Disabilities Act of 1990.

== Station layout ==
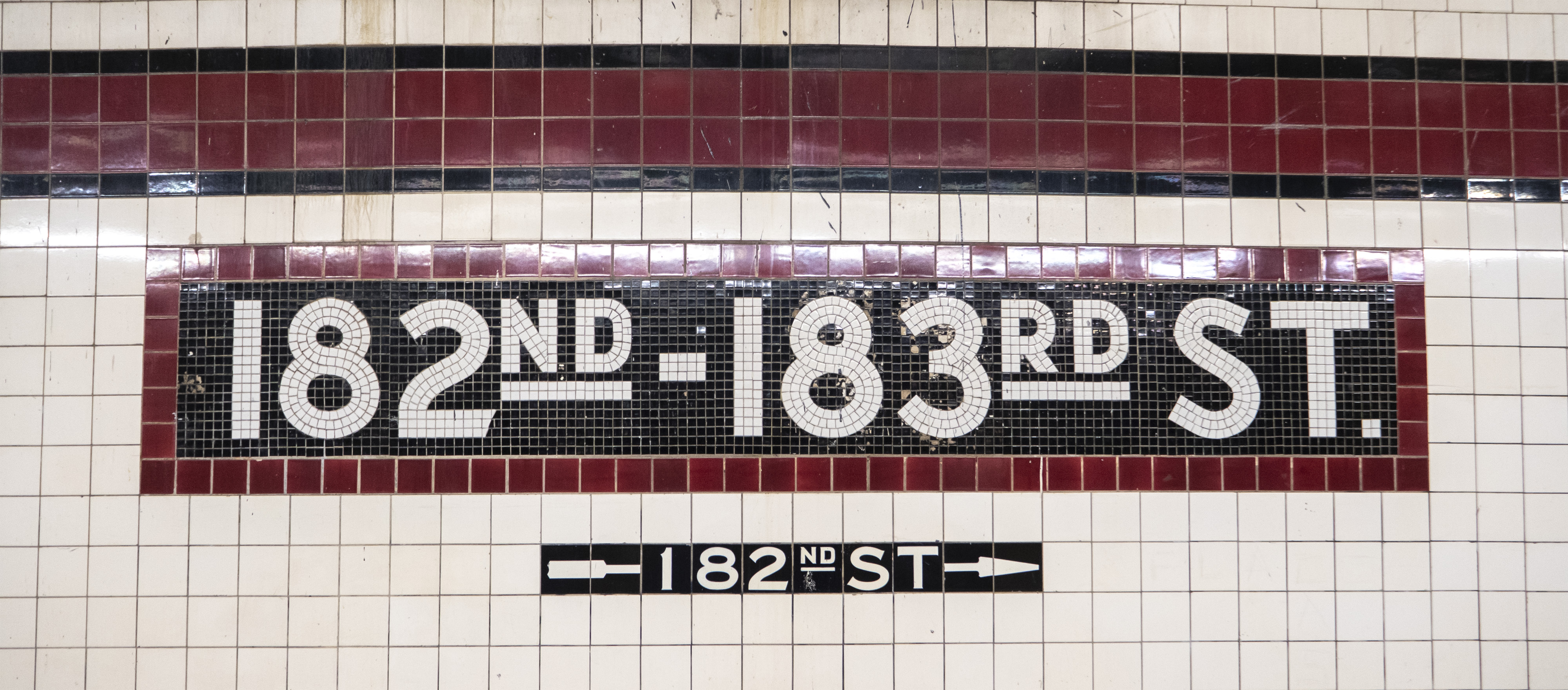
Mosaic name tablet

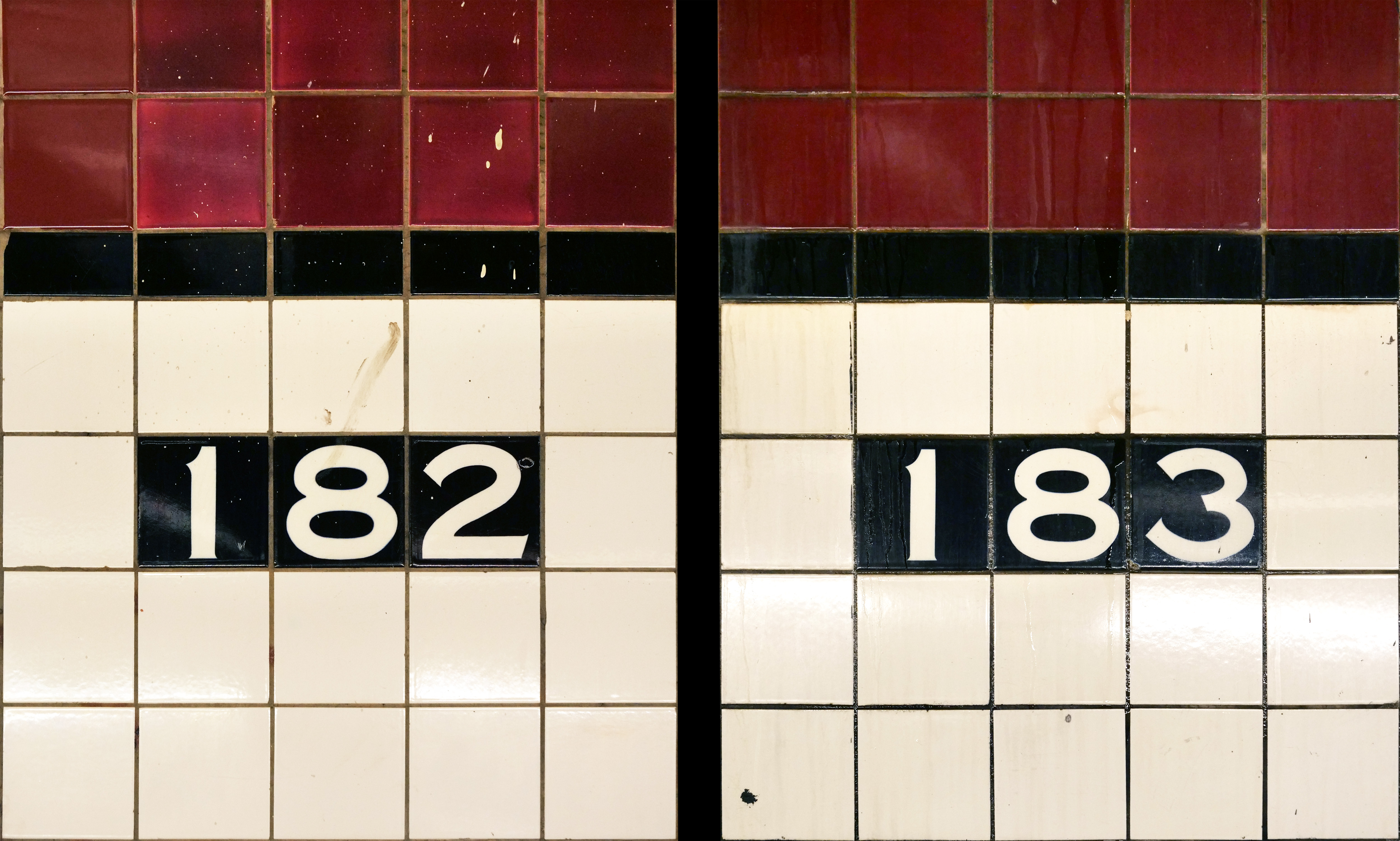
"182" and "183" tile captions

This underground station has three tracks and two side platforms. The center track is used by the D express train during rush hours in the peak direction.

Both platforms have a Claret red trim line with a black border and mosaic name tablets reading "182ND-183RD ST." in white sans-serif lettering on a black background with a Claret red border. Below the trim line are tile captions in white lettering on a black background showing "182" in the south half of the station and "183" in the north half, similar to the arrangement at the 174th–175th Streets station. There are also directional tile captions below the name tablet mosaics.

Hunter green i-beams run along the platforms at regular intervals with alternating ones having the standard black station name plate with white lettering.

=== Exits ===
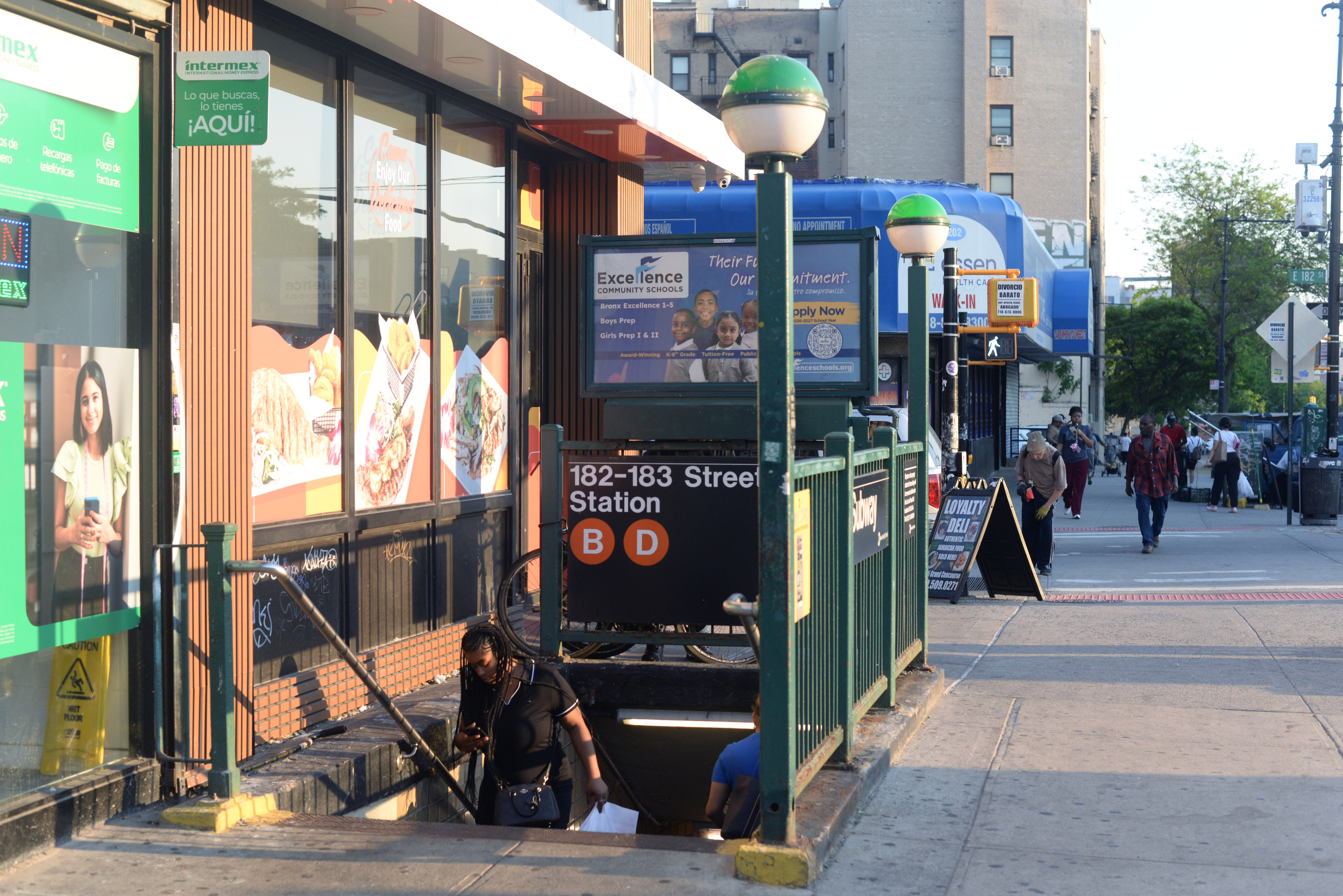
Station entrance.

The mezzanine used to be full length, but has been reduced in size. Crossovers between the two directions are allowed only from the northernmost set of stairs.

Despite the station's name, there is no longer an open exit to 183rd Street. The only open exits are at all four corners of 182nd Street and Grand Concourse. A gated-off passageway on the north end of the mezzanine leads to a former booth and exits to all four corners of 183rd Street. The stairs have been sealed on street level as early as 1996.

There were two additional exits at the south end that lead to both sides of the Grand Concourse and Anthony Avenue (between East 181st and 182nd Streets). At the request of the local community, these exits and the passageway leading to them were temporarily closed in January 1989 due to low usage, safety hazards and because vandals and criminals frequented the area. After the hearings took place in February and March the same year, these exits were completely shuttered after June 1989 and the stairs were also sealed on street level. However, the entrance structures remained on street level as early as June 1994.
