= 189th Aviation Regiment =

U.S. Army military unit

- Country: USA
- Allegiance: Montana
- Branch: United States Army Aviation Branch
- Type: Aviation
- Part of: 34th Infantry Division; 95th Troop Command (Montana Army National Guard)
- Garrison/HQ: Fort William Henry Harrison, Helena, Montana

Insignia
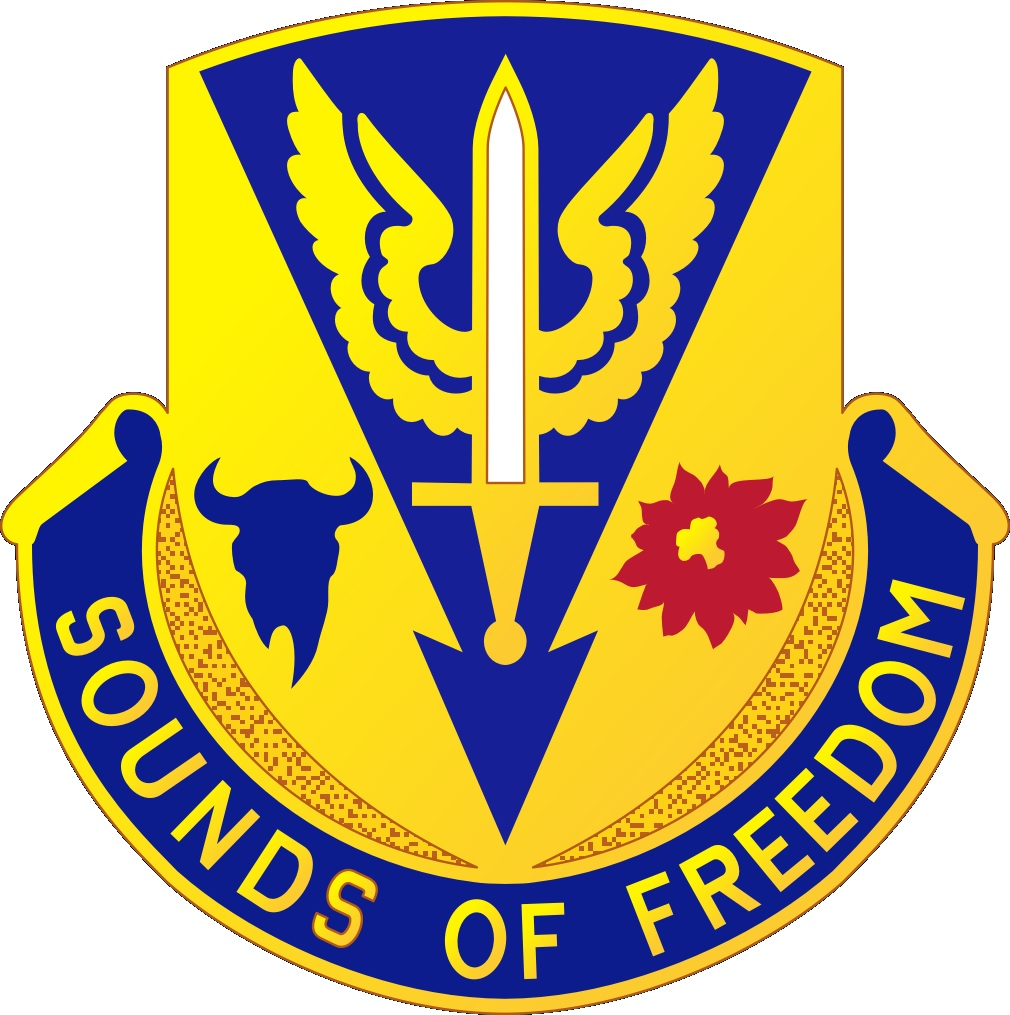
- Distinctive Unit Insignia

Aircraft flown
- Cargo helicopter: Boeing CH-47 Chinook
- Observation helicopter: Eurocopter UH-72 Lakota
- Utility helicopter: UH-60M Black Hawk

The 189th Aviation Regiment is an aviation regiment of the U.S. Army. It was probably formed in the late 1980s.

The 1st Battalion is part of the 34th Infantry Division, and administratively supervised while under state control by the 95th Troop Command of the Montana Army National Guard.

== Organization ==
- 1st Battalion (General Support Aviation), 189th Aviation Regiment, at Helena Army Airfield
  - Headquarters and Headquarters Company, 1st Battalion, 189th Aviation Regiment, at Helena Army Airfield
  - Company A (Command Aviation Company), 1st Battalion, 189th Aviation Regiment, in Billings
  - Company B (Heavy Lift), 1st Battalion, 189th Aviation Regiment, at Reno Stead Airport (NV) (CH-47F Chinook helicopters) (Nevada Army National Guard)
    - Detachment 1, Company B (Heavy Lift), 1st Battalion, 189th Aviation Regiment, at Helena Army Airfield
  - Company C (MEDEVAC), 1st Battalion, 189th Aviation Regiment, at Rapid City Regional Airport (SD) (HH-60M Black Hawk) (South Dakota Army National Guard)
    - Detachment 1, Company C (MEDEVAC), 1st Battalion, 189th Aviation Regiment, at Helena Army Airfield
  - Company D (Aviation Unit Maintenance), 1st Battalion, 189th Aviation Regiment, at Helena Army Airfield
  - Company E (Forward Support), 1st Battalion, 189th Aviation Regiment, at Helena Army Airfield
  - Company F (Air Traffic Service), 1st Battalion, 189th Aviation Regiment, at Camp Ripley (MN) (Minnesota Army National Guard)
  - Company G (MEDEVAC), 1st Battalion, 189th Aviation Regiment, at McNary Airfield (OR) (HH-60M Black Hawk) (Oregon Army National Guard)
