= 183rd Brigade =

183rd Brigade may refer to:

- 183rd Mixed Brigade, Spain
- 183rd (2nd Gloucester and Worcester) Brigade, United Kingdom

== See also ==
- 183rd Division (disambiguation)
- 183rd Regiment (disambiguation)
