= 834th Aviation Support Battalion =

- 834th ASB's Coat of Arms
- Active: 1 September 2000 – present
- Country: United States of America
- Branch: National Guard
- Type: Battalion
- Role: Aviation support
- Size: Approx 670 Soldiers
- Garrison/HQ: Arden Hills, MN
- Motto: "Second to None"
- Engagements: Iraq Campaign (OIF 08-10)
- Decorations: Meritorious Unit Commendation (MUC) – Iraq

Commanders
- Current CO & CSM: LTC David Wagner; CSM Ryan Wagner
- Past CO & CSM: LTC Daniel O'Meara (2018–2021); CSM Marc Dempsey (2018-2021); LTC Jeffrey Merricks (2015–2018); LTC Gary Jorgenson (2012–2015); CSM Juan Esquivel (2015–2018); LTC Michael Taff (2009–2012); CSM Craig Heggerston (2009–2015); LTC Eric Waage (2006–2009); CSM Jeffrey Lindberg (2006–2009); LTC John Dewey (2004–2006); CSM Todd Newton (2004–2006); LTC Deborah Sieben (2002–2004); CSM Gary Thesing (2003–2005); LTC Mark Lewis (2000–2002); CSM Richard Rakow (2000–2003)

Insignia
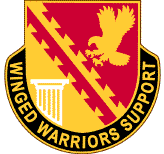
- 834th ASB Distinctive Unit Insignia worn by 834th ASB Soldiers

- 34th Infantry Division shoulder sleeve insignia (SSI) worn by 834th ASB Soldiers

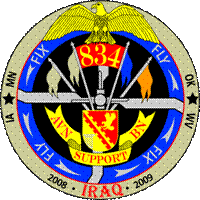
- 834th ASB Iraq campaign deployment patch

The 834th Aviation Support Battalion (834th ASB) is a US Army National Guard battalion headquartered in Arden Hills, Minnesota. It has units and elements in Minnesota, Mississippi, and Oklahoma. The battalion has over 670 soldiers and is designed to support a Combat Aviation Brigade (CAB). The 834th ASB is an organic part of the 34th Combat Aviation Brigade (Expeditionary), 34th "Red Bull" Infantry Division.

== Organization ==
Four companies form the 834th Aviation Support Battalion.

- Headquarters and Support Company (HSC) located in Arden Hills, Minnesota.
- Distribution Company (A Company) located in Arden Hills, Minnesota.
- Aviation Maintenance Company (B Company) located in Tulsa, Oklahoma with detachments in Arden Hills, Minnesota, and Tupelo, Mississippi.
- Signal Network Support Company (C Company) located in Arden Hills, Minnesota.

== Principal functions ==
The ASB is the primary aviation logistics organization in the combat aviation brigade (CAB). The ASB provides aviation and ground field maintenance, resupply, communications and medical support. The ASB has been designed to support the aviation brigade's forward support companies, aviation maintenance companies/troops and the brigade's headquarters company. In addition to the standard battalion staff, the ASB has an organic combat service support automation management office (CSSAMO) and a well-staffed support operations (SPO) section. The CSSAMO capability provides support to the entire brigade's automation. The SPO section is organized to coordinate logistical support and provide distribution management for the brigade.

== History ==
The 834th Aviation Support Battalion (ASB) was organized on 1 September 2000 from new and existing units within the National Guard. The battalion performed extensive MN state active duty operations during the 2001 Red River Flood. It also provided the logistics support for the 1st Brigade Combat Team (1 BCT) of the 34th ID's Mobilization Readiness Exercise at Fort Polk, Louisiana in 2005.

== Iraq campaign ==
On 3 June 2008, the 834th ASB was federalized for service as part of Operation Iraqi Freedom and was sent to Fort Sill, Oklahoma for training and mobilization. For the deployment, the Mississippi Detachment of B Company, 834th ASB was not activated. The battalion was also augmented with personnel from B Company, 248th ASB of the Iowa National Guard. The 834th ASB was part of Task Force 34 which was commanded by the Combat Aviation Brigade, 34th Infantry Division (Expeditionary). By August 2008, the battalion arrived at Camp Buehring, Kuwait to train and manage the port operations for the rest of the Task Force.

After moving north into Iraq, the 834th ASB replaced the 412th Aviation Support Battalion on 7 September 2008 in Balad, Iraq (LSA Anaconda/Joint Base Balad). Task Force 34 was the Corps Combat Aviation Brigade as part of Multi-National Corps - Iraq (MNC-I). The 834th ASB provided support not only to TF 34, but also became the supporting ASB for TF 49 (later replaced by TF 449) that was the combat aviation brigade for Multi-National Division Center (MND-C). This arrangement required the battalion to have a support element based at the Baghdad International Airport (BIAP). Later, with mission restructuring in the southern part of Iraq, the battalion sent additional assets, including C Company, 834th ASB to Tallil, Iraq (FOB Adder) to develop an aviation support infrastructure there. Eventually, the BIAP-based elements moved south to Tallil to support Multi-National Division-South. The 834th ASB completed its combat tour in Iraq in May 2009 and was awarded the Meritorious Unit Commendation on 8 May 2009.

== Insignia ==
The official unit insignia was approved by the Military Institute of Heraldry on 6 March 2000. The crest consists of a shield blazoned: Per bend Gules and Buff, a bend dovetailed per bend counterchanged between an eagle swooping Or and a demi-column issuant from the base Argent. Attached below the shield a Black scroll inscribed "WINGED WARRIORS SUPPORT" in Gold. Buff and scarlet are the colors traditionally associated with Support organizations Gold Denotes high achievement and honor. Black suggests strength and consistency. The dovetail or interlocking joint, counterchanged in color, represents unity, teamwork and support. The eagle underscores the motto and represents the unit's aviation support mission. The column represents a reliable base of support.

== Deployment patch ==
The traditional, but informal, deployment patch was adopted by the battalion while undergoing training at Fort Sill, Oklahoma. The outer ring lists the states with units serving as part of the battalion (Iowa was added to the deployment, while Mississippi was deleted). Resting atop the 834th banner, is an eagle with spread wings, which is the traditional Quartermaster Eagle. This represents the overarching support and sustainment role of the 834th. Centering the patch is a top view of a UH-60 helicopter rotor head. A blue circle marked "FLY-FIX-FLY-FIX" denotes the continuous flow of combat aviation missions and maintenance. The battalion crest rests near the bottom of the patch from where the four company guidons emerge revealing their branch colors (HSC-Quartermaster (QM); A Co-Quartermaster (QM); B Co-Aviation (AV); C Co-Signal (SC)).
