= 112th Aviation Regiment =

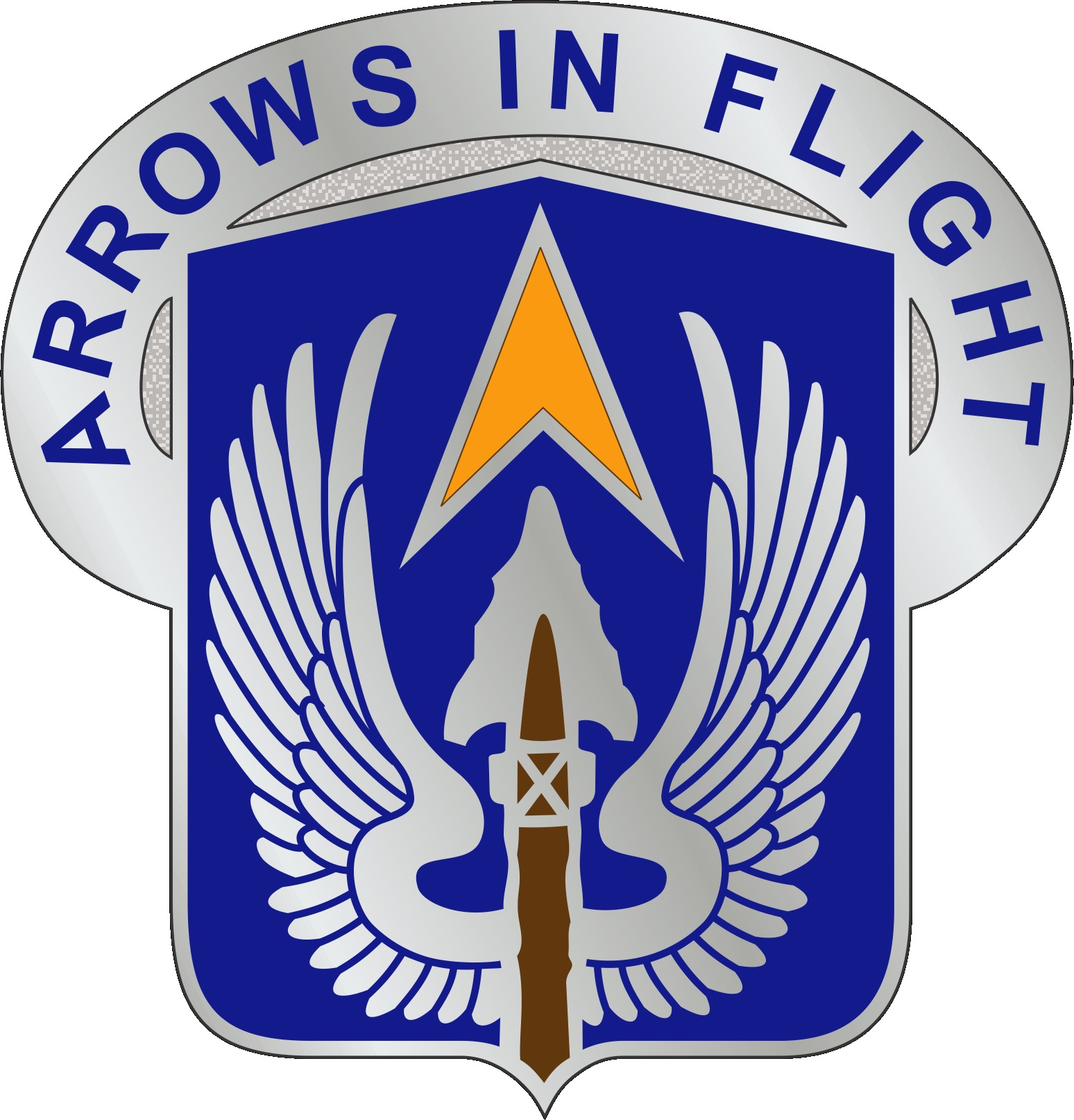
- coat of arms
- Country: USA
- Branch: United States Army Aviation Branch
- Type: Aviation

Aircraft flown
- Utility helicopter: UH-72A Lakota

The 112th Aviation Regiment is an aviation regiment of the U.S. Army.

== Structure ==
- 1st Battalion (Security & Support)
  - Headquarters and Headquarters Company
  - Company A at Army Aviation Support Facility #1, Bismarck Municipal Airport (ND ARNG).
  - Company B at Grand Ledge (MI ARNG).
    - Detachment 2 at Army Aviation Support Facility, South Valley Regional Airport, (UT ARNG).
  - Company D (UH-72A) at Army Aviation Support Facility #2, Fargo Air National Guard Base, (ND ARNG).
    - Detachment 1 (Idaho Army National Guard).
    - Detachment 2 (Wisconsin Army National Guard).
  - Company H at Army Aviation Support Facility #1, Bismarck Municipal Airport (ND ARNG).

The regiment also includes Detachment 1, Company C, from the OR ARNG
