= Helena Regional Airport =

Airport in Montana, United States

Helena Regional Airport Helena Army Airfield

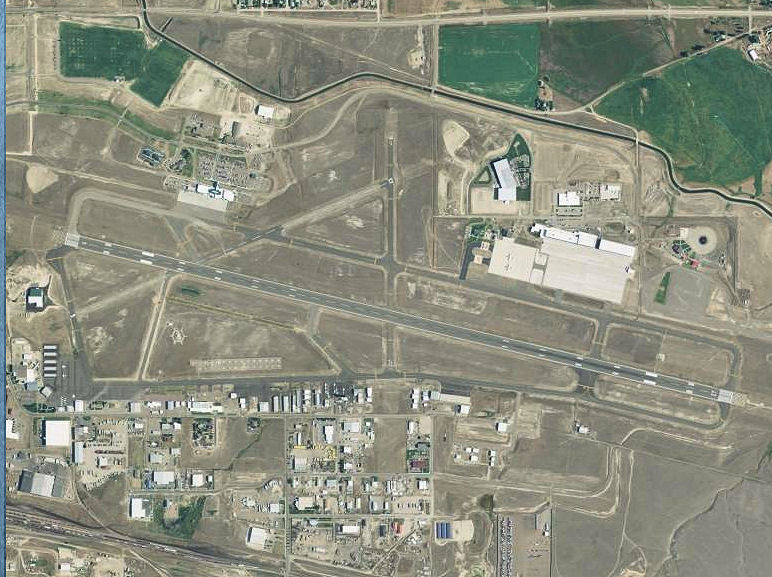
- USGS 2006 orthophoto
- IATA: HLN; ICAO: KHLN; FAA LID: HLN

Summary
- Airport type: Public
- Owner: Helena Regional Airport Authority
- Serves: Helena, Montana
- Elevation AMSL: 3,877 ft (1,182 m)
- Coordinates: 46°36′24″N 111°58′58″W
- Website: HelenaAirport.com

Maps
- FAA airport diagram
- Interactive map of Helena Regional Airport

Runways
Direction	Length		Surface
Direction	ft	m	Surface
9/27	9,000	2,743	Asphalt
5/23	4,644	1,415	Asphalt
16/34	2,989	911	Asphalt

Statistics (2020)
- Aircraft operations: 33,402
- Based aircraft: 237
- Source: Federal Aviation Administration

Helena Regional Airport (IATA: HLN, ICAO: KHLN, FAA LID: HLN) is a public airport two miles northeast of Helena, in Lewis and Clark County, Montana, United States. It is owned by the Helena Regional Airport Authority.

The National Plan of Integrated Airport Systems for 2011–2015 categorized it as a primary commercial service airport (more than 10,000 enplanements per year). Federal Aviation Administration records say the airport had 82,673 passenger boardings (enplanements) in calendar year 2022.

== Facilities ==
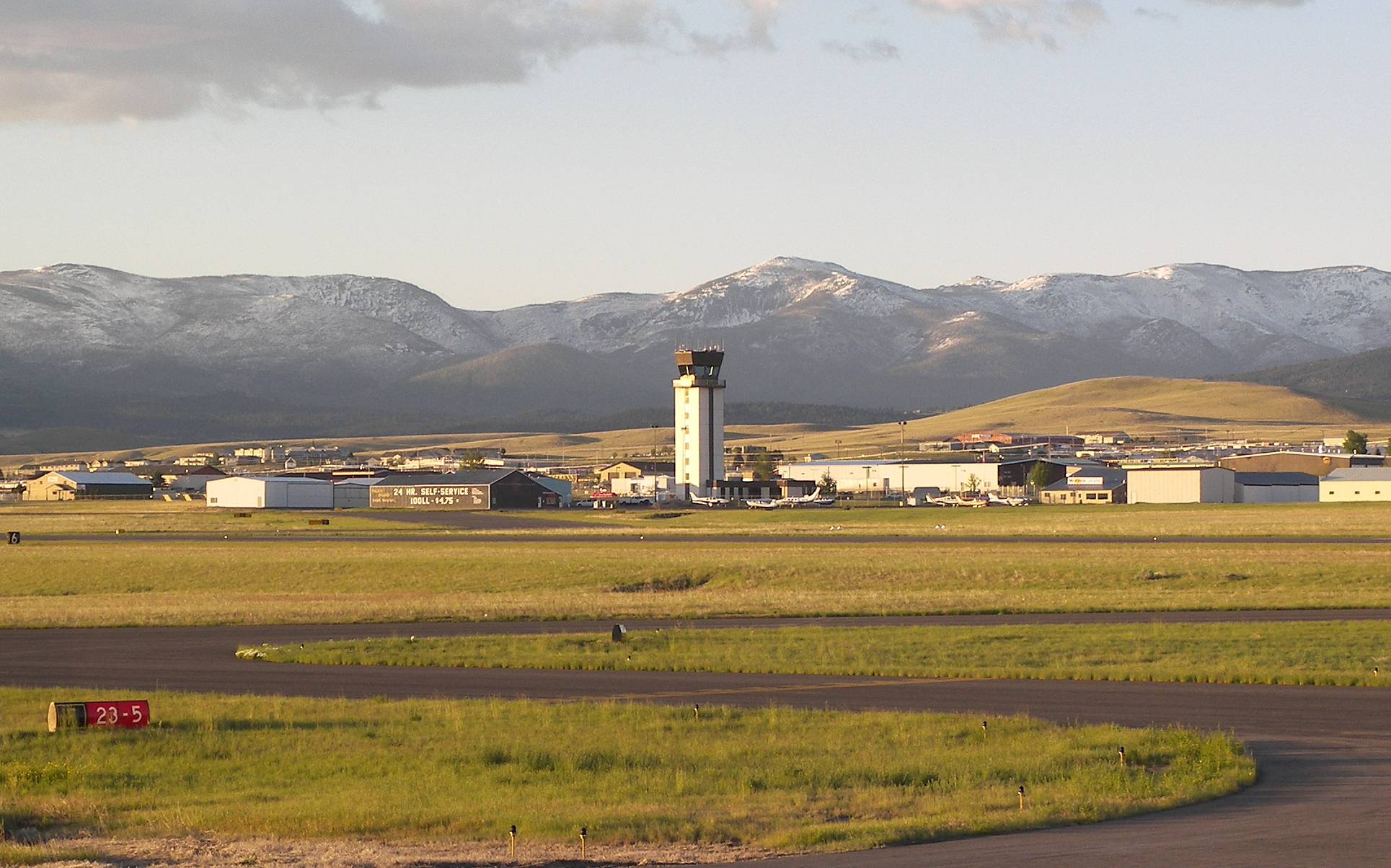
Helena Control Tower, 2008

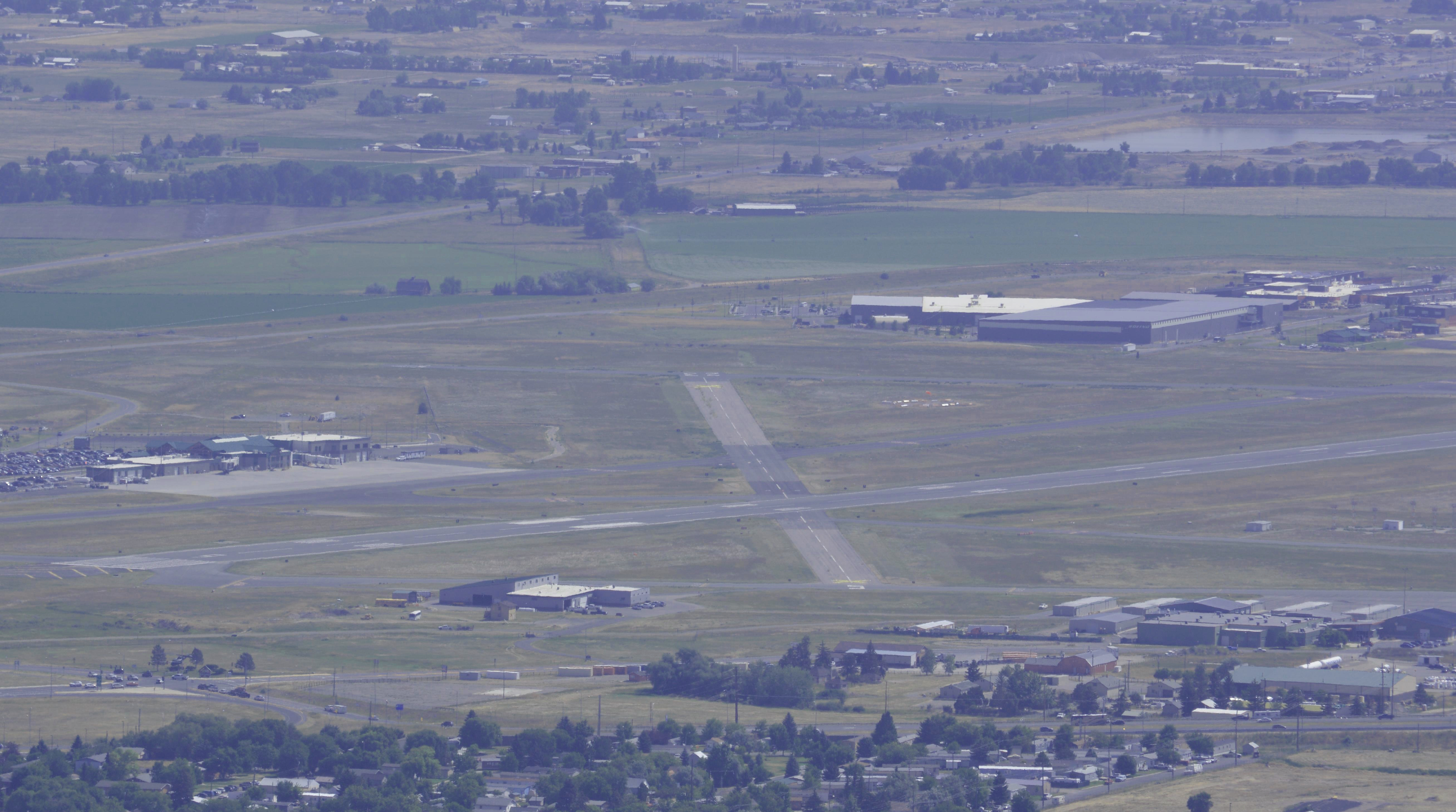
The airport viewed from Mt. Helena, 2018

Helena Regional Airport covers 1,224 acres (495 ha) at an elevation of 3,877 feet (1,182 m). It has three asphalt runways: 9/27 is 9,000 by 150 feet (2,743 x 46 m); 5/23 is 4,644 by 75 feet (1,415 x 23 m); 16/34 is 2,989 by 75 feet (911 x 23 m).

In 2013 the airport had 38,877 aircraft operations, average 106 per day: 68% general aviation, 14% military, 14% air taxi, and 4% airline. 137 aircraft were then based at the airport: 74% single-engine, 14% multi-engine, 2% jet, 3% helicopter, 2% ultralight, and 5% military.

== Airlines and destinations ==
Airlines	Destinations
Alaska Airlines	Seattle/Tacoma
Delta Connection	Salt Lake City
United Express	Denver

=== Cargo ===
Airlines	Destinations
Alpine Air Express	Billings, Kalispell, Butte

Destinations map
Destinations from Helena Regional Airport

== Statistics ==
=== Top destinations ===
Top ten busiest domestic routes from HLN (January 2025 – December 2025)
Rank	City	Passengers	Carriers
1	Salt Lake City, Utah	41,640	Delta
2	Denver, Colorado	38,580	United
3	Seattle/Tacoma, Washington	21,330	Alaska

Annual passenger traffic at HLN 2004–present
Year	Passengers	YoY change	Year	Passengers	YoY change	Year	Passengers	YoY change
2004	166,777	▲10.75%	2014	194,159	▲0.20%	2024	201,759	▲13.0%
2005	183,727	▲10.16%	2015	199,384	▲2.7%	2025	203,247	▲1.8%
2006	173,825	▼5.39%	2016	207,704	▲4.2%			
2007	165,798	▼4.62%	2017	209,488	▲0.9%			
2008	169,722	▲2.37%	2018	233,651	▲11.5%			
2009	177,344	▲4.49%	2019	237,382	▲1.6%			
2010	193,358	▲9.03%	2020	92,562	▼62.4%			
2011	202,204	▲4.48%	2021	142,286	▲53.4%			
2012	191,808	▼5.10%	2022	164,426	▲15.6%			
2013	193,704	▲1.00%	2023	178,585	▲8.6%			

== See also ==
- Montana World War II Army Airfields
- List of airports in Montana
